= 1947 in the United States =

- Decades: 1920s; 1930s; 1940s; 1950s; 1960s
- See also: History of the United States (1945–1964); Timeline of United States history (1930–1949); List of years in the United States

Events from the year 1947 in the United States.

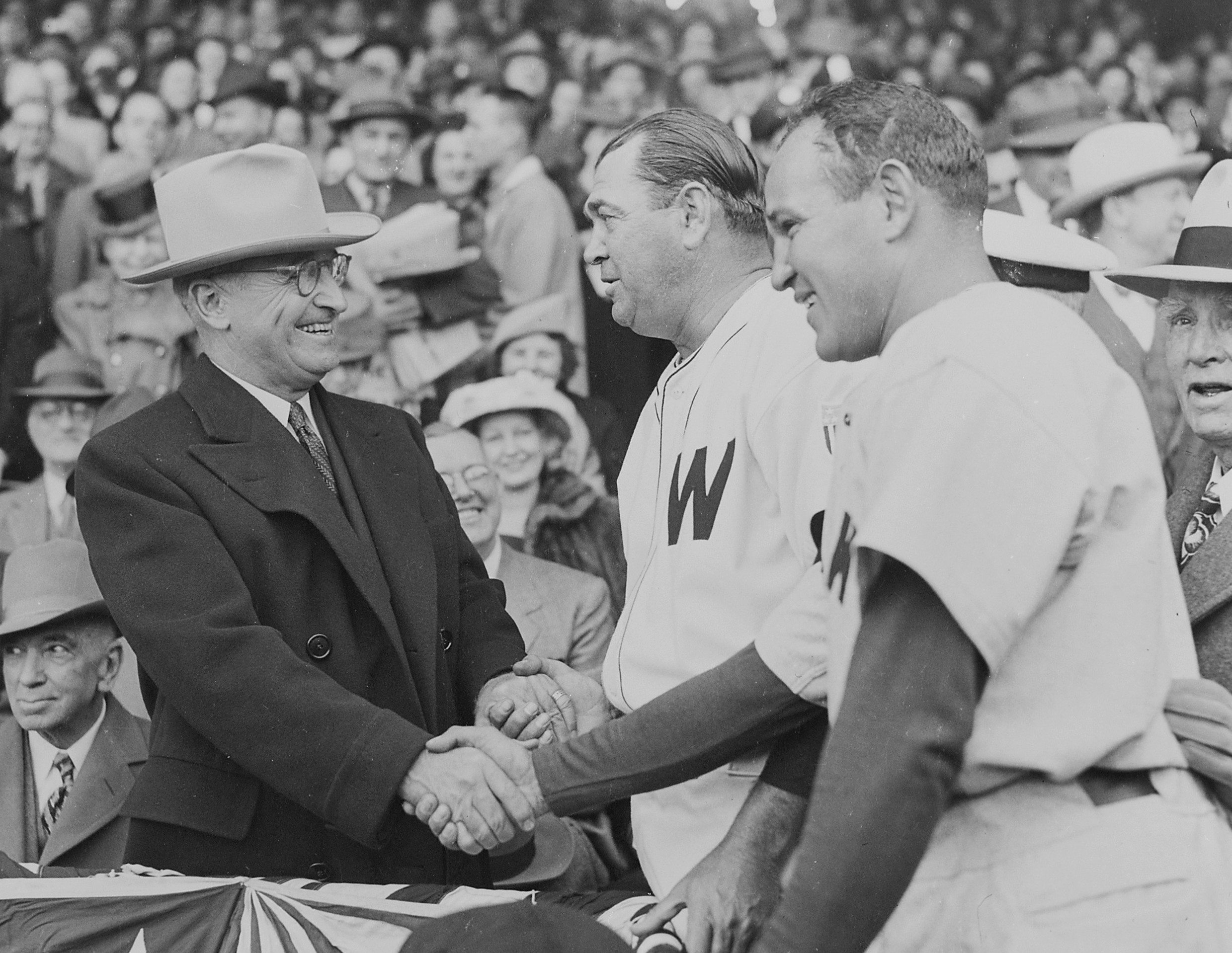
President Truman on the opening day of baseball season in 1947

== Incumbents ==
=== Federal government ===
- President: Harry S. Truman (D-Missouri)
- Vice President: vacant
- Chief Justice: Fred M. Vinson (Kentucky)
- Speaker of the House of Representatives:

Sam Rayburn (D-Texas) (until January 3)
Joseph William Martin Jr. (R-Massachusetts) (starting January 3)

- Senate Majority Leader:

Alben W. Barkley (D-Kentucky) (until January 3)
Wallace H. White Jr. (R-Maine) (starting January 3)

- Congress: 79th (until January 3), 80th (starting January 3)

==== State governments ====
Governors and lieutenant governors

=== Governors ===
- Governor of Alabama: Chauncey Sparks (Democratic) (until January 20), Jim Folsom (Democratic) (starting January 20)
- Governor of Arizona: Sidney Preston Osborn (Democratic)
- Governor of Arkansas: Benjamin Travis Laney (Democratic)
- Governor of California: Earl Warren (Republican)
- Governor of Colorado: John Charles Vivian (Republican) (until January 14), William Lee Knous (Democratic) (starting January 14)
- Governor of Connecticut: Charles W. Snow (Democratic) (until January 8), James L. McConaughy (Republican) (starting January 8)
- Governor of Delaware: Walter W. Bacon (Republican)
- Governor of Florida: Millard F. Caldwell (Democratic)
- Governor of Georgia:
  - until January 14: Ellis Arnall (Democratic)
  - January 14-March 18: Herman Talmadge (Democratic)
  - starting March 18: Melvin E. Thompson (Democratic)
- Governor of Idaho: Arnold Williams (Democratic) (until January 6), C. A. Robins (Republican) (starting January 6)
- Governor of Illinois: Dwight H. Green (Republican)
- Governor of Indiana: Ralph F. Gates (Republican)
- Governor of Iowa: Robert D. Blue (Republican)
- Governor of Kansas: Andrew F. Schoeppel (Republican) (until January 13), Frank Carlson (Republican) (starting January 13)
- Governor of Kentucky: Simeon S. Willis (Republican) (until December 9), Earle C. Clements (Democratic) (starting December 9)
- Governor of Louisiana: Jimmie H. Davis (Democratic)
- Governor of Maine: Horace A. Hildreth (Republican)
- Governor of Maryland: Herbert R. O'Conor (Democratic) (until January 3), William Preston Lane Jr. (Democratic) (starting January 3)
- Governor of Massachusetts: Maurice J. Tobin (Democratic) (until January 2), Robert F. Bradford (Republican) (starting January 2)
- Governor of Michigan: Harry Kelly (Republican) (until January 1), Kim Sigler (Republican) (starting January 1)
- Governor of Minnesota: Edward John Thye (Republican) (until January 8), Luther W. Youngdahl (Republican) (starting January 8)
- Governor of Mississippi: Fielding L. Wright (Democratic)
- Governor of Missouri: Phil M. Donnelly (Democratic)
- Governor of Montana: Sam C. Ford (Republican)
- Governor of Nebraska: Dwight Griswold (Republican) (until January 9), Val Peterson (Republican) (starting January 9)
- Governor of Nevada: Vail M. Pittman (Democratic)
- Governor of New Hampshire: Charles M. Dale (Republican)
- Governor of New Jersey: Walter Evans Edge (Republican) (until January 21), Alfred E. Driscoll (Republican) (starting January 21)
- Governor of New Mexico: John J. Dempsey (Democratic) (until January 1), Thomas J. Mabry (Democratic) (starting January 1)
- Governor of New York: Thomas Dewey (Republican)
- Governor of North Carolina: R. Gregg Cherry (Democratic)
- Governor of North Dakota: Fred G. Aandahl (Republican)
- Governor of Ohio: Frank J. Lausche (Democratic) (until January 13), Thomas J. Herbert (Republican) (starting January 13)
- Governor of Oklahoma: Robert S. Kerr (Democratic) (until January 13), Roy J. Turner (Democratic) (starting January 13)
- Governor of Oregon: Earl Snell (Republican) (until October 30), John H. Hall (Republican) (starting October 30)
- Governor of Pennsylvania:
  - until January 2: Edward Martin (Republican)
  - January 2-21: John C. Bell Jr. (Republican)
  - starting January 21: James H. Duff (Republican)
- Governor of Rhode Island: John Orlando Pastore (Democratic)
- Governor of South Carolina: Ransome Judson Williams (Democratic) (until January 21), Strom Thurmond (Democratic) (starting January 21)
- Governor of South Dakota: Merrill Q. Sharpe (Republican) (until January 7), George T. Mickelson (Republican) (starting January 7)
- Governor of Tennessee: Jim Nance McCord (Democratic)
- Governor of Texas: Coke R. Stevenson (Democratic) (until January 21), Beauford H. Jester (Democratic) (starting January 21)
- Governor of Utah: Herbert B. Maw (Democratic)
- Governor of Vermont: Mortimer R. Proctor (Republican) (until January 9), Ernest W. Gibson Jr. (Republican) (starting January 9)
- Governor of Virginia: William M. Tuck (Democratic)
- Governor of Washington: Monrad C. Wallgren (Democratic)
- Governor of West Virginia: Clarence W. Meadows (Democratic)
- Governor of Wisconsin: Walter S. Goodland (Republican) (until March 12), Oscar Rennebohm (Republican) (starting March 12)
- Governor of Wyoming: Lester C. Hunt (Democratic)

=== Lieutenant governors ===
- Lieutenant Governor of Alabama: Leven H. Ellis (Democratic) (until January 20), James C. Inzer (Democratic) (starting January 20)
- Lieutenant Governor of Arkansas: James Lavesque Shaver (political party unknown) (until month and day unknown), Nathan Green Gordon (Democratic) (starting month and day unknown)
- Lieutenant Governor of California: Frederick F. Houser (Republican) (until January 7), Goodwin Knight (Republican) (starting January 7)
- Lieutenant Governor of Colorado: William Eugene Higby (Republican) (until January 14), Homer Pearson (Republican) (starting January 14)
- Lieutenant Governor of Connecticut: vacant (until January 8), James C. Shannon (Republican) (starting January 8)
- Lieutenant Governor of Delaware: Elbert N. Carvel (Democratic)
- Lieutenant Governor of Georgia: Melvin E. Thompson (Democratic) (starting January 14 and ending March 18), vacant (starting March 18)
- Lieutenant Governor of Idaho: A. R. McCabe (Democratic) (until January 6), Donald S. Whitehead (Democratic) (starting January 6)
- Lieutenant Governor of Illinois: Hugh W. Cross (Republican)
- Lieutenant Governor of Indiana: Richard T. James (Republican)
- Lieutenant Governor of Iowa: Kenneth A. Evans (Republican)
- Lieutenant Governor of Kansas: Jess C. Denious (Republican) (until January 13), Frank L. Hagaman (Republican) (starting January 13)
- Lieutenant Governor of Kentucky: Kenneth H. Tuggle (Republican) (until December 9), Lawrence Wetherby (Democratic) (starting December 9)
- Lieutenant Governor of Louisiana: J. Emile Verret (Democratic)
- Lieutenant Governor of Massachusetts: vacant (starting January 2), Arthur W. Coolidge (Republican) (starting January 2)
- Lieutenant Governor of Michigan: Vernon J. Brown (Republican) (until January 1), Eugene C. Keyes (Republican) (starting January 1)
- Lieutenant Governor of Minnesota: C. Elmer Anderson (Republican)
- Lieutenant Governor of Mississippi: vacant
- Lieutenant Governor of Missouri: Walter Naylor Davis (Democratic)
- Lieutenant Governor of Montana: Ernest T. Eaton (Republican)
- Lieutenant Governor of Nebraska: Roy W. Johnson (Republican) (until January 9), Robert B. Crosby (Republican) (starting January 9)
- Lieutenant Governor of Nevada: vacant (until January), Clifford A. Jones (Democratic) (starting January)
- Lieutenant Governor of New Mexico: James B. Jones (Democratic) (until January 1), Joseph Montoya (Democratic) (starting January 1)
- Lieutenant Governor of New York: Joseph R. Hanley (Republican)
- Lieutenant Governor of North Carolina: Lynton Y. Ballentine (Democratic)
- Lieutenant Governor of North Dakota: Clarence P. Dahl (Republican)
- Lieutenant Governor of Ohio: George D. Nye (Democratic) (until January 13), Paul M. Herbert (Republican) (starting January 13)
- Lieutenant Governor of Oklahoma: James E. Berry (Democratic)
- Lieutenant Governor of Pennsylvania: John C. Bell Jr. (Republican) (until January 21), Daniel B. Strickler (Republican) (starting January 21)
- Lieutenant Governor of Rhode Island: vacant (until month and day unknown), John S. McKiernan (Democratic) (starting month and day unknown)
- Lieutenant Governor of South Carolina: vacant (until January 21), George Bell Timmerman Jr. (Democratic) (starting January 21)
- Lieutenant Governor of South Dakota: Sioux K. Grigsby (Republican)
- Lieutenant Governor of Tennessee: Larry Morgan (Democratic) (until month and day unknown), George Oliver Benton (Democratic) (starting month and day unknown)
- Lieutenant Governor of Texas: John Lee Smith (Democratic) (until January 21), Allan Shivers (Democratic) (starting January 21)
- Lieutenant Governor of Vermont: Lee E. Emerson (Republican)
- Lieutenant Governor of Virginia: Lewis Preston Collins II (Democratic)
- Lieutenant Governor of Washington: Victor A. Meyers (Democratic)
- Lieutenant Governor of Wisconsin: Oscar Rennebohm (Republican)

== Events ==
=== January–March ===
- January 15 – Elizabeth Short, an aspiring actress nicknamed the "Black Dahlia", is found brutally murdered in a vacant lot in Los Angeles. The case has never been solved.
- February 3 – P.L. Prattis becomes the first African American news correspondent allowed in the House of Representatives and Senate press galleries.
- February 17 – Cold War: Voice of America begins to transmit radio broadcasts into Eastern Europe and the Soviet Union.
- February 20
  - An explosion at the O'Connor Electro-Plating Company in Los Angeles, California, leaves 17 dead, 100 buildings damaged, and a 22-foot-deep (6.7 m) crater in the ground.
  - Ordnance Corps Hermes project V-2 rocket Blossom I launched into space carrying plant material and fruitflies, the first animals to enter space.
- February 21 – Edwin Land demonstrates the first "instant camera", his Polaroid Land Camera, to a meeting of the Optical Society of America in New York City.
- March 6 – USS Newport News, the first completely air-conditioned warship, is launched in Newport News, Virginia.
- March 13 – The 19th Academy Awards ceremony, hosted by Jack Benny, is held at Shrine Auditorium in Los Angeles. William Wyler's The Best Years of Our Lives receives the most nominations with eight and wins the most awards with seven, including Best Motion Picture and Wyler's second Best Director award.
- March 25 – A coal mine explosion in Centralia, Illinois, kills 111 miners.

=== April–June ===
- April 1 – Jackie Robinson signs with the Brooklyn Dodgers, becoming the first African American Major League Baseball player since the 1880s.
- April 6 – The 1st Tony Awards, recognizing achievement in American theater, are awarded at the Waldorf-Astoria Hotel in New York City.
- April 9
  - Multiple tornadoes strike Texas, Oklahoma, and Kansas killing 181 and injuring 970.
  - The Journey of Reconciliation begins, organized by the Congress of Racial Equality.
- April 15 – Jackie Robinson becomes the first African American to play Major League Baseball since the 1880s.
- April 16
  - Texas City Disaster: The ammonium nitrate cargo of French-registered Liberty ship SS Grandcamp explodes in Texas City, Texas, killing at least 581, including all but one member of the city fire department, injuring at least 5,000 and destroying 20 city blocks. Of the dead, remains of 113 are never found and 63 are unidentifiable.
  - American financier and presidential adviser Bernard Baruch describes the post–World War II tensions between the Soviet Union and the United States as a "Cold War".
- April 26 – Academy award-winning Tom and Jerry cartoon, The Cat Concerto, is released to theatres.
- May 6 – Wisconsin earthquake with a maximum Mercalli intensity of V (Moderate).
- May 22
  - Cold War: In an effort to fight the spread of Communism, President Harry S. Truman signs an Act of Congress that implements the Truman Doctrine. This Act grants $400 million in military and economic aid to Turkey and Greece.
  - David Lean's film Great Expectations, based on the novel by Charles Dickens, opens in the U.S. Critics call it the finest film ever made from a Charles Dickens novel.
- June – Langer's Deli opens in Los Angeles.
- June 5 – Secretary of State George Marshall outlines the Marshall Plan for American reconstruction and relief aid to Europe.
- June 23 – The United States Senate follows the House of Representatives in overriding President Truman's veto of the Taft-Hartley Act.
- June 24 – Kenneth Arnold makes the first widely reported UFO sighting near Mount Rainier, Washington. The Arnold sighting marks the start of the 1947 flying disc craze.

=== July–September ===
- July 4 – Three crew members aboard United Airlines Flight 105 reported seeing multiple unidentified objects in the skies over the Pacific Northwest
- July 5 - Larry Doby becomes the first African American to ever play baseball in the American League, and the first in Major League Baseball after Jackie Robinson
- July 7 – A supposedly downed extraterrestrial spacecraft is reportedly found in the Roswell UFO incident, near Roswell, New Mexico, which will be written about by Stanton T. Friedman and many others. In Arizona, the Rhodes UFO photographs are taken, purportedly showing "shoe-heel"-shaped object in the skies over Phoenix.
- July 11 – A hoaxed flying disc is recovered in Twin Falls
- July 18 – President Truman signs the Presidential Succession Act into law, which places the speaker of the House and the president pro tempore of the Senate next in the line of succession after the vice president.
- July 26 – Cold War: President Truman signs the National Security Act of 1947 into law, creating the Central Intelligence Agency, the Department of Defense, the Joint Chiefs of Staff, and the National Security Council.
- August – Fernwood Park race riot in Chicago.
- August 1 – A B-25 departing McChord Field bound for Hamilton Field crashes near Kelso, Washington, killing both pilot and co-pilot. It is subsequently revealed that plane was returning from investigating a UFO sighting at Maury Island. Seaman Harold Dahl claims to have seen six UFOs near Maury Island in Puget Sound, Washington on June 21 and reports the first modern so-called "Men in Black" encounter.
- August 29 – US announces the discovery of plutonium fission, suitable for nuclear power generation.
- September 17–21 – The 1947 Fort Lauderdale Hurricane in southeastern Florida, and also in Alabama, Mississippi, and Louisiana, causes widespread damage and kills 51 people.
- September 17 – Office of Indian Affairs renamed Bureau of Indian Affairs.
- September 18 – Most provisions of the National Security Act go into effect, reorganizing the military to form the National Military Establishment (later the Department of Defense) with subordinate Departments of the Army, Navy, and Air Force; creating the Central Intelligence Agency and the National Security Council; and establishing the Secretary of Defense.
- September 26 – U.S. Air Force is made a separate branch of the military.
- September 27 – Walt Disney Productions' ninth feature film, Fun and Fancy Free, is released. It is Disney's fourth of six package films to be released through the 1940s and notably features Walt Disney's final voice role as Mickey Mouse.

=== October–December ===
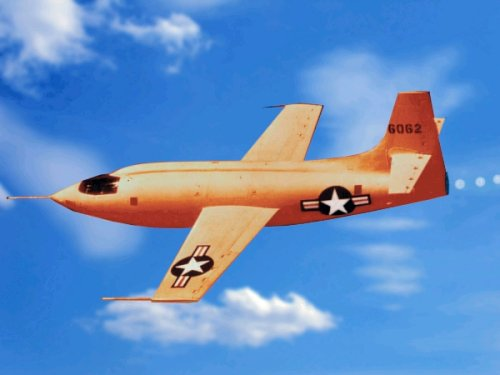
October 14: Chuck Yeager breaks the sound barrier in the Bell X-1

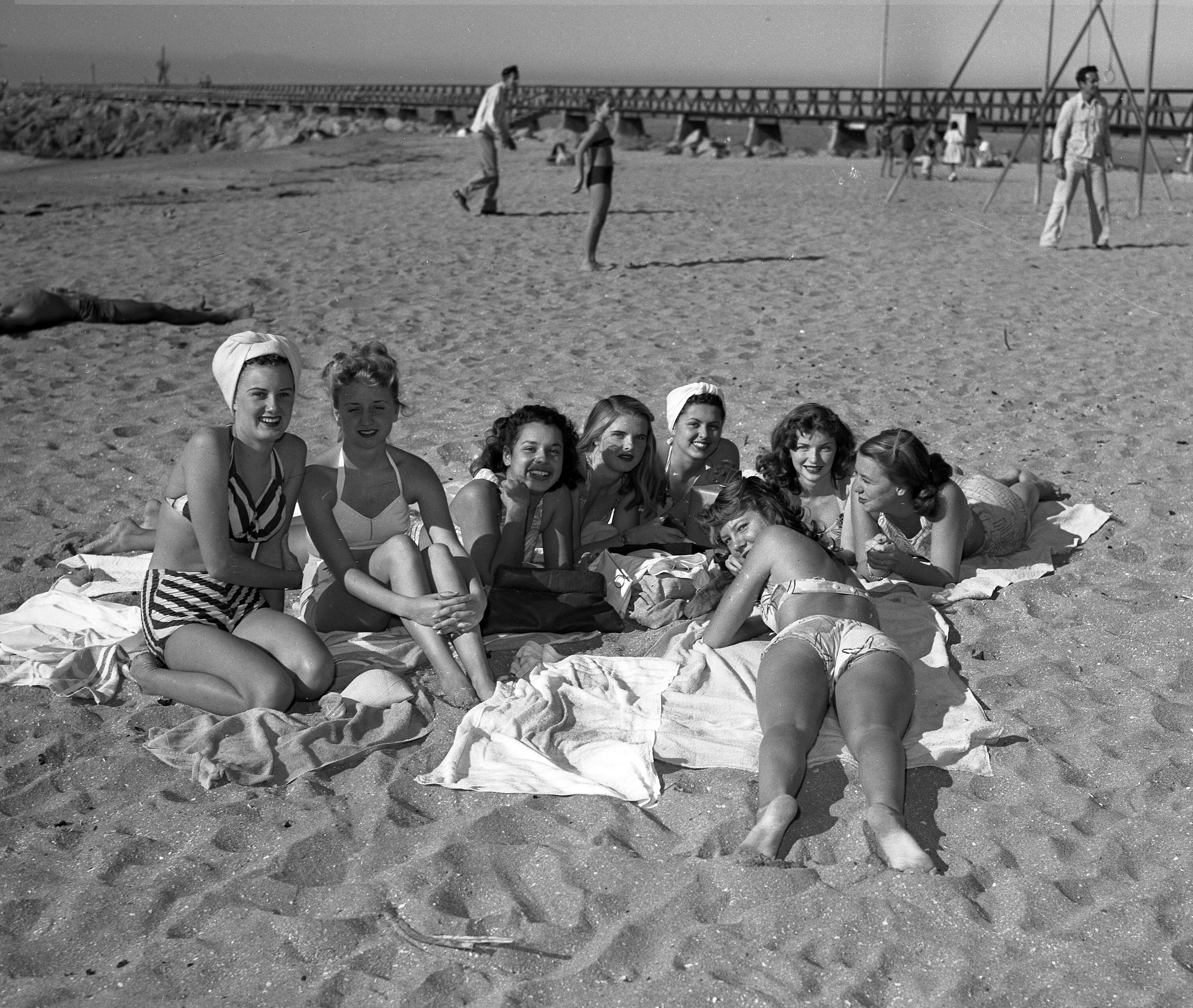
Girls sunbathing at Cabrillo Beach, California, Dec. 28, 1947

- October–November – Great Fires of 1947: Forest fires in Maine consume more than 200,000 acres of wooded land statewide, including over 17,000 acres on Mount Desert Island alone. 16 persons are killed and more than 1,000 homes destroyed in the blazes, with total property damage exceeding $23 million.
- October – The House Un-American Activities Committee begins its investigations into communism in Hollywood.
- October 6 – World Series games are broadcast on television for the first time.
  - The New York Yankees defeat the Brooklyn Dodgers, 4 games to 3, to win their 11th World Series Title.
- October 14 – The United States Air Force test pilot Captain Chuck Yeager flies a Bell X-1 rocket plane faster than the speed of sound, the first time that this has been accomplished in level flight, or climbing.
- October 20 – Pakistan establishes diplomatic relations with the United States.
- November 1 – U.S. Caribbean Command designated.
- November 2 – In California, designer Howard Hughes pilots the maiden flight of the Hughes H-4 Hercules flying boat known as "Spruce Goose", the largest fixed-wing aircraft ever built; the flight lasts only eight minutes and the craft is never flown again.
- November 6 – The program Meet the Press makes its television debut on the NBC-TV network in the United States.
- November 24 – Red Scare: The U.S. House of Representatives votes 346–17 to approve citations of Contempt of Congress against the so-called Hollywood 10, after the ten men refuse to co-operate with the House Un-American Activities Committee concerning allegations of communist influences in the movie business. (The ten men are blacklisted by the Hollywood movie studios on the following day).
- December 3 – The Tennessee Williams play A Streetcar Named Desire opens in a Broadway theater.
- December 6 – Arturo Toscanini conducts a concert performance of the first half of Giuseppe Verdi's opera Otello, based on Shakespeare's play Othello, for a broadcast on NBC Radio. The second half of the opera is broadcast a week later.
- December 22 – The first practical electronic transistor is demonstrated by John Bardeen and Walter Brattain working under William Shockley at AT&T's Bell Labs.

=== Ongoing ===
- Cold War (1947–1991)
- Second Red Scare (1947–1957)
- Baby boom (1946–1964)

== Births ==
=== January ===
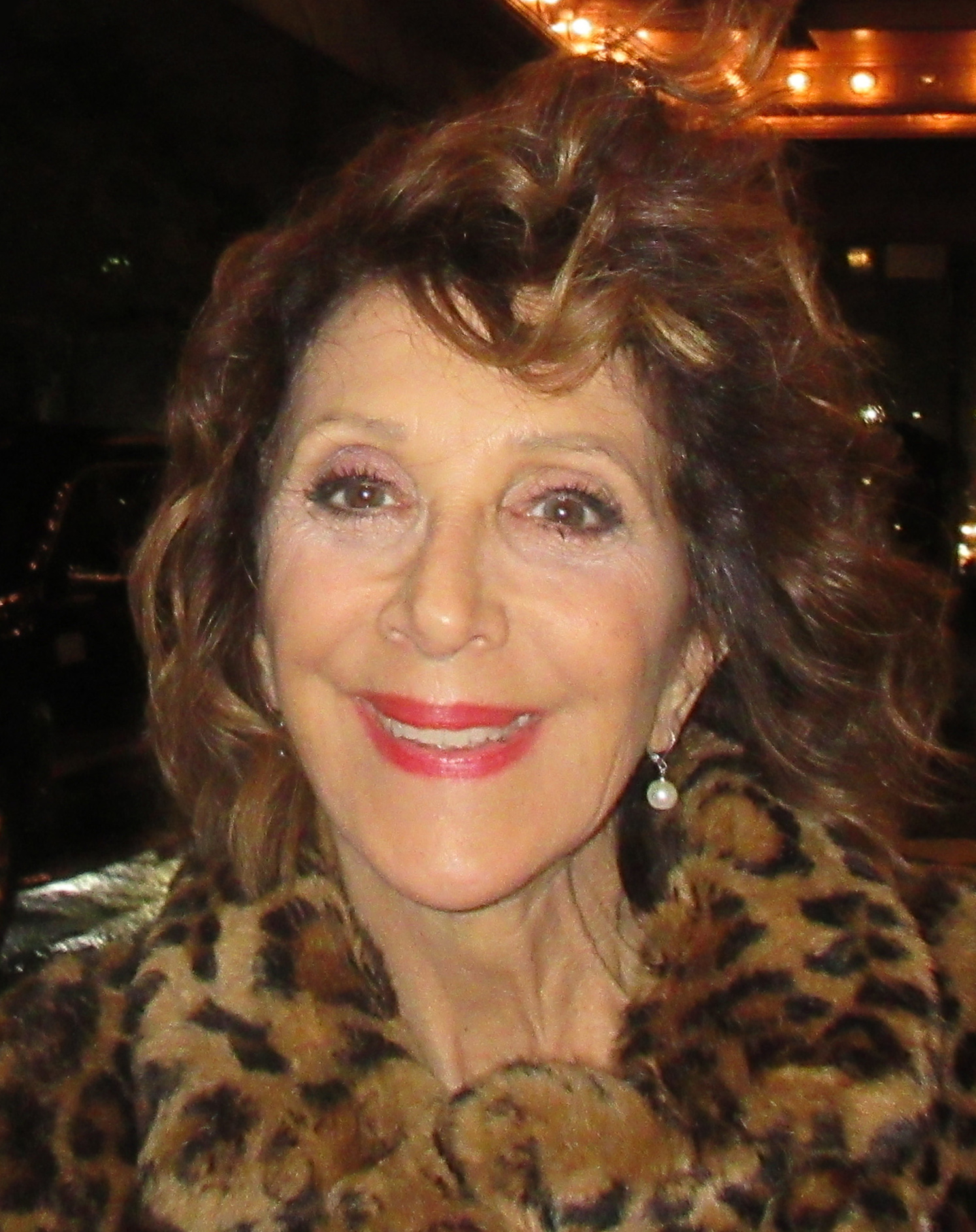
Andrea Martin

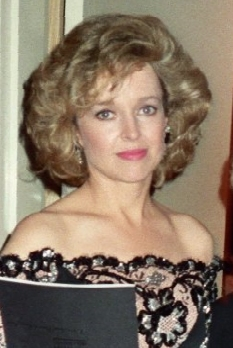
Jill Eikenberry

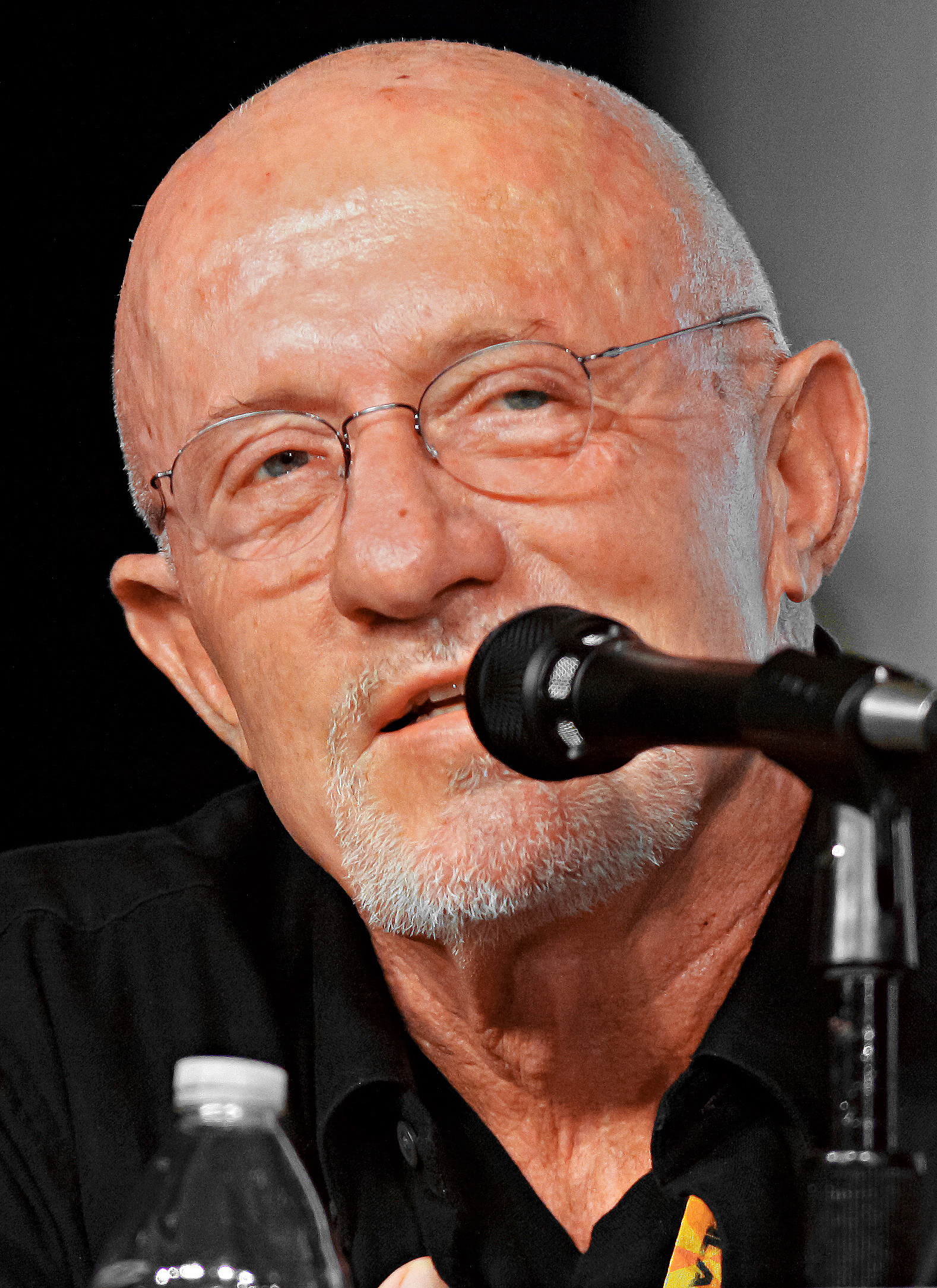
Jonathan Banks

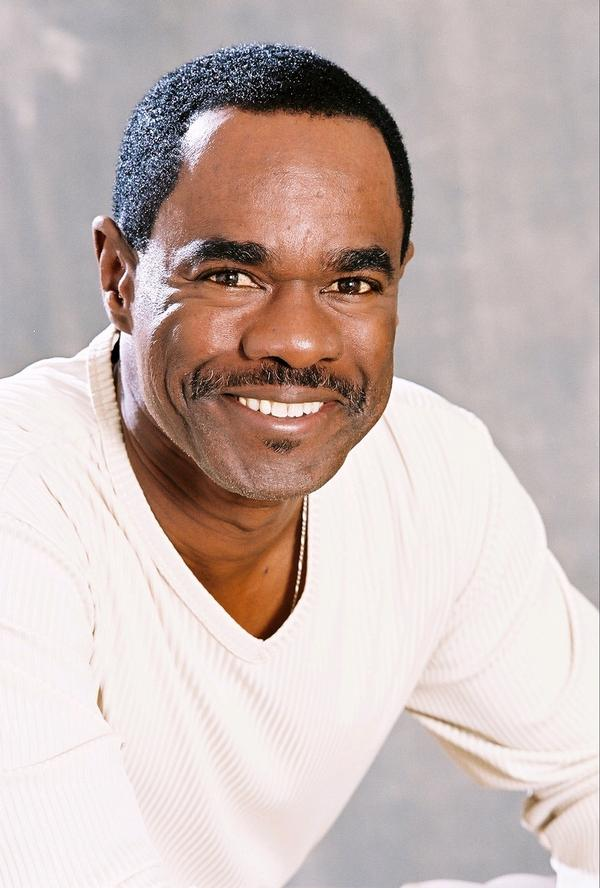
Glynn Turman

- January 1
  - Jon Corzine, American politician
  - Leon Patillo, American singer and evangelist
  - Leonard Thompson, American golfer
- January 2 – Jack Hanna, American zoologist
- January 4 – George Atkinson, American footballer player (d. 2025)
- January 5
  - Mike DeWine, American politician
  - Mercury Morris, American football player (d. 2024)
- January 7 – Scott Reid, American baseball player and scout (d. 2021)
- January 8
  - William Bonin, American serial killer (d. 1996)
  - David Gates, American journalist and novelist
  - Pat Hays, American lawyer and politician (d. 2023)
  - Laurie Walters, American actress
- January 9 – Ronnie Landfield, American artist
- January 10
  - George Alec Effinger, American science fiction author (d. 2002)
  - Afeni Shakur, American music businesswoman (d. 2016)
- January 15 – Andrea Martin, Canadian-American actress (Second City Television)
- January 16 – Laura Schlessinger, American radio and TV talk show host
- January 19
  - Ann Compton, American journalist
  - Paula Deen, American Food Channel television personality
- January 21
  - Jill Eikenberry, American actress
  - Bill Stein, American baseball player
- January 22
  - Saner Wonggoun, Thai American fugitive
- January 23
  - Tom Carper, American politician
  - Joel Douglas, American film producer
- January 24
  - Michio Kaku, American theoretical physicist and science popularizer
  - Warren Zevon, American rock musician (Werewolves of London) (d. 2003)
- January 25 – Marjorie Scardino, American-born business executive
- January 26 – Mark Dayton, American politician
- January 27 – Cal Schenkel, American illustrator
- January 28 – Jeanne Shaheen, American politician
- January 29
  - Linda B. Buck, American biologist, winner of the Nobel Prize in Physiology or Medicine.
  - Ernie Lively, American actor (d. 2021)
- January 31
  - Jonathan Banks, American actor
  - Nolan Ryan, American baseball player
  - Glynn Turman, African-American actor

=== February ===
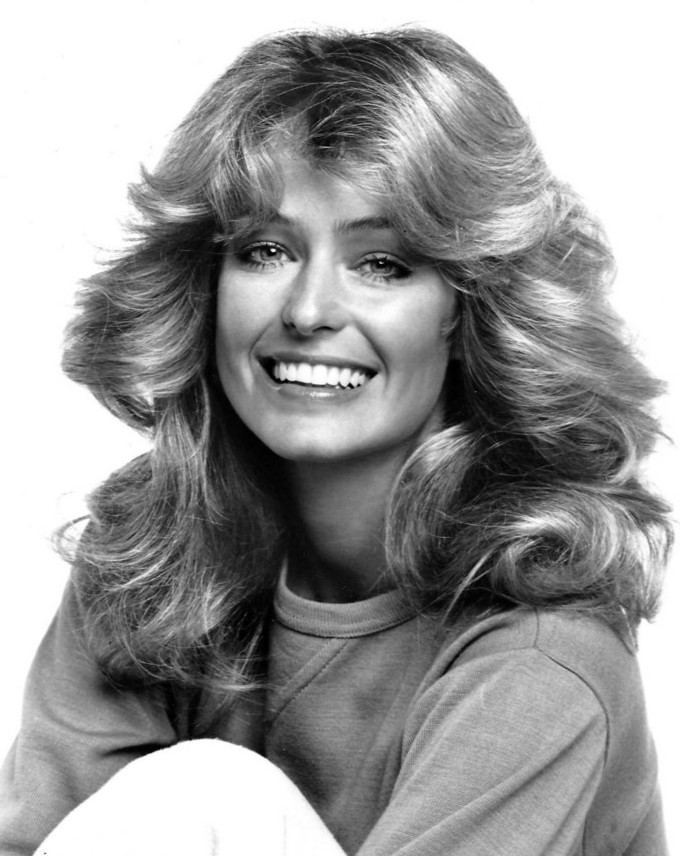
Farrah Fawcett

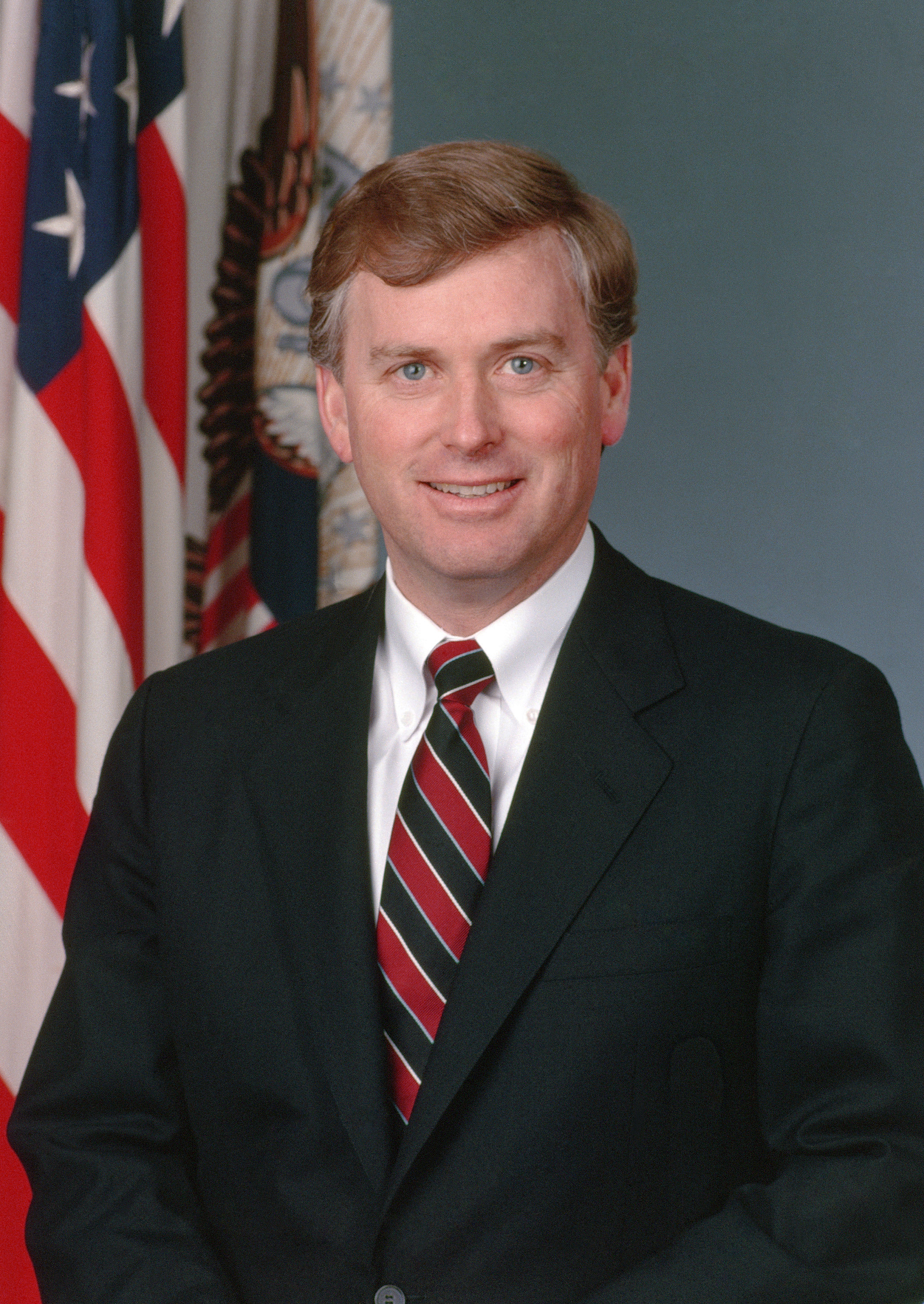
Dan Quayle

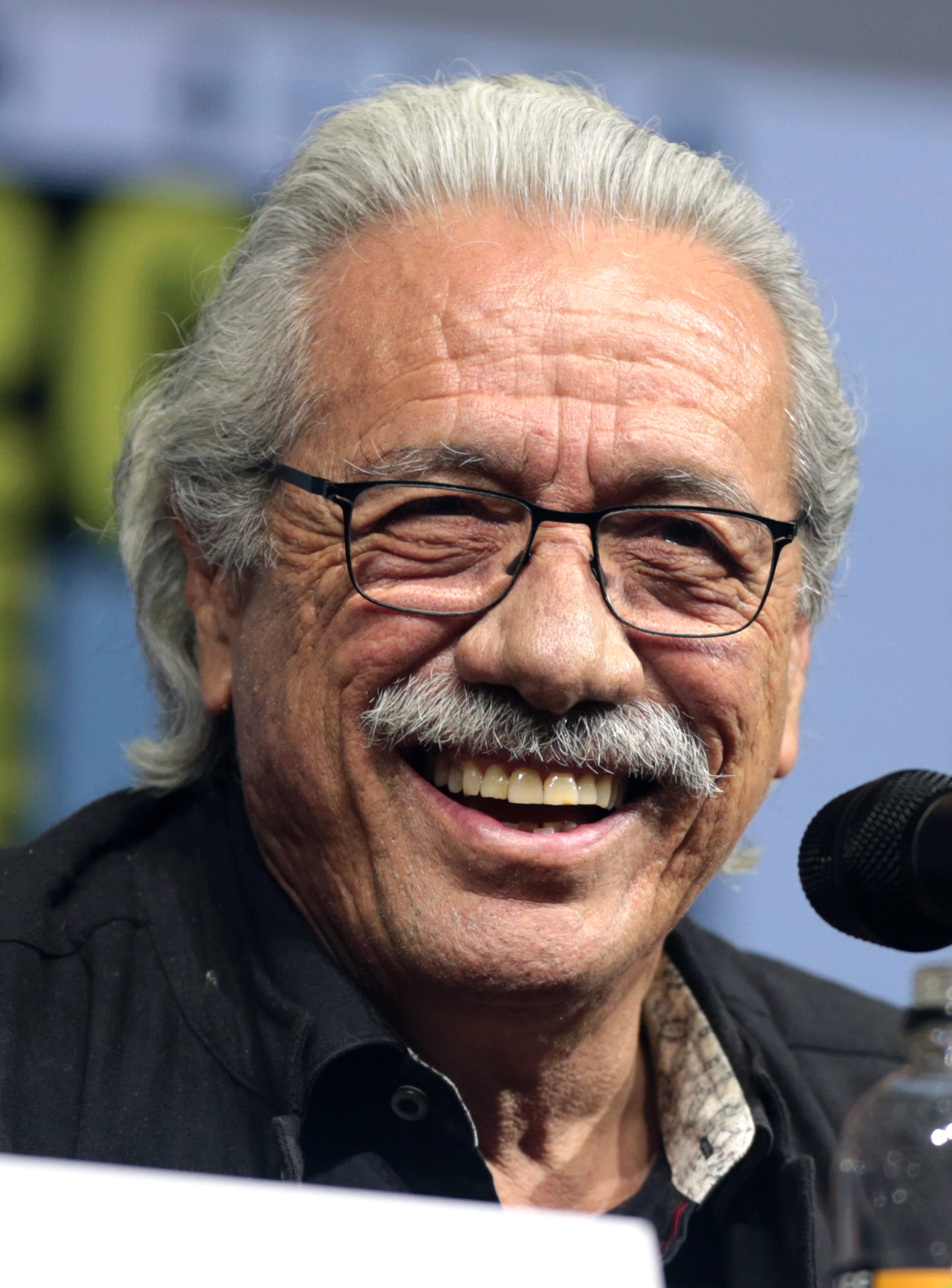
Edward James Olmos

- February 1 – Jessica Savitch, American journalist (d. 1983)
- February 2 – Farrah Fawcett, American actress (Charlie's Angels) (d. 2009)
- February 3
  - Paul Auster, American novelist (d. 2024)
  - Joe Coleman, American baseball player (d. 2025)
  - Melanie (Safka), American folk singer-songwriter (Candles in the Rain) (d. 2024)
- February 4
  - Sanford Bishop, African-American politician
  - Dennis C. Blair, American admiral, Director of National Intelligence
  - Dan Quayle, American politician, 44th vice president of the United States from 1989 to 1993
- February 5 – Darrell Waltrip, American race car driver, broadcaster
- February 7 – Wayne Allwine, American voice actor (d. 2009)
- February 8 – J. Richard Gott, American astronomer and academic
- February 9
  - Joe Ely, American singer, guitarist and songwriter (d. 2025)
  - Erik Olin Wright, American sociologist (d. 2019)
- February 11 – Roy Moore, American politician
- February 13
  - Avel Gordly, American politician and activist (d. 2026)
  - Mike Krzyzewski, American basketball coach
- February 15
  - John Adams, American composer
  - Rusty Hamer, American actor (d. 1990)
- February 18 – Dennis DeYoung, American rock musician (Styx)
- February 20 – Peter Strauss, American actor
- February 24
  - Mike Fratello, basketball player, coach, and sportscaster
  - Edward James Olmos, Hispanic-American actor, director, producer and activist
- February 25
  - Lee Evans, American Olympic athlete (d. 2021)
  - Doug Yule, American rock singer (The Velvet Underground)

=== March ===
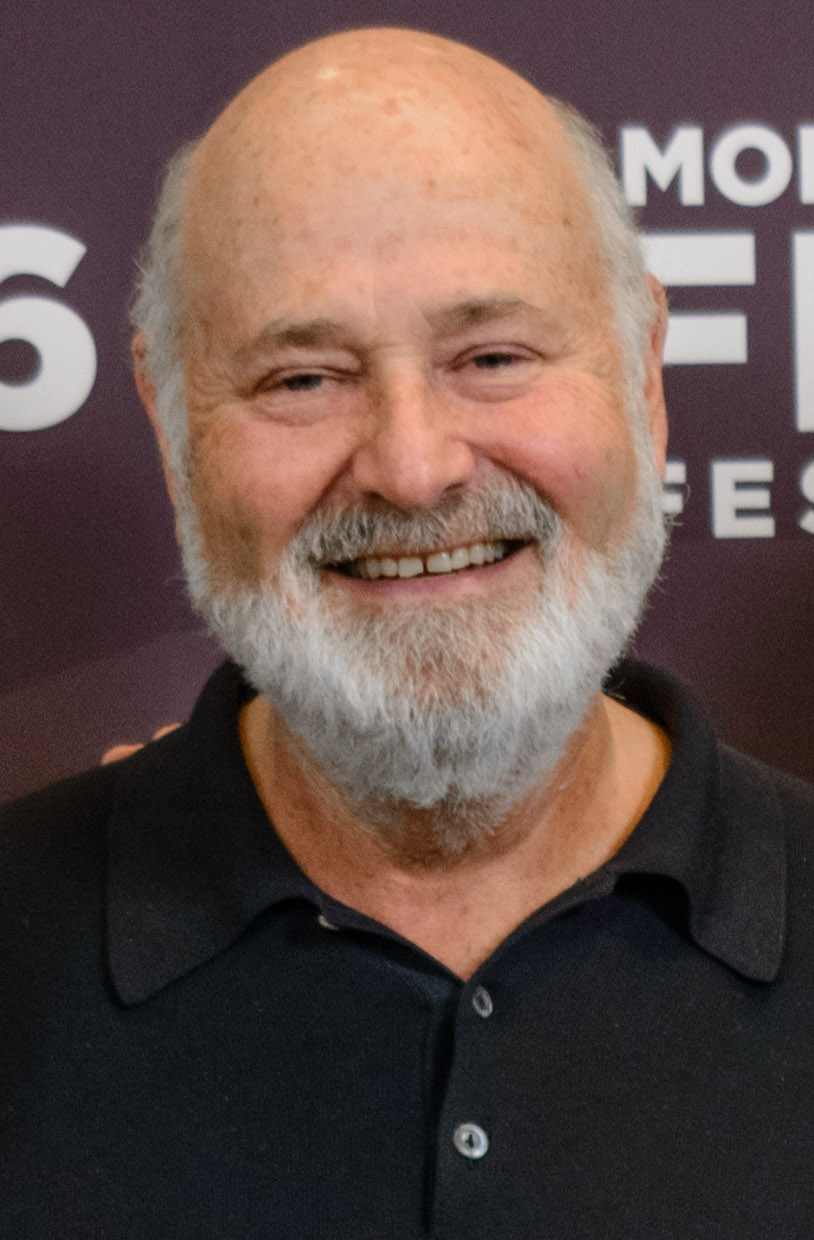
Rob Reiner

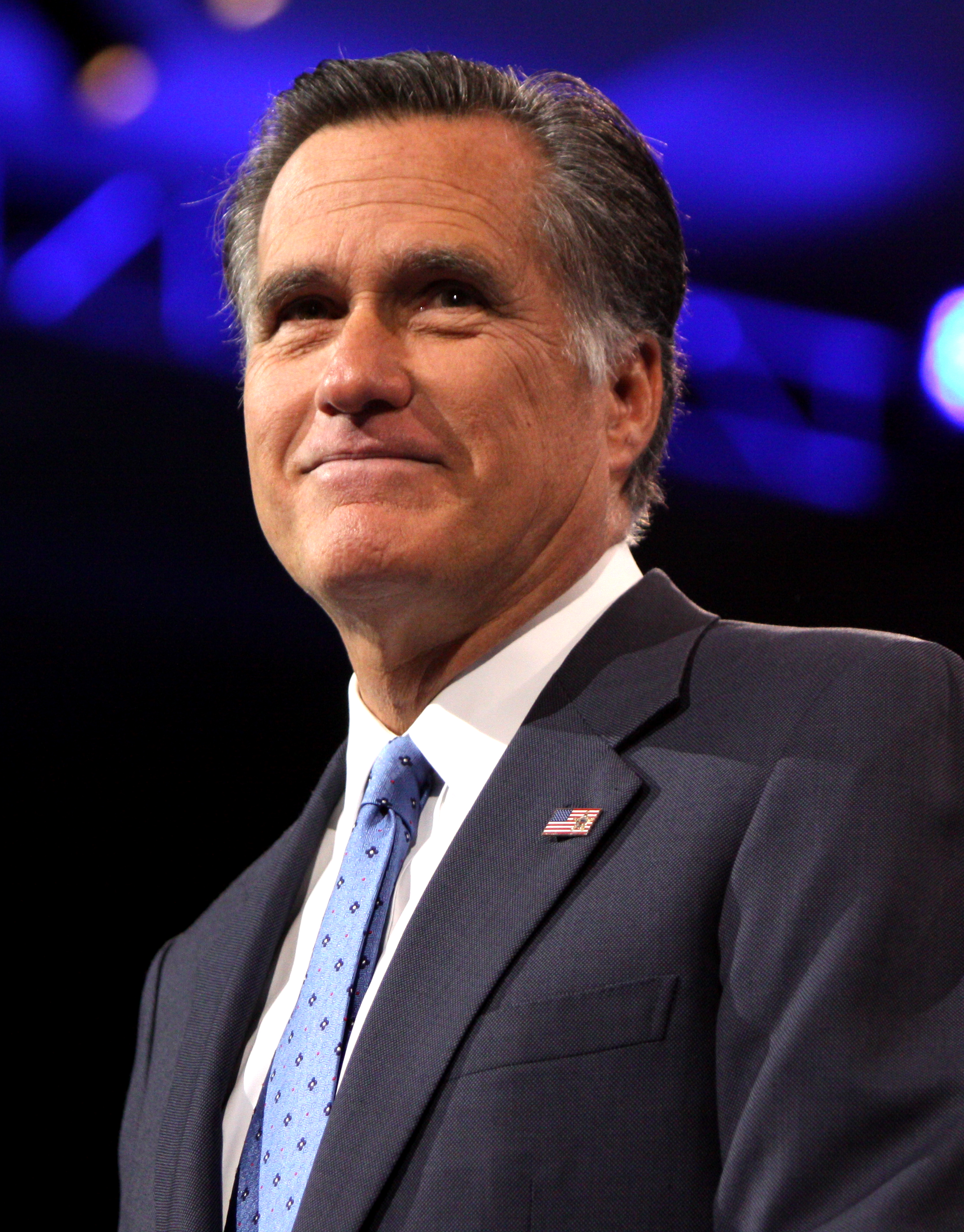
Mitt Romney

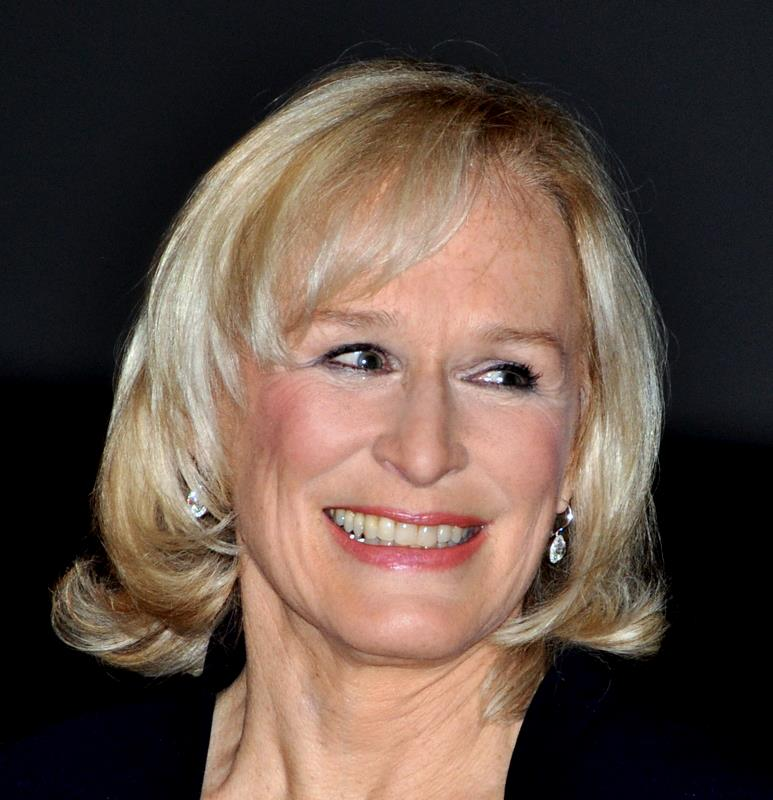
Glenn Close

- March 4 – David Franzoni, American screenwriter
- March 5 – Ottis Toole, murderer (d. 1996)
- March 6
  - Dick Fosbury, American high-jumper (d. 2023)
  - Rob Reiner, American actor, comedian, producer, director and activist (All in the Family) (d. 2025)
  - John Stossel, American journalist
  - Reagan Wilson, American model and actress (d. 2026)
- March 8 – Michael S. Hart, American author, inventor (d. 2011)
- March 10
  - Doug Fisher, American football player (d. 2023)
  - Tom Scholz, American musician, songwriter and inventor
- March 11
  - David Ferguson, American music producer, activist (d. 2015)
  - Mark Stein, American singer-songwriter and keyboard player
- March 12 – Mitt Romney, American politician
- March 14 – William Jefferson, African-American politician
- March 15 – Ry Cooder, American guitarist
- March 18 – Drew Struzan, American poster artist (d. 2025)
- March 19 – Glenn Close, American actress
- March 20
  - John Boswell, American historian (d. 1994)
  - Chip Zien, American actor
- March 21 – Bill Plummer, American baseball player and coach (d. 2024)
- March 22
  - Babz Chula, American-born Canadian actress (d. 2010)
  - James Patterson, American author
  - Florence Warner, American singer, voice actress (Once Upon a Forest) (d. 2024)
- March 27
  - Walt Mossberg, American newspaper columnist
  - Doug Wilkerson, American footballer (d. 2021)
- March 28 – Paul Jackson, American bassist and composer (d. 2021)

=== April ===
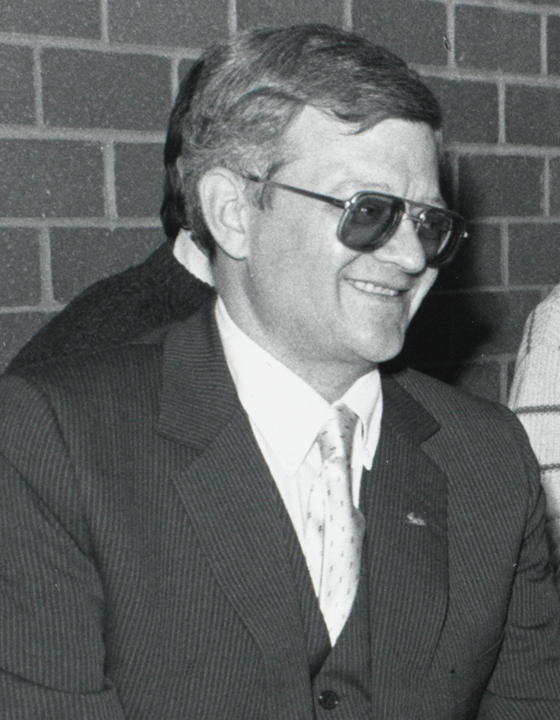
Tom Clancy

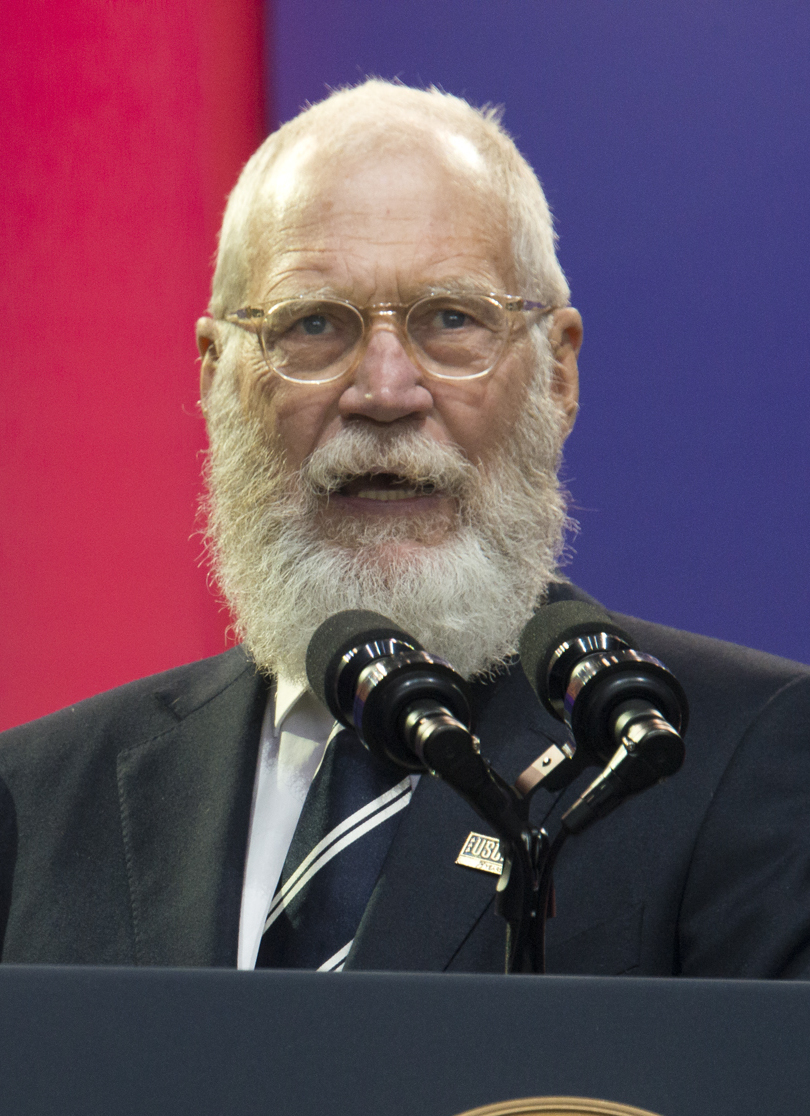
David Letterman

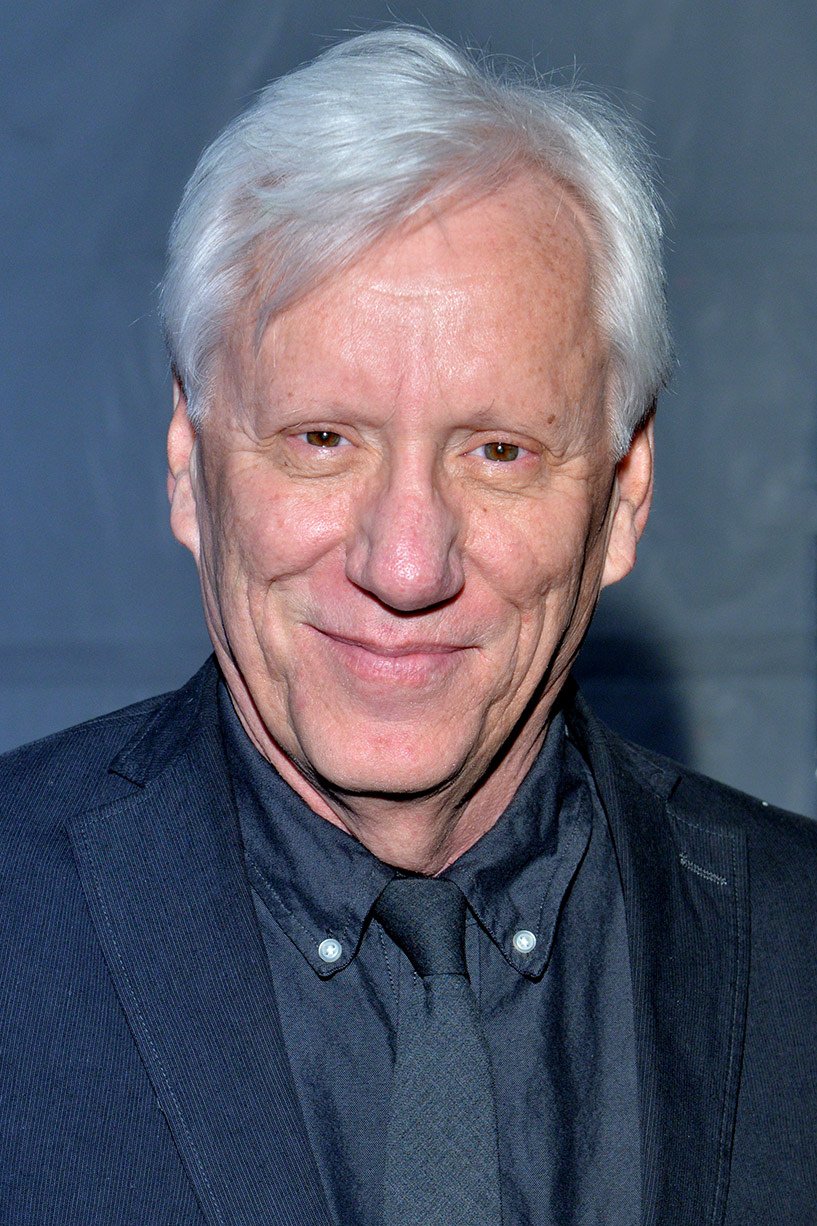
James Woods

- April 1
  - Ray Mouton, American lawyer (died 2026)
  - Francine Prose, American fiction writer and critic
  - Norm Van Lier, basketball player, coach and sportscaster (died 2009)
- April 2
  - Emmylou Harris, American country singer-songwriter
  - Camille Paglia, American literary critic
- April 4 – Ray Fosse, baseball player and broadcaster (died 2021)
- April 6 – John Ratzenberger, American actor (Cheers)
- April 8
  - Tom DeLay, American conservative politician
  - Robert Kiyosaki, American investor, businessman and self-help author
- April 9 – Ken Lewis, CEO, president and chairman of Bank of America
- April 11
  - Meshach Taylor, African-American actor (died 2014)
  - Lucian Truscott IV, American writer, journalist
- April 12
  - Tom Clancy, American author (died 2013)
  - Woody Johnson, American businessman and philanthropist
  - Dan Lauria, American actor
  - David Letterman, American talk show host
- April 15
  - Lois Chiles, American actress
  - Roy Raymond, American entrepreneur (Victoria's Secret) (died 1993)
- April 16
  - Kareem Abdul-Jabbar, African-American basketball player and actor (Airplane!)
  - Frank Hamblen, American basketball coach (died 2017)
- April 18
  - Kathy Acker, American author (died 1997)
  - James Woods, American actor
- April 19 – Murray Perahia, American pianist
- April 20 – Andrew Tobias, American journalist and author
- April 21 – Iggy Pop, American rock musician
- April 22 – Norma Harris, American sprinter
- April 25
  - Richard Bowdry, African-American stock car driver
  - Jeffrey DeMunn, American actor
- April 28 – Ken St. Andre, American game designer and author (died 2026)
- April 29
  - Tommy James, American rock singer, producer
  - Jim Ryun, American middle-distance runner and Congressman

=== May ===
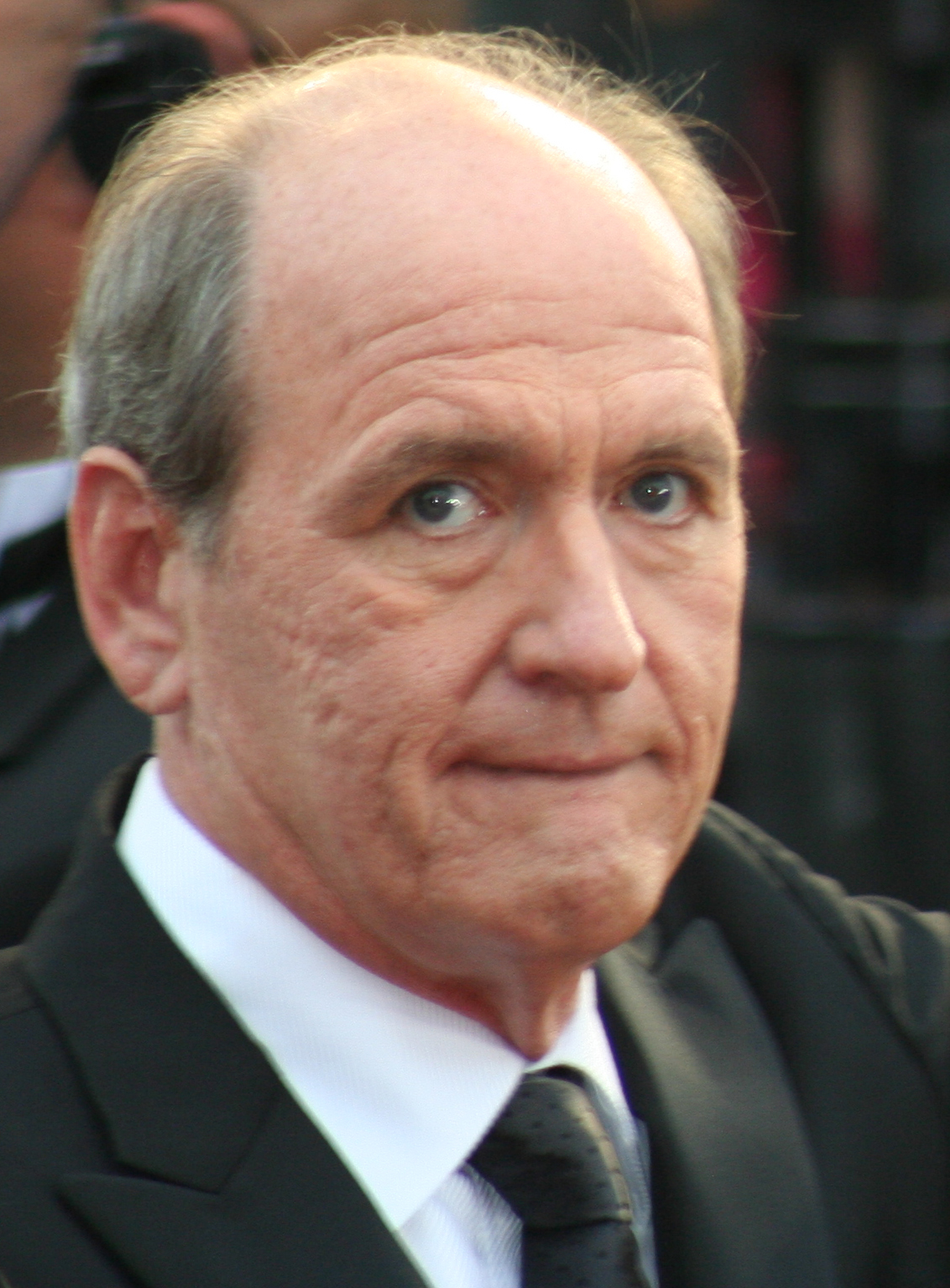
Richard Jenkins

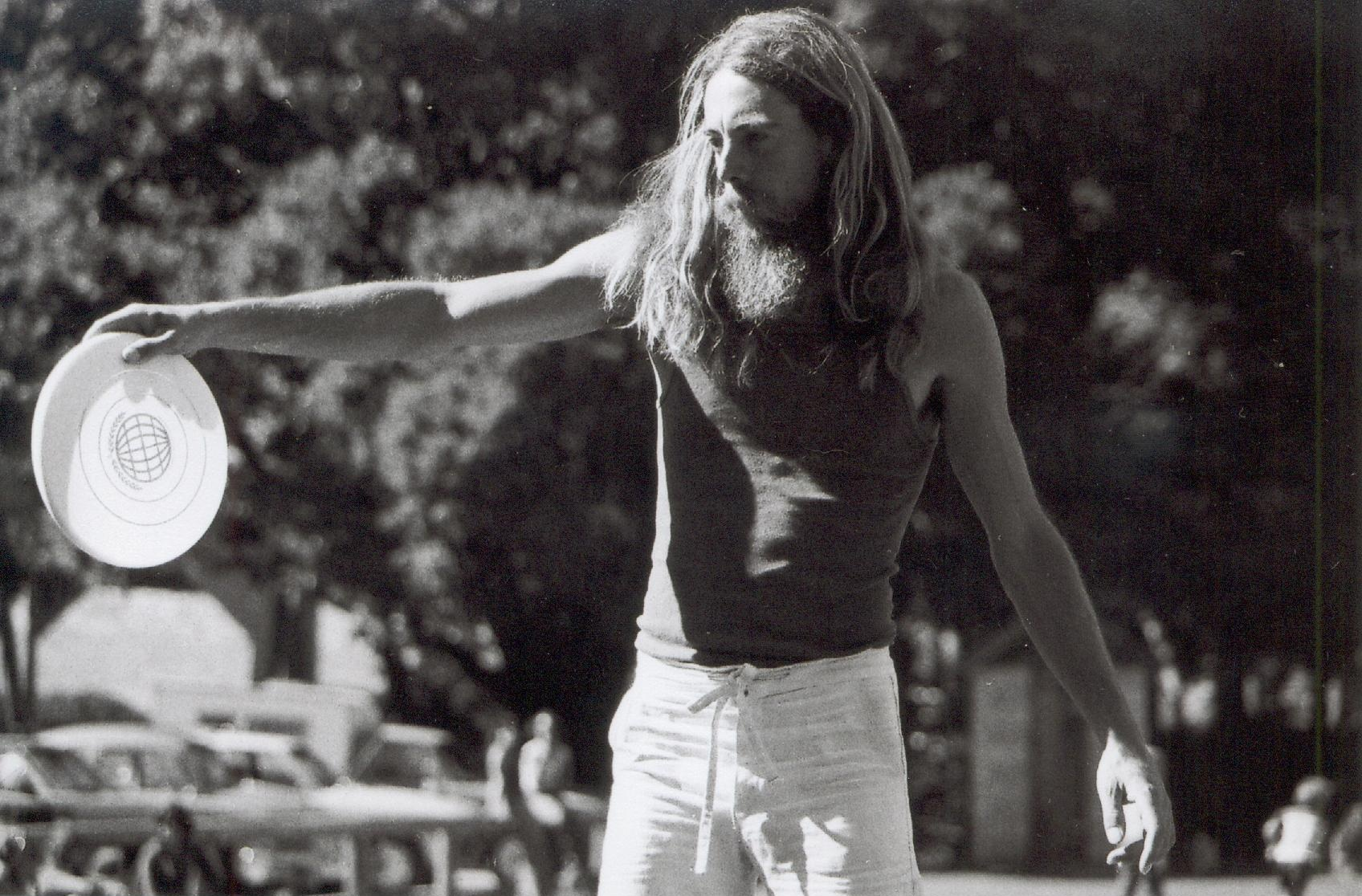
Ken Westerfield

- May 4
  - Richard Jenkins, American actor
  - Theda Skocpol, American sociologist
- May 6 – Martha Nussbaum, American philosopher
- May 8
  - H. Robert Horvitz, American biologist, recipient of the Nobel Prize in Physiology or Medicine
  - Jamie Donnelly, American film, stage actress
- May 10 – Jay Ferguson, American singer-songwriter, keyboard player (Spirit and Jo Jo Gunne)
- May 11 – Butch Trucks, American drummer (The Allman Brothers Band) (d. 2017)
- May 13 – Stephen R. Donaldson, American novelist
- May 14 – Tamara Dobson, African-American actress, fashion model (d. 2006)
- May 16
  - Buddy Roberts, American professional wrestler (d. 2012)
  - Bill Smitrovich, American actor
- May 23
  - Richie Beirach, American jazz pianist and composer (d. 2026)
  - Ken Westerfield, American disc sports (Frisbee) pioneer, athlete, showman and promoter
- May 27 – Peter DeFazio, American politician

=== June ===
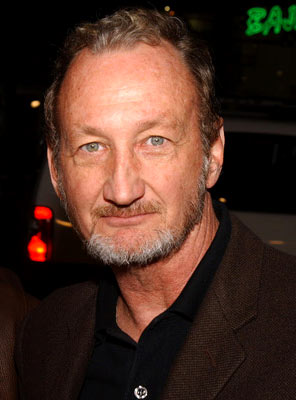
Robert Englund

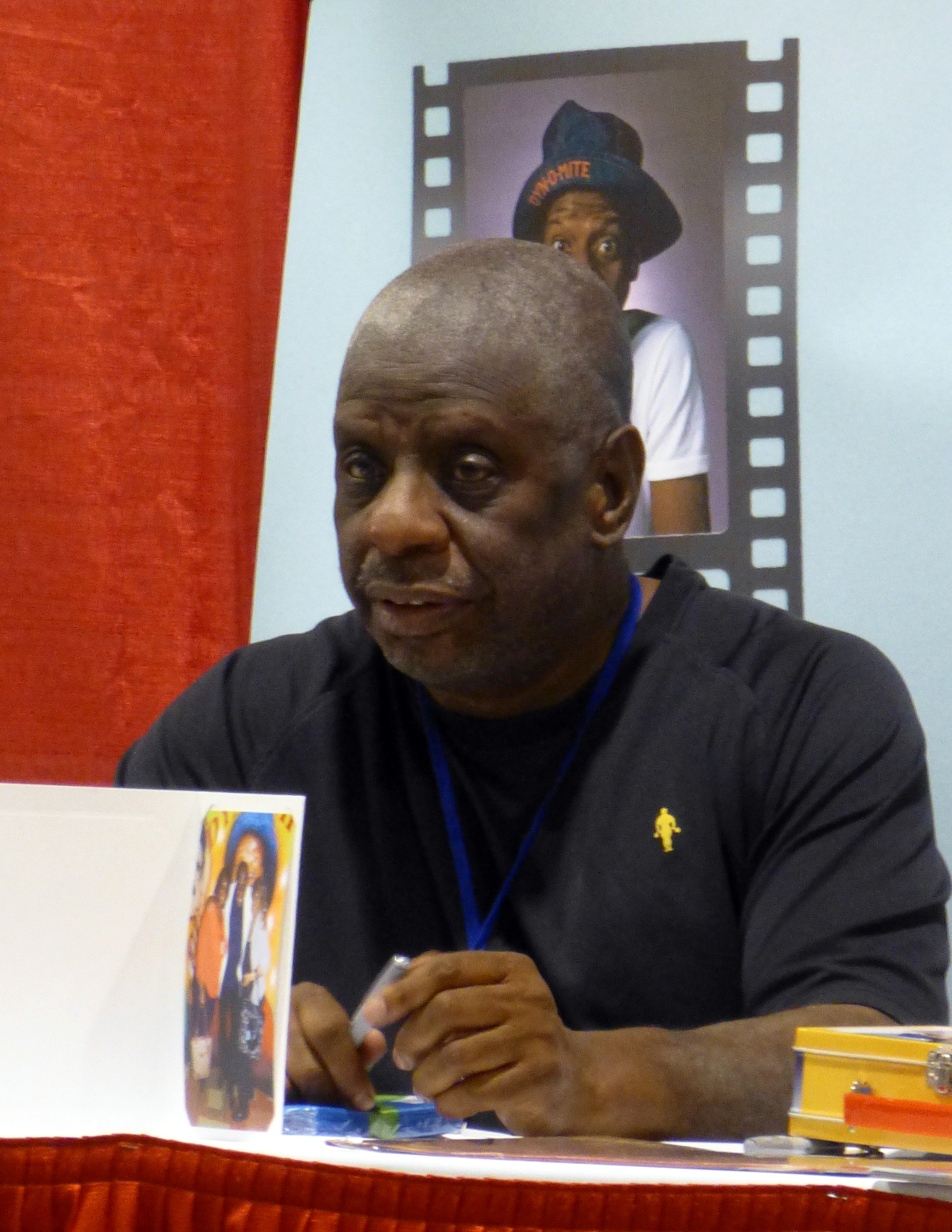
Jimmie Walker

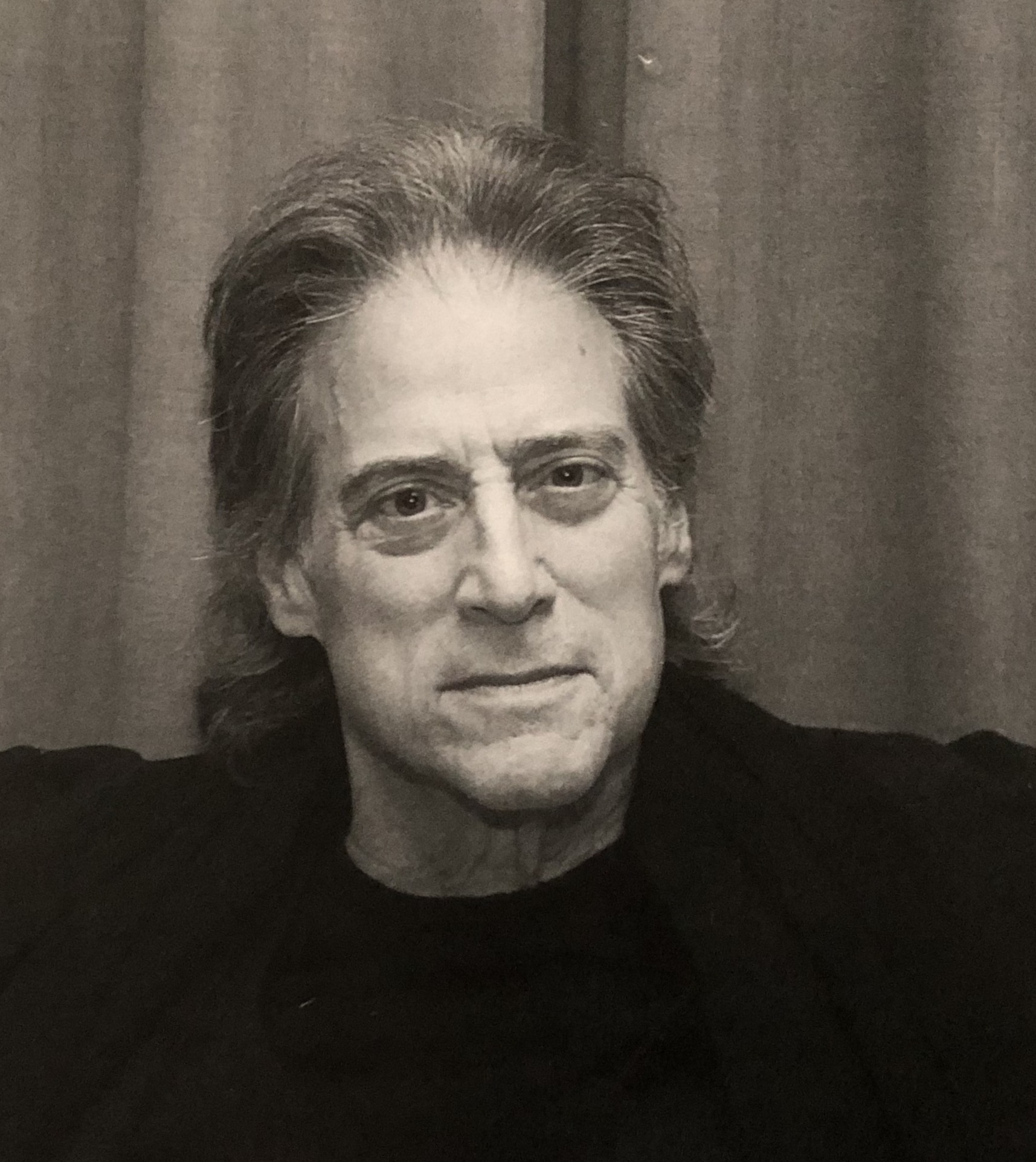
Richard Lewis

- June 3
  - Dave Alexander, American musician (d. 1975)
  - John Dykstra, American special effects artist and producer
- June 5 – Laurie Anderson, American experimental performance artist, composer and musician
- June 6 – Robert Englund, American actor, director and singer
- June 7
  - Thurman Munson, American baseball player (d. 1979)
  - Edward C. Prado, American judge
- June 8
  - Earl Devaney, American Secret Service officer (d. 2022)
  - Eric F. Wieschaus, American biologist, recipient of the Nobel Prize in Physiology or Medicine
- June 14 – Barry Melton, American rock musician (Country Joe and the Fish)
- June 15 – John Hoagland, American war photographer (d. 1984)
- June 16 – Al Cowlings, American football player
- June 19 – Linda Myers, American archer
- June 20 – Candy Clark, American actress
- June 21
  - Meredith Baxter, American actress (Family Ties)
  - Jim Benzelock, American professional ice hockey right winger
  - Michael Gross, American actor (Family Ties)
  - Duane Thomas, American football running back (d. 2024)
- June 22
  - Bobby Douglass, American football quarterback
  - Octavia E. Butler, American author (d. 2006)
  - David Lander, American actor (Laverne and Shirley) (d. 2020)
  - Pete Maravich, American basketball player (d. 1988)
- June 24
  - Peter Weller, American actor, director
  - Walter Willison, American stage actor
- June 25
  - Jimmie Walker, African-American actor (Good Times)
  - John Powell, American track and field athlete (d. 2022)
- June 26 – Edd Hargett, American football quarterback
- June 28 – Mark Helprin, American writer
- June 29
  - Brian Herbert, American author
  - Richard Lewis, American comedian, actor (Robin Hood: Men in Tights, Curb Your Enthusiasm) (d. 2024)

=== July ===
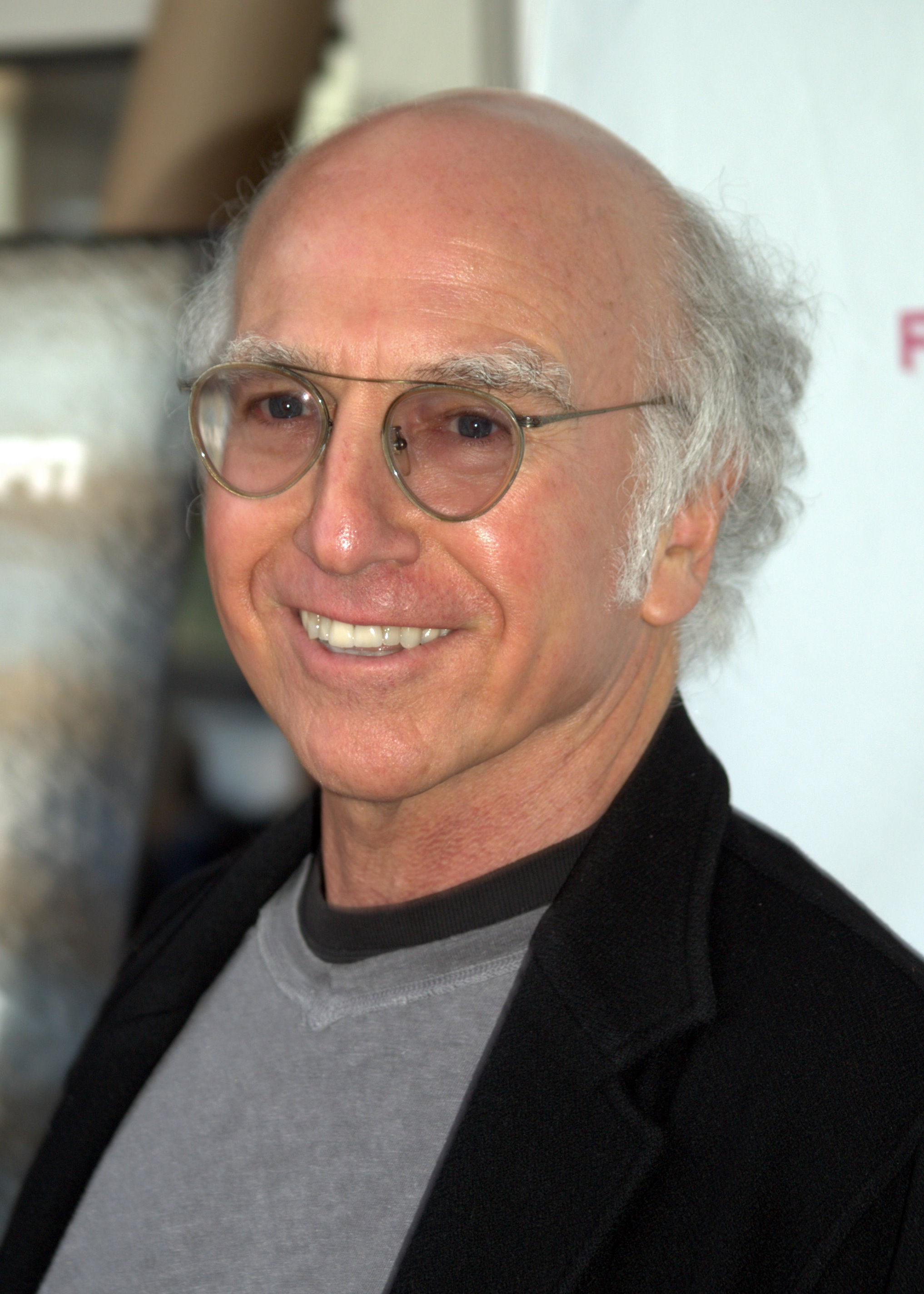
Larry David

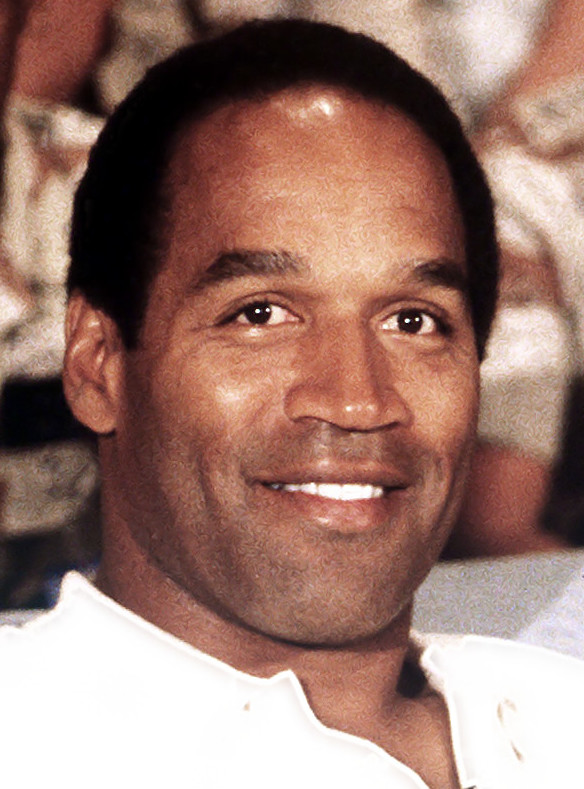
O. J. Simpson

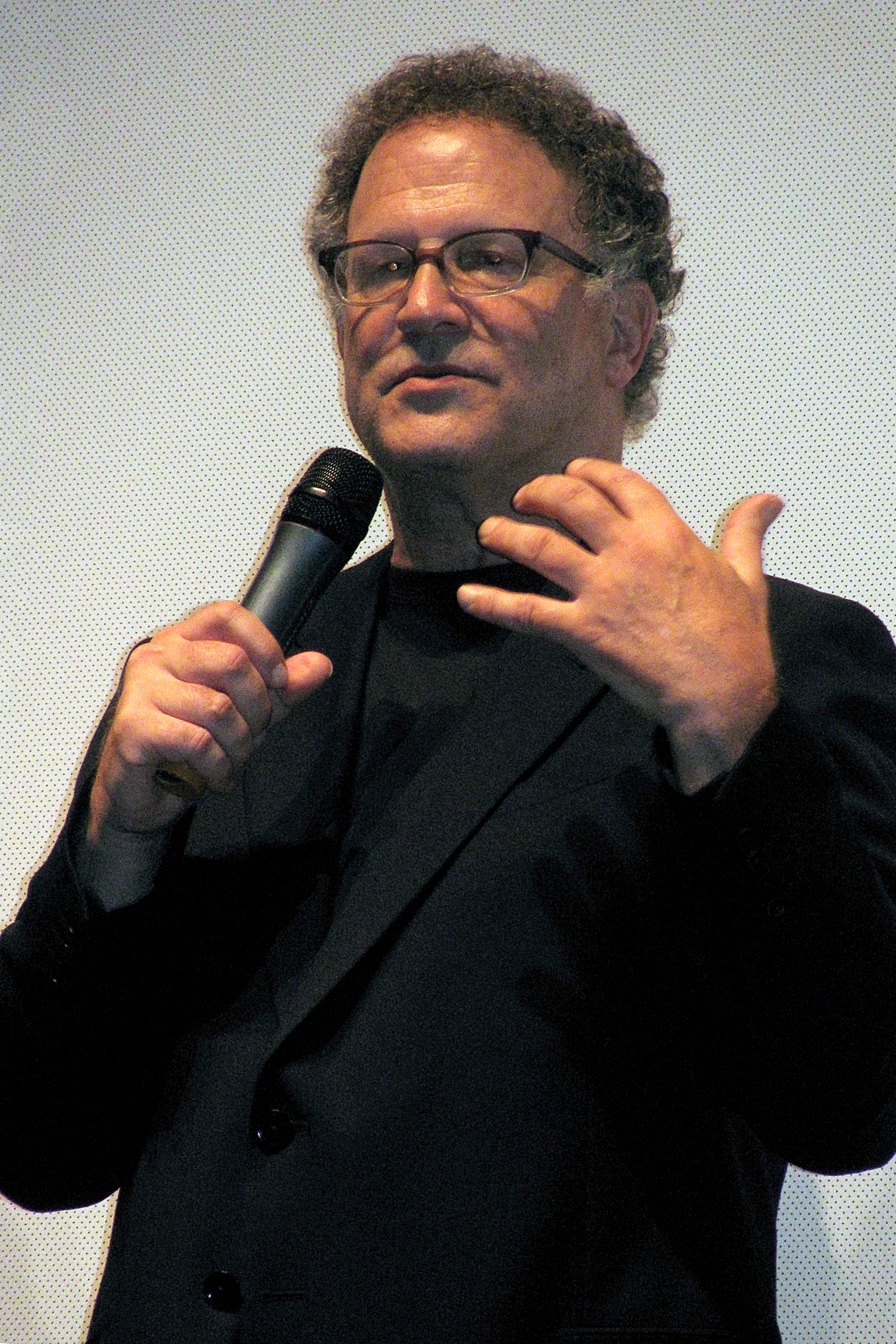
Albert Brooks

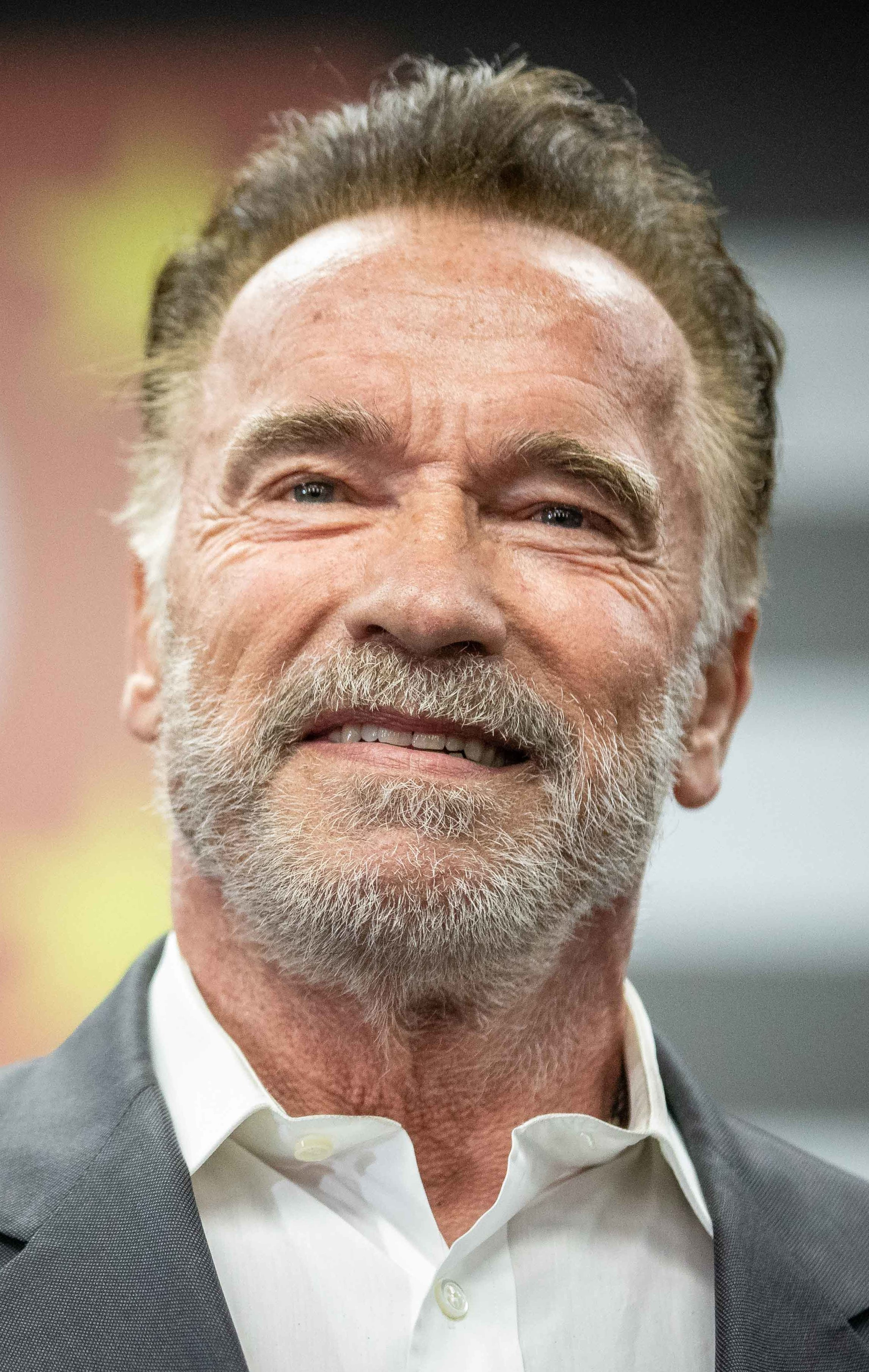
Arnold Schwarzenegger

- July 1 – Marc Benno, American singer, songwriter and guitarist
- July 2 – Larry David, American actor, writer, producer and director (Curb Your Enthusiasm)
- July 3
  - Dave Barry, American writer
  - Betty Buckley, American actress, singer
  - Mike Burton, American swimmer
- July 4 – Jim Minshall, American baseball player
- July 5
  - Todd Akin, American politician (d. 2021)
  - Joe Brown, African-American television judge
  - Dan Hewitt Owens, American actor
- July 6
  - Shelley Hack, American model, actress, producer, political and media advisor
  - Larnelle Harris, African-American Christian musician
- July 7
  - Randy Goodrum, American songwriter, pianist and producer
  - David Hodo, American singer
  - Carl Mauck, American football player
  - Mike Shuster, American journalist (d. 2023)
- July 8 – Bobby Sowell, American pianist and composer
- July 9 – O. J. Simpson, American football player, sportscaster, actor and author, convicted of causing wrongful death and felony (d. 2024)
- July 10 – Arlo Guthrie, American folk singer (Alice's Restaurant)
- July 12 – Loren Coleman, American cryptozoologist, author
- July 15 – Roky Erickson, American singer-songwriter and musician (d. 2019)
- July 16
  - Alexis Herman, American politician (d. 2025)
  - Assata Shakur, American convicted murder (d. 2025)
- July 19 – Bernie Leadon, American musician, songwriter
- July 22
  - Albert Brooks, American actor, comedian, director and novelist
  - Erica Gavin, American film actress
  - Don Henley, American singer, songwriter and musician
- July 23 – Spencer Christian, American television personality
- July 24
  - Robert Hays, American actor
  - Peter Serkin, American pianist (d. 2020)
- July 25 – Scott Shannon, American disc jockey
- July 27 – Bob Klein, American football player
- July 30
  - William Atherton, American actor
  - Arnold Schwarzenegger, Austrian-American actor, bodybuilder and politician
- July 31 – Joe Wilson, American politician

=== August ===
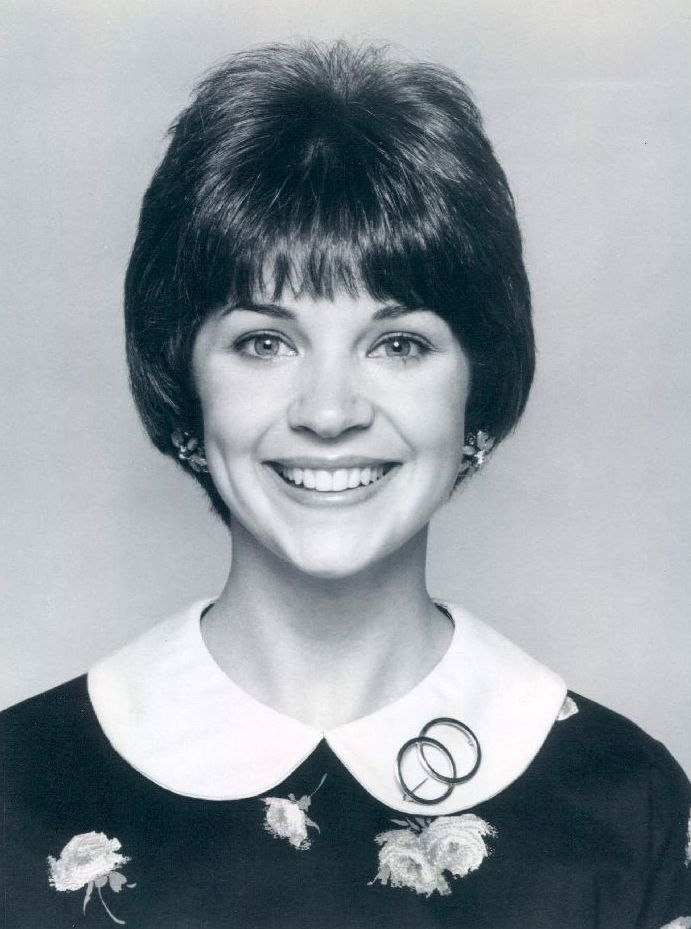
Cindy Williams

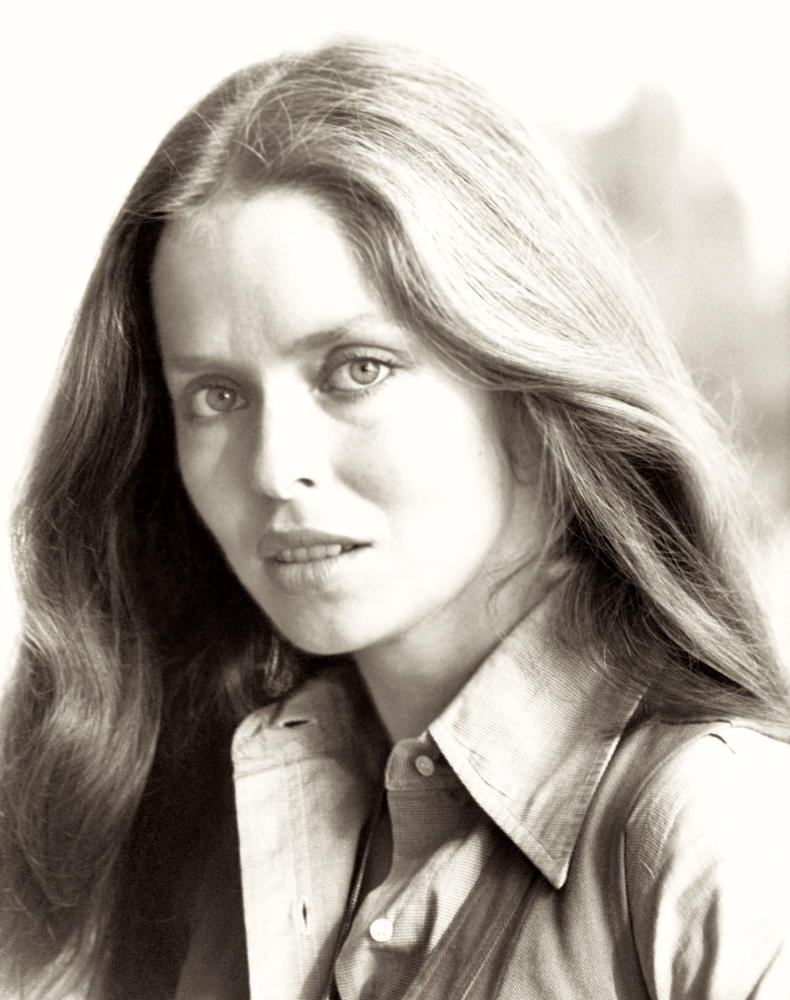
Barbara Bach

- August 3 – Colleen Corby, fashion model
- August 6 – Elaine DePrince, author and activist (died 2024)
- August 9 – John Varley, science-fiction author
- August 14 – Danielle Steel, romance novelist
- August 16 – Carol Moseley-Braun, politician
- August 19
  - Terry Hoeppner, American football coach (died 2007)
  - Gerard Schwarz, conductor
  - Gerald McRaney, actor (Major Dad)
- August 22
  - Donna Jean Godchaux, singer-songwriter
  - Cindy Williams, actress (Laverne and Shirley) (died 2023)
- August 24 – Joe Manchin, politician
- August 27
  - Harry Reems, pornographic actor (died 2013)
  - Barbara Bach, actress
- August 28 – Alice Playten, actress (died 2011)
- August 29 – Temple Grandin, animal welfare and autism expert

=== September ===
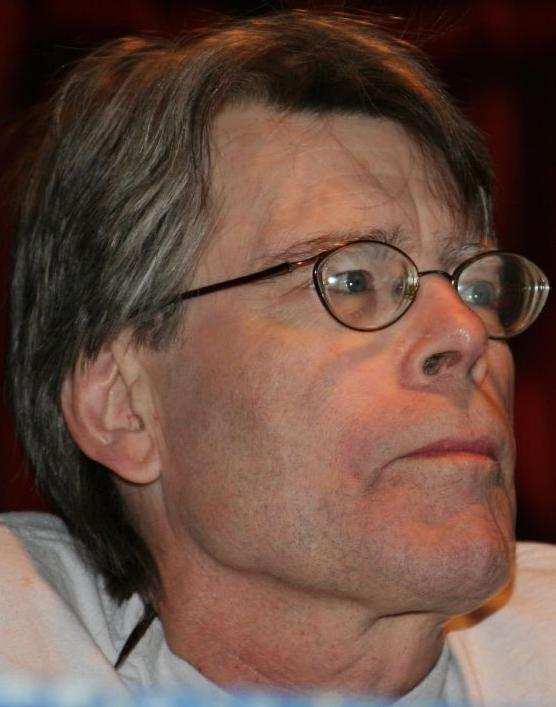
Stephen King

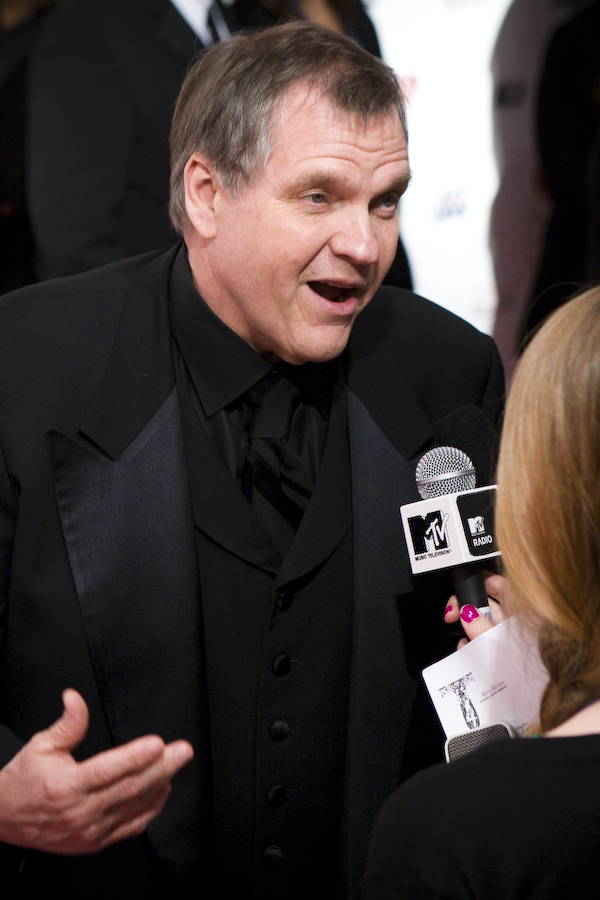
Meat Loaf

- September 1 – Al Green, politician
- September 5 – Buddy Miles, African-American drummer, singer and composer (d. 2008)
- September 6
  - Jane Curtin, actress and comedian
  - Keone Young, actor
- September 8 – Benjamin Orr, singer-songwriter (d. 2000)
- September 9 – Freddy Weller, singer-songwriter
- September 14 – William B. Taylor Jr., diplomat
- September 19 – Steve Bartlett, politician
- September 20
  - Billy Bang, violinist and composer (d. 2011)
  - Jude Deveraux, author
  - Chris Ortloff, journalist and politician
  - Bruce Pasternack, businessman (d. 2021)
- September 21
  - Don Felder, American rock guitarist
  - Stephen King, American horror novelist
- September 22 – Norma McCorvey, abortion plaintiff (Roe v. Wade) (d. 2017)
- September 23
  - Jerry Corbetta, American singer, songwriter and keyboardist (Sugarloaf) (d. 2016)
  - Mary Kay Place, American actress
- September 25
  - Jim Murphy, American author (d. 2022)
  - Cheryl Tiegs, American model, actress
  - Cecil Womack, African-American singer, songwriter (Womack & Womack) (d. 2013)
- September 26 – Lynn Anderson, American country-music singer (d. 2015)
- September 27 – Meat Loaf, American rock singer, actor (d. 2022)

=== October ===
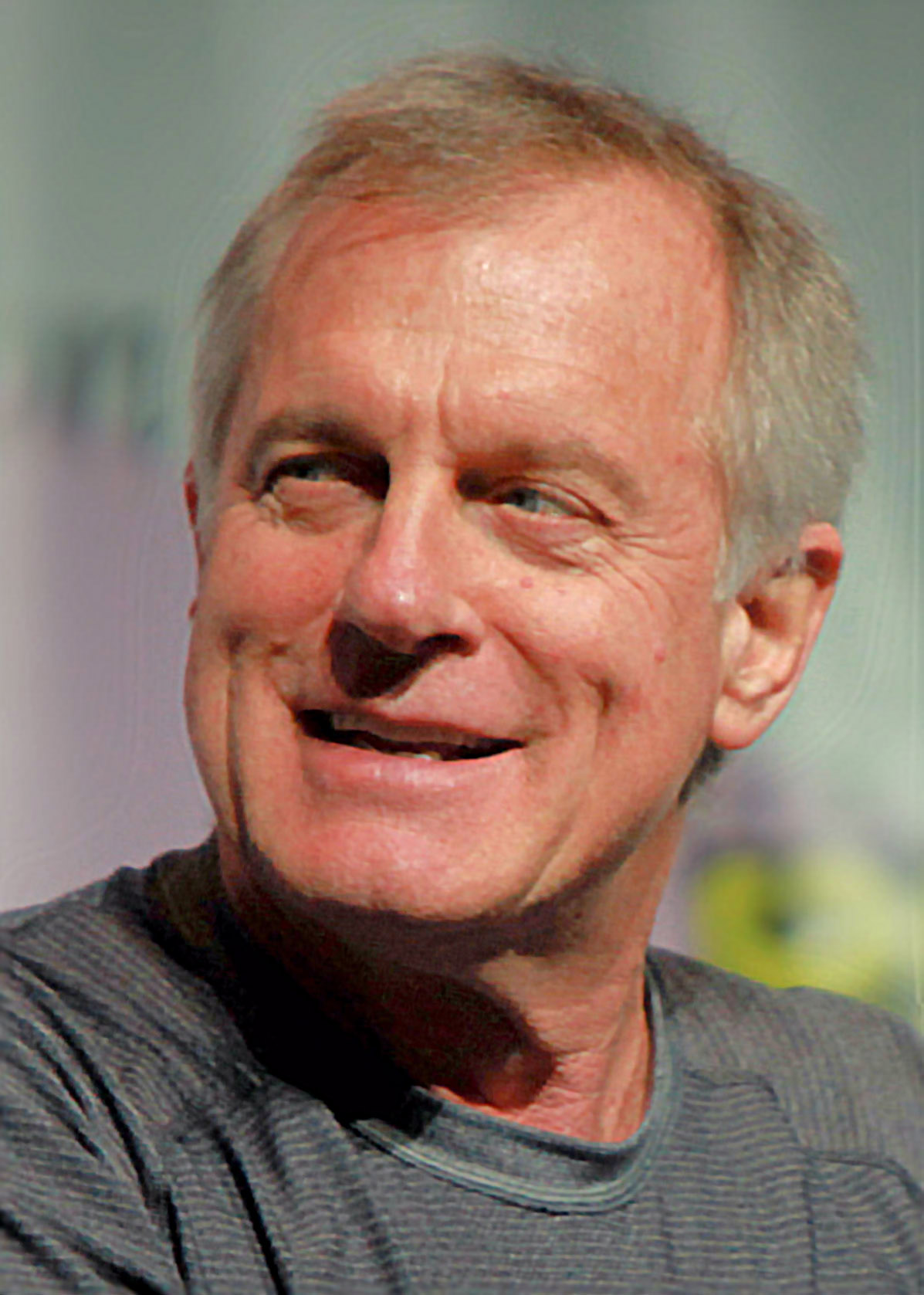
Stephen Collins

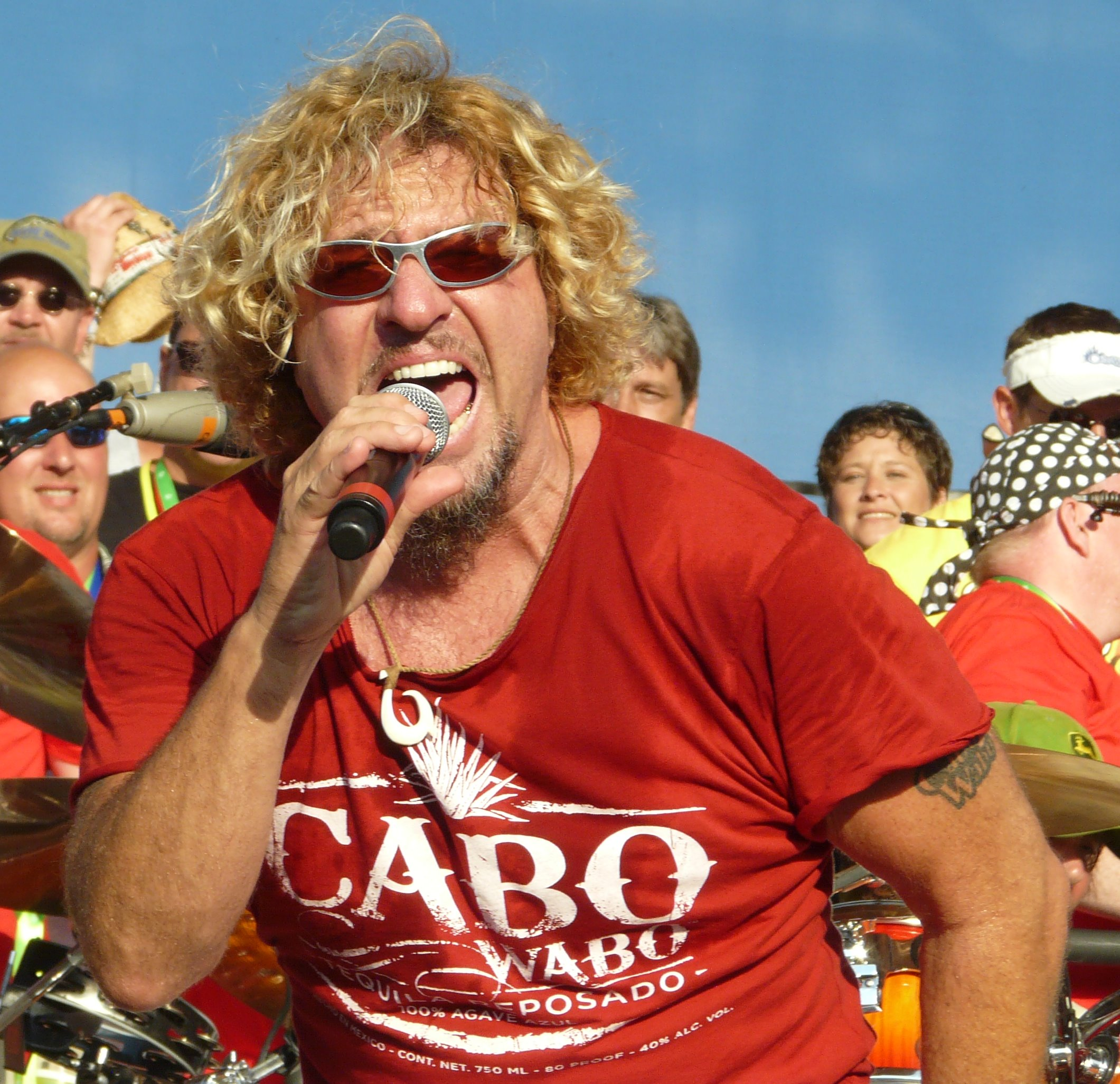
Sammy Hagar

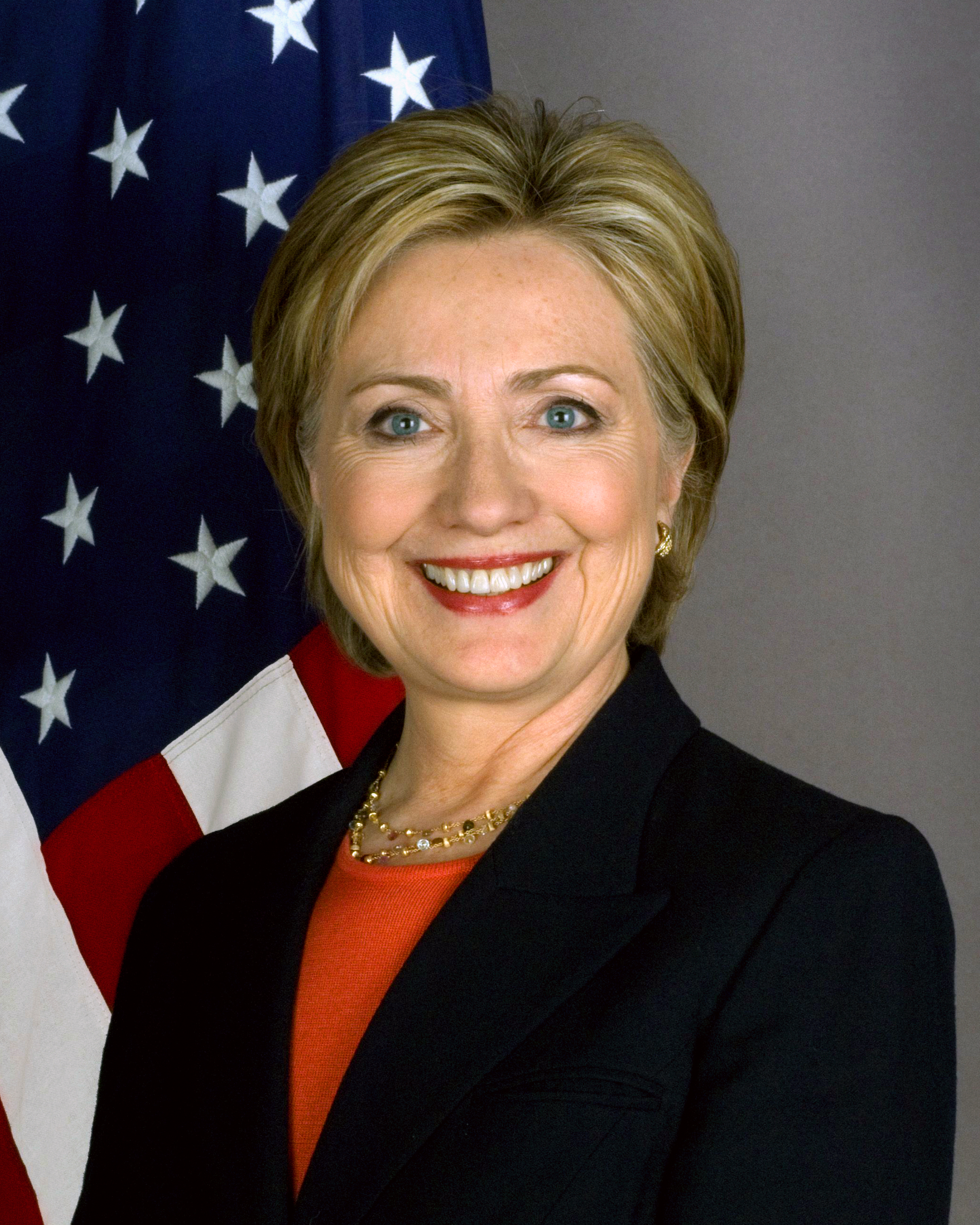
Hillary Clinton

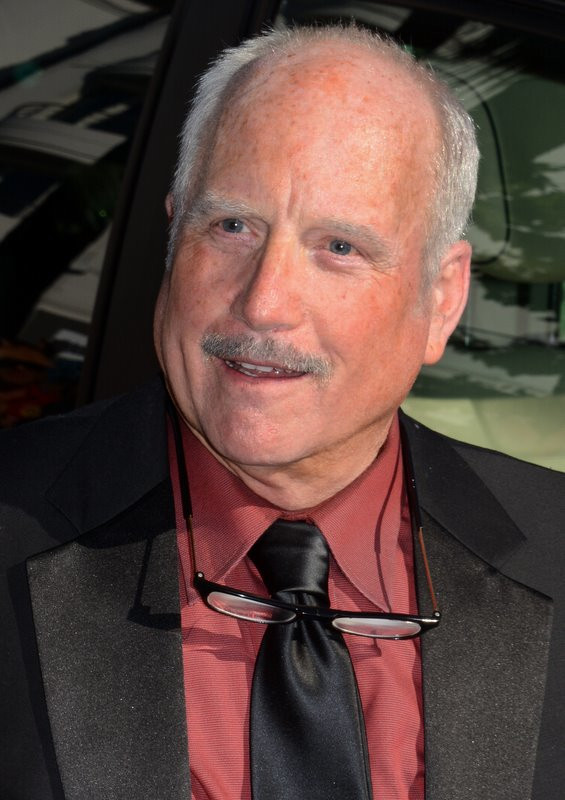
Richard Dreyfuss

- October 1 – Stephen Collins, American actor
- October 2 – Ward Churchill, American author and activist
- October 3
  - John Perry Barlow, American internet activist, writer and lyricist (d. 2018)
  - Fred DeLuca, American entrepreneur, co-founder of Subway (d. 2015)
- October 6 – Gail Farrell, American singer
- October 8 – Stephen Shore, American photographer
- October 12 – Chris Wallace, American journalist
- October 13 – Sammy Hagar, American rock musician (Van Halen)
- October 16 – Bob Weir, American rock guitarist (d. 2026)
- October 17
  - Gene Green, American politician
  - Michael McKean, American actor, comedian (Laverne and Shirley)
- October 18
  - James Robert Baker, American novelist, screenwriter (d. 1997)
  - James H. Fallon, American neuroscientist (d. 2023)
- October 23 – Frank DiLeo, American actor and music industry executive (d. 2011)
- October 24 – Kevin Kline, American actor
- October 26 – Hillary Clinton, First Lady of the United States, 67th Secretary of State
- October 27 – Terry A. Anderson, American journalist and hostage (d. 2024)
- October 29 – Richard Dreyfuss, American actor
- October 30 – Timothy B. Schmit, American musician

=== November ===
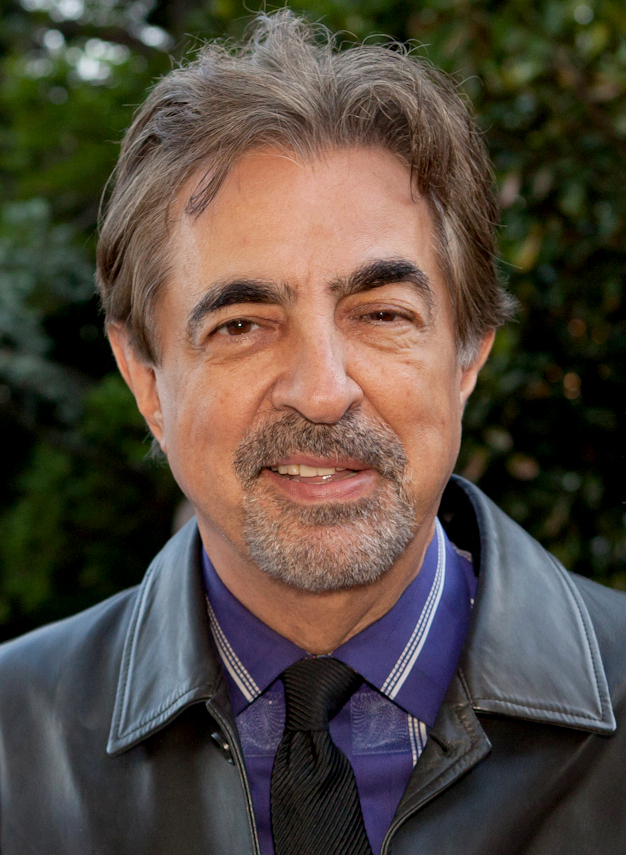
Joe Mantegna

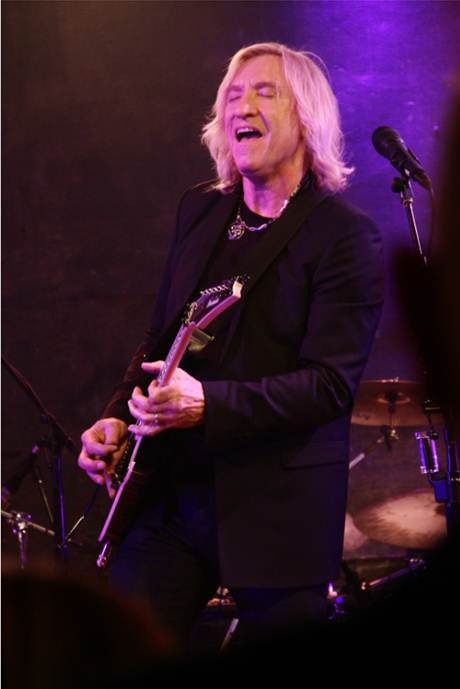
Joe Walsh

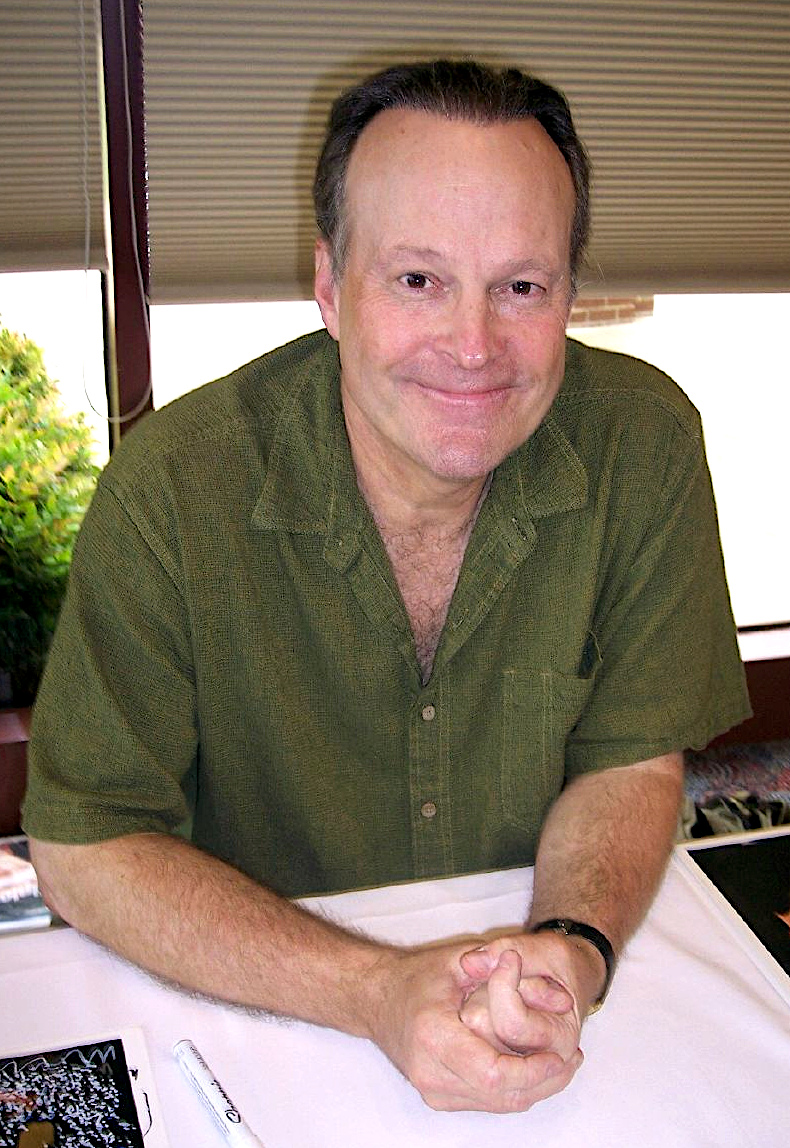
Dwight Schultz

- November 3
  - Mazie Hirono, American politician
  - Joe Lala, American musician and actor (d. 2014)
- November 5 – Robert Zimmer, American mathematician and academic administrator (d. 2023)
- November 7 – Bernhard Goetz, American shooter in 1984 subway shooting
- November 8
  - Minnie Riperton, African-American singer (d. 1979)
  - Rhea Seddon, astronaut and surgeon
  - Lewis Yocum, American orthopedic surgeon (d. 2013)
- November 9 – Phil Driscoll, American Christian musician, trumpet player
- November 10 – Glen Buxton, American rock guitarist (d. 1997)
- November 12 – Ron Bryant, American baseball player (d. 2023)
- November 13
  - Toy Caldwell, American guitarist and songwriter (The Marshall Tucker Band) (d. 1993)
  - Gene Garber, American baseball player
  - Joe Mantegna, American actor
- November 14
  - Buckwheat Zydeco, American accordionist (d. 2016)
  - P. J. O'Rourke, American journalist, satirist (d. 2022)
- November 15
  - Steven G. Kellman, American author, critic
  - Bill Richardson, American politician, governor of New Mexico and U.S. Ambassador to the United Nations (d. 2023)
- November 17 – Will Vinton, American animator, filmmaker (d. 2018)
- November 18
  - Timothy Maude, general (d. 2001)
  - Jameson Parker, actor and producer
- November 19
  - Bob Boone, American baseball player, manager
  - Lamar S. Smith, American politician
  - Ira David Wood III, American actor
- November 20 – Joe Walsh, American rock singer, songwriter and guitarist
- November 24 – Dwight Schultz, American actor (The A-Team)
- November 25 – John Larroquette, American actor (Night Court)
- November 28 – Gustav Hasford, American marine, novelist, journalist, poet and book thief (d. 1993)
- November 30
  - Jude Ciccolella, American actor
  - David Mamet, American playwright

=== December ===
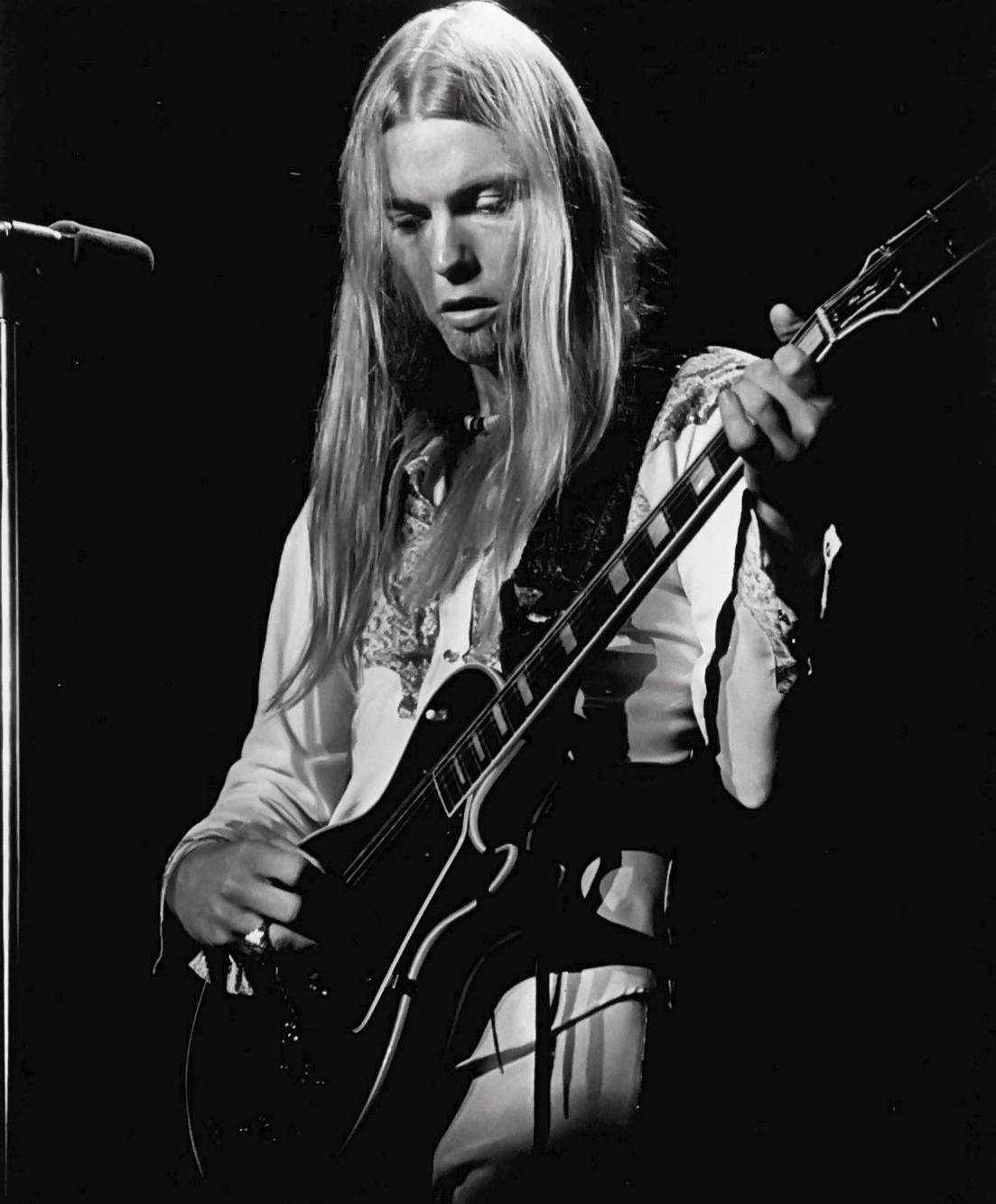
Gregg Allman

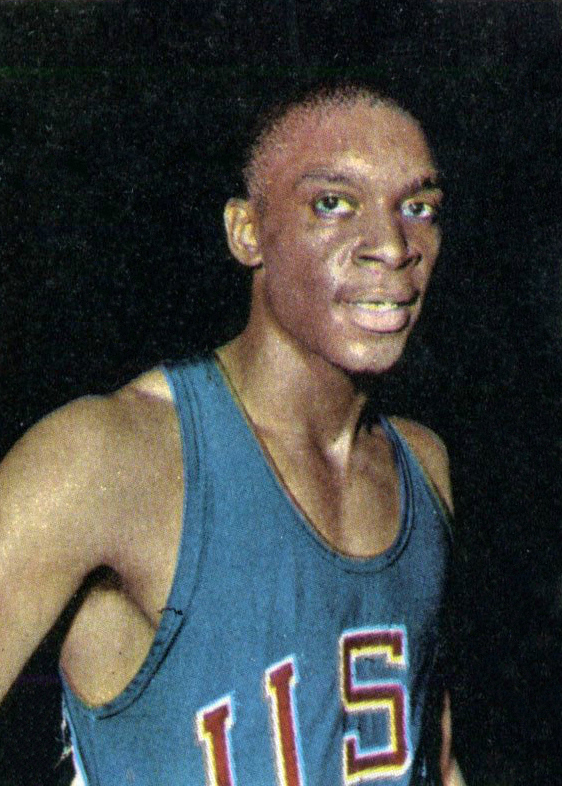
Vincent Matthews

- December 7
  - Johnny Bench, American baseball player
  - Wilton Daniel Gregory, African-American cardinal
  - Jeff Maxwell, American actor (M*A*S*H)
- December 8
  - Gregg Allman, American singer-songwriter (d. 2017)
  - Thomas R. Cech, American chemist, Nobel Prize laureate
- December 9 – Tom Daschle, American politician
- December 14
  - Valerie Bobbett Gardner, violinist, pedagogue, and author
  - Christopher Parkening, American classical guitarist
- December 16 – Vincent Matthews, African-American sprinter
- December 17
  - Marilyn Hassett, American actress
  - Wes Studi, American actor
- December 18 – Judith Heumann, American disability rights activist (d. 2023)
- December 20 – Bo Ryan, American basketball player and coach
- December 26 – Carlton Fisk, American baseball player
- December 27 – Bob Conti, American percussionist
- December 29
  - Ted Danson, American actor (Cheers)
  - Terry Manning, American recording engineer (d. 2025)
- December 31
  - Wendy Gaynor, American entrepreneur and author
  - Tim Matheson, American actor, film director and producer

=== Undated ===
- Michael Burkard, American poet and educator (d. 2024)
- John Christopher Turner, American active in Afghanistan

== Deaths ==
=== January–June ===
- January 3 – Gus Wickie, singer and voice actor (b. 1885)
- January 7 – Marie Louise Obenauer, labor laws pioneer (b. 1870)
- January 10 – Arthur E. Andersen, accountant (b. 1885)
- January 14 – Bill Hewitt, football player (Chicago Bears) and member of Pro Football Hall of Fame (b. 1909)
- January 16
  - Sonny Berman, jazz trumpeter, of suspected drug overdose (b. 1925)
  - Fate Marable, jazz pianist and bandleader, of pneumonia (b. 1890)
- January 17 – Janet Cook Lewis, portrait painter, librarian, and bookbinder (b. 1855)
- January 20
  - Andrew Volstead, politician (b. 1860)
  - Josh Gibson, African-American baseball player and member of MLB Hall of Fame (b. 1911)
- January 25 – Al Capone, gangster (b. 1899)
- January 26 – Grace Moore, operatic soprano, in plane crash (b. 1898)
- February 12
  - Kurt Lewin, German-American psychologist (b. 1890)
  - Sidney Toler, actor (b. 1874)
- February 22 – Willie Franklin Pruitt, poet and activist (b. 1865)
- March 8 – Victor Potel, character actor and comedian (b. 1889)
- March 9 – Carrie Chapman Catt, women's suffrage leader (b. 1859)
- March 12 – Winston Churchill, novelist (b. 1871)
- March 18 – William C. Durant, automobile pioneer (b. 1861)
- March 21 – Homer Lusk Collyer, one of the reclusive Collyer brothers (b. 1881)
- March 28 – Johnny Evers, baseball player (Chicago Cubs) and member of MLB Hall of Fame (b. 1881)
- April 7 – Henry Ford, automobile manufacturer (b. 1863)
- April 8 – Langley Collyer, one of the reclusive Collyer brothers (b. 1885)
- April 10 – John Ince, actor (b. 1878)
- April 14 – Herbert Spencer Jennings, zoologist (b. 1868)
- April 24 – Willa Cather, novelist (b. 1873)
- April 29 – Irving Fisher, economist (b. 1867)
- May 3 – Harry Holman, character actor (b. 1872)
- May 6 – Louise Homer, operatic contralto (b. 1871)
- May 8 – Harry Gordon Selfridge, department store magnate (b. 1858)
- May 14 – John R. Sinnock, eighth Chief Engraver of the United States Mint (b. 1888)
- May 18 – Lucile Gleason, actress (b. 1888)
- May 30 – Baron Georg von Trapp, Austrian naval officer, patriarch of the Von Trapp Family Singers (b. 1880)
- May 31 – Adrienne Ames, actress (b. 1907)
- June 9 – J. Warren Kerrigan, actor (b. 1879)
- June 11 – Richard Hönigswald, Hungarian-born philosopher (b. 1875)
- June 17 – Maxwell Perkins, literary editor (b. 1884)
- June 20 – Bugsy Siegel, gangster (b. 1906)
- June 22 – Jim Tully, vagabond, pugilist and writer (b. 1886)

=== July–December ===
- July 12 – Jimmie Lunceford, African-American jazz saxophonist and bandleader, of cardiac arrest (b. 1902)
- July 15
  - Walter Donaldson, songwriter (b. 1893)
  - Brandon Hurst, stage and screen actor (b. 1866)
- August 3 – Vic Willis, baseball player (Boston Braves) and member of MLB Hall of Fame (b. 1876)
- September 1 – Frederick Russell Burnham, father of the international Scouting movement (b. 1861)
- September 18 – Bert Kalmar, lyricist (b. 1884)
- September 20
  - Fiorello La Guardia, Mayor of New York (b. 1882)
  - Edward McCartan, sculptor (b. 1879)
- September 21 – Harry Carey, film actor (b. 1878)
- October 1
  - Olive Borden, actress (b. 1906)
  - James Gamble Rogers, architect (b. 1867)
- October 3 – Ernest L. Riebau, politician (b. 1895)
- October 17 – John Halliday, actor (b. 1880)
- October 29 – Frances Cleveland, First Lady, wife of President Grover Cleveland (b. 1864)
- November 3
  - Nelson McDowell, actor (b. 1870)
  - John Gilbert Winant, politician and diplomat, suicide (b. 1889)
- November 4 – Mabel Van Buren, actress (b. 1878)
- November 20 – Walter J. Mathews, California architect (b. 1850)
- November 28 – W. E. Lawrence, silent film actor (b. 1896)
- December 6 – Al Sack, conductor, composer and violinist (b. 1911)
- December 7 – Nicholas Murray Butler, polymath, president of Columbia University and recipient of the Nobel Peace Prize (b. 1862)
- December 22 – Edward Nelson Woodruff, politician (b. 1862)

== See also ==
- List of American films of 1947
- Timeline of United States history (1930–1949)
