= Richard Bowdry =

American racing driver

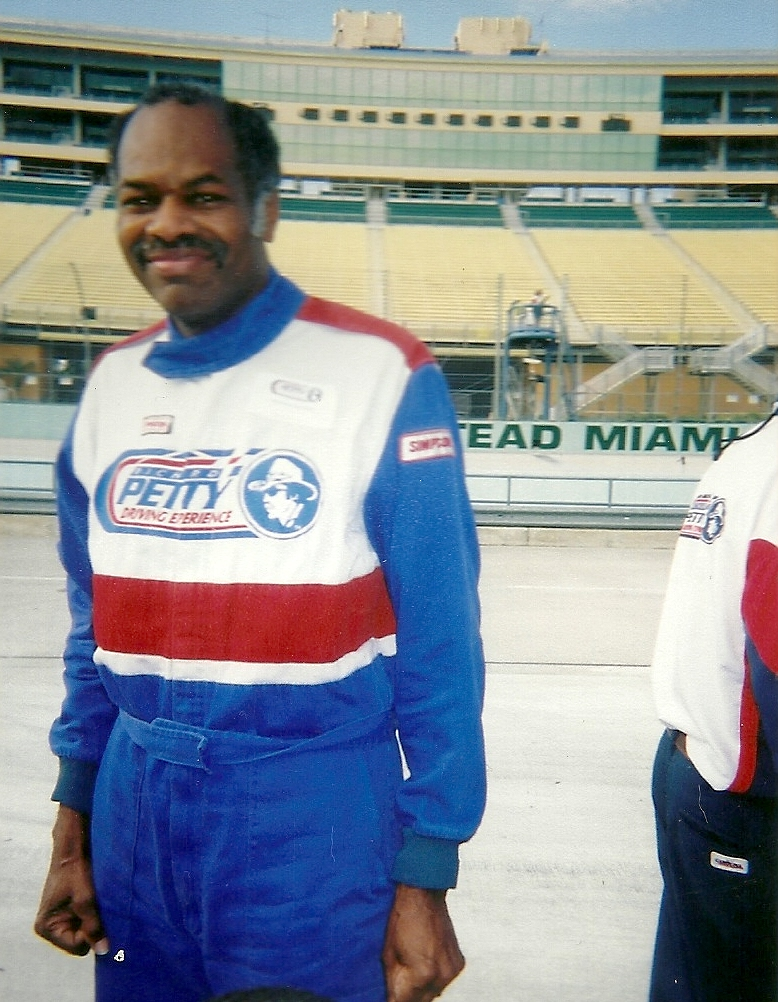
Richard Bowdry race car driver

Richard Bowdry (born April 25, 1947) is one of South Florida’s first African-American stock car drivers from the 1970s and 1980s and at the time was "probably one of only four or five blacks in the country to race stock cars regularly". While “people of color have been making considerable contributions to the sport of auto racing as far back as the early 1900s” the sport still suffers from several economic and psychological barriers to integration In an attempt to address this diversity issues, NASCAR initiated a program in 2004 called Drive for Diversity in order to attract minority fans, drivers and crew members to the sport. To date, the program’s success has been minimal, at best Nevertheless, pioneers such as Richard Bowdry, along with his mentors and comrades, have greatly helped to lead the way to diversity in a sport traditionally defined by a “certain culture: white Southerners”

== Early life ==
Bowdry was born in La Grange, Illinois, and is a graduate of the University of Michigan. He holds degrees in Electrical Engineering and Computer Science. While at the University of Michigan, Bowdry was known as a progressive leader in recruitment of minorities to the university's engineering department and served as the MEPO director from 1972-1974. In addition, he has worked on projects at NASA and has led an accomplished career at IBM as a computer programmer for over 40 years.

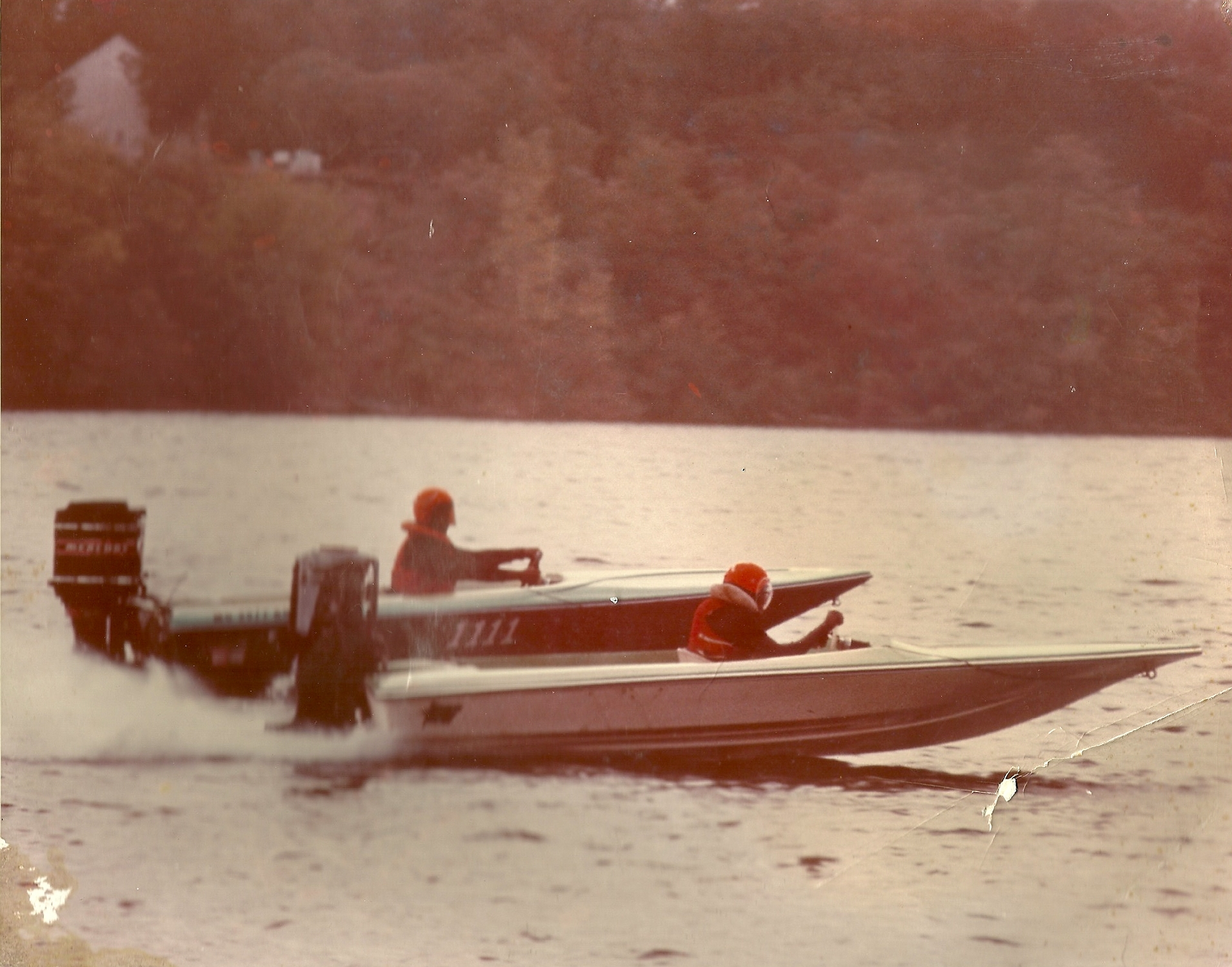
Richard Bowdry Boat Racing

While always a fan of stock car racing, Bowdry’s career started as a drag racer in Detroit, Michigan and quickly transitioned into the world of boat racing. Though he had never stepped one foot in a boat before and didn't even know how to swim, he became one of the first African-Americans to race with the World Outboard Racing Association (WORA) in Ann Arbor, MI.

== Motorsports career ==
In 1972, he moved with his family from Michigan to South Florida, leaving boat racing to pursue an interest in stock car racing.

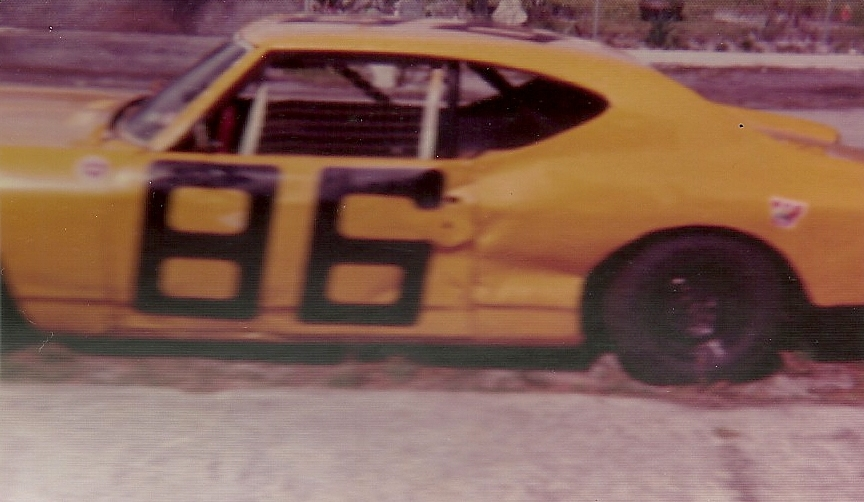
Richard Bowdry's #86 Stock Car, Thunder Class

There he connected with Bill Keitt, the first African American to race at the Palm Beach Fairgrounds Speedway Bill Keitt mentored and encouraged Bowdry and in 1976, his #86 stock car made its debut in the Thunder Car Class at the Palm Beach Fairgrounds Speedway in West Palm Beach, FL and then later at South Florida's Hialeah Speedway, an oval track which is now referred to as the "old" Hollywood Speedway.

Bowdry became a permanent fixture in the racing world and was known by many for his upbeat attitude and competitive spirit While eventually changing his trademark #86 car to the #43 car, Bowdry’s racing legacy continued in South Florida for over two decades before his retirement in 1991.
