= John Christopher Turner =

American citizen (born 1947)

John Christopher "Chris" Turner (born 1947) is an American citizen who is notable for his activities in Afghanistan.

== Biography ==
During the Soviet–Afghan War, Turner is reported to have served with the anti-Soviet Afghan Mujahideen. Turner is reported to have uploaded a YouTube video where he describes meeting Osama bin Laden, in 1984, when both men were foreign volunteers, helping to fight Afghanistan's Soviet occupiers.

Turner speaks Pashtun and wears a turban and a beard.

On October 28, 2009, while Turner was working for an Afghan trucking firm, he was staying at the Bakhtar guest house when it was attacked by a suicide attack from a band of Taliban. Turner described hearing the initial gunfire from the 6am attack, grabbing his AK-47, and waking as many of the other guests as he could, guiding them to the guest house's laundry room, and helping them escape. He said that he and a Nepalese man had held off the attackers while the guests he had roused escaped. Five guests, three attackers, and two of the guest house guards died during the attack.
