= Wendy Gaynor =

American entrepreneur and author

Wendy Gaynor (born December 31, 1947) is an entrepreneur and author based in New York City.

She began her career creating gift baskets out of her home in Sag Harbor, Long Island when she was a single mother of two daughters, Ruby and Violet. The venture led to her opening a wholesale bakery in New York City that specialized in cookies. In 1995 she had to close her business suddenly to care for her oldest daughter Ruby suffered a traumatic brain injury in a car accident.

After her daughter's recovery she and her husband Michael Davidson opened Ruby et Violette, a gourmet cookie shop in June 2001. It became renown for its extensive variety of chocolate chip cookies. Five percent of her net profits from sales of cookies went to the Mount Sinai traumatic brain injury unit, where her daughter had been treated. She sold the bakery in 2006. Soon after she began writing a memoir about helping her oldest daughter recover from a traumatic brain injury. Retelling the devastating event uncovered many of her own travails as a child, wife, mother and entrepreneur.

Mom, I Want To Speak to Marie Antoinette: A Story About Traumatic Brain Injury, Abuse, Death, Divorce, Love & Laughter was published in 2013. It was agented by Dystel and Goderich Literary Management. She became a contributing writer to The Huffington Post in October 2013.
