= National Register of Historic Places listings in Greene County, Alabama =

Location of Greene County in Alabama

This is a list of the National Register of Historic Places listings in Greene County, Alabama.

This is intended to be a complete list of the properties and districts on the National Register of Historic Places in Greene County, Alabama, United States. Latitude and longitude coordinates are provided for many National Register properties and districts; these locations may be seen together in an online map.

There are 35 properties and districts listed on the National Register in the county.

This National Park Service list is complete through NPS recent listings posted May 1, 2026.

== Current listings ==
| | Name on the Register | Image | Date listed | Location | City or town | Description |
|---|---|---|---|---|---|---|
| 1 | David Rinehart Anthony House | David Rinehart Anthony House | April 2, 1982 (#82002015) | 307 Wilson Ave. 32°50′27″N 87°53′25″W | Eutaw | Destroyed. Was located across from First Presbyterian Church. Site now occupied by a modern bank building. |
| 2 | Boligee Hill | Boligee Hill | February 19, 1982 (#82002014) | Southeast of Boligee; 32°45′35″N 87°59′20″W | Boligee | |
| 3 | Gustave Braune House | Gustave Braune House | April 2, 1982 (#82002016) | 236 Prairie Ave. 32°50′18″N 87°53′15″W | Eutaw | |
| 4 | Capt. Nathan Carpenter House | Capt. Nathan Carpenter House | July 23, 1999 (#99000793) | 2.5 miles southeast of Clinton; 32°54′05″N 87°58′12″W | Eutaw vicinity | 1852 Greek Revival plantation house. |
| 5 | Samuel W. Cockrell House | Samuel W. Cockrell House | December 6, 1982 (#82001618) | 210 Wilson Ave. 32°50′10″N 87°53′24″W | Eutaw | |
| 6 | John Coleman House | John Coleman House | December 6, 1982 (#82001617) | 1160 Mesopotamia St. 32°51′36″N 87°55′24″W | Eutaw | |
| 7 | Coleman-Banks House | Coleman-Banks House | December 18, 1970 (#70000102) | 430 Springfield Ave. 32°50′34″N 87°53′15″W | Eutaw | |
| 8 | Attoway R. Davis Home | Attoway R. Davis Home | April 2, 1982 (#82002017) | 305 Main St. 32°50′27″N 87°53′27″W | Eutaw | |
| 9 | John W. Elliott House | | April 2, 1982 (#82002018) | 244 Prairie Ave. 32°50′19″N 87°53′15″W | Eutaw | Also known as the Wilson House, built by John W. Elliott about 1850. Has been moved elsewhere since listing, site is now a parking lot. |
| 10 | First Presbyterian Church | First Presbyterian Church | December 16, 1974 (#74000411) | Main St. and Wilson Ave. 32°50′28″N 87°53′26″W | Eutaw | |
| 11 | Glenville | Glenville | April 2, 1982 (#82002019) | 200 Scears Dr. 32°50′14″N 87°54′22″W | Eutaw | |
| 12 | Rev. John H. Gray House | Rev. John H. Gray House | April 2, 1982 (#82002020) | 709 Mesopotamia St. 32°50′56″N 87°54′03″W | Eutaw | |
| 13 | Greene County Courthouse | Greene County Courthouse | March 24, 1971 (#71000098) | Courthouse Sq. 32°50′28″N 87°53′13″W | Eutaw | |
| 14 | Greene County Courthouse Square District | Greene County Courthouse Square District | December 31, 1979 (#79000385) | U.S. Route 11 and State Route 7; also nine blocks in downtown Eutaw centered around the courthouse square 32°50′25″N 87°53′17″W | Eutaw | A boundary increase was approved December 18, 2025. |
| 15 | Benjamin D. Gullett House | | April 2, 1982 (#82002021) | 317 Main St. 32°50′30″N 87°53′31″W | Eutaw | Building demolished between 1982 and 1983. |
| 16 | Stephen Fowler Hale House | Stephen Fowler Hale House | April 2, 1982 (#82002022) | 223 Wilson Ave. 32°50′16″N 87°53′27″W | Eutaw | |
| 17 | William C. Jones House | William C. Jones House | April 2, 1982 (#82002023) | 507 Mesopotamia St. 32°50′37″N 87°53′44″W | Eutaw | |
| 18 | Kirkwood | Kirkwood | May 17, 1976 (#76000327) | 111 Kirkwood Dr. 32°50′47″N 87°53′45″W | Eutaw | |
| 19 | Dr. Willis Meriwether House | Dr. Willis Meriwether House | April 2, 1982 (#82002024) | 243 Wilson Ave. 32°50′21″N 87°53′26″W | Eutaw | |
| 20 | Samuel R. Murphy House | | April 2, 1982 (#82002025) | 1150 Mesopotamia St. 32°51′49″N 87°54′50″W | Eutaw | |
| 21 | William Perkins House | William Perkins House | April 2, 1982 (#82002026) | 89 Spencer St. 32°50′18″N 87°53′21″W | Eutaw | |
| 22 | William F. Pierce House | William F. Pierce House | November 17, 1983 (#83003446) | 309 Womack Ave. 32°50′30″N 87°53′46″W | Eutaw | |
| 23 | Littleberry Pippen House | Littleberry Pippen House | April 2, 1982 (#82002027) | 431 Springfield Ave. 32°50′34″N 87°53′17″W | Eutaw | |
| 24 | Edwin Reese House | Edwin Reese House | April 2, 1982 (#82002028) | 244 Wilson Ave. 32°50′23″N 87°53′23″W | Eutaw | |
| 25 | William A. Rogers House | William A. Rogers House | April 2, 1982 (#82002029) | 1149 Mesopotamia St. 32°51′23″N 87°54′26″W | Eutaw | |
| 26 | Rosemount | Rosemount | May 27, 1971 (#71000099) | 1 mile (1.6 km) northwest of Forkland; 32°40′16″N 87°54′28″W | Forkland | |
| 27 | St. John's-In-The-Prairie | St. John's-In-The-Prairie | November 20, 1975 (#75000313) | State Route 4; 32°38′51″N 87°52′54″W | Forkland | |
| 28 | Phillip Schoppert House | Phillip Schoppert House | April 2, 1982 (#82002030) | 230 Prairie Ave. 32°50′17″N 87°53′15″W | Eutaw | |
| 29 | Thornhill | Thornhill | May 10, 1984 (#84000618) | Northwest of Forkland; 32°41′14″N 87°55′54″W | Forkland | |
| 30 | Iredell P. Vaughn House | Iredell P. Vaughn House | April 2, 1982 (#82002031) | 409 Wilson Ave. 32°50′31″N 87°53′27″W | Eutaw | |
| 31 | William Peter Webb House | William Peter Webb House | April 2, 1982 (#82002032) | 401 Main St. 32°50′30″N 87°53′33″W | Eutaw | |
| 32 | Asa White House | Asa White House | April 2, 1982 (#82002033) | 314 Mesopotamia St. 32°50′35″N 87°53′29″W | Eutaw | |
| 33 | William B. Wills House | William B. Wills House | September 22, 1983 (#83002969) | 108 Ashby Dr. 32°50′50″N 87°53′43″W | Eutaw | |
| 34 | Catlin Wilson House | Catlin Wilson House | April 2, 1982 (#82002034) | 237 Wilson Ave. 32°50′20″N 87°53′27″W | Eutaw | |
| 35 | Daniel R. Wright House | Daniel R. Wright House | April 2, 1982 (#82002035) | 501 Pickens St. 32°50′37″N 87°53′17″W | Eutaw | |

== See also ==
- Antebellum Homes in Eutaw Thematic Resource
- List of National Historic Landmarks in Alabama
- National Register of Historic Places listings in Alabama
