= Samuel R. Murphy House =

Historic house in Alabama, United States

- U.S. National Register of Historic Places
- Location within Alabama Location within the United States
- Nearest city: 1150 Mesopotamia Street; Eutaw, Alabama
- Coordinates: 32°51′49″N 87°54′50″W
- Built: 1850s
- Architectural style: Greek Revival
- MPS: Antebellum Homes in Eutaw Thematic Resource
- NRHP reference No.: 82002025
- Added to NRHP: April 2, 1982

The Samuel R. Murphy House, also known as the Winfield Scott Bird House, is a historic structure in Eutaw, Alabama, United States. The one-story Greek Revival house was built in the 1850s by Samuel R. Murphy, in part with materials salvaged from the old Mesopotamia Presbyterian Church. It was purchased by Winfield Scott Bird in 1869. The house was placed on the National Register of Historic Places as part of the Antebellum Homes in Eutaw Thematic Resource on April 2, 1982, due to its architectural significance.
