= William F. Pierce House =

Historic house in Alabama, United States

- U.S. National Register of Historic Places
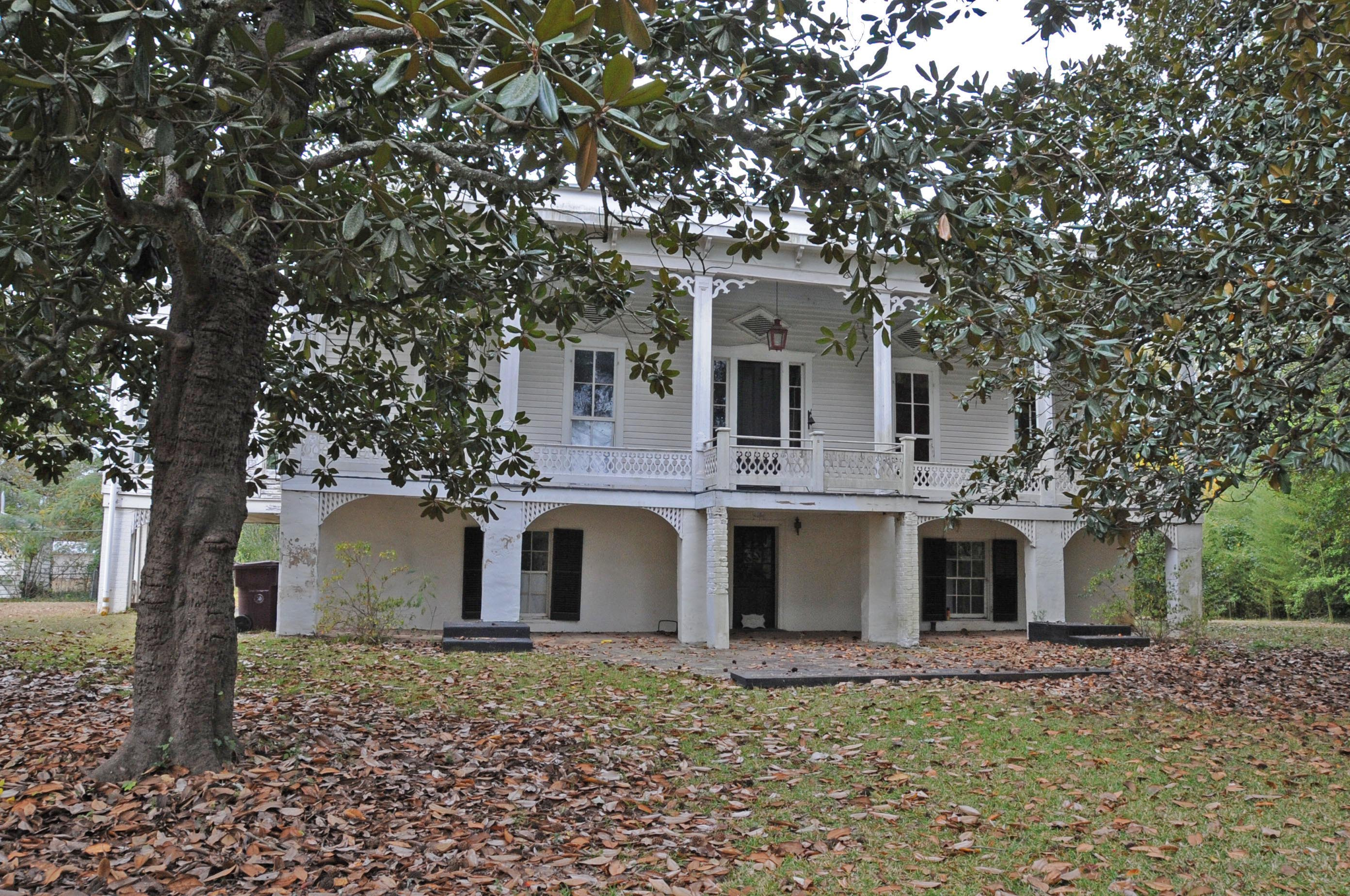

- Location within Alabama Location within the United States
- Location: 309 Womack Avenue; Eutaw, Alabama
- Coordinates: 32°50′29″N 87°53′46″W
- Built: 1840
- Architectural style: Raised Cottage
- NRHP reference No.: 83003446
- Added to NRHP: November 17, 1983

The William F. Pierce House, also known as Merifield, is a historic house in Eutaw, Alabama, United States. The house was built by William F. Pierce in 1840. Pierce purchased the lot for his house from Asa White on May 25, 1839, for $750. The main living floor is frame, built above a raised basement of brick. Both levels contain four rooms each. The main floor has a large central hall. It was added to the National Register of Historic Places on November 17, 1983, due to its architectural significance.
