= Freemount =

Freemount may refer to:

- Freemount, County Cork, a village in County Cork, Ireland
- Freemount GAA, a Gaelic Athletic Association club based in Freemount village, County Cork, Ireland
- William Perkins House, also known as Freemount, a historic house in Alabama, United States

== See also ==
- Fremont (disambiguation)
