= Rev. John H. Gray House =

Historic house in Alabama, United States

- U.S. National Register of Historic Places
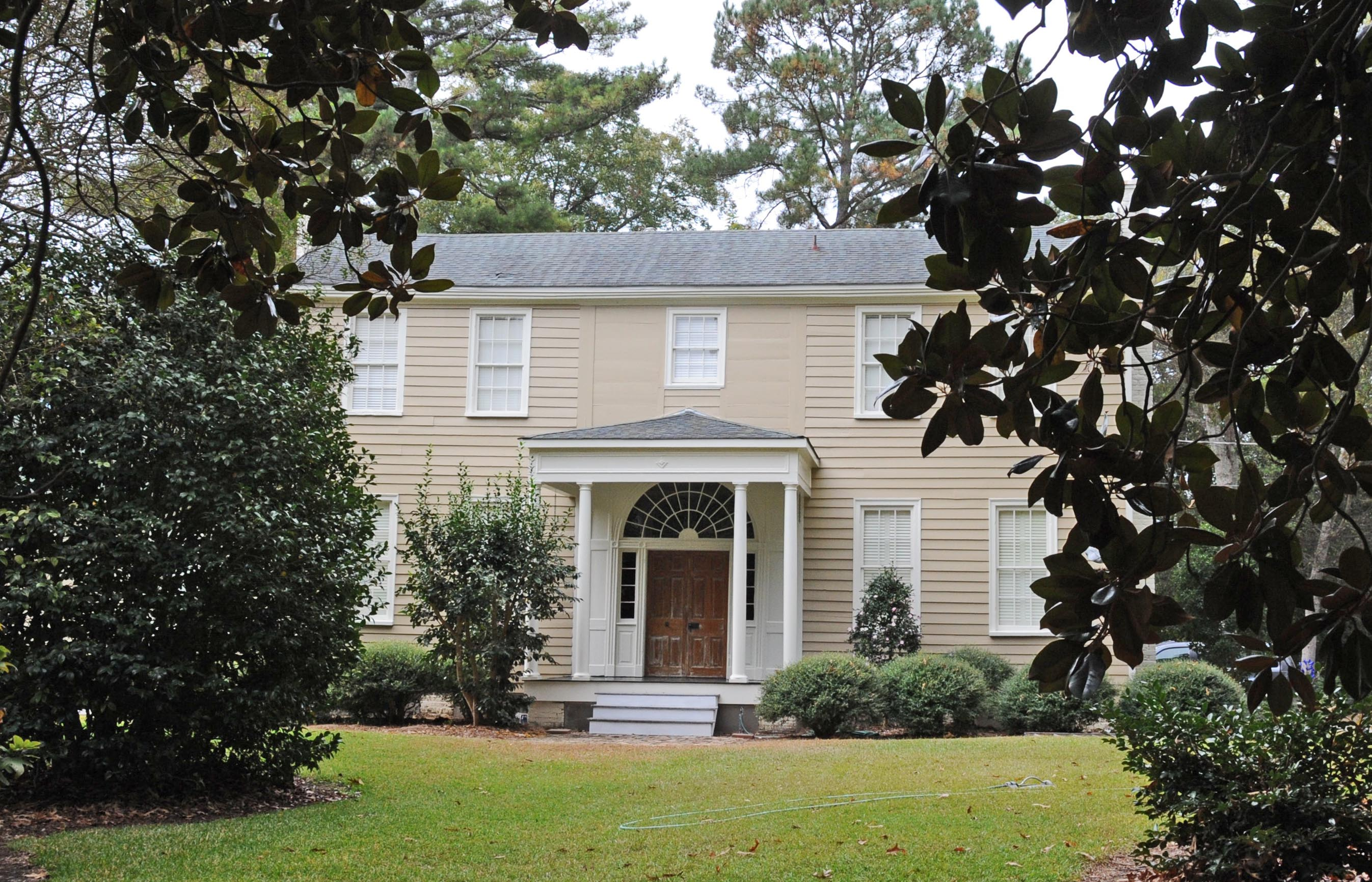

- Location within Alabama Location within the United States
- Nearest city: Eutaw, Alabama, United States
- Coordinates: 32°50′53″N 87°53′59″W
- Built: 1830s
- Architectural style: I-house type
- MPS: Antebellum Homes in Eutaw Thematic Resource
- NRHP reference No.: 82002020
- Added to NRHP: April 2, 1982

The Rev. John H. Gray House is a historic house in Eutaw, Alabama, United States. The two-story frame I-house was built by John H. Gray in the 1830s. Gray served as the first minister for the First Presbyterian Church from 1826 until 1836. The house was placed on the National Register of Historic Places as part of the Antebellum Homes in Eutaw Thematic Resource on April 2, 1982, due to its architectural significance.
