= William A. Rogers House =

Historic house in Alabama, United States

- U.S. National Register of Historic Places
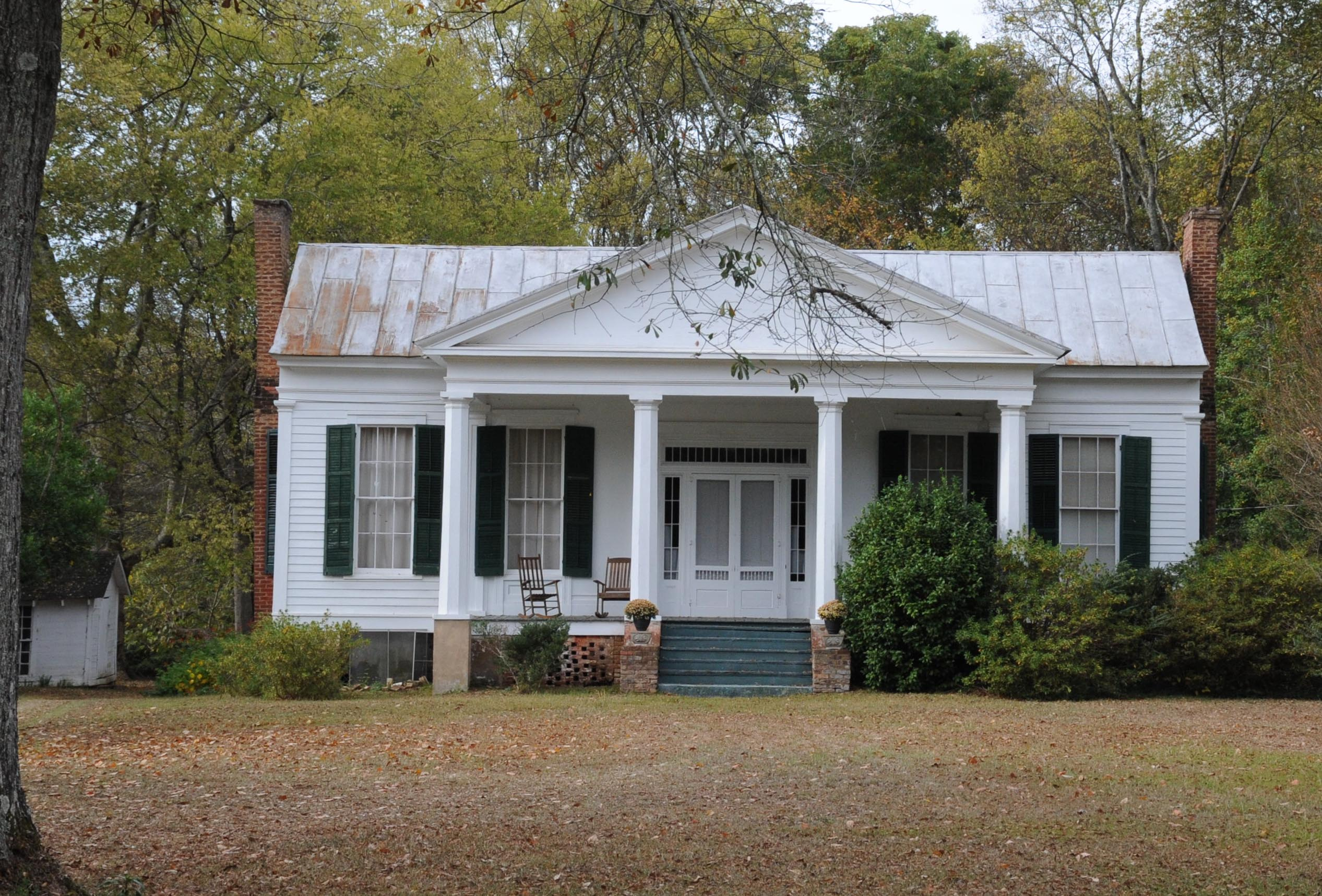

- Location within Alabama Location within the United States
- Nearest city: Eutaw, Alabama
- Coordinates: 32°51′23″N 87°54′26″W
- Area: 11 acres (4.5 ha)
- Architectural style: Greek Revival
- MPS: Antebellum Homes in Eutaw TR
- NRHP reference No.: 82002029
- Added to NRHP: April 2, 1982

The William A. Rogers House is a historic house in Eutaw, Alabama, United States. The one-story wood-frame house was built in stages from the late 1840s to the 1850s. It features Greek Revival-style architecture, with a pedimented tetrastyle portico fronting the central three bays of the five-bay main facade. It was added to the National Register of Historic Places as part of the Antebellum Homes in Eutaw Thematic Resource on April 2, 1982.
