= Phillip Schoppert House =

Historic house in Alabama, United States

- U.S. National Register of Historic Places
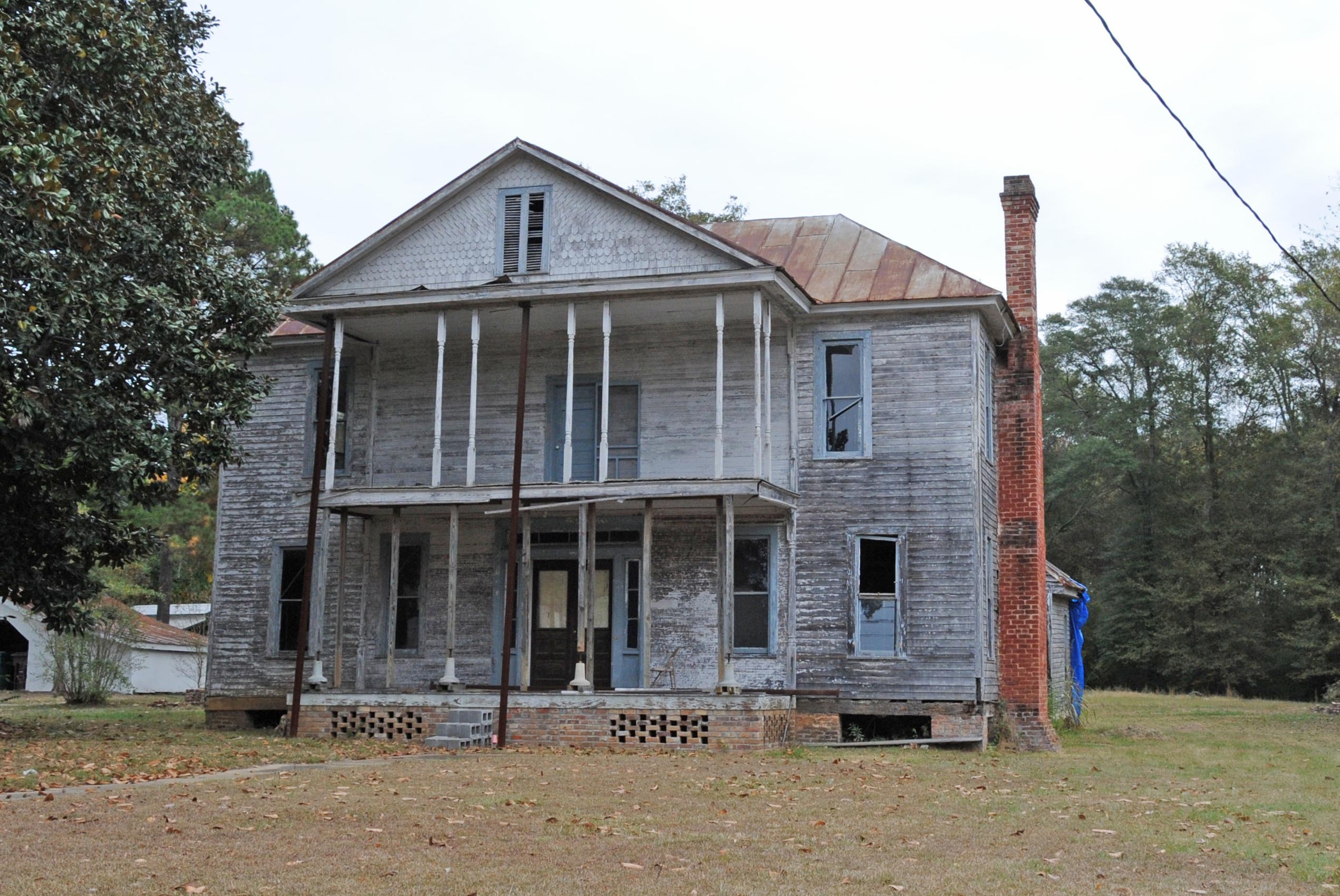

- Location within Alabama Location within the United States
- Location: 230 Prairie St., Eutaw, Alabama
- Coordinates: 32°50′13″N 87°53′5″W
- Area: 1.5 acres (0.61 ha)
- Built: 1856
- Architectural style: I-house
- MPS: Antebellum Homes in Eutaw TR
- NRHP reference No.: 82002030
- Added to NRHP: April 2, 1982

The Phillip Schoppert House is a historic house in Eutaw, Alabama, United States. The two-story wood-frame house was built c. 1856. It is an I-house with rear shed rooms and a hipped roof. A two-tiered pedimented portico fronts the central three bays of the five-bay main facade. It was added to the National Register of Historic Places as part of the Antebellum Homes in Eutaw Thematic Resource on April 2, 1982.

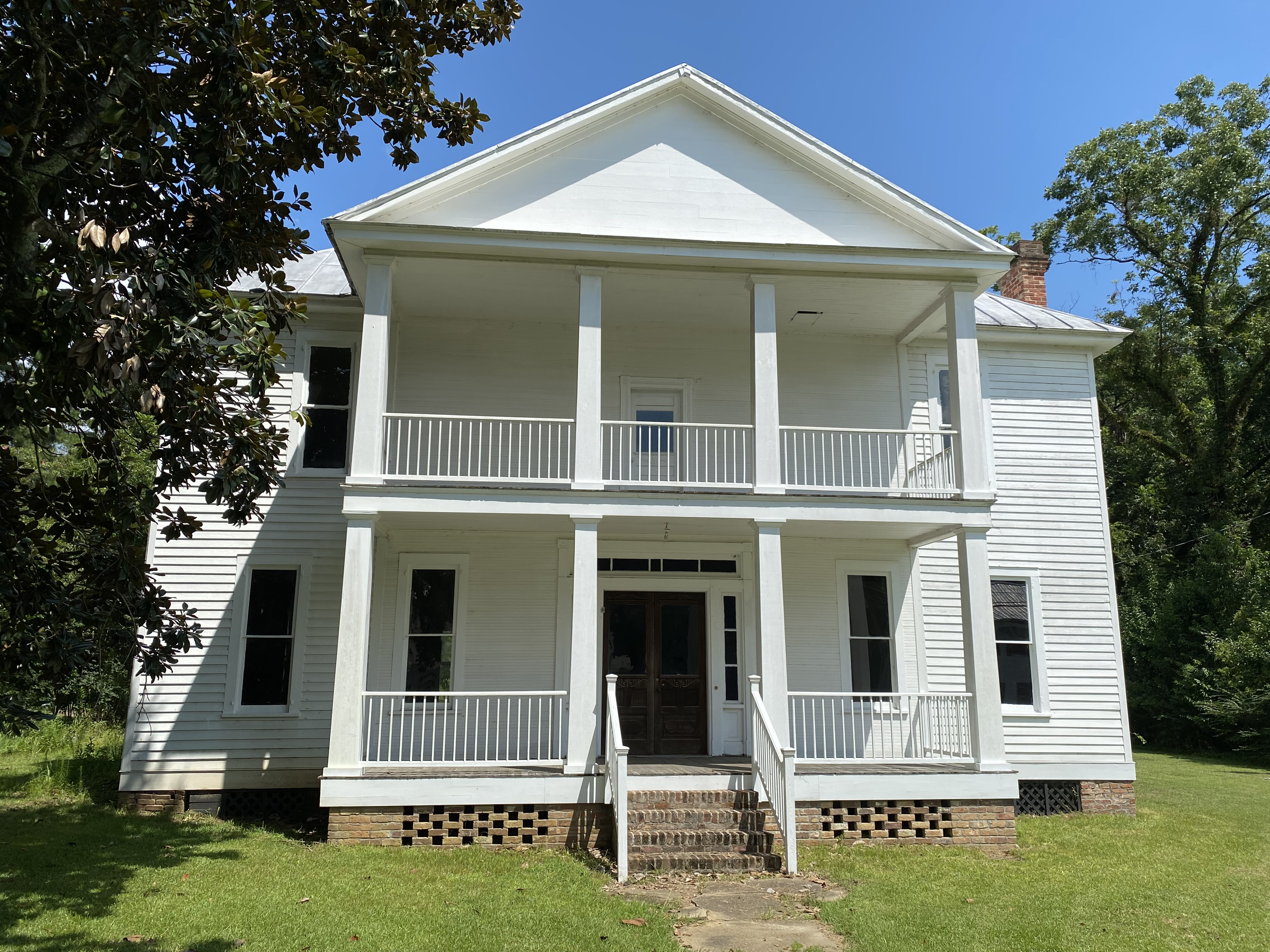
The Phillip Schoppert House in 2021
