= Dr. Willis Meriwether House =

Historic house in Alabama, United States

- U.S. National Register of Historic Places
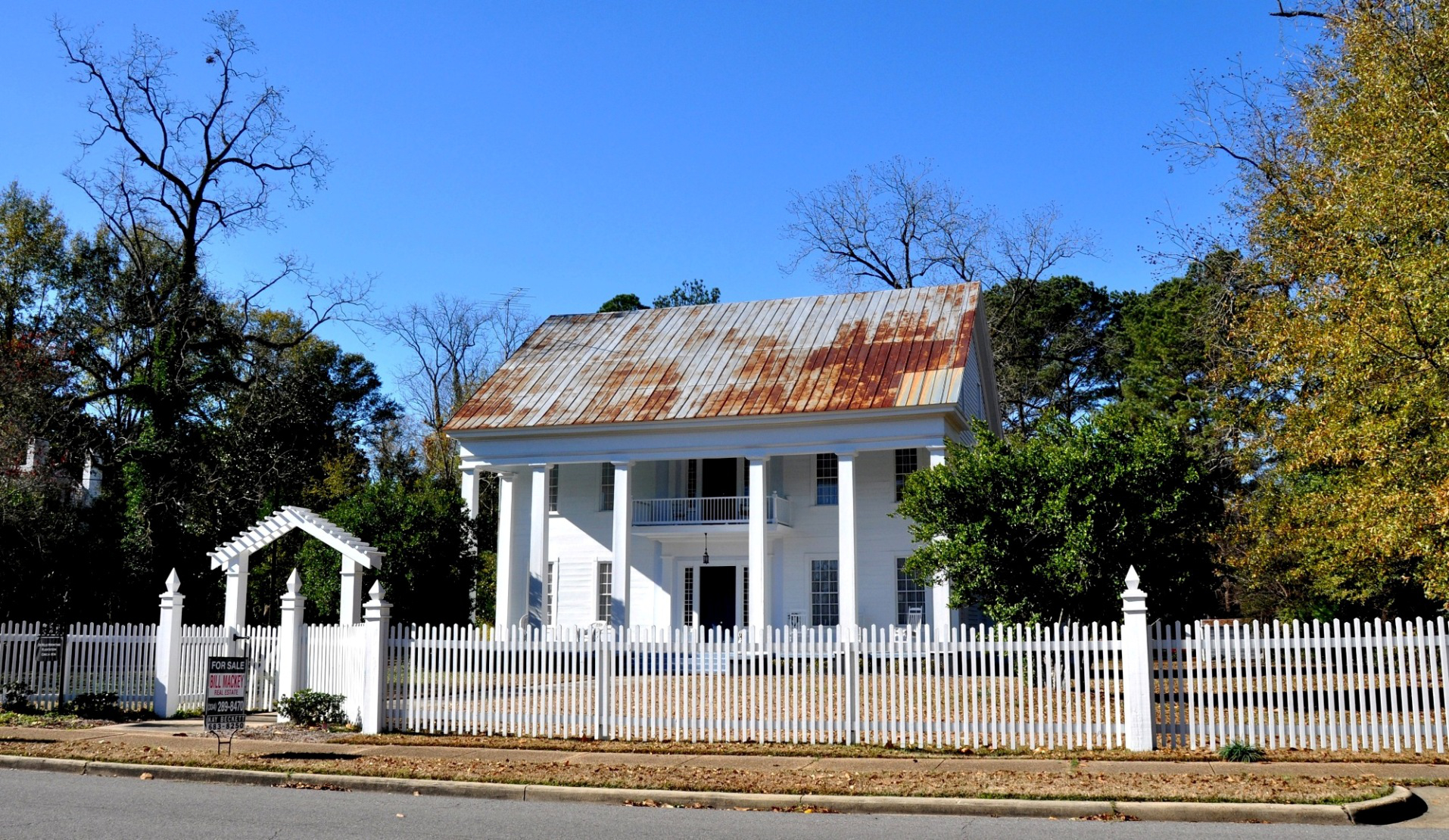

- Location within Alabama Location within the United States
- Location: 243 Wilson Avenue; Eutaw, Alabama
- Coordinates: 32°50′19″N 87°53′17″W
- Built: 1836
- Architectural style: Greek Revival
- MPS: Antebellum Homes in Eutaw Thematic Resource
- NRHP reference No.: 82002024
- Added to NRHP: April 2, 1982

The Dr. Willis Meriwether House, also known as the Clark-Malone House, is a historic vernacular Greek Revival style house in Eutaw, Alabama, United States. The house is a two-story wood-framed building on a brick foundation, six square box columns span the front portico. It was built in 1856 by Dr. Willis Meriwether. The house was recorded by the Historic American Buildings Survey in 1934. It was added to the National Register of Historic Places as a part of the Antebellum Homes in Eutaw Thematic Resource on April 2, 1982, due to its architectural significance.
