= Stephen Fowler Hale House =

Historic house in Alabama, United States

- U.S. National Register of Historic Places
- Alabama Register of Landmarks and Heritage
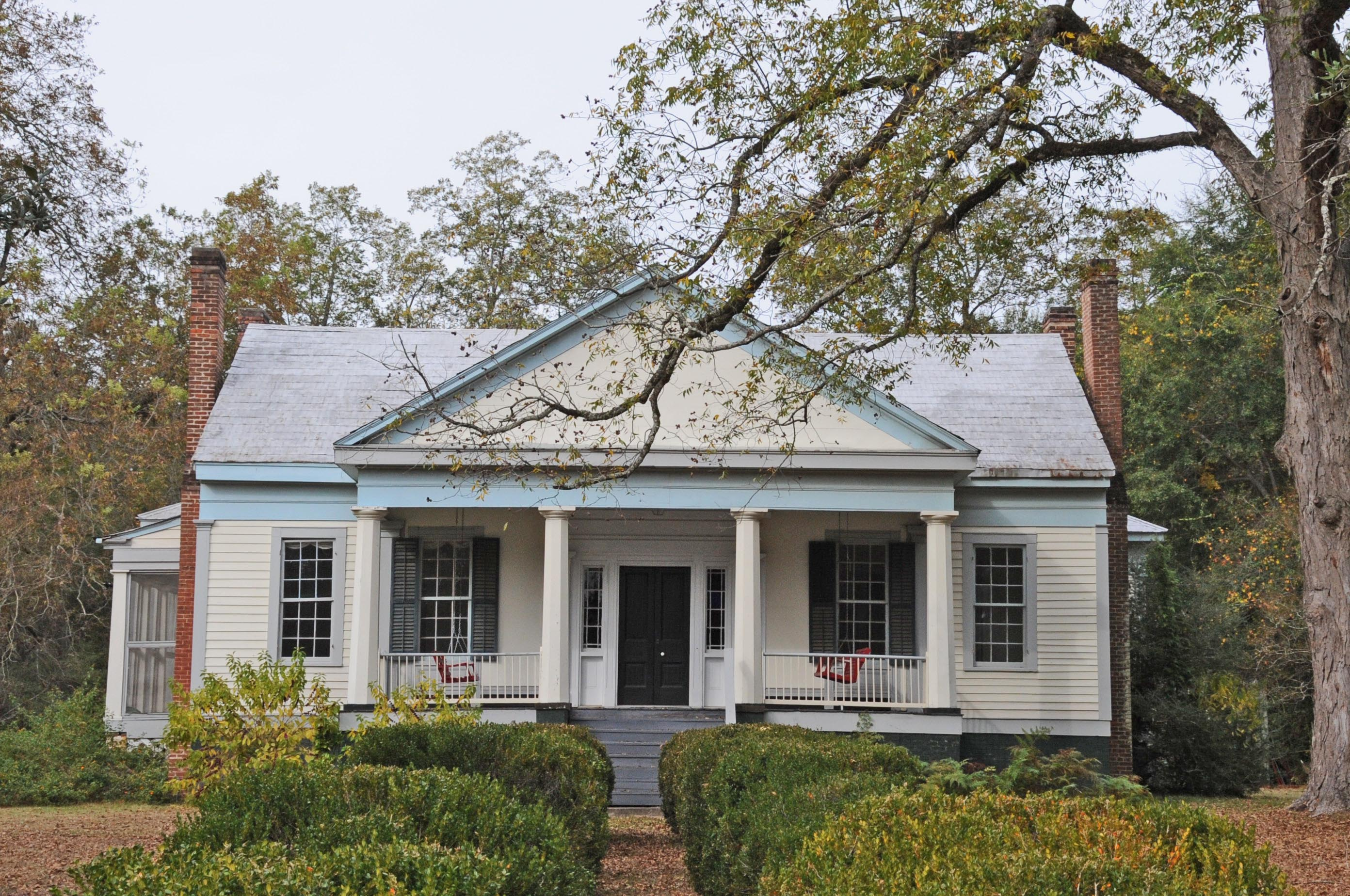

- Location within Alabama Location within the United States
- Location: 223 Wilson Street; Eutaw, Alabama
- Coordinates: 32°50′16″N 87°53′27″W
- Built: 1842
- MPS: Antebellum Homes in Eutaw Thematic Resource
- NRHP reference No.: 82002022

Significant dates
- Added to NRHP: April 2, 1982
- Designated ARLH: November 30, 1977

The Stephen Fowler Hale House, also known as the Hale-Jarvis-Trotter House, is a historic structure in Eutaw, Alabama, United States. The house was added to the Alabama Register of Landmarks and Heritage on November 30, 1977, and subsequently placed on the National Register of Historic Places on April 2, 1982, due to its architectural significance. It is a part of the Antebellum Homes in Eutaw Thematic Resource.
