= Edwin Reese House =

Historic house in Alabama, United States

- U.S. National Register of Historic Places
- Alabama Register of Landmarks and Heritage
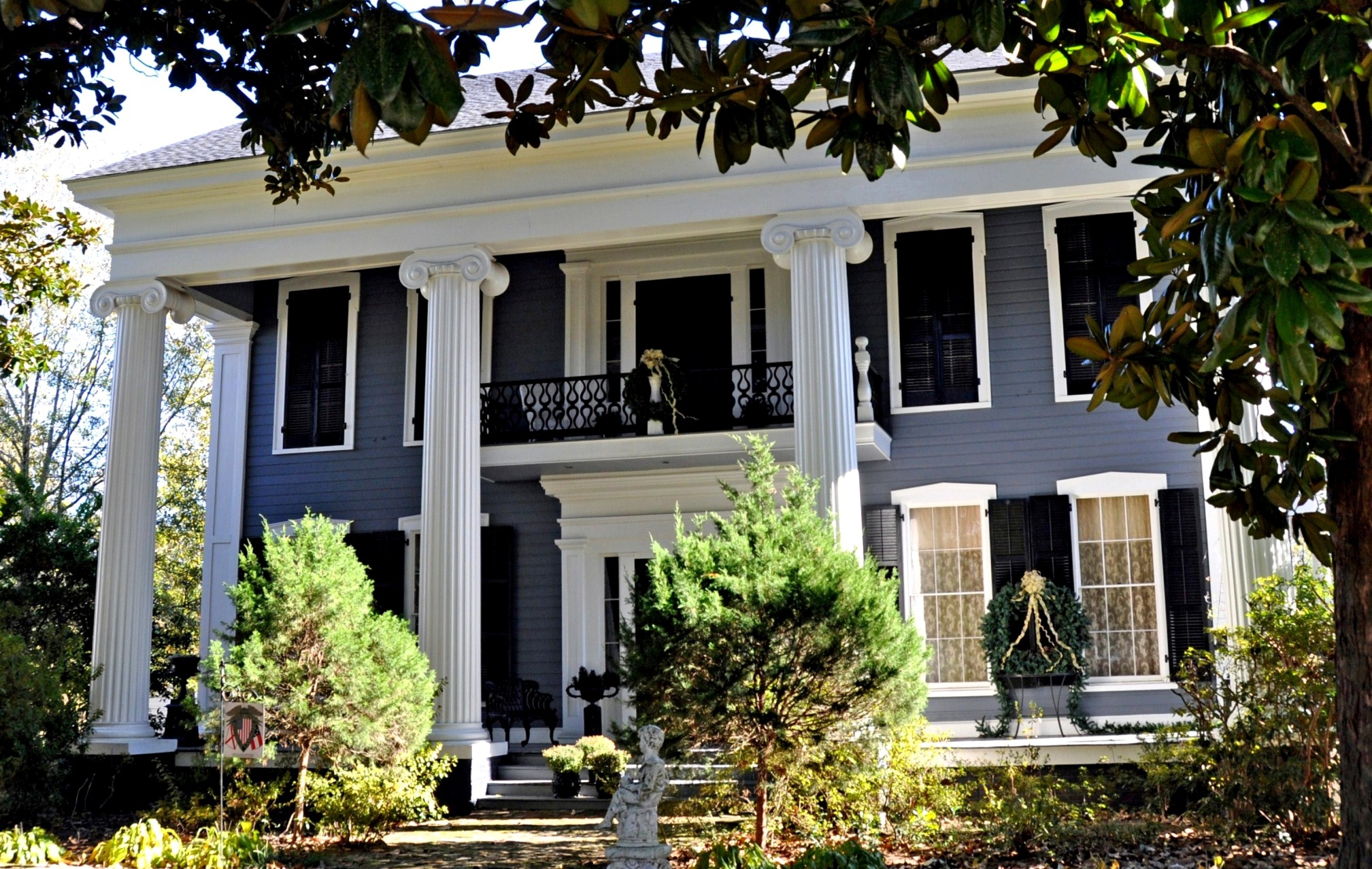

- Location within Alabama Location within the United States
- Location: 244 Wilson Avenue; Eutaw, Alabama
- Coordinates: 32°50′23″N 87°53′23″W
- Built: 1856-59
- Architectural style: Greek Revival
- MPS: Antebellum Homes in Eutaw Thematic Resource
- NRHP reference No.: 82002028

Significant dates
- Added to NRHP: April 2, 1982
- Designated ARLH: October 17, 1980

The Edwin Reese House, also known as the Reese-Phillips House, is a historic Greek Revival style house in Eutaw, Alabama, United States. The house is a two-story wood-frame building on a raised brick foundation. Four monumental Ionic columns span the front portico. It was built from 1856 to 1859 by Edwin Reese. The house was recorded by the Historic American Buildings Survey in 1936. It was listed on the Alabama Register of Landmarks and Heritage on October 17, 1980. It was added to the National Register of Historic Places as a part of the Antebellum Homes in Eutaw Thematic Resource on April 2, 1982, due to its architectural significance.
