= Iredell P. Vaughn House =

Historic house in Alabama, United States

- U.S. National Register of Historic Places
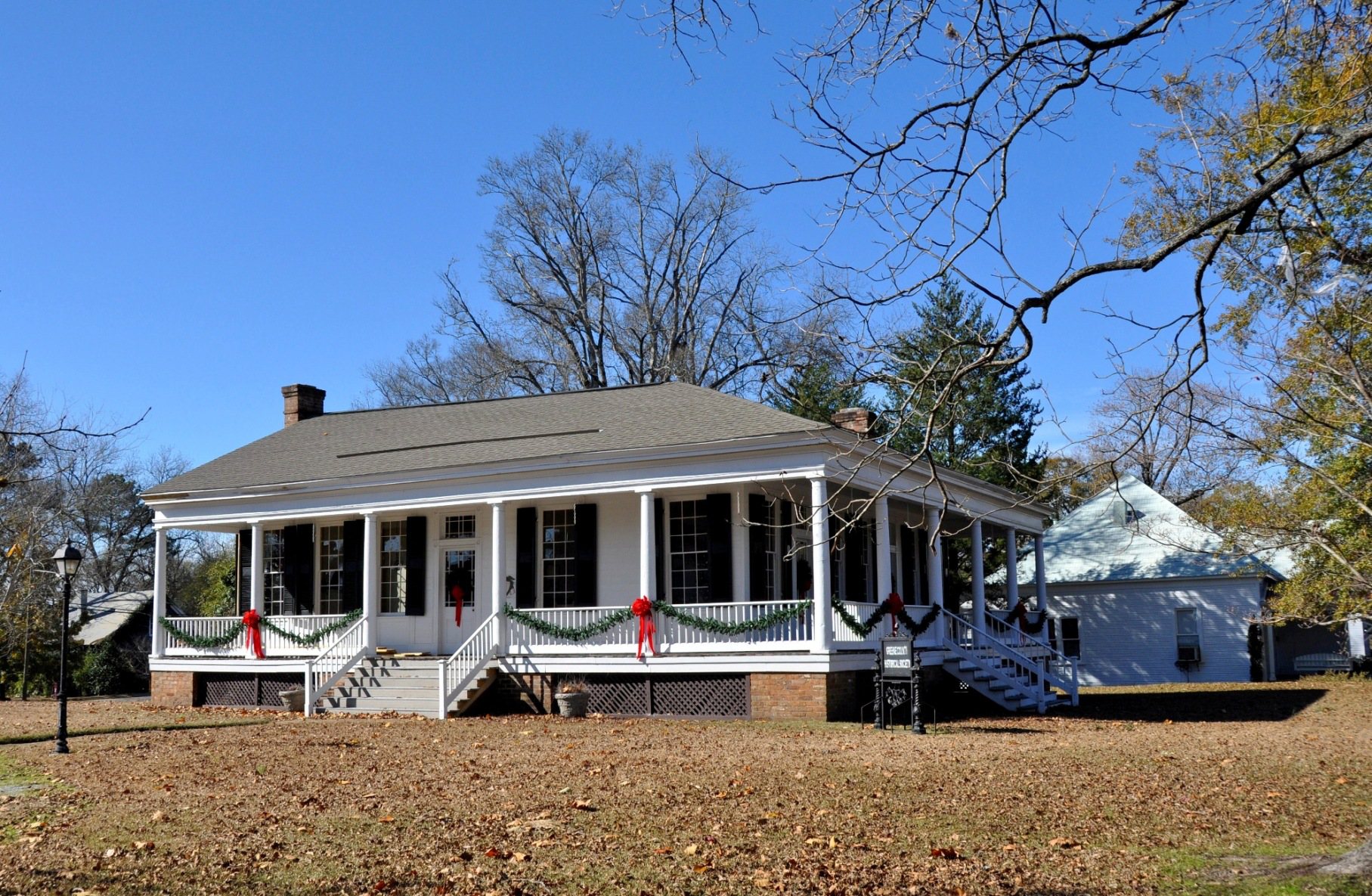

- Location within Alabama Location within the United States
- Location: 409 Wilson St., Eutaw, Alabama
- Coordinates: 32°50′23″N 87°53′17″W
- Area: less than one acre
- Built: 1841
- Architectural style: Creole cottage
- MPS: Antebellum Homes in Eutaw TR
- NRHP reference No.: 82002031
- Added to NRHP: April 2, 1982

The Iredell P. Vaughn House, also known as the Vaughn-Morrow House, is a historic house in Eutaw, Alabama, United States. The one-story wood-frame house was built c. 1841. It generally conforms to the Creole cottage-type house plan, with neoclassical stylistic elements. A one-story porch spans the full width of the east and south facades. It was added to the National Register of Historic Places as part of the Antebellum Homes in Eutaw Thematic Resource on April 2, 1982. It currently serves as the headquarters of the Greene County Historical Society.
