= William C. Jones House =

Historic house in Alabama, United States

- U.S. National Register of Historic Places
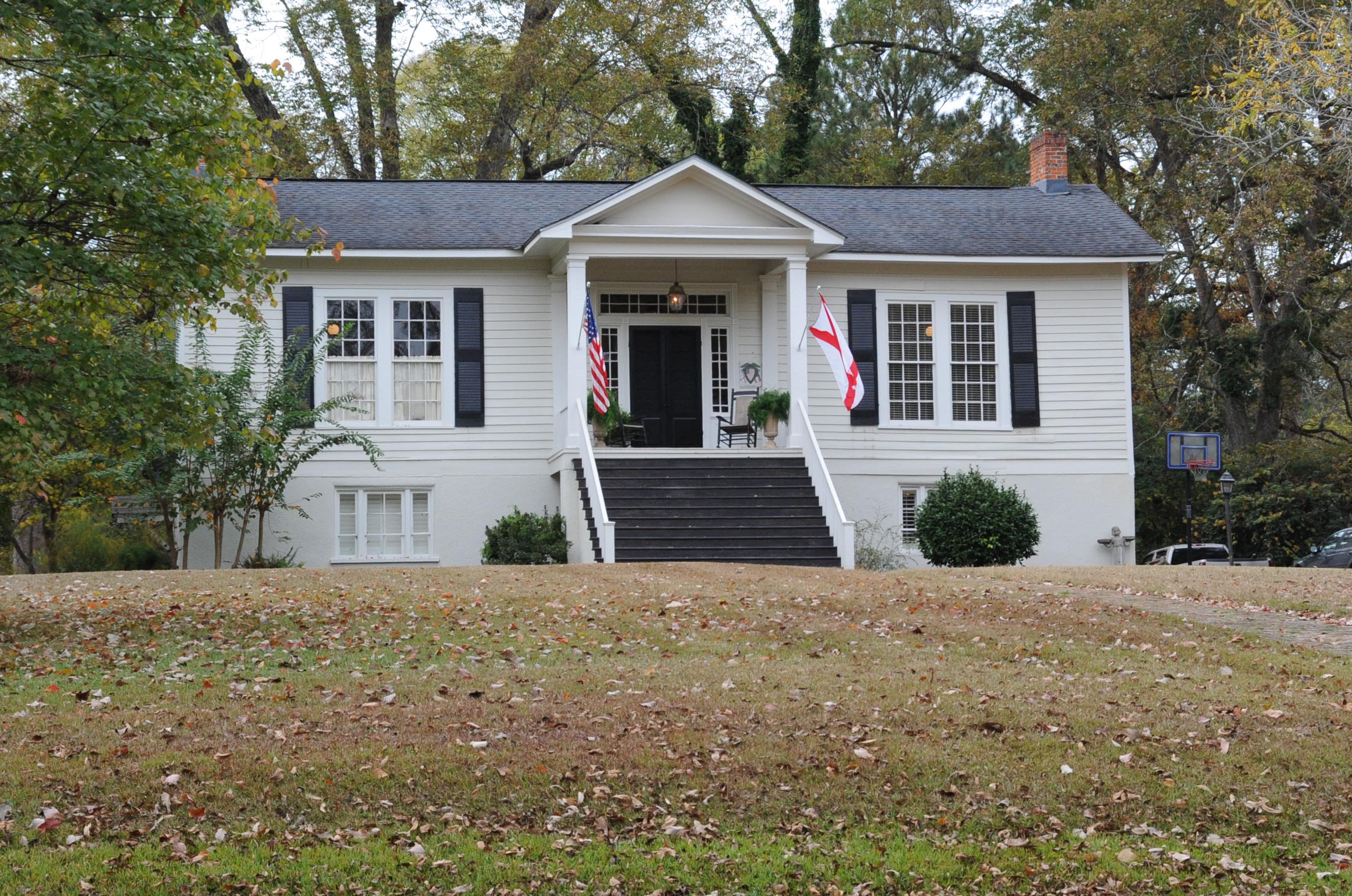

- Location within Alabama Location within the United States
- Location: 507 Mesopotamia Street; Eutaw, Alabama
- Coordinates: 32°50′35″N 87°53′37″W
- Built: 1840s
- MPS: Antebellum Homes in Eutaw Thematic Resource
- NRHP reference No.: 82002023
- Added to NRHP: April 2, 1982

The William C. Jones House, also known as the Archibald-Tuck House, is a historic structure in Eutaw, Alabama, United States. The house was placed on the National Register of Historic Places as part of the Antebellum Homes in Eutaw Thematic Resource on April 2, 1982, due to its architectural significance.
