= Littleberry Pippen House =

Historic house in Alabama, United States

- U.S. National Register of Historic Places
- Alabama Register of Landmarks and Heritage
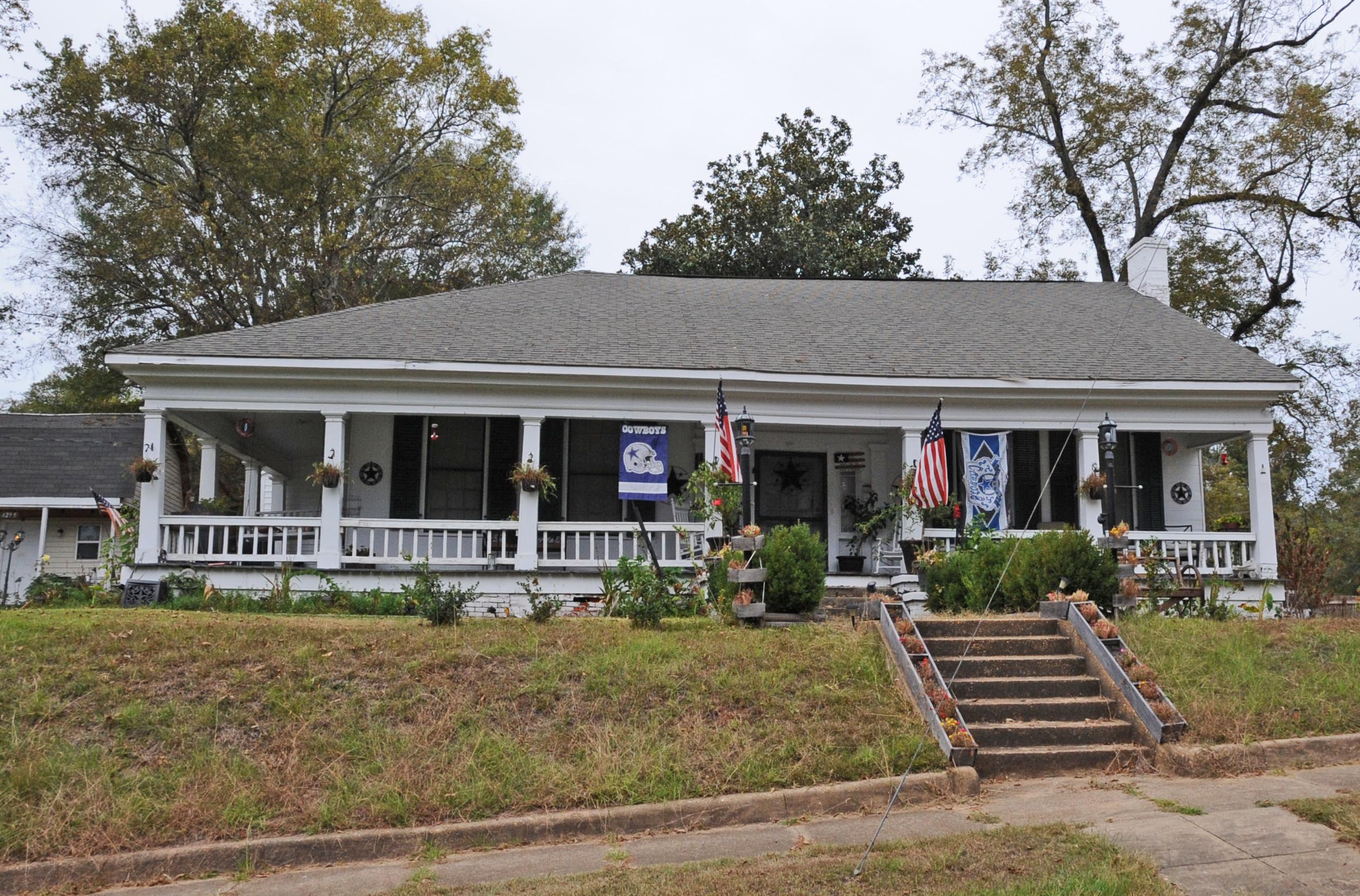

- Location within Alabama Location within the United States
- Location: 431 Springfield St., Eutaw, Alabama
- Coordinates: 32°50′31″N 87°53′9″W
- Area: 1.9 acres (0.77 ha)
- Architectural style: Greek Revival, Creole cottage
- MPS: Antebellum Homes in Eutaw TR
- NRHP reference No.: 82002027

Significant dates
- Added to NRHP: April 2, 1982
- Designated ARLH: October 11, 1978

The Littleberry Pippen House is a historic house in Eutaw, Alabama, United States. The one-story wood-frame house was built in the early 1840s. It features Greek Revival-style architecture, with inspiration drawn from Creole cottage forms. It was added to the National Register of Historic Places as part of the Antebellum Homes in Eutaw Thematic Resource on April 2, 1982.
