= Benjamin F. Alexander =

American politician

Alabama House of Representatives
- In office 1868–1870

Benjamin F. Alexander was an American politician. He was a delegate to Alabama's 1867 Constitutional Convention and a state representative for Greene County, Alabama during the Reconstruction era. He lived in Eutaw.

A farmer, he was born in North Carolina in 1820.

== See also ==
- List of African-American officeholders during Reconstruction
