= Antebellum Homes in Eutaw Thematic Resource =

Twenty-three historic properties in Eutaw, Alabama

- U.S. National Register of Historic Places
- Location within Alabama
- Location: Eutaw, Alabama
- Coordinates: 32°50′26″N 87°53′15″W
- NRHP reference No.: 64000008

The Antebellum Homes in Eutaw Thematic Resource is a multiple property submission of houses that were listed together on the National Register of Historic Places. It covers twenty-three properties in Eutaw, Alabama, all built prior to the American Civil War.

They represent one of the most intact collections of domestic antebellum architecture to survive in the state. All were determined by the National Park Service to be historically or architecturally significant.

Resource Name	Also known as	Coordinates	City	County	Added	Notes
David Rinehart Anthony House	Wynne House	32°50′27″N 87°53′25″W	Eutaw	Greene County	April 2, 1982	Demolished
Gustave Braune House		32°50′18″N 87°53′15″W	Eutaw	Greene County	April 2, 1982	
Samuel W. Cockrell House		32°50′10″N 87°53′24″W	Eutaw	Greene County	December 6, 1982	
John Coleman House	Grassdale	32°51′36″N 87°55′24″W	Eutaw	Greene County	December 6, 1982	
Attoway R. Davis Home	Attoway Davis Cottage	32°50′27″N 87°53′27″W	Eutaw	Greene County	April 2, 1982	
John W. Elliott House		32°50′19″N 87°53′15″W	Eutaw	Greene County	April 2, 1982	Moved
Glenville	Jincy P. Glenn House	32°50′14″N 87°54′22″W	Eutaw	Greene County	April 2, 1982	
Rev. John H. Gray House		32°50′56″N 87°54′3″W	Eutaw	Greene County	April 2, 1982	
Benjamin D. Gullett House		32°50′25″N 87°53′24″W	Eutaw	Greene County	April 2, 1982	
Stephen Fowler Hale House	Hale-Jarvis-Trotter House	32°50′16″N 87°53′27″W	Eutaw	Greene County	April 2, 1982	
William C. Jones House	Archibald-Tuck House	32°50′37″N 87°53′44″W	Eutaw	Greene County	April 2, 1982	
Dr. Willis Meriwether House	Clark-Malone House	32°50′21″N 87°53′26″W	Eutaw	Greene County	April 2, 1982	
Samuel R. Murphy House	Winfield Scott Bird House	32°51′22″N 87°54′26″W	Eutaw	Greene County	April 2, 1982	
William Perkins House	Freemount	32°50′18″N 87°53′21″W	Eutaw	Greene County	April 2, 1982	
Littleberry Pippen House		32°50′34″N 87°53′17″W	Eutaw	Greene County	April 2, 1982	
Edwin Reese House	Reese-Phillips House	32°50′23″N 87°53′23″W	Eutaw	Greene County	April 2, 1982	
William A. Rogers House		32°51′22″N 87°54′22″W	Eutaw	Greene County	April 2, 1982	
Phillip Schoppert House		32°50′17″N 87°53′15″W	Eutaw	Greene County	April 2, 1982	
Iredell P. Vaughan House		32°50′31″N 87°53′27″W	Eutaw	Greene County	April 2, 1982	
William Peter Webb House		32°50′30″N 87°53′33″W	Eutaw	Greene County	April 2, 1982	
Asa White House	White-McGiffert House	32°50′35″N 87°53′29″W	Eutaw	Greene County	April 2, 1982	
Catlin Wilson House	Murphy Dunlap House	32°50′20″N 87°53′26″W	Eutaw	Greene County	April 2, 1982	
Daniel R. Wright House		32°50′34″N 87°53′0″W	Eutaw	Greene County	April 2, 1982	

== See also ==
- National Register of Historic Places Multiple Property Submissions in Alabama
- National Register of Historic Places listings in Greene County, Alabama
