= Daniel R. Wright House =

Historic house in Alabama, United States

- U.S. National Register of Historic Places
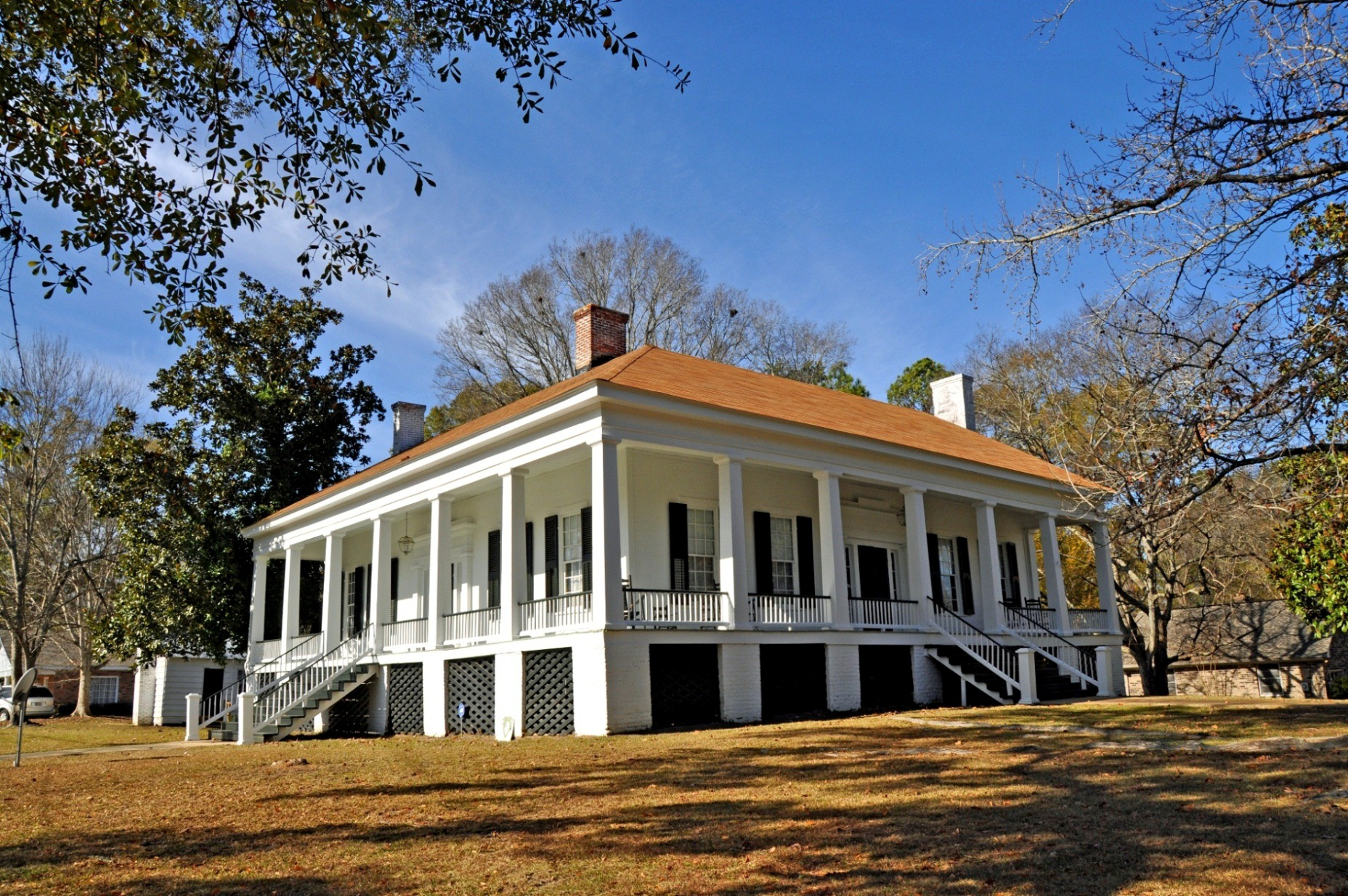

- Location within Alabama Location within the United States
- Location: 501 Pickens St., Eutaw, Alabama
- Coordinates: 32°50′37″N 87°53′17″W
- Area: 0.7 acres (0.28 ha)
- Built: 1847
- Architect: Herman Kretz
- Architectural style: Greek Revival
- MPS: Antebellum Homes in Eutaw TR
- NRHP reference No.: 82002035
- Added to NRHP: April 2, 1982

The Daniel R. Wright House, or the Murphy-Dunlap House, is a historic house in Eutaw, Alabama, United States. The one-story wood-frame house was built in 1847. It is built in the Greek Revival style, with a raised pier brick foundation. A one-story L-shaped porch spans the entire width of the east and south facades. It was added to the National Register of Historic Places as part of the Antebellum Homes in Eutaw Thematic Resource on April 2, 1982.
