= Glenville (Eutaw, Alabama) =

Historic house in Alabama, United States

- U.S. National Register of Historic Places
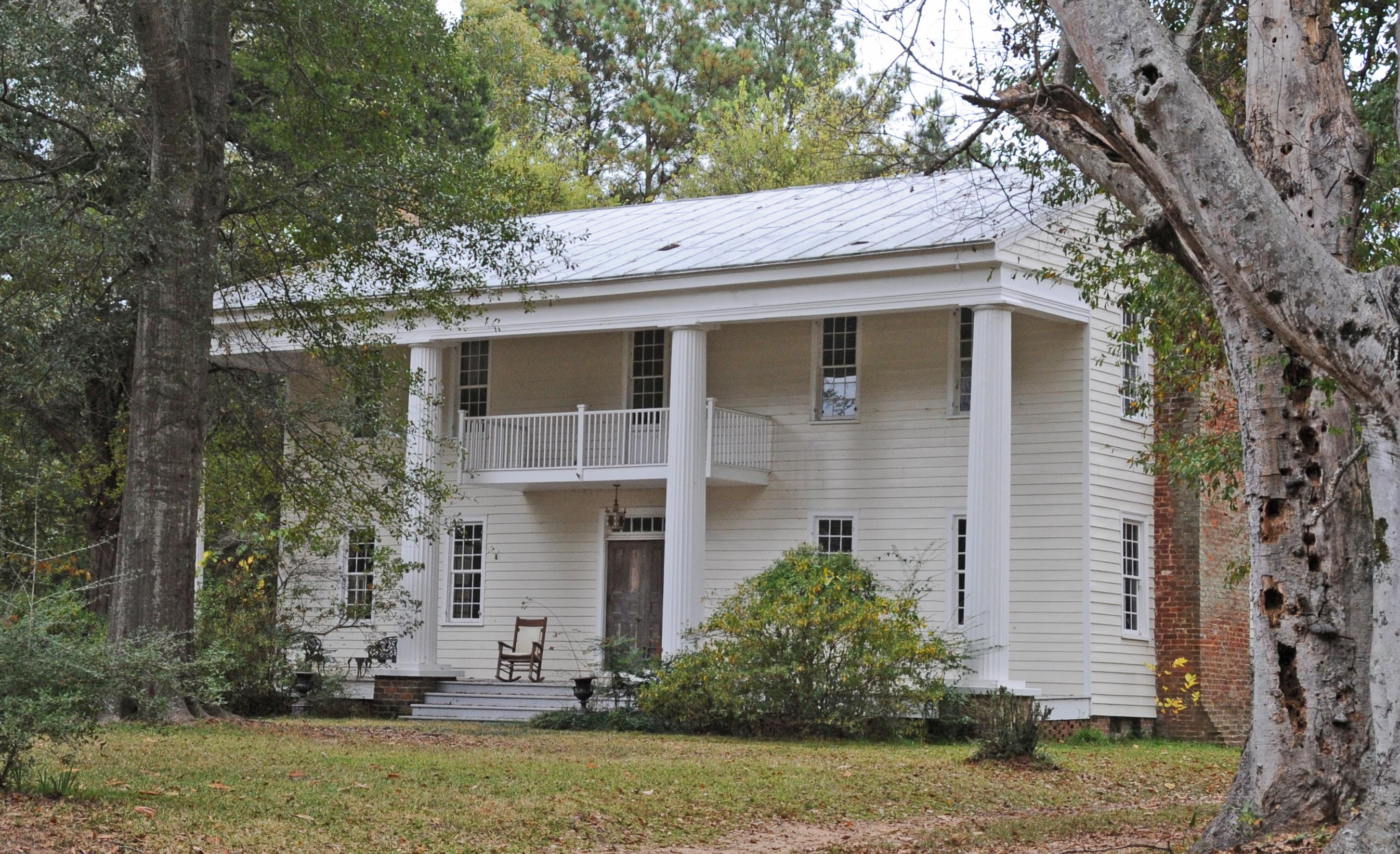
- Nearest city: Eutaw, Alabama
- Built: 1845
- MPS: Antebellum Homes in Eutaw Thematic Resource
- NRHP reference No.: 82002019
- Added to NRHP: April 2, 1982

Glenville, also known as the Jincy P. Glenn House, is a historic house in Eutaw, Alabama, United States. The structure was built in the mid-1840s for Jincy Pride Glenn. She was born in Virginia in 1776. Jincy Glenn was the widow of Daniel Glenn of Union County, South Carolina. The house was placed on the National Register of Historic Places as part of the Antebellum Homes in Eutaw Thematic Resource on April 2, 1982, due to its architectural significance.
