= Attoway R. Davis Home =

Historic house in Alabama, United States

- U.S. National Register of Historic Places
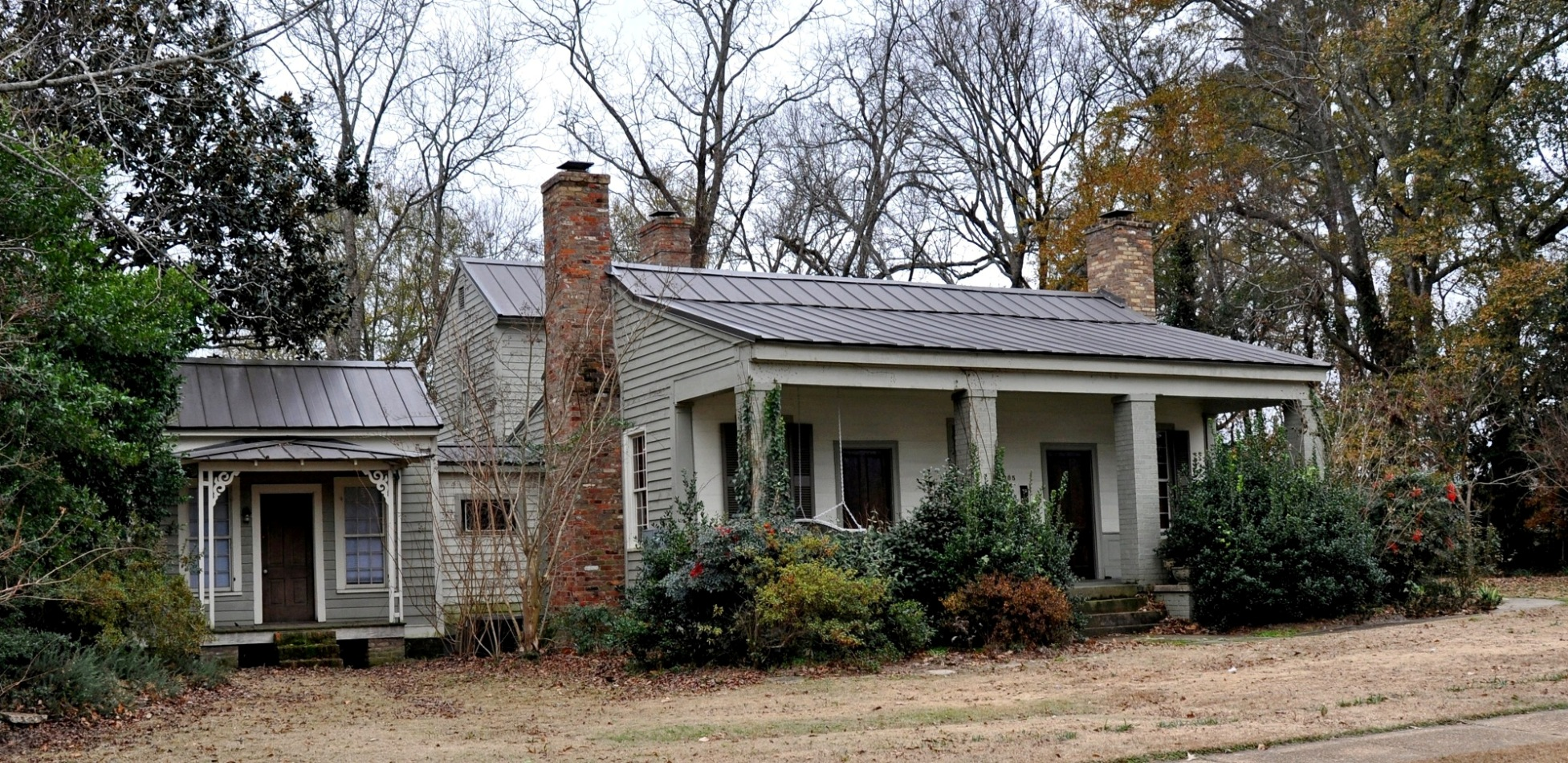

- Location within Alabama Location within the United States
- Location: 305 Main St., Eutaw, Alabama
- Coordinates: 32°50′24″N 87°53′19″W
- Built: 1817
- MPS: Antebellum Homes in Eutaw Thematic Resource
- NRHP reference No.: 82002017
- Added to NRHP: April 2, 1982

The Attoway R. Davis Home, also known as the Attoway Davis Cottage, is a historic house in Eutaw, Alabama, United States. The main block is a two-story I-house, built in 1817. It is the oldest surviving house in Eutaw. Directly in front of this main block is a two-room cottage, built in 1840. The rear of the cottage was later connected directly to the front of the main block. A physician built a one-room office on the grounds in 1850; it was later attached to the side of the two-room cottage. The house was placed on the National Register of Historic Places as part of the Antebellum Homes in Eutaw Thematic Resource on April 2, 1982, due to its architectural significance. It was restored by Ralph and Diana Liverman and now serves as a bed and breakfast.
