= Samuel W. Cockrell House =

Historic house in Alabama, United States

- U.S. National Register of Historic Places
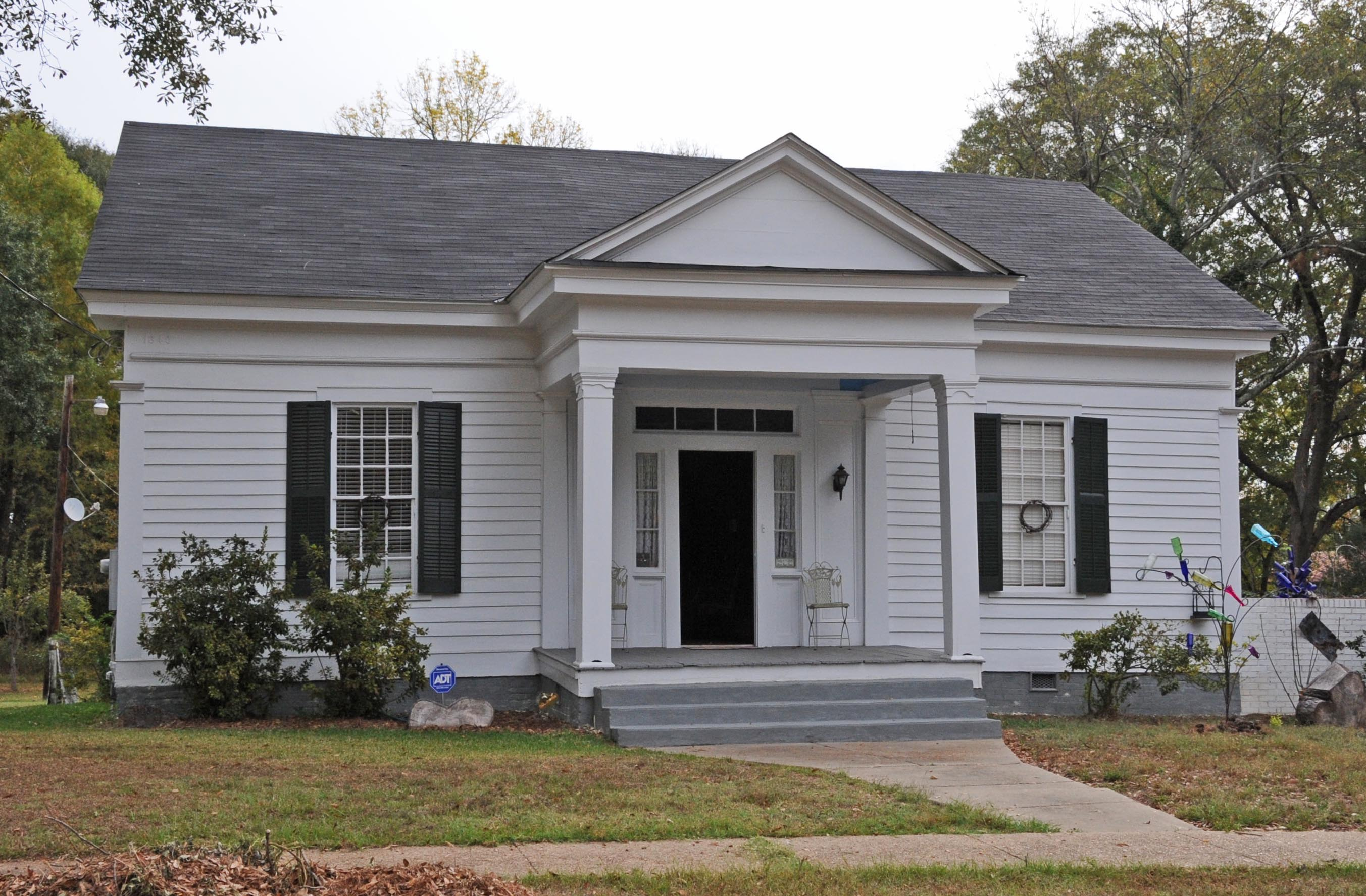

- Location within Alabama Location within the United States
- Location: 210 Wilson Street, Eutaw, Alabama
- Coordinates: 32°50′6″N 87°53′15″W
- Built: 1859
- MPS: Antebellum Homes in Eutaw Thematic Resource
- NRHP reference No.: 82001618
- Added to NRHP: December 6, 1982

The Samuel W. Cockrell House is a historic antebellum house in Eutaw, Alabama, United States. It was placed on the National Register of Historic Places as part of the Antebellum Homes in Eutaw Thematic Resource on December 6, 1982, due to its architectural significance.
