= John Coleman House =

Historic house in Alabama, United States

- U.S. National Register of Historic Places
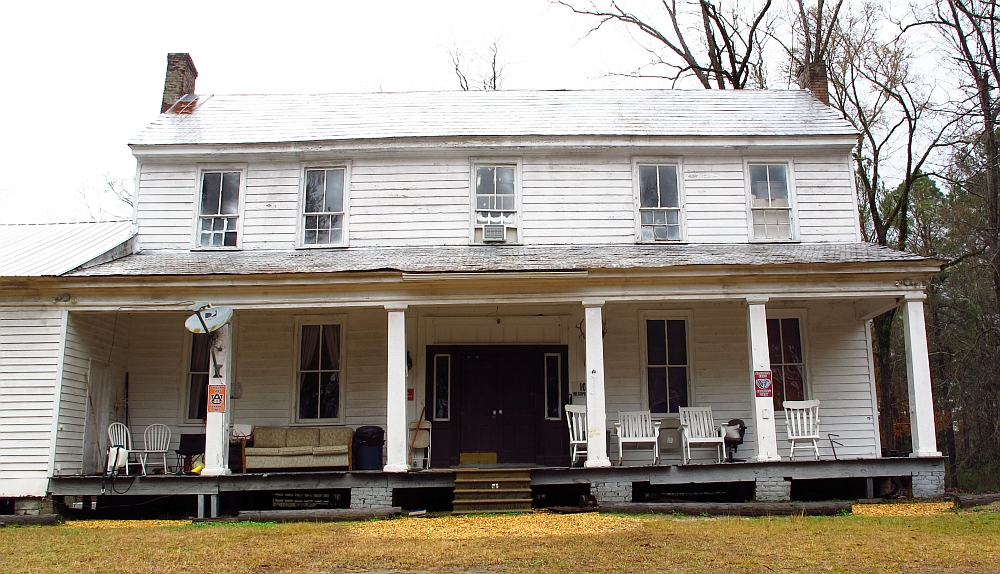
- Grassdale Plantation House (2013)

- Location within Alabama Location within the United States
- Nearest city: Eutaw, Alabama
- Coordinates: 32°51′42″N 87°55′26″W
- MPS: Antebellum Homes in Eutaw Thematic Resource
- NRHP reference No.: 82001617
- Added to NRHP: December 6, 1982

The John Coleman House, also known as Grassdale, is a historic plantation house in Eutaw, Alabama, United States. The two-story wood-frame I-house was built by John Coleman from Edgefield, South Carolina, on property that he settled in 1819. Coleman held 75 slaves during the 1840 United States census of Greene County. The house was placed on the National Register of Historic Places as part of the Antebellum Homes in Eutaw Thematic Resource on December 6, 1982, due to its architectural significance. Coleman family members, as well as many slaves, are buried in a cemetery close to the house. The house is currently used as a hunting lodge.

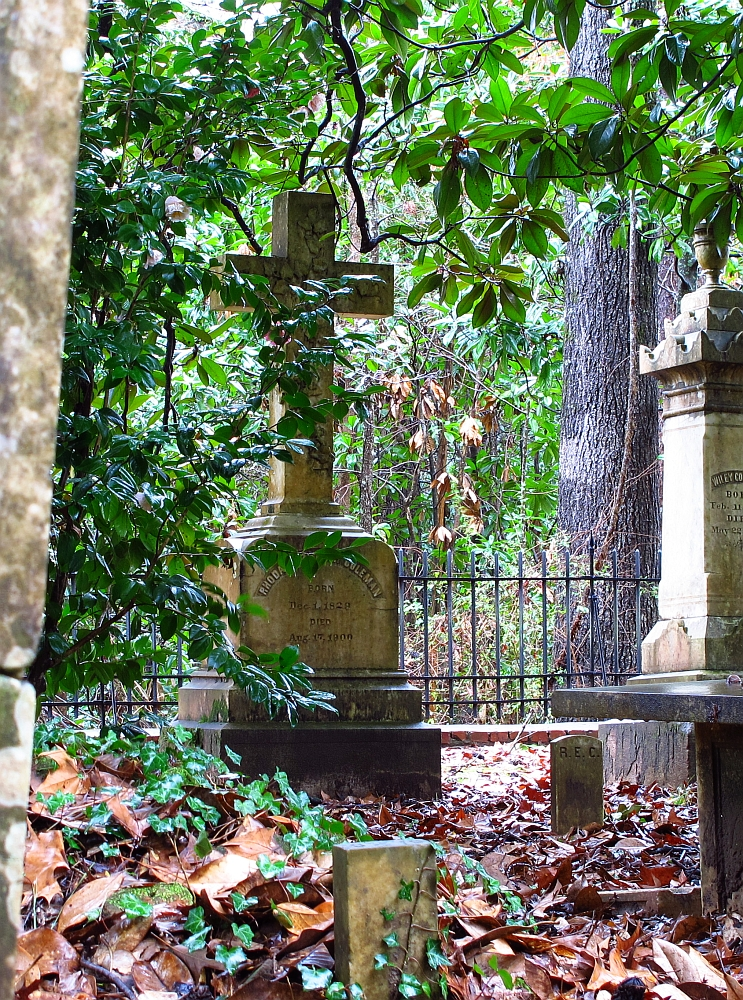
Grassdale Cemetery
