= William Peter Webb House =

Historic house in Alabama, United States

- U.S. National Register of Historic Places
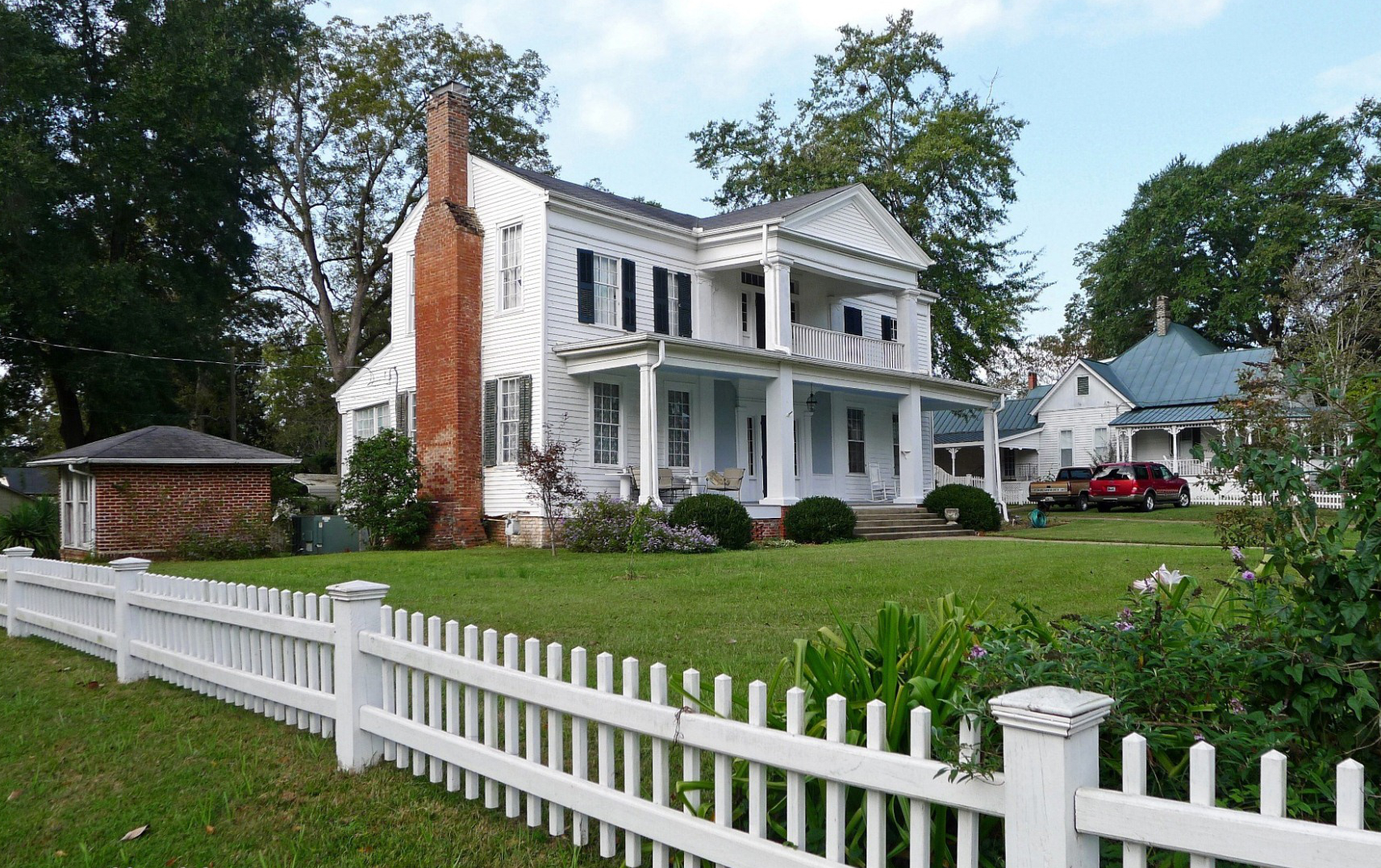

- Location within Alabama Location within the United States
- Location: 401 Main St., Eutaw, Alabama
- Coordinates: 32°50′26″N 87°53′26″W
- Area: less than one acre
- Built: 1840
- Architect: Benjamin D. Gullett
- Architectural style: Greek Revival, I-house
- MPS: Antebellum Homes in Eutaw TR
- NRHP reference No.: 82002032
- Added to NRHP: April 2, 1982

The William Peter Webb House is a historic house in Eutaw, Alabama, United States. The two-story wood-frame house was built c. 1840. It is an I-house, with a Greek Revival-style distyle portico and other details added sometime later in the mid-19th century. It was added to the National Register of Historic Places as part of the Antebellum Homes in Eutaw Thematic Resource on April 2, 1982.
