= Gustave Braune House =

Historic house in Alabama, United States

- U.S. National Register of Historic Places
- Alabama Register of Landmarks and Heritage
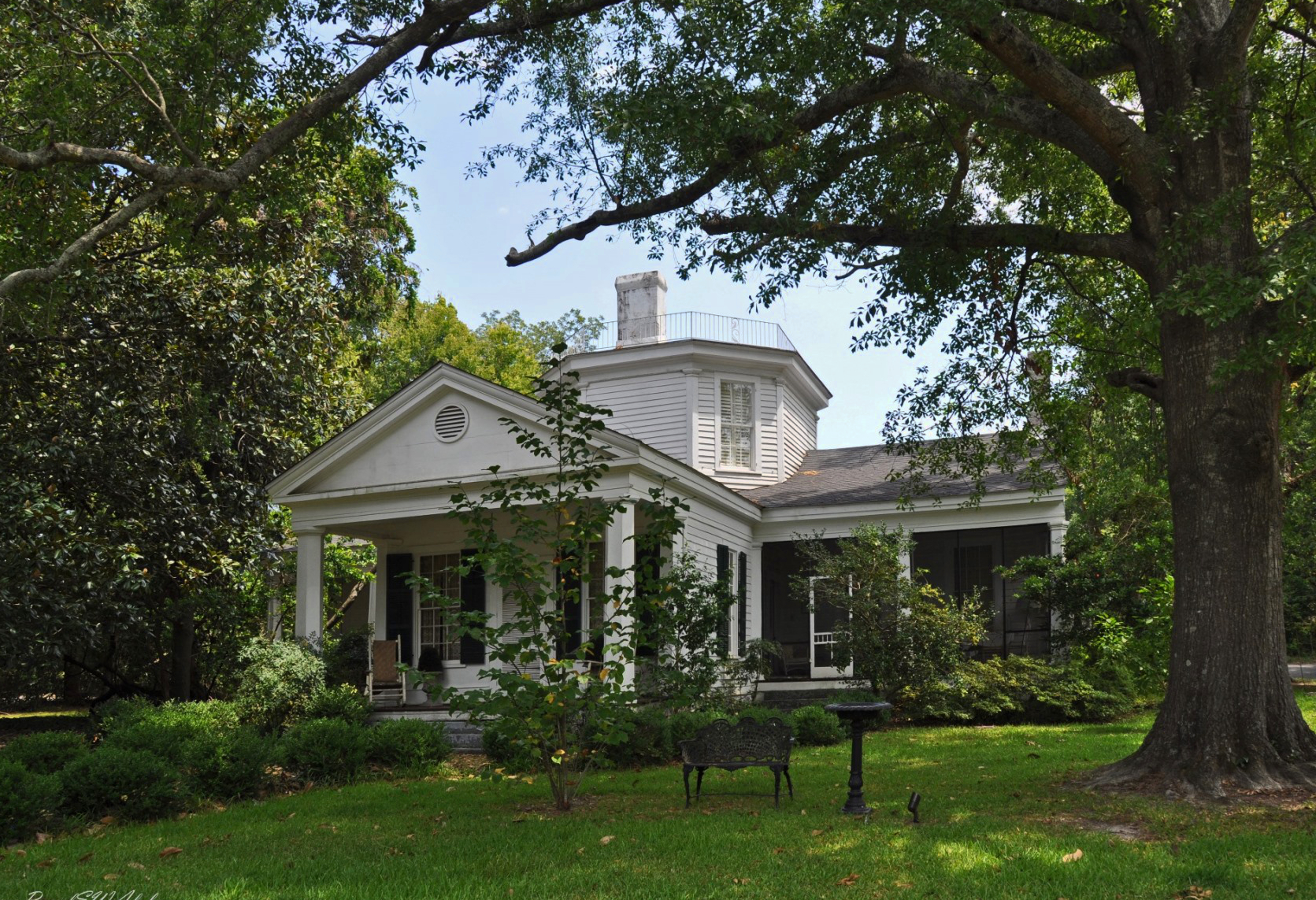

- Location within Alabama Location within the United States
- Location: 236 Prairie St., Eutaw, Alabama
- Coordinates: 32°50′16″N 87°53′5″W
- Built: 1850
- Architectural style: Greek Revival
- MPS: Antebellum Homes in Eutaw Thematic Resource
- NRHP reference No.: 82002016

Significant dates
- Added to NRHP: April 2, 1982
- Designated ARLH: October 12, 1976

The Gustave Braune House is a historic house at 236 Prairie Street in Eutaw, Alabama, United States.

== Description and history ==
The two-story, timber-framed, Greek Revival-style house was built in 1850, and assumed its current form in about 1860. It has one main floor, with an octagonal upper story room projecting above the center of the main block and overlooking the property. The house takes its name from Gustave Braune, a jeweller.

It was added to the Alabama Register of Landmarks and Heritage on October 12, 1976, and subsequently placed on the National Register of Historic Places as part of the Antebellum Homes in Eutaw Thematic Resource on April 2, 1982.
