= David Rinehart Anthony House =

Historic house in Alabama, United States

- U.S. National Register of Historic Places
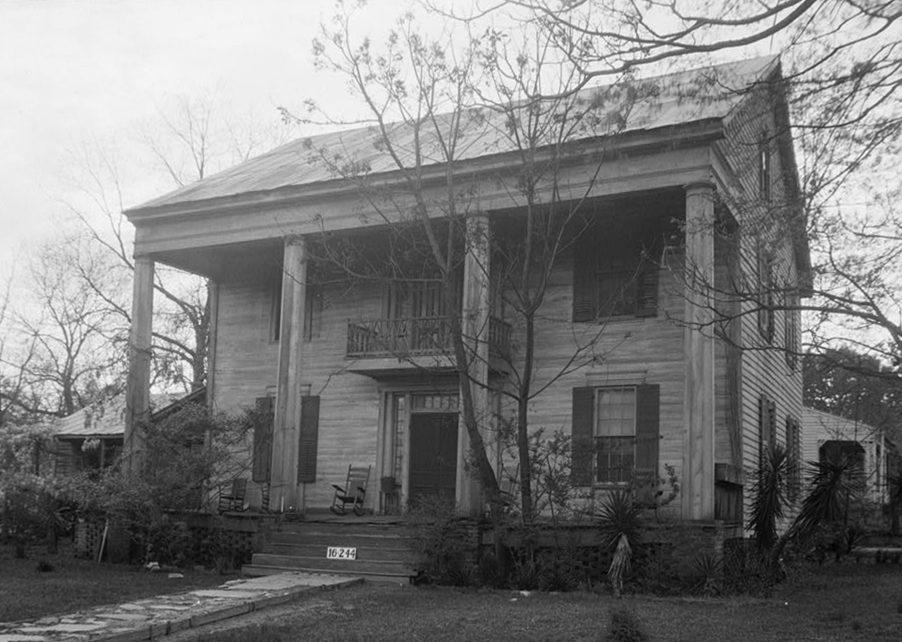
- The house in 1934

- Location within Alabama Location within the United States
- Location: 307 Wilson Ave., Eutaw, Alabama
- Coordinates: 32°50′23″N 87°53′17″W
- Built: 1860
- Architect: David Rinehart Anthony
- Architectural style: Greek Revival
- MPS: Antebellum Homes in Eutaw Thematic Resource
- NRHP reference No.: 82002015
- Added to NRHP: April 2, 1982

The David Rinehart Anthony House, also known as the Wynne House, is a historic vernacular Greek Revival style house in Eutaw, Alabama, United States. The house is a two-story wood-framed building on a brick foundation. Four octagonal columns span the front portico. It was built in 1860 by David Rinehart Anthony. It was added to the National Register of Historic Places as a part of the Antebellum Homes in Eutaw Thematic Resource on April 2, 1982, due to its architectural significance.
