= William B. Wills House =

Historic house in Alabama, United States

- U.S. National Register of Historic Places
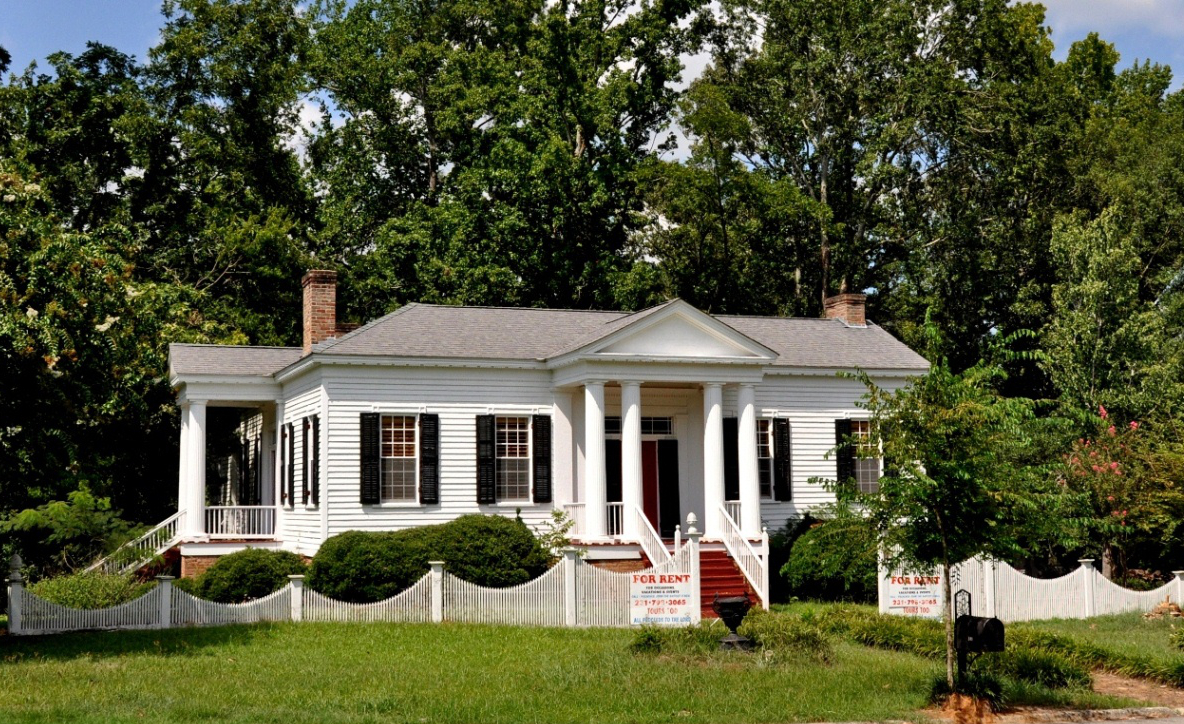

- Location within Alabama Location within the United States
- Location: 108 Ashby Dr., Eutaw, Alabama
- Coordinates: 32°50′50″N 87°53′44″W
- Area: 2 acres (0.81 ha)
- Built: 1835
- Architectural style: Greek Revival
- NRHP reference No.: 83002969
- Added to NRHP: September 22, 1983

The William B. Wills House, commonly known as Sipsey, is a historic house in Eutaw, Alabama, United States. The one-story wood-frame house was built c. 1835. It is built in the Greek Revival style, atop a high brick foundation. A pedimented Doric portico spans the main entrance in the center of the five-bay main facade. The house was relocated in 1978 from 17 miles (27 km) northwest of Eutaw in order to preserve it. It was added to the National Register of Historic Places on September 22, 1983.
