= John W. Elliott House =

Historic house in Alabama, United States

- U.S. National Register of Historic Places
- Location within Alabama Location within the United States
- Location: 244 Prairie Street; Eutaw, Alabama, United States
- Coordinates: 32°50′17″N 87°53′3″W
- Built: 1850
- Architect: Jesse Gibson
- Architectural style: Creole cottage
- MPS: Antebellum Homes in Eutaw Thematic Resource
- NRHP reference No.: 82002018
- Added to NRHP: April 2, 1982

The John W. Elliott House is a historic house in Eutaw, Alabama, United States. The Creole cottage style structure was built in 1850 by Jesse Gibson for John Williams Elliott, a watchmaker and jeweler. Elliott was born in 1814 in Litchfield County, Connecticut. He migrated to Eutaw around 1840. Elliott married Louisa Elizabeth Towner, a teacher and native of Rutland County, Vermont, in 1843. They had three children, all born and raised in Eutaw. Louisa died in 1853. John then married Blanche Smith Chapman, a native of Virginia, in 1858. The Elliott family left Eutaw prior to the outbreak of the American Civil War and relocated to Brooklyn, New York, where John Elliott died in 1888. The house was placed on the National Register of Historic Places as part of the Antebellum Homes in Eutaw Thematic Resource on April 2, 1982, due to its architectural significance. It has been moved elsewhere since listing. The site is now a parking lot.
