= Benjamin D. Gullett House =

Historic house in Alabama, United States

- U.S. National Register of Historic Places
- Location within Alabama Location within the United States
- Location: 317 Main Street; Eutaw, Alabama
- Coordinates: 32°50′30″N 87°53′31″W
- Built: 1841
- Architect: Gullett, Benjamin D.
- MPS: Antebellum Homes in Eutaw Thematic Resource
- NRHP reference No.: 82002021
- Added to NRHP: April 2, 1982

The Benjamin D. Gullett House is a historic structure in Eutaw, Alabama, United States. The house was placed on the National Register of Historic Places as part of the Antebellum Homes in Eutaw Thematic Resource on April 2, 1982, due to its architectural significance.
