= Catlin Wilson House =

Historic house in Alabama, United States

- U.S. National Register of Historic Places
- Alabama Register of Landmarks and Heritage
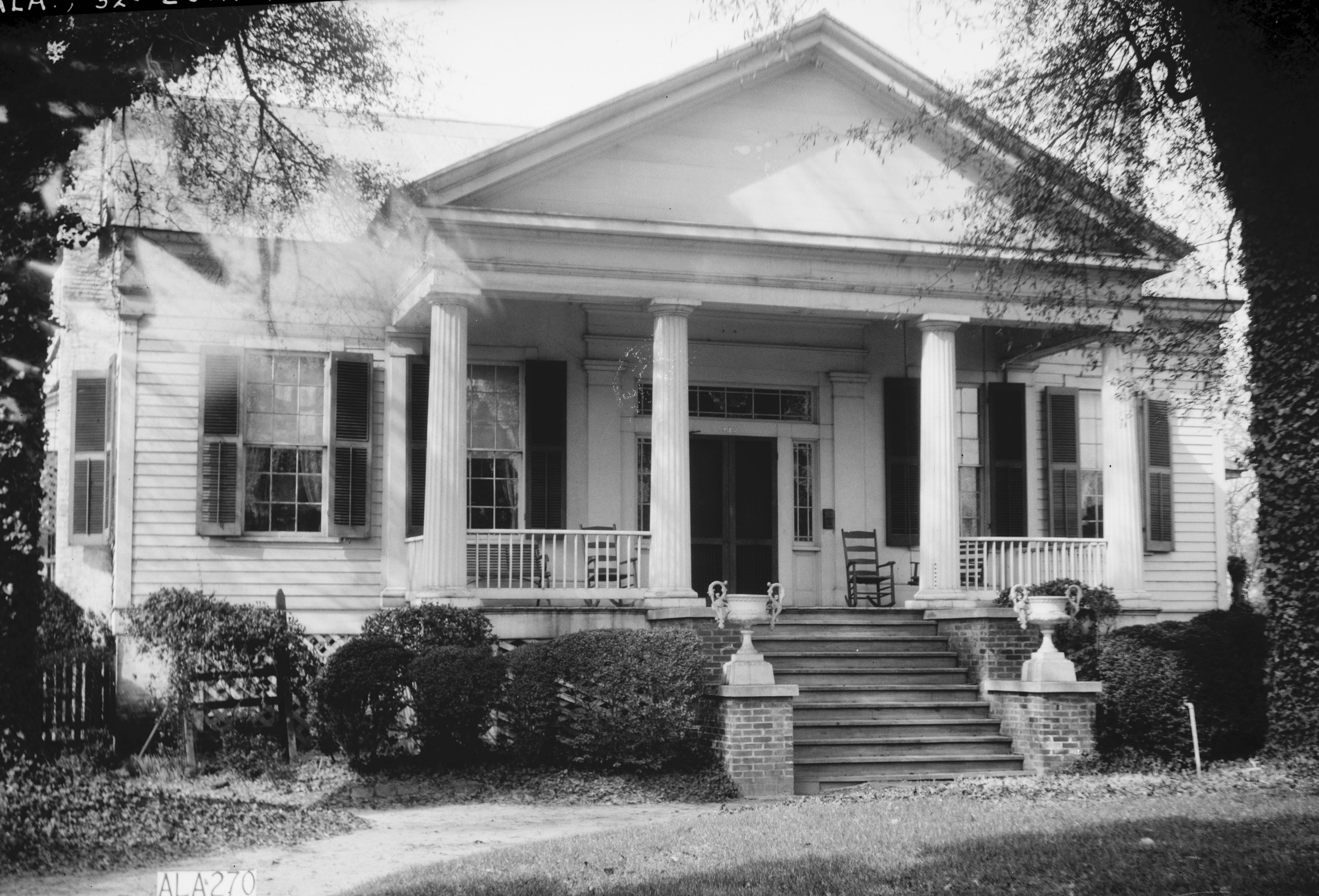
- The house in 1936, as recorded by the Historic American Buildings Survey

- Location within Alabama Location within the United States
- Location: 237 Wilson Avenue; Eutaw, Alabama
- Coordinates: 32°50′20″N 87°53′27″W
- Built: 1844
- Architectural style: Greek Revival
- MPS: Antebellum Homes in Eutaw Thematic Resource
- NRHP reference No.: 82002034

Significant dates
- Added to NRHP: April 2, 1982
- Designated ARLH: November 5, 1976

The Catlin Wilson House, also known as the Murphy Dunlap House, is a historic Greek Revival style house in Eutaw, Alabama, United States. The one-story wood-framed building was built in 1844. A pedimented front portico with four Doric columns covers the three central bays of the front facade. The house was recorded by the Historic American Buildings Survey in 1936. It was listed on the Alabama Register of Landmarks and Heritage on November 5, 1976. It was subsequently added to the National Register of Historic Places as a part of the Antebellum Homes in Eutaw Thematic Resource on April 2, 1982, due to its architectural significance.
