= Coleman–Banks House =

Historic house in Alabama, United States

- U.S. National Register of Historic Places
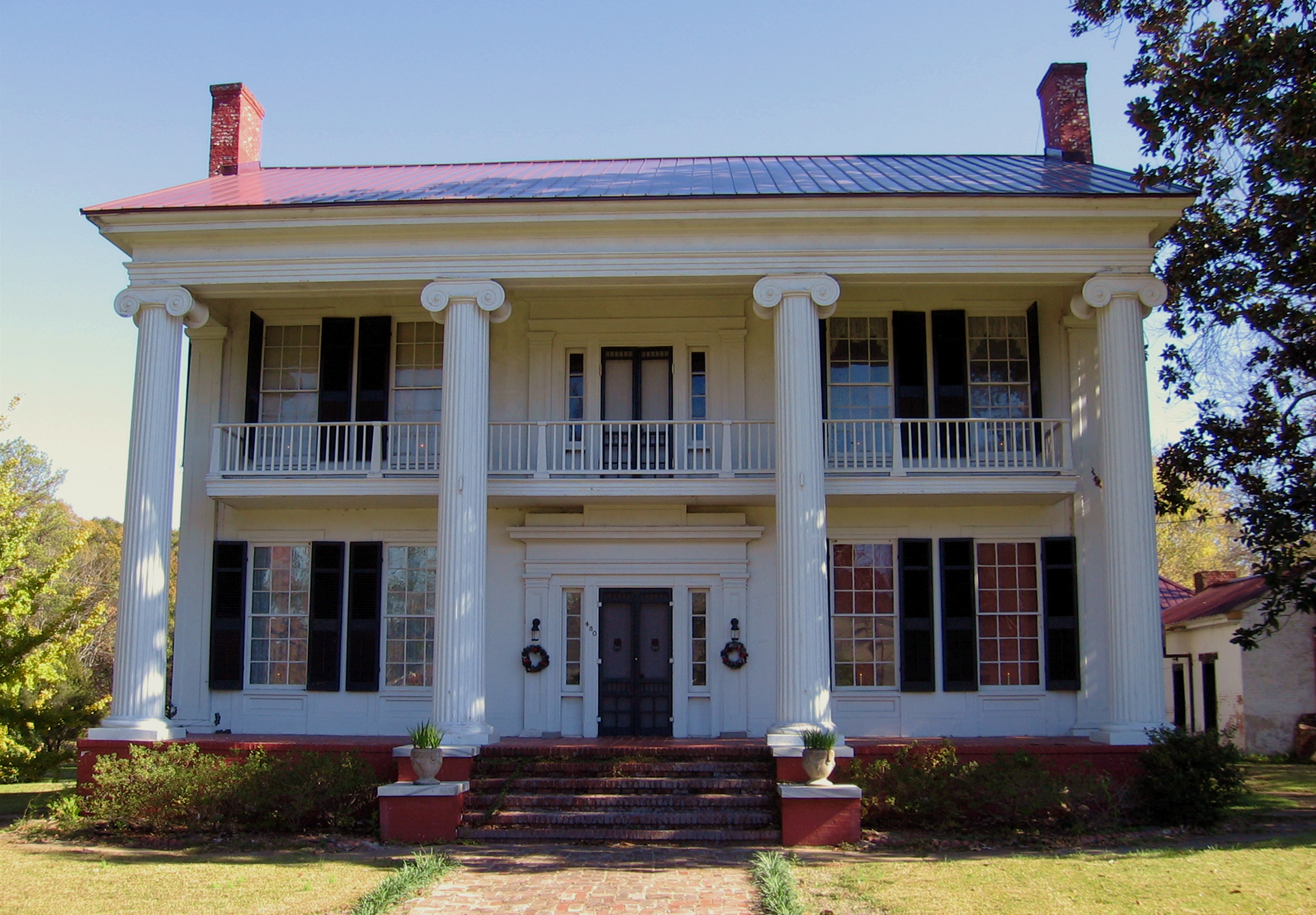
- The house in 2008

- Location within Alabama Location within the United States
- Location: 430 Springfield Road; Eutaw, Alabama
- Coordinates: 32°50′29″N 87°53′14″W
- Built: 1847
- Architect: Shauver, George W.
- Architectural style: Greek Revival
- NRHP reference No.: 70000102
- Added to NRHP: December 18, 1970

The Coleman–Banks House, also known as the James Oliver Banks House, is a historic Greek Revival style house in Eutaw, Alabama, United States. It was built in 1847 by George W. Shauver. It was purchased by Rhoda Coleman in 1857 and then by James Oliver Banks in 1890. The house is a two-story structure with four monumental Ionic columns spanning the front portico. It features elaborate Greek Revival doorways in the central bay of the front facade. The house was recorded by the Historic American Buildings Survey in 1934. The Greene County Historical Society purchased the house in 1968. It was added to the National Register of Historic Places on December 18, 1970, due to its architectural significance.
