= Kirkwood (Eutaw, Alabama) =

Historic house in Alabama, United States

- U.S. National Register of Historic Places
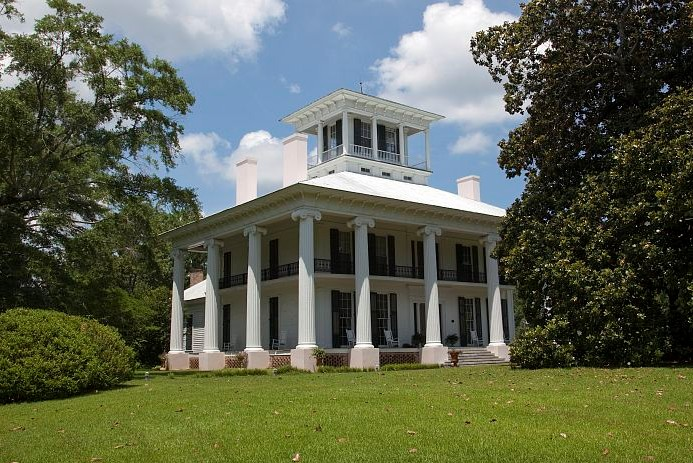
- Kirkwood in 2010, by Carol M. Highsmith

- Location within Alabama Location within the United States
- Location: 111 Kirkwood Dr., Eutaw, Alabama
- Coordinates: 32°50′48″N 87°53′45″W
- Built: 1858
- Architectural style: Greek Revival, Italianate
- NRHP reference No.: 76000327
- Added to NRHP: May 17, 1976

Kirkwood is a historic plantation house in Eutaw, Alabama, United States. The house was recorded by the Historic American Buildings Survey in 1934 and by Carol M. Highsmith in 2010. It was placed on the National Register of Historic Places on May 17, 1976, due to its architectural significance.

== Architecture ==
Kirkwood is built in the Greek Revival style with Italianate influences. Foster M. Kirksey began building the house in 1858. Construction was halted by the American Civil War, leaving several features of the house incomplete. The house is wood framed with two primary floors and a large cupola crowning the low-pitched hipped roof. The roof eaves are ornamented with wooden brackets. A Carolina-type monumental portico with Ionic columns wraps around two sides of the house. The balcony railings, cupola, and several minor features were completed in the 1970s, when Roy and Mary Swayze restored the house. The Swayze family was awarded a National Trust for Historic Preservation Honor Award in 1982 for their restoration efforts.
