= Asa White House =

Historic house in Alabama, United States

- U.S. National Register of Historic Places
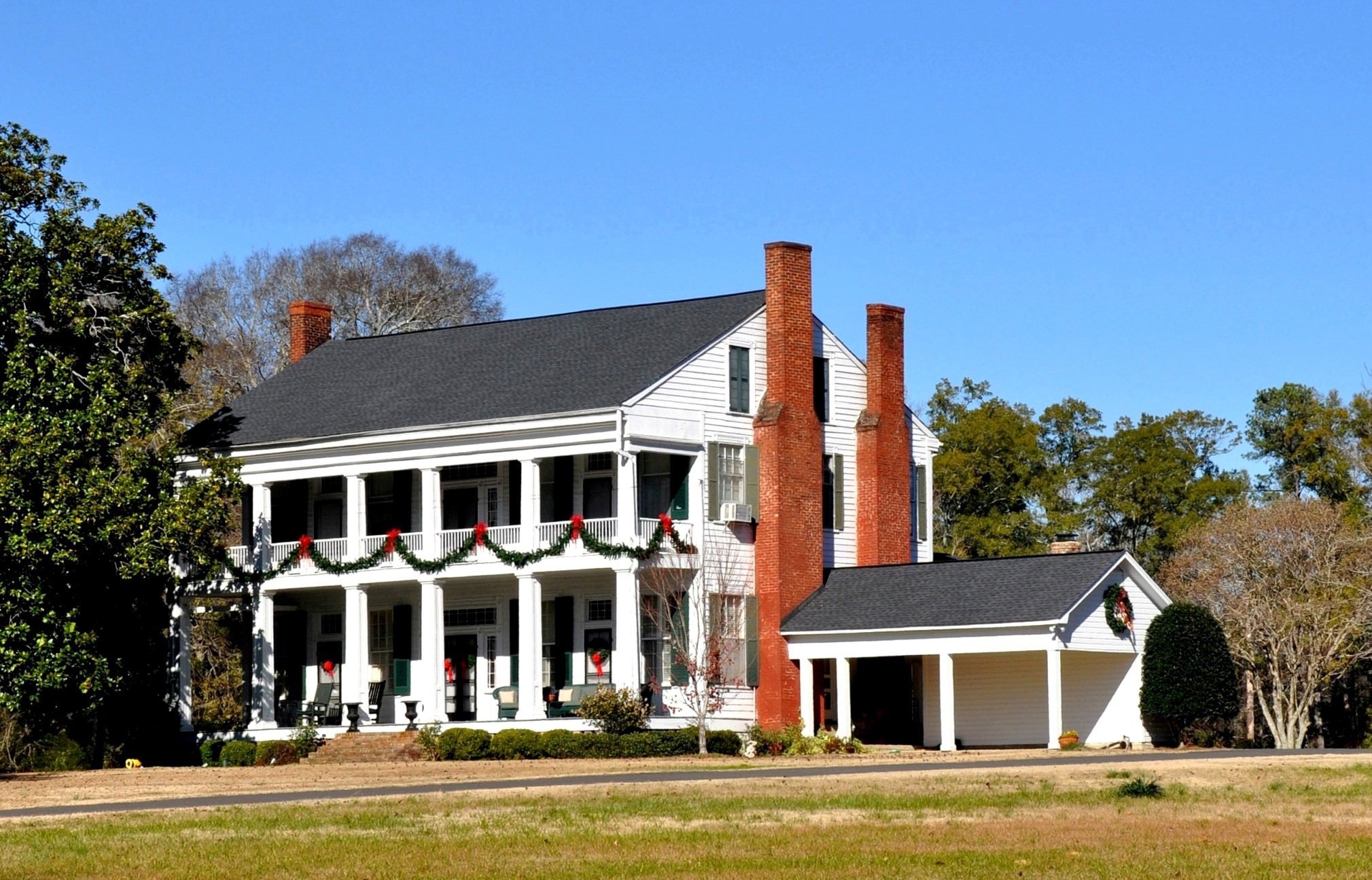

- Location within Alabama Location within the United States
- Interactive map showing the location for Asa White House
- Location: 314 Mesopotamia Street; Eutaw, Alabama
- Coordinates: 32°50′30″N 87°53′2″W
- Built: 1838
- Architectural style: Federal, Greek Revival
- MPS: Antebellum Homes in Eutaw Thematic Resource
- NRHP reference No.: 82002033
- Added to NRHP: April 2, 1982

The Asa White House, also known as the White-McGiffert House, is a historic house in Eutaw, Alabama, United States. It was built in 1838 by Asa White, one of Greene County's earliest settlers. Eutaw was established on property owned by Asa White. He conveyed 20 acres (8.1 ha) to the newly established county seat in 1838 for the building of a courthouse, civic buildings, and a commercial district. He then sold residential lots to individuals. His house is a two-story frame building. It was built in the Federal style and later altered with the addition of Greek Revival-influenced details. The house was recorded by the Historic American Buildings Survey in 1936. It was added to the National Register of Historic Places as a part of the Antebellum Homes in Eutaw Thematic Resource on April 2, 1982, due to its architectural significance.
