= William Perkins House =

Historic house in Alabama, United States

- U.S. National Register of Historic Places
- Alabama Register of Landmarks and Heritage
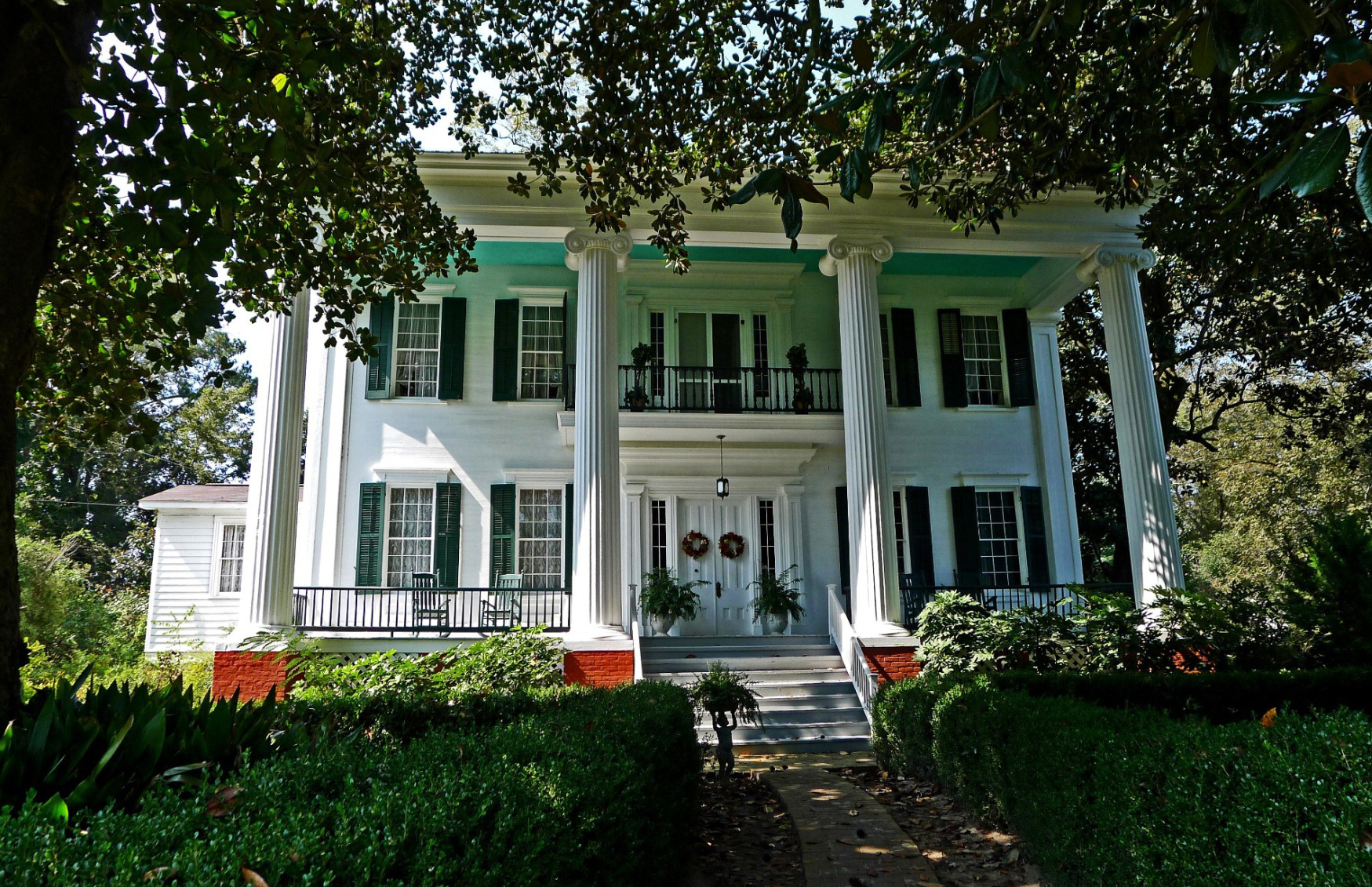

- Location within Alabama Location within the United States
- Location: 89 Spencer Street; Eutaw, Alabama
- Coordinates: 32°50′15″N 87°53′11″W
- Built: 1850
- Architectural style: Greek Revival
- MPS: Antebellum Homes in Eutaw TR
- NRHP reference No.: 82002026

Significant dates
- Added to NRHP: April 2, 1982
- Designated ARLH: October 17, 1980

The William Perkins House, now known as the Freemount, is a historic Greek Revival style house in Eutaw, Alabama, United States. The house is a two-story wood-framed building on a raised brick foundation. Four monumental Ionic columns span the front portico. It was built in 1850 by William Perkins on the Eutaw Town Square. According to the 1850 U. S. Federal Census Slave Schedule, William Perkins' household in Greene County included eleven enslaved people, four women and seven men. Their ages ranged from 2–45 years old, and Mr. Perkins is listed as the slave owner. The house was recorded by the Historic American Buildings Survey in 1934. It was added to the National Register of Historic Places as a part of the Antebellum Homes in Eutaw Thematic Resource on April 2, 1982, due to its architectural significance. It is also listed on the Alabama Register of Landmarks and Heritage.
