= Greene County Courthouse Square District =

Historic district in Alabama, United States

- U.S. National Register of Historic Places
- U.S. Historic district
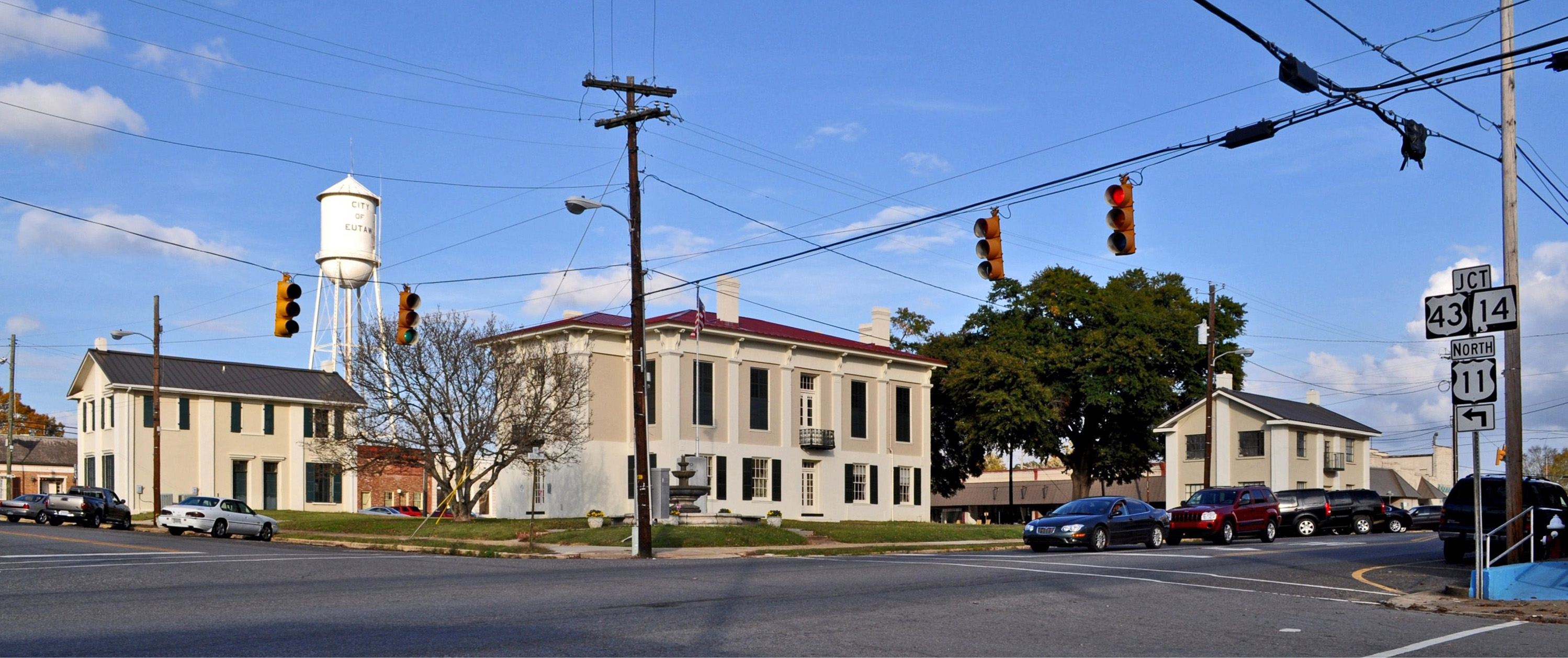

- Location within Alabama Location within the United States
- Location: U.S. 11 and AL7; Eutaw, Alabama, United States
- Coordinates: 32°50′25″N 87°53′17″W
- NRHP reference No.: 79000385 (original); 100012396 (increase)

Significant dates
- Added to NRHP: December 31, 1979
- Boundary increase: December 18, 2025

The Greene County Courthouse Square District is a historic district in Eutaw, Alabama, United States. It is centered on the old Old Greene County Courthouse and extends outward along U.S. Route 11 and Alabama State Route 7. It features examples of Greek Revival and commercial architecture. The district was added to the National Register of Historic Places on December 31, 1979.
