= First Presbyterian Church (Eutaw, Alabama) =

Historic church in Alabama, United States

- U.S. National Register of Historic Places
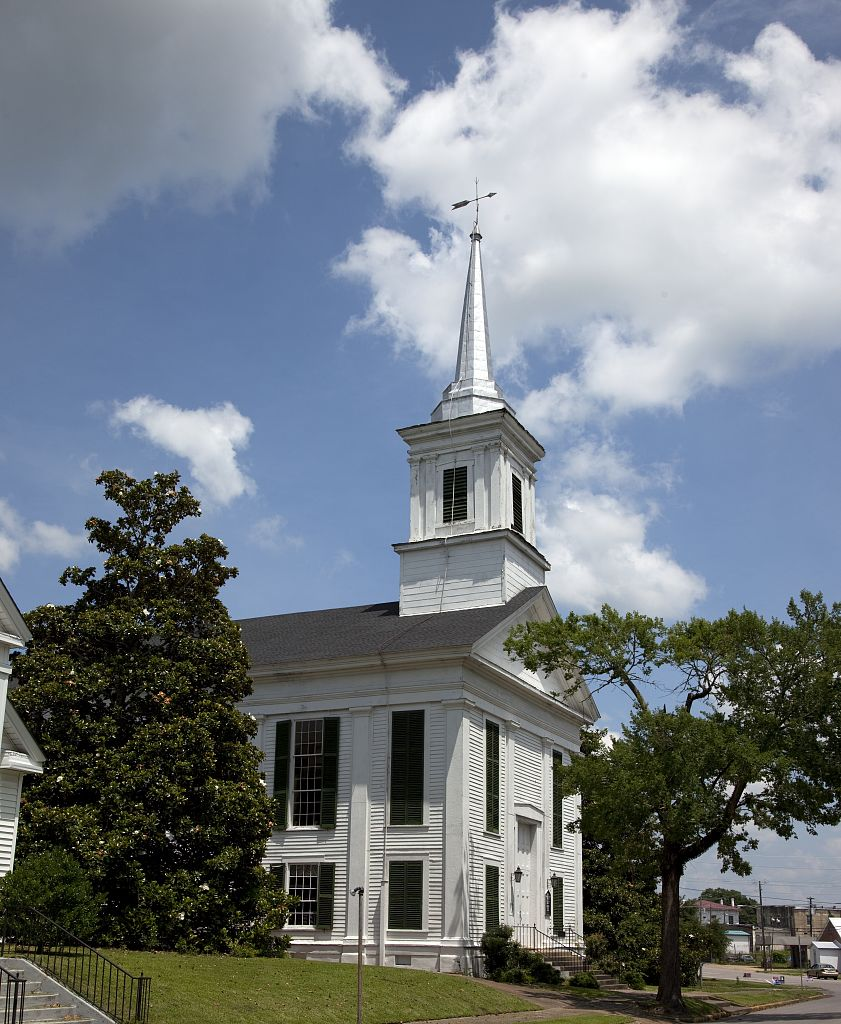
- First Presbyterian Church in 2010

- Location within Alabama Location within the United States
- Location: Main Street and Wilson Avenue; Eutaw, Alabama, United States
- Coordinates: 32°50′28″N 87°53′26″W
- Built: 1851
- Architectural style: Greek Revival
- NRHP reference No.: 74000411
- Added to NRHP: December 16, 1974

The First Presbyterian Church is a historic Greek Revival church building in Eutaw, Alabama, United States. The two-story frame structure was built for the local Presbyterian congregation in 1851 by David R. Anthony. Anthony was a local contractor who constructed many of Eutaw's antebellum buildings. The congregation was organized by the Tuscaloosa Presbytery in 1824 as the Mesopotamia Presbyterian Church. John H. Gray served as the first minister from 1826 until 1836. The church was added to the National Register of Historic Places on December 16, 1974, due to its architectural and historical significance. The church is a member of the Presbyterian Church in America.
