= Eutaw, Alabama =

City in and county seat of Greene County, Alabama

Eutaw
- City
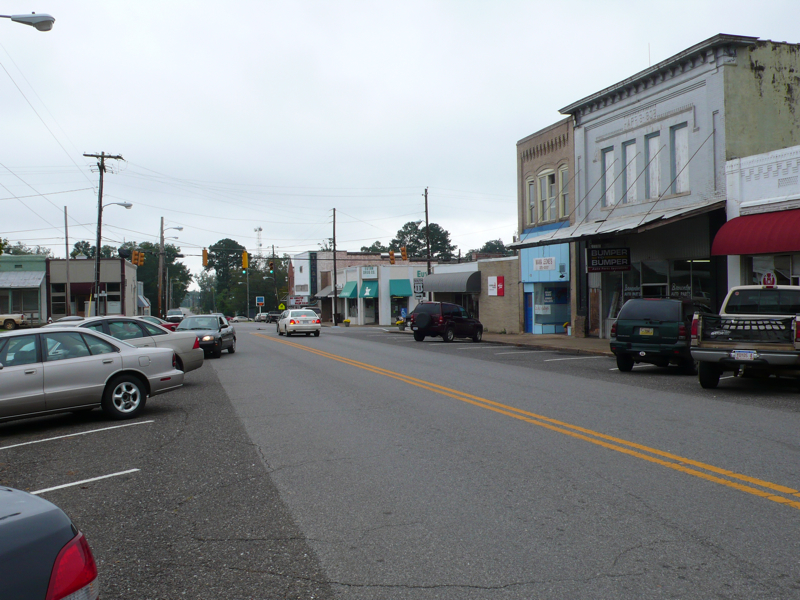
- Downtown Eutaw

- Seal

- Location of Eutaw in Greene County, Alabama.
- Coordinates: 32°50′46″N 87°53′50″W
- Country: United States
- State: Alabama
- County: Greene

Area
  - Total: 12.01 sq mi (31.10 km^{2})
  - Land: 11.93 sq mi (30.91 km^{2})
  - Water: 0.077 sq mi (0.20 km^{2})
- Elevation: 203 ft (62 m)

Population (2020)
  - Total: 2,937
  - Density: 246.1/sq mi (95.03/km^{2})
- Time zone: UTC-6 (Central (CST))
  - Summer (DST): UTC-5 (CDT)
- ZIP code: 35462
- Area codes: 205 & 659
- FIPS code: 01-24664
- GNIS feature ID: 2406470

Eutaw (/ˈjuːtɔː/ YOO-taw) is a city in and the county seat of Greene County, Alabama, United States. At the 2020 census, its population was 2,937. The city was named in honor of the Battle of Eutaw Springs, the last engagement of the American Revolutionary War in the Carolinas.

== History ==
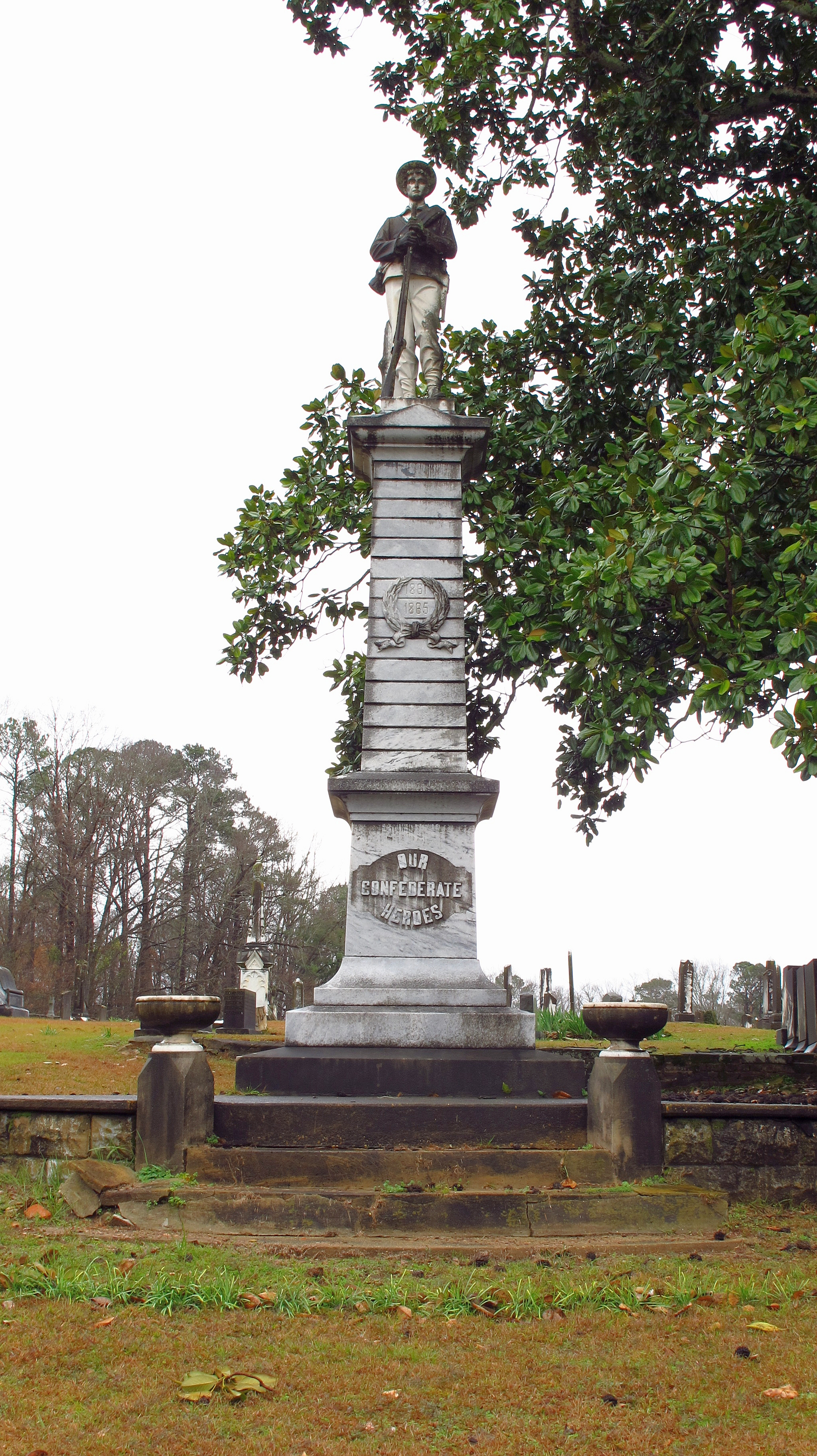
Confederate statue in Eutaw's Mesopotamia Cemetery

Eutaw was laid out in December 1838 at the time that Greene County voters chose to relocate the county seat from Erie, which was located on the Black Warrior River. It was incorporated by an act of the state legislature on January 2, 1841.

As the county seat, Eutaw also developed as the trading center for the county, which developed an economy based on cultivation and processing of cotton, the chief commodity crop in the antebellum years. The crop was lucrative for major planters, who depended on the labor of enslaved African Americans and built fine homes in the city. Many have been preserved. Eutaw has 27 antebellum structures on the National Register of Historic Places. All but four of these are included in the Antebellum Homes in Eutaw multiple property submission. The Coleman-Banks House, Old Greene County Courthouse, First Presbyterian Church, and Kirkwood are listed individually. Additionally, the Greene County Courthouse Square District is a listed historic district in the heart of downtown. A nearby property, Everhope Plantation, is also listed in the register.

During the Reconstruction Era, Eutaw was the site of a number of Klan murders and acts by insurgents. The county courthouse was burned in 1868; the prevailing theory for the burning of the courthouse is that it was intended to destroy the records of some 1,800 suits by freedmen against planters, which were about to be prosecuted. On March 31, 1870, the Republican county solicitor, Alexander Boyd, was shot and killed at his hotel when resisting being taken by a masked group of armed Klan members. (An early-20th-century historian of the Klan claimed the group was from Mississippi.) That same night, James Martin, a black Republican leader, was killed near his home in Union, Alabama, also in Greene County.

In the fall of 1870, in the run-up to the gubernatorial election, two more black Republican politicians were killed in Greene County. On October 25, 1870, whites attacked a Republican rally in the courthouse square that had attracted 2,000 black Republicans. The Eutaw massacre resulted in four black deaths and some 54 wounded outside the county courthouse. Most blacks did not vote in the fall's election, which helped the Democratic candidate for governor.

The use of violence and intimidation of blacks continued across Alabama in the post-Reconstruction era. Lynchings took place in the state, but none was documented in Greene County during this period, according to a 2015 report by the Equal Justice Initiative. This may be attributable to local officials enforcing the rule of law. On May 16, 1892, Sheriff Cullen and Deputy Sheriff E. C. Meredith of Greene County, with aid of a posse, distinguished themselves by going into Pickens County after a lynch mob of about 50 men. The mob had taken African-American suspect Jim Jones from the Greene County jail, saying they were going to hang him in Carrollton for an alleged crime there. Cullen and his posse confronted the mob at gunpoint, and took Jones back to Greene County.

=== 20th century to present ===
During and after the Civil Rights Era, Eutaw found itself at the center of racial controversy once again. In 1969, Greene County elected Black farmers to 6 of 7 county commission seats. It was the first time since Reconstruction that an Alabama county government had a Black majority. D.W. Bailey, the white city clerk of Eutaw, expressed local white outrage when he told The Atlanta Constitution, "this is the white man's country-this is not the Negro's country". However, Eutaw, which remained a city split 50/50 along racial lines in the 1960s, continued to have an all-White city council and a White mayor. It was not until 1984, when State Representative Lucius Black (D-York) sponsored a bill to annex Black agricultural communities into Eutaw's city limits, that black people would win election to city office. State Rep. Black's bill was filibustered by a White State Senator, Earl Goodwin, who had represented Eutaw until redistricted into a new seat in 1983. Goodwin relented in summer 1984 after a group of 200 Black Eutawans, led by the SCLC leader and Reverend Joseph Lowery, marched on city hall in protest of the filibuster. During the protest march, Rev. Lowery declared that Eutaw was "a segregated island in an integrated sea". Ultimately, a county referendum allowing the annexation passed and Black citizens finally won election to the city council in the next election. However, the Reagan Justice Department launched a voter fraud probe in Greene County shortly after these elections, leading to the conviction of Spiver Gordon by an all-White jury for allegedly violating absentee voting rules. Gordon had been a long time Eutaw civil rights activist, and was one of the Black leaders elected to the city council in 1984. With the help of John England Jr, one of the University of Alabama Law School's first Black graduates, Gordon sued to overturn his conviction. In 1988, the 11th Circuit Court of Appeals vacated and reversed his conviction.

Agriculture continues to dominate the county's economy. Now conducted on an industrial scale, it has reduced the need for farm workers. Unemployment is high in the rural county.

James Bevel, the main strategist and architect of the Civil Rights Movement, was buried in Ancestors Village Cemetery in Eutaw on December 29, 2008. In addition to his early work in the Nashville Student Movement and Mississippi movement, Bevel initiated, planned, and directed the strategies for the 1963 Birmingham Children's Crusade, the 1965 Selma to Montgomery march, and the 1966 Chicago Open Housing Movement.

Eutaw is home to the Roman Catholic Convent of Our Lady of Consolata, the Consolata Sisters, a small monastery for nuns in West Alabama. They are known throughout Greene County for their humanitarian efforts.

== Geography ==
Eutaw is located east of the center of Greene County. U.S. Routes 11 and 43 pass through the center of town. The highways enter together from the northeast as Tuscaloosa Street; US 11 exits the city to the west as Boligee Street, while US 43 leaves to the south as Demopolis Highway. Alabama State Route 14 passes through the city as Greensboro Street to the southeast and Mesopotamia Street to the northwest. Interstates 20 and 59 run through the northwest corner of the city, with access from Exit 40 (Highway 14), 3 miles (5 km) northwest of the center of town. Tuscaloosa is 34 miles (55 km) to the northeast via Interstate 20/59, and Meridian, Mississippi, is 60 miles (97 km) to the southwest. Demopolis is 24 miles (39 km) south via US 43, Greensboro is 21 miles (34 km) to the southeast via Highway 14, and Aliceville is 27 miles (43 km) to the northwest via Highway 14.

According to the U.S. Census Bureau, Eutaw has a total area of 12.0 square miles (31.1 km^{2}), of which 0.1 sq mi (0.2 km^{2}), or 0.63%, is covered by water. The center of town is 3 mi (5 km) west of the Black Warrior River, accessible to boats at Finches Ferry Public Use Area.

=== Climate ===
The climate in this area is characterized by hot, humid summers and generally mild to cool winters. According to the Köppen climate classification, Eutaw has a humid subtropical climate, Cfa on climate maps.

Climate data for Eutaw, 1991–2020 simulated normals (187 ft elevation)
Month	Jan	Feb	Mar	Apr	May	Jun	Jul	Aug	Sep	Oct	Nov	Dec	Year
Mean daily maximum °F (°C)	55.9 (13.3)	60.3 (15.7)	68.5 (20.3)	75.6 (24.2)	82.9 (28.3)	89.1 (31.7)	91.6 (33.1)	91.4 (33.0)	87.1 (30.6)	77.4 (25.2)	66.2 (19.0)	58.1 (14.5)	75.3 (24.1)
Daily mean °F (°C)	45.1 (7.3)	49.1 (9.5)	56.3 (13.5)	63.5 (17.5)	71.8 (22.1)	78.6 (25.9)	81.5 (27.5)	81.0 (27.2)	75.9 (24.4)	65.1 (18.4)	54.0 (12.2)	47.5 (8.6)	64.1 (17.8)
Mean daily minimum °F (°C)	34.5 (1.4)	37.8 (3.2)	43.9 (6.6)	51.4 (10.8)	60.6 (15.9)	68.0 (20.0)	71.4 (21.9)	70.5 (21.4)	64.8 (18.2)	52.9 (11.6)	41.7 (5.4)	37.0 (2.8)	52.9 (11.6)
Average precipitation inches (mm)	5.55 (141.03)	5.54 (140.75)	5.50 (139.74)	5.13 (130.26)	3.99 (101.30)	4.42 (112.27)	5.11 (129.90)	4.65 (118.20)	3.75 (95.23)	3.32 (84.45)	4.38 (111.31)	5.27 (133.76)	56.61 (1,438.2)
Average dew point °F (°C)	36.3 (2.4)	39.2 (4.0)	44.4 (6.9)	52.2 (11.2)	61.0 (16.1)	68.2 (20.1)	71.2 (21.8)	70.5 (21.4)	65.5 (18.6)	55.0 (12.8)	44.8 (7.1)	39.7 (4.3)	54.0 (12.2)
Source: PRISM Climate Group

== Demographics ==
Historical population
Census	Pop.	Note	%±
1850	2,000		—
1880	1,101		—
1890	1,115		1.3%
1900	884		−20.7%
1910	1,001		13.2%
1920	1,359		35.8%
1930	1,721		26.6%
1940	1,895		10.1%
1950	2,348		23.9%
1960	2,784		18.6%
1970	2,805		0.8%
1980	2,444		−12.9%
1990	2,281		−6.7%
2000	1,878		−17.7%
2010	2,934		56.2%
2020	2,937		0.1%
U.S. Decennial Census; 2013 Estimate

=== Racial and ethnic composition ===
Eutaw city, Alabama – Racial and ethnic composition Note: the US Census treats Hispanic/Latino as an ethnic category. This table excludes Latinos from the racial categories and assigns them to a separate category. Hispanics/Latinos may be of any race. Race and ethnicity was not surveyed for populations under 2,500 in the 1980 census and under 1,000 in 1990 census.
Race / Ethnicity (NH = Non-Hispanic)	Pop 1990	Pop 2000	Pop 2010	Pop 2020	% 1990	% 2000	% 2010	% 2020
White alone (NH)	868	620	519	447	38.05%	33.01%	17.69%	15.22%
Black or African American alone (NH)	1,411	1,233	2,346	2,408	61.86%	65.65%	79.96%	81.99%
Native American or Alaska Native alone (NH)	0	5	3	2	0.00%	0.27%	0.10%	0.07%
Asian alone (NH)	0	4	13	5	0.00%	0.21%	0.44%	0.17%
Native Hawaiian or Pacific Islander alone (NH)	x	0	0	0	x	0.00%	0.00%	0.00%
Other race alone (NH)	0	0	0	3	0.00%	0.00%	0.00%	0.10%
Mixed race or Multiracial (NH)	x	9	16	45	x	0.48%	0.55%	1.53%
Hispanic or Latino (any race)	2	7	37	27	0.09%	0.37%	1.26%	0.92%
Total	2,281	1,878	2,934	2,937	100.00%	100.00%	100.00%	100.00%

=== 2020 census ===
As of the 2020 United States census, 2,937 people, 1,041 households, and 551 families resided in the town.

=== 2010 census ===
At the 2010 census there were 2,934 people in 1,203 households, including 760 families, in the city. The population density was 408.3 inhabitants per square mile (157.6/km^{2}). The 1,355 housing units had an average density of 294.6 per square mile (113.7/km^{2}). The racial makeup of the city was 80.2% Black or African American, 18.1% White, 0.1% Native American, 0.4% Asian, and 0.6% from two or more races. About 1.3% of the population was Hispanic or Latino of any race. Of the 1,203 households, 25.6% had children under 18 living with them, 30.8% were married couples living together, 28.4% had a female householder with no husband present, and 36.8% were not families; 34.2% of households were one person and 15.5% were one person aged 65 or older. The average household size was 2.40 and the average family size was 3.10.

The age distribution was 25.8% under 18, 9.2% from 18 to 24, 19.8% from 25 to 44, 28.4% from 45 to 64, and 16.8% 65 or older. The median age was 39 years. For every 100 females, there were 82.7 males. For every 100 females 18 and over, there were 77.5 males.

The median household income was $29,196 and the median family income was $39,722. Males had a median income of $43,125 versus $28,077 for females. The per capita income for the city was $14,126. About 27.4% of families and 28.7% of the population were below the poverty line, including 38.7% of those under 18 and 17.0% of those 65 or over.

The surprising population growth of 56.2% or 1,056 people between 2000 and 2010 was caused by the annexation and incorporation of surrounding areas into Eutaw proper. This move brought the predominantly low-income and African-American communities of Branch Heights and King's Village into Eutaw's city limits. Proponents argued that this would allow Eutaw to regain its designation as a city (which it lost after the 2000 census) and help steer federal money into local infrastructure projects.

=== 2000 census ===
At the 2000 census, 1,878 people lived in 778 households, including 504 families, in the city. The population density was 411.1 inhabitants per square mile (158.7/km^{2}). The 899 housing units had an average density of 196.8 per square mile (76.0/km^{2}). The racial makeup of the city was 33.01% White, 66.03% Black or African American, 0.27% Native American, 0.21% Asian, and 0.48% from two or more races. About 0.37% of the population was Hispanic or Latino of any race. Of the 778 households, 24.7% had children under18 living with them, 39.5% were married couples living together, 21.5% had a female householder with no husband present, and 35.1% were not families. About 33.5% of households were one person and 15.4% were one person 65 or older. The average household size was 2.31 and the average family size was 2.95.

The age distribution was 22.4% under 18, 8.0% from 18 to 24, 22.6% from 25 to 44, 24.4% from 45 to 64, and 22.5% 65 or older. The median age was 43 years. For every 100 females, there were 84.8 males. For every 100 females 18 and over, there were 75.9 males.

The median household income was $23,056 and the median family income was $32,946. Males had a median income of $30,284 versus $18,869 for females. The per capita income for the city was $14,573. About 24.7% of families and 28.9% of the population were below the poverty line, including 39.4% of those under 18 and 22.5% of those 65 or over.

== Notable people ==
- Benjamin F. Alexander, state representative during the Reconstruction era
- Oliver H. Cross, U.S. representative from Texas
- Edward deGraffenried, U.S. Representative from Alabama's 6th congressional district
- Charles Hays, former U.S. Congressman for the 4th District of Alabama
- Cob Jarvis, basketball player and head basketball coach for the University of Mississippi
- Bill Lee, professional football player
- Matthew Leonard, Sergeant First Class, posthumously received the Medal of Honor for his actions in the Vietnam War.
- James McQueen, president of Sloss-Sheffield Steel and Iron Company
- Willie Powell, baseball pitcher in the Negro leagues
- Bo Scarbrough, professional football player
- Margaret Charles Smith, midwife and member of the Alabama Women's Hall of Fame
- John Szwed, renowned cultural and musical historian, Professor Emeritus at Yale and Columbia

== See also ==
- National Register of Historic Places listings in Greene County, Alabama
