= Properties on the Alabama Register of Landmarks and Heritage by county (DeKalb–Jackson) =

This is a list of properties on the Alabama Register of Landmarks and Heritage, sorted alphabetically by county. This list contains all entries for DeKalb County through Jackson County, the other listings may be found here. The Alabama Register of Landmarks and Heritage is an official listing of buildings, sites, structures, objects, and districts deemed worthy of preservation in the U.S. state of Alabama.

These properties, which may be of national, state, and local significance, are designated by the Alabama Historical Commission, under the authority of the Alabama Legislature. General criteria for inclusion in the Alabama Register includes that the property is at least 40 years old; is associated with events of state or local significance; is associated with the lives of persons of state or local significance; is representative of a type, style, or period of architecture; or is associated with Alabama's history or prehistory. It must also possess integrity of location and construction and convey a feeling for the time and place of construction.

The Alabama Register occasionally includes properties that do not meet the general criteria for inclusion, such as moved or reconstructed structures. These properties are included when they have been sensitively relocated to a site similar to the original, closely match the construction of the original significant building, or are of exceptional importance to the state.

There are approximately 1,711 properties and districts listed on the Alabama Register. Of these, approximately 243 are also listed on the National Register of Historic Places (NRHP) and 6 are designated as National Historic Landmarks (NHL).

DeKalb – Elmore – Escambia – Etowah – Fayette – Franklin – Geneva – Greene – Hale – Henry – Houston – Jackson – See also – References

This list is complete through the most recent Alabama Historical Commission listings, posted January 8, 2025.

== DeKalb County ==
	Site name	Date listed	City or Town	Built or Established	NRHP/NHL
1	Anderson-Porter House	July 28, 1978	Fort Payne	c. 1889	
2	Berry House	June 27, 2019	Mentone	c. 1900	
3	Buckles Homestead-Abbot Place	November 16, 2024	Fort Payne	c. 1927, 1947	
4	Buell-Green House	July 28, 1978	Fort Payne	c. 1889	
5	Cherokee (Ross-Godfrey-Kershaw-Brewer House)	July 16, 1976	Fort Payne	c. 1790	NRHP
6	Cochran-Wilson-Owen Estate	April 4, 1986	Fort Payne	c. 1890	
7	Collinsville Presbyterian Church	July 27, 1976	Collinsville	c. 1908	
8	Council Bluff School	August 5, 1976	Valley Head vicinity	c. 1903	
9	Davenport House (A. C. Spaulding Residence)	July 6, 1978	Fort Payne	c. 1890	
10	W.B. Davis Hosiery Mill	July 19, 1976	Fort Payne	c. 1889	NRHP
11	DeKalb Theatre	November 16, 2024	Fort Payne	c. 1920	
12	Deer Head Cove Church (Deer Head Cove School)	April 16, 1985	Cartersville	c. 1908	
13	Dr. P.B. Green Home	December 10, 2020		c. 1890	
14	First Presbyterian Church	August 14, 1975	Fort Payne	c. 1888	
15	Fort Payne City Park	January 13, 1978	Fort Payne	c. 1889	
16	Fort Payne-DeKalb Hosiery Mill	June 16, 1976	Fort Payne	c. 1930	
17	Hawkins Place	August 27, 2020	Henagar	1948; 1951	
18	Edna Hill Methodist Church	August 4, 1978	Desoto State Park	c. 1907	
19	Howard's Chapel (Salley Howard Memorial Baptist Church)	July 9, 1976	Mentone	c. 1934	
20	Isbell-Beck House	August 2, 1979	Fort Payne	c. 1924	
21	Killian-Appleton-Cochran House	September 6, 1984	Fort Payne	c. 1914	
22	Killian Residence	September 28, 1978	Fort Payne	c. 1927	
23	Landstreet Home	August 4, 1978	Fort Payne	c. 1850	
24	J.C. Larmore Home (T.J. Larmore Home)	July 28, 1978	Valley Head	c. 1880	
25	V.C. Larmore Home	January 31, 1979	Valley Head	c. 1845	NRHP
26	Leath House	July 29, 1976	Fort Payne	c. 1889	
27	Lebanon Methodist Church	September 16, 2021	Fort Payne	c. 1852	
28	Magnolia Hall	February 6, 1978	Fort Payne	c. 1890	
29	Malone-Leath House	August 4, 1978	Fort Payne	c. 1890	
30	Manitou Cave	August 6, 1976	Fort Payne		
31	McNew Cemetery	June 19, 1997	Fort Payne	c. 1867	
32	Mentone	July 23, 1976	Mentone	c. 1870	
33	Mentone Inn (Hal's Hotel/DeSoto Lodge)	September 4, 1984	Mentone	c. 1927	
34	McCurdy House (burned in late 1980s)	July 28, 1978	Rainsville	c. 1931	
35	McWhorter-Killian House	August 4, 1978	Collinsville	c. 1904	
36	Moon Lake Club	April 1, 2010	Mentone	1945	
37	D.W. "Dock" Powell Place	August 4, 1978	Fyffe	c. 1903	
38	Rockymount Cemetery	October 7, 1998	Collinsville		
39	Sawyer Building	May 9, 1978	Fort Payne	c. 1878	
40	Sawyer House	April 14, 1978	Fort Payne	c. 1878	
41	Taft-Borders Cabin (Taft House)	July 21, 1978	Fort Payne	c. 1837	
42	Taylor House	July 21, 1978	Fort Payne	c. 1895	
43	Taylor's Emporium (Horton and Bryant General Store)	August 28, 1981	Geraldine	c. 1923	
44	The Oaks	July 21, 1976	Fort Payne	c. 1884	
45	Valley Head United Methodist Church	September 26, 2007	Valley Head	c. 1917–1949	
46	Ward-Elrod Home	August 28, 1981	Collinsville	c. 1918	
47	Willbanks-McReynolds House	August 4, 1978	Collinsville	c. 1908	
48	Windward Inn	August 28, 1981	Mentone	c. 1900	
49	Winston Place	August 3, 1976	Valley Head	c. 1835	NRHP
50	Woodland Cemetery	February 25, 1999	Fort Payne	c. 1890	

== Elmore County ==
	Site name	Date listed	City or Town	Built or Established	NRHP/NHL
1	Florence Bateman House	June 15, 1977	Wetumpka	c. 1842	
2	Francis Beaulieu House	March 30, 1977	Wetumpka	c. 1816	
3	Bibb-Graves Bridge	February 25, 1977	Wetumpka	c. 1931	
4	William Wyatt Bibb Gravesite	November 5, 1976	Coosada	1820	
5	Billingsley Home and Windmill	November 4, 1977	Tallassee	c. 1930	
6	Busch Log Cabin	March 22, 1991	Wetumpka	1935	
7	Cain's Chapel United Methodist Church and Cemetery	October 25, 2018	Holtville	1953	
8	Confederate Arsenal House (Elliott House)	August 1, 1977	Tallassee	c. 1864	
9	Corn Dance Farm	November 30, 1977	Coosada	c. 1820	
10	Crommelin's Landing	March 27, 1977	Wetumpka	c. 1820	
11	W. D. Doby High School (Wetumpka Elementary School)	November 19, 2015	Wetumpka vicinity	c. 1963	
12	Edward Rock Dogtrot House (Rose-Morris House; moved to Old Alabama Town in 1987)	March 1, 1977	Wetumpka vicinity	c. 1830	
13	Ellerslie (Bowling Hall House)	June 30, 1995	Millbrook	1820	
14	Elmore County Courthouse	May 2, 1977	Wetumpka	c. 1931	
15	Elmore County Training School	March 7, 2002	Wetumpka	1924	
16	First Baptist Church	June 3, 1977	Wetumpka	c. 1846	NRHP
17	First United Methodist Church	June 26, 2003	Tallassee	1929	
18	Gantt Dogtrot House	April 8, 1977	Titus		
19	Hagerty-Turner-Yung House (Blue Hills)	September 30, 1999	Wetumpka	c. 1840–1860	NRHP
20	Harrogate Springs (Crommelin House)	March 30, 1977	Wetumpka vicinity	c. 1905	
21	Herron Hill	July 25, 1977	Tallassee	c. 1855	
22	Hickory Knoll	October 24, 1977	Elmore	c. 1892	
23	Holtville School (Holtville High School)	May 18, 1977	Holtville	c. 1929	
24	Hotel Talisi	July 28, 1977	Tallassee	c. 1929	
25	John Howle House	May 26, 1986	Wetumpka	c. 1904–1905	
26	Jasmine Hill Gardens	July 21, 1977	Wetumpka vicinity	c. 1820–1930	
27	Jordan Dam	November 5, 1976	Coosa River	c. 1927	
28	Lanark Plantation (Spring Hill)	September 20, 1977	Millbrook vicinity	c. 1820	
29	Ma Brown Dogtrot	April 30, 2020	Wetumpka	1881 (moved to current location in 1992)	
30	Martin Dam (Shared with Tallapoosa County)	January 5, 1976	Tallapoosa River		
31	McCowen House (Thomas Home)	November 30, 1977	Wetumpka	c. 1904–1905	
32	McMorris House	April 13, 1909	Wetumpka	c. 1905	
33	Museum of Music	January 25, 1977	Wetumpka		
34	Old Calaboose	January 27, 1976	Wetumpka	c. 1840	
35	Old Wetumpka Post Office	May 19, 1999	Wetumpka	1937	
36	Willam K. Oliver House	March 25, 2004	Titus vicinity	c. 1842	
37	Peterson and Peterson Store (Cowling General Store)	November 3, 1977	Elmore	c. 1900	
38	Robinson Springs Methodist Church	July 21, 1977	Millbrook vicinity	c. 1845	NRHP
39	Robinson Springs Methodist Parsonage	July 21, 1977	Millbrook vicinity	c. 1850	
40	Sandtown High School	August 5, 2010	Millbrook	1947	
41	Sewell Cabin	May 6, 2020	Wetumpka	c. 1870; moved in 1978	
42	Swayback Bridge	April 14, 1977	Wetumpka vicinity	c. 1931	
43	Tallassee Mill	January 18, 1978	Tallassee vicinity	c. 1841	NRHP
44	Tanglewood	March 24, 2005	Millbrook vicinity	c. 1823	
45	The Elms	August 15, 1983	Coosada	c. 1836	
46	Thornfield	August 25, 2011	Millbrook	c. 1824	
47	Titus Historic District	April 12, 1978	Titus	c. 1800s	
48	Tukabahchi	July 21, 1977	Tallassee vicinity	1686–1836	
49	Tuskeena Street District	July 29, 1977	Wetumpka	c. 1830–1906	
50	Tom Wall House (Taylor-Wall-Ingram House)	January 14, 1980	Wetumpka vicinity	c. 1830	
51	Wetumpka Lock (Lock 31)	August 3, 1977	Wetumpka	c. 1896	
52	Wetumpka Municipal Airport (Elmore Auxiliary Training Field #2)	February 21, 2013	Elmore	c. 1942	
53	Christian Wingard Home Place	June 30, 1995	Wetumpka	1937	

== Escambia County ==
	Site name	Date listed	City or Town	Built or Established	NRHP/NHL
1	Baptist Hill Missionary Baptist Church	December 19, 2019	Brewton	1945; 1972	
2	Damascus Travelers Well	June 23, 2016	Damascus	c. 1911	
3	Dooley Hall	November 13, 1978	Brewton	c. 1911	
4	Elmore Building	August 25, 1994	Brewton	1886–1915	
5	Escambia County Training School	June 23, 2016	Atmore	c. 1953	
6	Flomaton Hotel (Commercial Hotel) (demolished c. 2004)	April 11, 1984	Flomaton	c. 1906	NRHP
7	Fort Crawford	January 18, 1978	East Brewton	c. 1816	
8	Halls Creek Missionary Baptist Church and Cemetery	June 12, 2014	Brewton	c. 1947	
9	Horn-Eichold House	November 17, 1995	Atmore	1912	
10	Leigh House	March 11, 1976	Brewton	c. 1885	
11	Charles Lawrence Moore House and Cemetery (house demolished in 2020)	May 19, 1999	Atmore	c. 1883–1884	
12	Owen-Lufkin House	August 22, 1985	Atmore	c. 1906	
13	Porter-McLaren Home	July 7, 1980	Brewton	c. 1880	
14	Second Saint Siloam Missionary Baptist Church	April 1, 2010	Brewton	1910	
15	Southern Normal and Industrial Institute	March 12, 1997	Brewton	c. 1911	

== Etowah County ==
	Site name	Date listed	City or Town	Built or Established	NRHP/NHL
1	Myron K. Allenstein Law Office (Phillips-Action Home)	March 20, 1981	Gadsden	c. 1893–1899	
2	Argyle Historic District	June 19, 1996	Gadsden	1913–1960s	
3	Attalla Elementary School	August 6, 1993	Attalla	1935–1942	
4	Attalla Historic District	May 19, 2011	Attalla		NRHP
5	Bellenger Home (Charles Gunn House)	April 11, 1984	Gadsden	c. 1887	NRHP
6	Brannon Springs Methodist Church	September 25, 2008	Gadsden vicinity	c. 1900	
7	Elks Building	December 20, 1984	Gadsden	c. 1930	
8	Eugene N. Prater Administration Building	November 16, 2024	Gadsden	c. 1965	
9	Forrest Cemetery Chapel	May 23, 1988	Gadsden	c. 1935–1936	NRHP
10	Gadsden Times-News Building	February 11, 1982	Gadsden	c. 1904	NRHP
11	Gadsden High School	December 19, 2019	Gadsden	1941 & 1972	
12	Galilee Baptist Church	October 21, 2016	Gadsden	c. 1960s	
13	Garner Cemetery	February 27, 1978	Gadsden	c. 1840	
14	Goodyear Tire and Rubber Company	November 26, 1975	Gadsden	Built 1928	
15	Haralson Historic District	June 19, 1996	Gadsden	1890s–1960s	
16	Colonel Hood Home (Gadsden Woman's Club)	April 16, 1985	Gadsden	c. 1902–1904	NRHP
17	Hoyt Warsham Alabama City Public Library	December 16, 2010	Gadsden	c. 1920	
18	Hughes-Robinson House	May 22, 2008	Gadsden	c. 1910	
19	Robert Stewart Keener Home	August 25, 2011	Keener	c. 1894	
20	Keener Voting House	April 18, 2007	Keener	c. 1932	
21	L & N Railroad Freight Depot (demolished)	May 5, 1978	Gadsden	c. 1871	
22	Macedonia Methodist Church	October 19, 1979	Ridgeville	c. 1906	
23	Hubert & Ive Moore House	March 29, 2012	Gallant	c. 1940	
24	Old Keener House & Barn	May 19, 2011	Attalla	c. 1850s	
25	Pioneer Homestead-Noccalula Falls Park	May 12, 1976	Gadsden	c. 1777	
26	Robinson House	May 22, 2008	Gadsden	c. 1920	NRHP
27	Seven Cedars	April 11, 1984	Attalla	c. 1870	
28	Sizemore House	October 31, 2013	Keener	c. 1842	
29	Tumlin Gap Tunnel and Trestle	May 10, 2000	Altoona	c. 1880s	
30	Turrentine Historic District	March 8, 1994	Gadsden	1900–1916	NRHP
31	Union Baptist Church	December 10, 2020	Gadsden	c. 1956	
32	White-Erwin Farm (Three Oaks)	September 6, 1984	Gadsden	c. 1900	
33	Willis Estates (demolished)	September 25, 2008	Attalla	c. 1923	

== Fayette County ==
	Site name	Date listed	City or Town	Built or Established	NRHP/NHL
1	Fayette County Courthouse District	November 26, 1975	Fayette	c. 1911–1955	NRHP
2	Freeman Lake	August 24, 2022	Fayette	1960	
3	Thomas Posey McConnel Home (moved to a location near Eldridge)	May 12, 1976	Fayette	c. 1888	
4	Theron Cannon and Company (Destroyed by tornado, April 2011)	April 1, 2010	Berry	1905	
5	Shady Grove Baptist Church and Cemetery		Fayette	1917 (cemetery); 1968; 2001 (church)	
6	United States Post Office	June 24, 2004	Fayette	1936	

== Franklin County ==
	Site name	Date listed	City or Town	Built or Established	NRHP/NHL
1	A.T. Bonds House	August 25, 1975	Pleasant Grove vicinity	Antebellum	
2	Clayton-Hester House	December 29, 1975	Frankfort vicinity	c. 1888	
3	Major Jesse Counts House	April 11, 1984	Russellville vicinity	c. 1835	
4	Duncan House	November 23, 1976	Russellville vicinity	c. 1900	
5	Five-Oaks Springs (Spring of the Five Oaks)	April 29, 1977	Russellville	c. 1817	
6	Hulsey-South House	April 11, 1984	Russellville vicinity	c. 1876	
7	Kirkwood	September 30, 1999	Russellville	c. 1830	
8	Malone House	January 27, 1976	Frankfort	c. 1820	
9	McIntosh House	October 7, 1998	Russellville	c. 1901	
10	Mount Pleasant Church	April 11, 1984	Russellville vicinity	c. 1900	
11	Newburg Masonic Lodge	November 17, 1995	Russellville vicinity	1878	
12	Old Clarks Department Store	January 24, 2008	Russellville	c. 1900	
13	Reedtown High School	February 21, 2013	Russellville	c. 1952	
14	Major William Russell Gravesite (Hurley Cemetery)	March 19, 1993	Russellville vicinity	1825	

== Geneva County ==
	Site name	Date listed	City or Town	Built or Established	NRHP/NHL
1	Black House (demolished)	June 27, 2007	Geneva	1908	
2	Emma Knox Kenan Library (Geneva Public Library)	February 25, 1985	Geneva	c. 1931	
3	Finks Mill	November 26, 1975	Florala vicinity	c. 1932	
4	Geneva Depot (demolished)	April 29, 1977	Geneva	c. 1901	
5	Kenan Home	February 21, 2019	Florala vicinity	1887	

== Greene County ==
	Site name	Date listed	City or Town	Built or Established	NRHP/NHL
1	Wilkes Banks House	November 5, 1976	Eutaw	1848	
2	Bethsalem Presbyterian Church	August 12, 1976	Boligee	c. 1835	
3	Braune-Inge-Beeker House	October 12, 1976	Eutaw	c. 1860	NRHP
4	Brugh House	October 17, 1980	Eutaw	c. 1900	
5	Carpenter-Rudd House	December 21, 1977	Eutaw vicinity	c. 1853	NRHP
6	Colvin Plantation Home	June 27, 2019	Eutaw	c. 1832	
7	Concord Baptist Church (Clinton Baptist Church)	June 19, 1996	Eutaw vicinity	1857	
8	Hale-Jarvis-Trotter House	November 30, 1977	Eutaw	1842	NRHP
9	Hardy Homeplace	March 1, 2018	West Greene	c. 1886	
10	Dr. M.L. Malloy House (Rosemont)	September 30, 1999	Eutaw	c. 1906	
11	Murphy Dunlap House	November 5, 1976	Eutaw	1844	NRHP
12	Owens-Hutton Home	October 12, 1976	Pleasant Ridge	Late 1940s	
13	Perkins-Browder House	October 17, 1980	Eutaw	1850s	NRHP
14	Pippen Plantation	October 11, 1978	Eutaw	1850s	NRHP
15	Pleasant Ridge Presbyterian Church and Cemetery	October 31, 2013	Eutaw	c. 1859	
16	Reese-Phillips House	October 17, 1980	Eutaw	1856	NRHP
17	St. Mark's Episcopal Church and Cemetery	March 20, 2003	Boligee	c. 1852, Moved 1880	
18	Sipsey	October 19, 1979	Eutaw	1835	NRHP

== Hale County ==
	Site name	Date listed	City or Town	Built or Established	NRHP/NHL
1	Harris Homestead	September 20, 2006	Havana vicinity	c. 1900	
2	Alfred Hatch House (Holbrook Residence/Elm Ridge Plantation)	November 2, 1990	Greensboro	1840s	NRHP
3	Havana Methodist Church and Cemetery	October 31, 2013	Havana	c. 1880	
4	Morland-Crawford House	October 31, 2013	Havana	c. 1904	
5	Newbern Village Historic District	November 26, 1975	Newbern	Antebellum	
6	Salem Baptist Church	July 29, 1992	Greensboro	c. 1895–1910	
7	Oak Grove Missionary Baptist Church	September 28, 2000	Gallion	Mid–1870s	
8	Williams Place (Reubern Seay Home)	December 21, 1977	Greensboro	c. 1939	
9	Morrison House	December 21, 1977	Greensboro	c. 1839	
10	St. James Presbyterian Church	May 13, 2024	Moundville	c. 1910	
11	St. Matthews A.M.E. Church	October 31, 1975	Greensboro	1861	
12	The President's House	July 29, 1992	Greensboro	c. 1860	
13	Webb House	October 31, 2013	Havana	c. 1920	

== Henry County ==
	Site name	Date listed	City or Town	Built or Established	NRHP/NHL
1	Abbie Creek Bridge	June 16, 1976	Haleburg vicinity	c. 1930	
2	Buckner Family Home	August 27, 2020	Headland	1948	
3	Burdeshaw Falkner Home and Mule Barn	November 16, 2024	Ashford	c. 1910	
4	Edwin Community Clubhouse	September 28, 2000	Clopton	Late 1930s	
5	Kennedy House	July 19, 1976	Abbeville	1866	NRHP
6	Mount Zion Baptist Church	April 16, 1985	Columbia	c. 1871	
7	New Maranda Baptist Church & Cemetery	August 12, 2019	Dothan	1945	
8	Old Methodist Parsonage (Dow-Parsonage) (demolished)	April 16, 1985	Abbeville	c. 1880	
9	Trawick-Pinkerton House	July 6, 1978	Abbeville	1869	
10	Wright's Chapel Cemetery and Church Site	December 19, 1991	Abbeville	1822–1824	

== Houston County ==
	Site name	Date listed	City or Town	Built or Established	NRHP/NHL
1	Alabama Midland Depot	January 25, 1977	Ashford	c. 1892	NRHP
2	Atlantic Coastline Railroad Depot	August 3, 1990	Dothan	1908	NRHP
3	Brown's Crossroad Schoolhouse	December 10, 2020	Dothan	1898; Moved 1991	
4	Columbia Jail	October 27, 1975	Columbia	c. 1862	
5	Dexter and Main Street Historic District	December 16, 2010	Webb	c. 1903–1960	
6	Dothan Municipal Light and Water Plant	March 23, 1990	Dothan	1912–1913	NRHP
7	Express Car and Business Car No. 502 (demolished)	March 20, 1981	Dothan	1885–1974	
8	First Missionary Baptist Church	May 3, 2001	Dothan	1912	
9	George Washington Carver High School (demolished 2005)	2002	Dothan	c. 1921	
10	Ivey Family Home	December 15, 2011	Webb	c. 1904	
11	Old Bank of Columbia	September 16, 2021	Columbia	c. 1915	NRHP
12	Murphy's Grist Mill (demolished)	June 16, 1976	Dothan vicinity	c. 1906	
13	NBCAR Historic District (Newton, Burdeshaw, Cherry, Adams, and Range Streets)	May 3, 2001	Dothan	Earliest c. 1910	
14	Pilgrim Rest Baptist Church East and Cemetery	March 20, 2003	Gordon vicinity	1911	
15	St. John Missionary Baptist Church	April 11, 2024	Gordon	c. 1940	
16	Wilson Windmill	April 19, 2006	Dothan	c. 1930	

== Jackson County ==
	Site name	Date listed	City or Town	Built or Established	NRHP/NHL
1	B.B. Comer Memorial Bridge	October 13, 2013	Scottsboro	1929–30	
2	Bridgeport Depot	September 15, 1975	Bridgeport	1917	
3	Brown-Proctor House	February 4, 1981	Scottsboro	1881	NRHP
4	Caperton Farm Complex	March 24, 2022	Flat Rock	c. 1860; c. 1940; c. 1950	
5	Captain Jackson-Bottomlee House	April 18, 2007	Langston	c. 1885	
6	College Hill Historic District	February 19, 1982	Scottsboro	1890–1970	NRHP
7	Doran's Cove Church and Cemetery	April 16, 1985	Bridgeport vicinity	c. 1840–1850	
8	Doran House	October 11, 1978	Bridgeport vicinity	c. 1816	
9	Elred W. Foshee House	April 1, 2010	Rash	c. 1831–1860	
10	Kilpatrick-Hughes House	January 31, 1979	Bridgeport	c. 1891, 1925	
11	Maples House	November 23, 1976	Scottsboro	c. 1860	
12	McGuffey Store	December 15, 2011	Fackler	c. 1915	
13	Scottsboro MRA (24 properties)	February 19, 1982	Scottsboro		
14	Scottsboro Public Square Historic District	June 29, 1981	Scottsboro	1870–1930	NRHP
15	Shelton-Jones House	May 10, 2000	Scottsboro	1907	
16	Skyline Cotton Gin	May 28, 2009	Skyline	c. 1935	
17	Skyline Farms Store	January 22, 2009	Skyline	1935	NRHP
18	Skyline Hosiery Mill	May 28, 2009	Skyline	1938	
19	Skyline School	October 7, 1998	Skyline	c. 1936	
20	Skyline Warehouse	May 28, 2009	Skyline	c. 1935	
21	Spivey-Adams House	February 19, 1982	Scottsboro	c. 1924	
22	Stevenson Depot	September 15, 1975	Stevenson	1872	NRHP
23	Terry Francis House	May 13, 2024	Stevenson	c. 1835	
24	Whitcher-Denton House	October 11, 1978	Bridgeport	1891–1892	

== See also ==
- Properties on the Alabama Register of Landmarks and Heritage by county (Autauga–Choctaw)
- Properties on the Alabama Register of Landmarks and Heritage by county (Clarke–Dallas)
- Properties on the Alabama Register of Landmarks and Heritage by county (Jefferson–Macon)
- Properties on the Alabama Register of Landmarks and Heritage by county (Madison–Perry)
- Properties on the Alabama Register of Landmarks and Heritage by county (Pickens–Winston)
