= Tallassee =

Tallassee may refer to the following places in the United States:

- Tallassee, Alabama
  - Tallassee Airport
  - Tallassee Armory, originally a cotton mill, converted into a C.S. arms manufacturing
- Tallassee, Tennessee
- Tallassee (Cherokee town), Tennessee, a prehistoric and historic Native American site

== See also ==
- Tallahassee
