= John Lovelace =

John Lovelace may refer to:

- John Lovelace (died 1558), MP for Reading (UK Parliament constituency)
- John Lovelace, 2nd Baron Lovelace (1616–1670)
- John Lovelace, 3rd Baron Lovelace (c. 1640–1693)
- John Lovelace, 4th Baron Lovelace (d. May 6, 1709), Governor of the Province of New Jersey
- John Lovelace, 5th Baron Lovelace (d. May 1709), Baron Lovelace
- Jonathan Bell Lovelace of Capital Group Companies
- John Lovelace, Jr. of Capital Group Companies
