= Brewton, Alabama =

City in and county seat of Escambia County, Alabama

- City
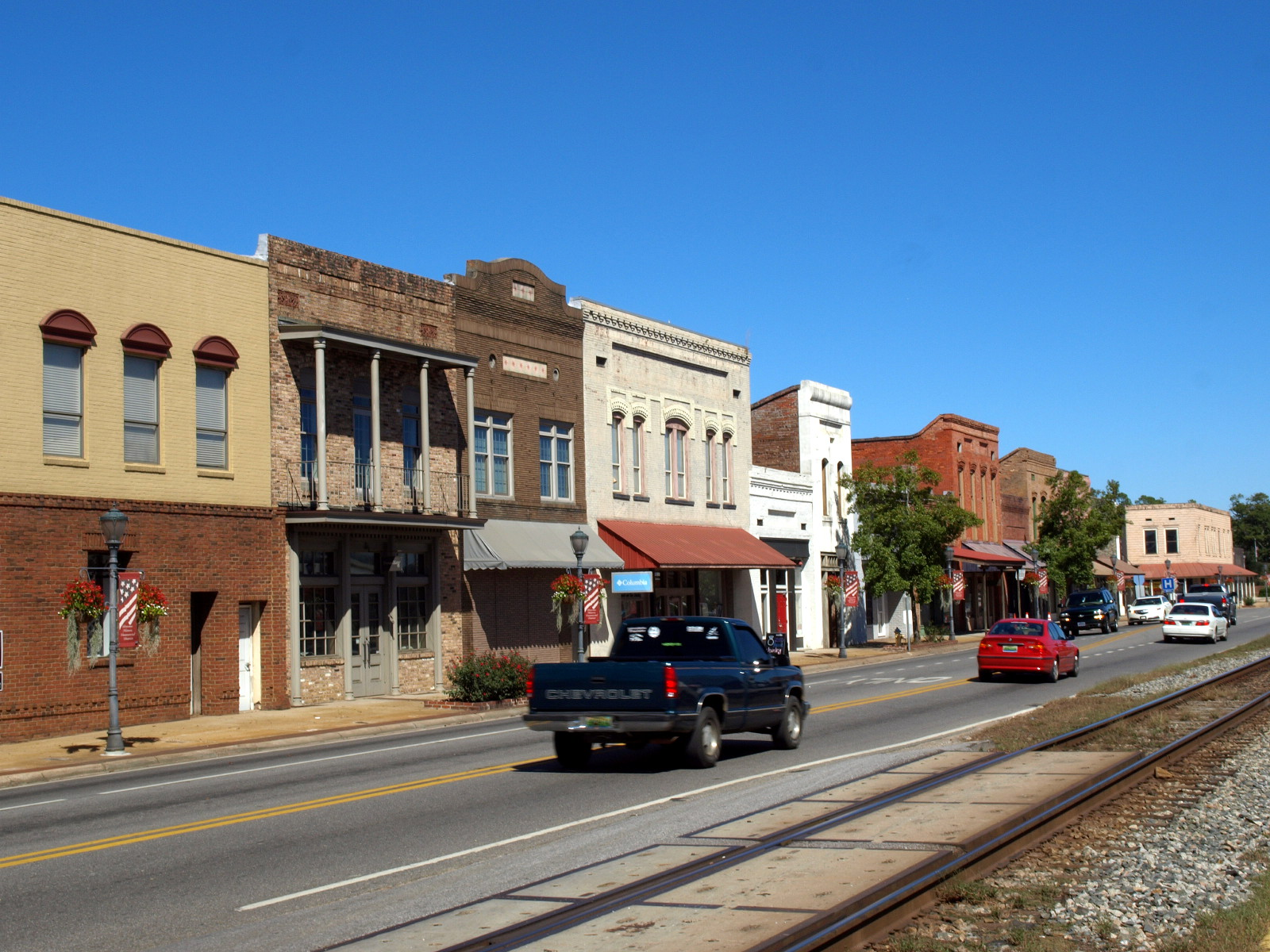
- Brewton Commercial Historic District

- Flag Seal

- Location of Brewton in Escambia County, Alabama
- Coordinates: 31°7′3″N 87°4′16″W
- Country: United States
- State: Alabama
- County: Escambia

Area
  - Total: 11.53 sq mi (29.87 km^{2})
  - Land: 11.30 sq mi (29.26 km^{2})
  - Water: 0.24 sq mi (0.61 km^{2})
- Elevation: 82 ft (25 m)

Population (2020)
  - Total: 5,276
  - Density: 467.1/sq mi (180.33/km^{2})
- Time zone: UTC−6 (Central (CST))
  - Summer (DST): UTC−5 (CDT)
- ZIP Code: 36426-36427
- Area code: 251
- FIPS code: 01-09208
- GNIS feature ID: 0157900
- Website: cityofbrewton.org

Brewton is a city in and the county seat of Escambia County, Alabama, United States. As of the 2020 census, the 2020 population was 5,276. Brewton is located in south central Alabama, just north of the Florida Panhandle.

Brewton was home to the Downing Industrial School, a school for girls. Brewton was ranked as one of the 100 best small towns in America in Norman Crampton's book, The 100 Best Small Towns in America (1995).

== History ==
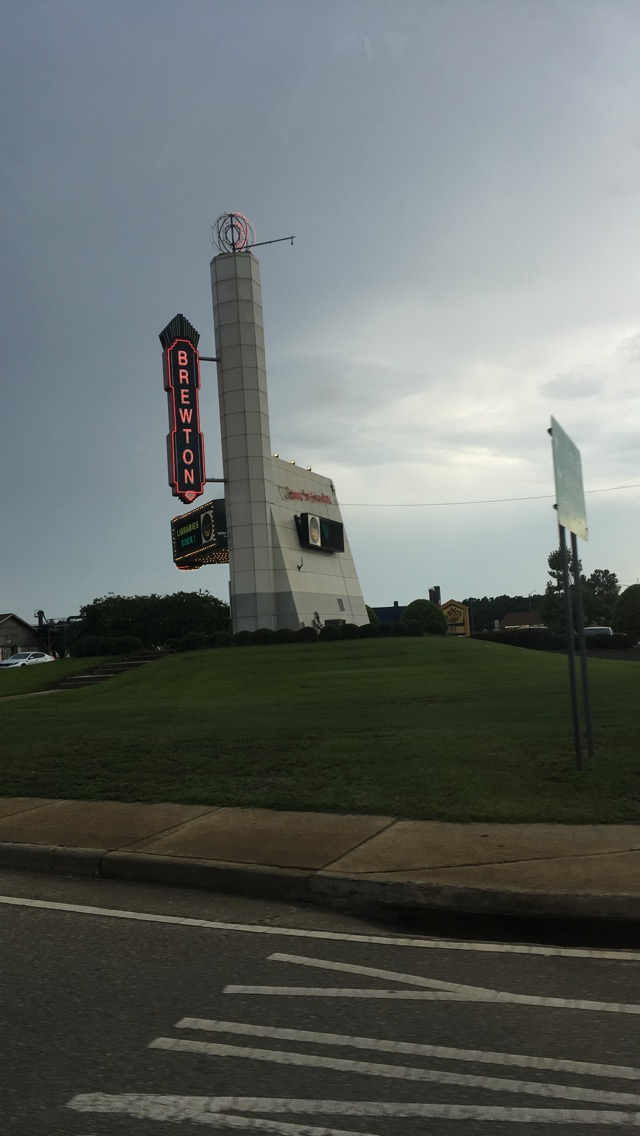
Sign for Brewton on State Route 41

The settlement at this site was originally known as Newport; barges made runs to and from Pensacola, Florida on Murder Creek and Burnt Corn Creek, before the railroad was constructed. In May 1861, Brewton was established as a train stop by Edmund Troupe Bruton. The area's lumber began to be harvested by industrialists.

During the Civil War, rail lines were severed, and small lumber mills were damaged or destroyed. After the war, the people rebuilt the Brewton economy, began a school, and established small businesses. Into the 1870s a new European demand for lumber stimulated the founding of numerous timber and lumber operations. The Conecuh-Escambia river system became a timber artery to ports on the Gulf of Mexico.

Brewton was established as a town on February 13, 1885. The state legislature designated the town as the seat of Escambia County, Alabama.

Brewton was known in past times as "the richest little town in the South." Brewton's high per capita income was based on the profits enjoyed by a small number of "timber barons." They had come at the end of the 19th century to harvest the pine forests. With their profits, they had extraordinary homes built along Belleville and Evergreen avenues. Such families include the McMillans, Lovelace and the Millers, many of whose descendants still reside in the town.

Over time the county erected a series of courthouses. Brewton developed an education system that included public and private institutions, including T. R. Miller High School. It was named for Thomas Richard Miller, a local timber baron and town father who donated money toward the building and opening of the school. Jefferson Davis Community College was established here in 1964; it has been renamed as Coastal Alabama Community College Brewton.

== Geography ==
According to the U.S. Census Bureau, the city has a total area of 11.5 square miles (30 km^{2}), of which 11.3 square miles (29 km^{2}) is land and 0.1 square miles (0.26 km^{2}) (1.22%) is water.

=== Climate ===
Climate is characterized by relatively high temperatures and evenly distributed precipitation throughout the year. The Köppen Climate Classification sub-type for this climate is "Cfa" (Humid Subtropical Climate). The hottest temperature ever recorded in the city was 109 °F (43 °C) on June 18, 1933, and the coldest temperature ever recorded was 3 °F (−16 °C) on January 21, 1985.

Climate data for Brewton, Alabama, 1991–2020 normals, extremes 1926–2014
Month	Jan	Feb	Mar	Apr	May	Jun	Jul	Aug	Sep	Oct	Nov	Dec	Year
Record high °F (°C)	87 (31)	87 (31)	91 (33)	95 (35)	100 (38)	109 (43)	106 (41)	104 (40)	102 (39)	98 (37)	89 (32)	84 (29)	109 (43)
Mean maximum °F (°C)	76.7 (24.8)	78.8 (26.0)	84.2 (29.0)	87.6 (30.9)	92.0 (33.3)	95.5 (35.3)	96.6 (35.9)	96.2 (35.7)	93.4 (34.1)	89.0 (31.7)	82.9 (28.3)	78.7 (25.9)	98.4 (36.9)
Mean daily maximum °F (°C)	62.7 (17.1)	66.4 (19.1)	73.8 (23.2)	79.5 (26.4)	86.2 (30.1)	91.0 (32.8)	92.4 (33.6)	92.1 (33.4)	88.9 (31.6)	80.8 (27.1)	71.2 (21.8)	64.4 (18.0)	79.1 (26.2)
Daily mean °F (°C)	50.9 (10.5)	54.0 (12.2)	60.5 (15.8)	66.3 (19.1)	74.2 (23.4)	80.3 (26.8)	82.4 (28.0)	82.1 (27.8)	77.9 (25.5)	68.1 (20.1)	57.8 (14.3)	52.7 (11.5)	67.3 (19.6)
Mean daily minimum °F (°C)	39.0 (3.9)	41.7 (5.4)	47.1 (8.4)	53.0 (11.7)	62.2 (16.8)	69.6 (20.9)	72.4 (22.4)	72.1 (22.3)	66.9 (19.4)	55.4 (13.0)	44.3 (6.8)	40.9 (4.9)	55.4 (13.0)
Mean minimum °F (°C)	18.6 (−7.4)	21.7 (−5.7)	26.4 (−3.1)	33.6 (0.9)	44.3 (6.8)	56.0 (13.3)	64.4 (18.0)	62.7 (17.1)	50.3 (10.2)	34.2 (1.2)	26.7 (−2.9)	21.0 (−6.1)	15.6 (−9.1)
Record low °F (°C)	3 (−16)	11 (−12)	10 (−12)	25 (−4)	34 (1)	40 (4)	51 (11)	53 (12)	32 (0)	21 (−6)	15 (−9)	7 (−14)	3 (−16)
Average precipitation inches (mm)	6.05 (154)	5.13 (130)	5.09 (129)	5.45 (138)	4.82 (122)	6.20 (157)	6.61 (168)	6.60 (168)	5.47 (139)	3.92 (100)	4.20 (107)	5.75 (146)	65.29 (1,658)
Average precipitation days (≥ 0.01 in)	9.1	8.0	7.3	6.4	7.6	10.2	11.5	11.4	7.7	5.1	6.3	7.4	98.0
Source 1: NOAA
Source 2: National Weather Service (mean maxima/minima 1981–2010)

== Demographics ==
Historical population
Census	Pop.	Note	%±
1870	1,312		—
1880	1,660		26.5%
1890	1,115		−32.8%
1900	1,382		23.9%
1910	2,185		58.1%
1920	2,682		22.7%
1930	2,818		5.1%
1940	3,323		17.9%
1950	5,146		54.9%
1960	6,309		22.6%
1970	6,747		6.9%
1980	6,680		−1.0%
1990	5,885		−11.9%
2000	5,498		−6.6%
2010	5,408		−1.6%
2020	5,276		−2.4%
U.S. Decennial Census; 2013 Estimate

Brewton first appeared on the 1870 U.S. Census as a Beat (Precinct) 5 of Escambia County. It appeared as Beat (Precinct) 3 in 1880. The population listed here for 1870-80 was the entire precinct, also including the area outside the town. Beginning with the 1890 U.S. Census, it appeared separately as an incorporated town.

=== Racial and ethnic composition ===
Brewton city, Alabama – Racial and ethnic composition Note: the US Census treats Hispanic/Latino as an ethnic category. This table excludes Latinos from the racial categories and assigns them to a separate category. Hispanics/Latinos may be of any race.
Race / Ethnicity (NH = Non-Hispanic)	Pop 1980	Pop 1990	Pop 2000	Pop 2010	Pop 2020	% 1980	% 1990	% 2000	% 2010	% 2020
White alone (NH)	3,957	3,559	3,138	2,881	2,796	59.24%	60.48%	57.08%	53.27%	52.99%
Black or African American alone (NH)	2,657	2,257	2,209	2,300	2,146	39.78%	38.35%	40.18%	42.53%	40.67%
Native American or Alaska Native alone (NH)	9	12	23	38	33	0.13%	0.20%	0.42%	0.70%	0.63%
Asian alone (NH)	10	25	27	19	23	0.15%	0.42%	0.49%	0.35%	0.44%
Native Hawaiian or Pacific Islander alone (NH)	x	x	0	4	7	x	x	0.00%	0.07%	0.13%
Other race alone (NH)	0	13	2	5	6	0.00%	0.22%	0.04%	0.09%	0.11%
Mixed race or Multiracial (NH)	x	x	38	44	160	x	x	0.69%	0.81%	3.03%
Hispanic or Latino (any race)	47	19	61	117	105	0.70%	0.32%	1.11%	2.16%	1.99%
Total	6,680	5,885	5,498	5,408	5,276	100.00%	100.00%	100.00%	100.00%	100.00%

=== 2020 census ===
As of the 2020 census, there were 5,276 people, 2,147 households, and 1,249 families residing in the city.

The median age was 43.9 years. 21.4% of residents were under the age of 18 and 24.1% of residents were 65 years of age or older. For every 100 females there were 88.6 males, and for every 100 females age 18 and over there were 88.8 males age 18 and over.

81.1% of residents lived in urban areas, while 18.9% lived in rural areas.

There were 2,147 households in Brewton, of which 29.2% had children under the age of 18 living in them. Of all households, 37.0% were married-couple households, 18.4% were households with a male householder and no spouse or partner present, and 41.1% were households with a female householder and no spouse or partner present. About 36.0% of all households were made up of individuals and 20.3% had someone living alone who was 65 years of age or older.

There were 2,444 housing units, of which 12.2% were vacant. The homeowner vacancy rate was 3.4% and the rental vacancy rate was 7.5%.

=== 2010 census ===
As of the 2010 census there were 5,408 people, 2,171 households, and 1,412 families residing in the city. The population density was 474.9 inhabitants per square mile (183.4/km^{2}). There were 2,522 housing units at an average density of 221.2 per square mile (85.4/km^{2}). The racial makeup of the city was 54.1% White or Caucasian, 42.6% Black or African American, 0.7% Native American, 0.4% Asian, 1.1% from other races, and 1.0% from two or more races. 2.2% of the population were Hispanic or Latino of any race.

There were 2,171 households, out of which 25.6% had children under the age of 18 living with them, 41.1% were married couples living together, 19.6% had a female householder with no husband present, and 35.0% were non-families. 32.0% of all households were made up of individuals, and 16.3% had someone living alone who was 65 years of age or older. The average household size was 2.36 and the average family size was 2.97.

In the city, the population was spread out, with 22.7% under the age of 18, 7.8% from 18 to 24, 22.4% from 25 to 44, 27.9% from 45 to 64, and 19.2% who were 65 years of age or older. The median age was 42.4 years. For every 100 females, there were 86.2 males. For every 100 females age 18 and over, there were 96.8 males.

The median income for a household in the city was $34,390, and the median income for a family was $49,554. Males had a median income of $35,233 versus $28,879 for females. The per capita income for the city was $20,467. About 19.6% of families and 22.3% of the population were below the poverty line, including 41.3% of those under age 18 and 7.9% of those age 65 or over.

== Former Town of Alco (c1885/1888-1897) ==
Historical population
Census	Pop.	Note	%±
1890	249		—
U.S. Decennial Census

Within Brewton is the former incorporated town of Alco. It existed from the mid-to-late 1880s (exact incorporation date uncertain) until it was dissolved as a town in 1897. The name was derived from the Alabama Lumber Company. It was located just southwest of Brewton & the junction of Burnt Corn & Murder Creeks 31°05′50.6″N 87°05′07.9″W. The name of the town still lives on today on the names of the churches (Alco Baptist Church & Alco United Methodist Church) and Alco Road. Pilgrim's Rest Cemetery, one of the oldest in Escambia County, is located across from the United Methodist Church and mentions Alco on its historic marker. Alco was annexed into Brewton in June 1945.

=== Historic Demographics ===
Census Year	Population	State Place Rank	County Place Rank
1890 (Note: 1st year Alco reported on census)	249 (-) (Note: (-)Indicates no immediate prior population figure or rank) (Note: Racial demographics not reported for places of less than 2,500 on 1890 census.)	139th (-)	3rd (-)

== Government ==
The city government consists of a part-time mayor elected at-large and a five-member part-time city council elected from districts. Brewton utilizes a city school system (Brewton City Schools).

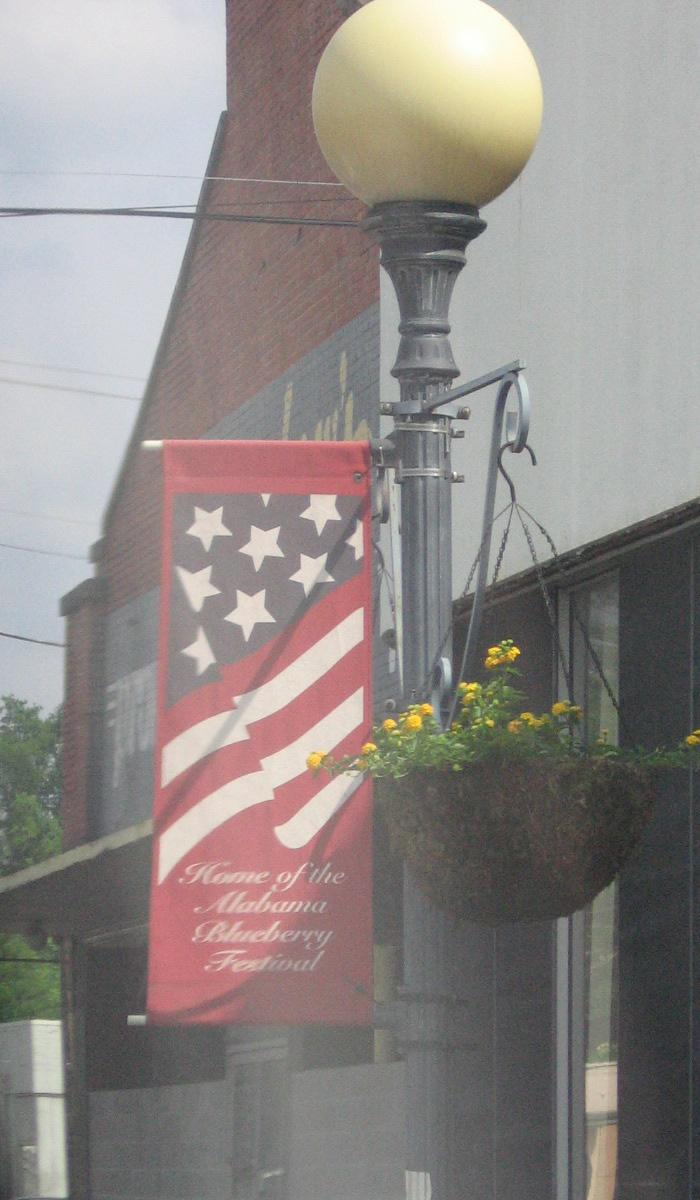
Streetlight banner proclaiming Brewton as "Home of the Alabama Blueberry Festival"

== Culture and special events ==
The annual Alabama Blueberry Festival is held at Jennings Park and downtown Brewton. Prior to 2006 it was held on the campus of Jefferson Davis Community College.

The Thomas E. McMillan Museum is housed on the campus of the Jefferson Davis Community College. It was founded in 1979 to chronicle life in Escambia County, Alabama.

== Notable people ==
- Sharon Lovelace Blackburn, the first female federal judge appointed in Alabama
- Johnnie Byrd, former member of the Florida House of Representatives
- Grayson Capps, singer-songwriter
- Catherine Crosby, Miss Alabama 2003
- Kristi DuBose, judge on the U.S. District Court for the Southern District of Alabama
- Wayne Frazier, pro football player, former Auburn University player
- William Lee Golden, member of The Oak Ridge Boys
- William R. Harvey, businessman and president of Hampton University
- Deanna Jackson, professional women's basketball player
- Teddy Keaton, football coach, Stillman College
- Cliff Lewis, former professional football player
- Hank Locklin, country music singer
- Jonathan Bell Lovelace, founder of Capital Group Companies
- Edwin L. Nelson, former judge on the United States District Court for the Northern District of Alabama
- Anthony Redmon, former NFL offensive lineman
- William W. Seay, soldier during the Vietnam War, recipient of the Medal of Honor
- Fred Snowden, former men's basketball coach for the University of Arizona
- Kevin Sumlin, football coach, University of Arizona football
- Davern Williams, former defensive tackle for the Miami Dolphins and New York Giants
- Edward O. Wilson, two-time Pulitzer prize winner and biologist

== Historic sites ==
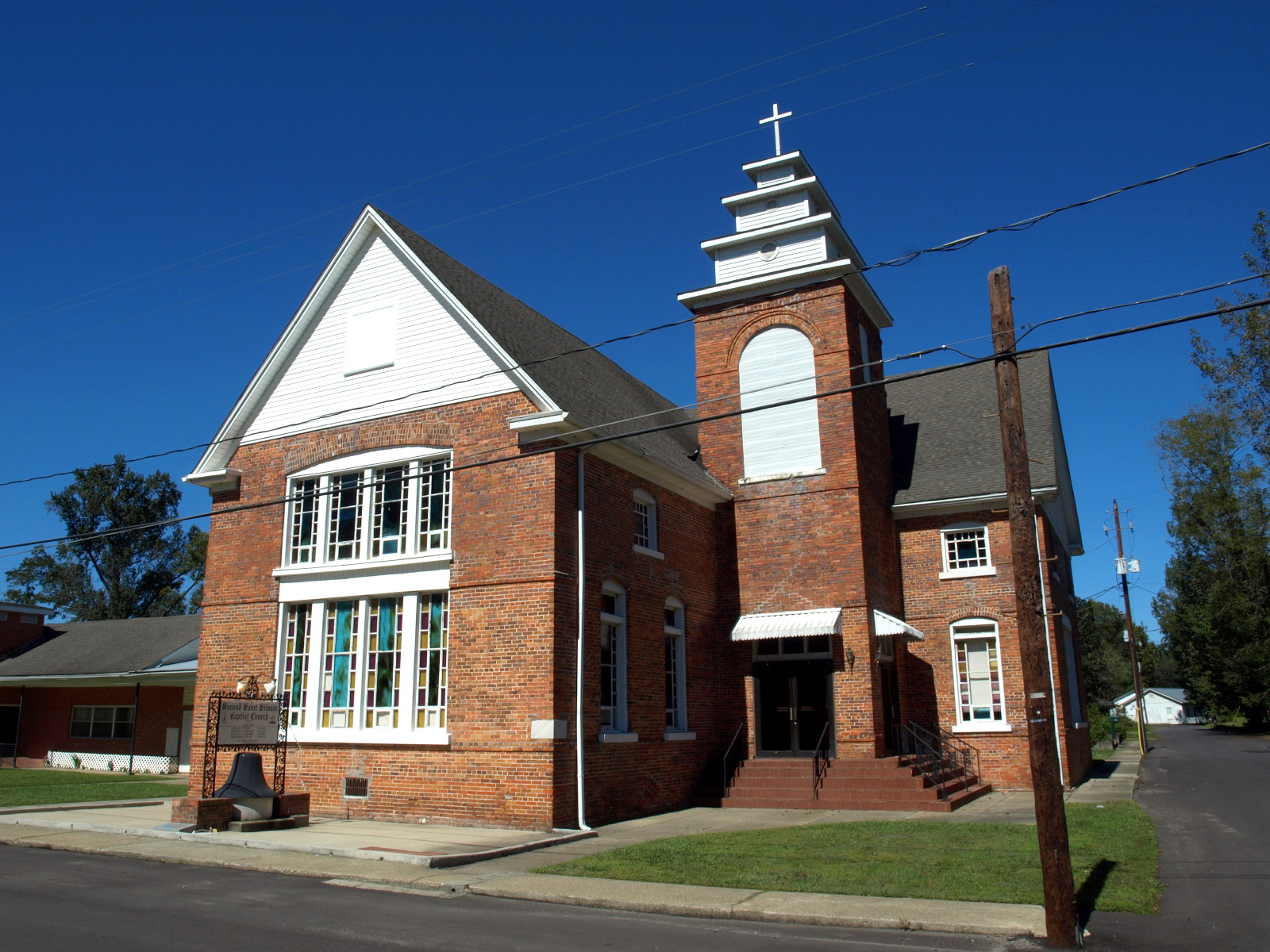
Second Saint Siloam Missionary Baptist Church, 2014

Brewton has one site listed on the National Register of Historic Places, the Brewton Historic Commercial District.

The historic Second Saint Siloam Missionary Baptist Church was established on November 5, 1909, when a group of worshipers gathered at the Congregational Church on the corner of St. Joseph and Evergreen avenues in Brewton to organize a new church. The Second St. Siloam Missionary Baptist Church was dedicated on June 10, 1910, on the corner of East and North streets. On April 1, 2010, the church was added to the Alabama Register of Historic Places.

== Transportation ==
Escambia County Alabama Transit System (ECATS) provides dial-a-ride bus service throughout the city and county.
