= Hotel Talisi =

Historic hotel in Alabama, US

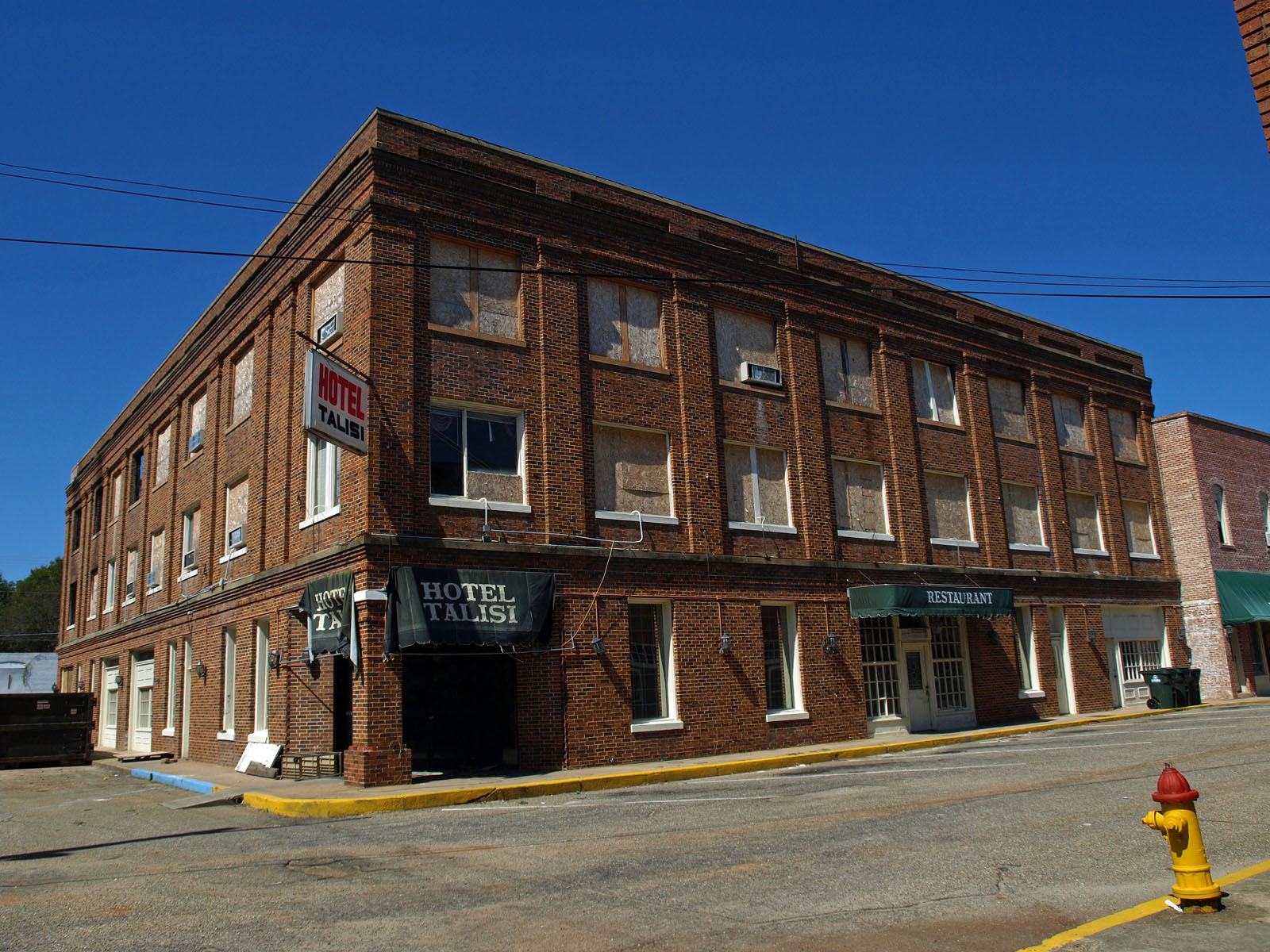
- Hotel Talisi (2010)

- Location within Alabama Hotel Talisi (the United States)
- Former names: Woodall Hotel (1928–1962)

General information
- Location: 14 Sistrunk Street, Tallassee, Alabama, United States
- Coordinates: 32°32′6.144″N 85°53′33.324″W
- Completed: 1928

Technical details
- Floor count: 3

Alabama Register of Landmarks and Heritage
- Designated: July 28, 1977

Hotel Talisi is a historic hotel in Tallassee, Alabama, United States. Built in 1928, the structure was added to the Alabama Register of Landmarks and Heritage in 1977. The building was severely damaged by arson in 2009.

== History ==
The building was constructed in 1928 as a replacement for the previous building at that location, which had been destroyed in 1915. Originally known as the Woodall Hotel, the name was changed to Hotel Talisi in 1962. The building also housed a restaurant on its first floor that was noted for its fried chicken and was a popular local venue for weddings and parties. On July 28, 1977, the building was added to the Alabama Register of Landmarks and Heritage.

On November 30, 2009, the building was severely damaged in an act of arson. In 2013, the building's owner announced plans to repair and reopen the building, but by 2018 these plans had not come to fruition. In March 2019, the city council for Tallassee, Alabama voted to condemn the building, with plans to demolish the structure. That same year, the building was added to Alabama Heritage Magazine's Places in Peril.

== See also ==
- Properties on the Alabama Register of Landmarks and Heritage by county (DeKalb–Jackson)
