= T. R. Miller High School =

Coordinates: 31.138275°N 87.070695°W

Location
- 1835 Douglas Avenue; Brewton, Alabama 36426; United States

Information
- Type: Public school
- School district: Brewton City Schools
- CEEB code: 010505
- Principal: Chuck Alford
- Faculty: 28
- Teaching staff: 21.29 (FTE)
- Grades: 9-12
- Enrollment: 373 (2024-2025)
- Student to teacher ratio: 17.52
- Colors: Red and white
- Athletics: Baseball, Basketball, Cheerleading, Cross Country, Football, Golf, Softball, Tennis, Track, Volleyball, Swimming
- Athletics conference: Alabama High School Athletic Association
- Mascot: Tigers
- Yearbook: The Tiger Roar
- Website: www.brewtoncityschools.org/o/trmhs

T. R. Miller High School is a public high school located in Brewton, Alabama educating students in grades 9-12. The school was named for local timber baron Thomas Richard Miller who financially contributed to the construction of the original school building. The school mascot is the T. R. Miller Tiger.

== Campus ==
The current campus, located off Douglas Avenue in the northern section of town, was opened in 1962 after moving from the previous location, now the site of Brewton Elementary School, less than one mile south. The school consisted of three wings of classrooms, a lunch room, a gym, a choir room, an art room, and an office area. The school was expanded to include a fourth wing consisting of four science classrooms in 1994. More recent additions include an auditorium and band room (completed in 1998), a field house for the football program (completed in 2001), a new gym (completed in 2002), and a new football practice field, track, and concession stands (completed in 2011). In 2013, the lunchroom and two wings of classrooms were demolished. In 2014 a new wing consisting of sixteen classrooms and a lunchroom was completed. In 2014 construction also began on a second wing which would include more classrooms, a media center, and an office area. It was completed in 2015. The auditorium, band room, art room, choir room, two gyms, science wing, and field house were not torn down and are still in use. Renovations to the football stadium began in 2015 and included updates to the home bleachers, a new press box, and a new scoreboard. Renovations to the baseball field also began in 2015 and included new dugouts, new batting cages, a new scoreboard, and eventually new bleachers. In 2016, a new stadium was built to be used for track and field and football practice. In 2017, new tennis courts were built.

== Competition teams ==
T. R. Miller's competition teams, such as the Marching Tiger Band, have been successful for many years. They have brought home hundreds of trophies and plaques. The Tiger Band had hosted the Dixieland Band Festival in years past, and in 2011 this annual tradition was brought back to life. Other teams like Scholars' Bowl, Math Team, and EnviroBowl have been successful. Envirobowl placed first in the regional tournament in 2016 and advanced to the state competition. The Scholars' Bowl team has won several tournaments. The math team had three of its members place in the top ten at the 2016 tournament, and seven in 2017. The Spanish Club attended its first competition in 2015.

== Sports ==
T. R. Miller High School has had success in several athletic programs, especially since the mid-1980s. The men's basketball team brought home a mythical state championship in 1952, which is to date the only championship the boys basketball program has won. The athletic program most closely identified with the school is the football team. The Tigers currently have six football state championships (1969, 1984, 1991, 1994, 2000, and 2002.) Most of the success had been under the helm of T. R. Miller graduate turned head coach Jamie Riggs. Under Riggs the Tigers won four state titles. The T. R. Miller football team was considered to be "the winningest football team of the 1990s" in the State of Alabama. In 2015, Riggs won his 300th coaching victory, becoming one of only four coaches in the state to achieve that milestone. On December 14, 2015, Riggs announced his retirement. On January 25, 2016, Riggs announced that he would put off his retirement until a suitable candidate for the position was found. On February 29, 2016, it was announced that Andrew Thomas of Trenton High School in Florida would take over as head football coach and athletic director effective April 1, 2016. Thomas resigned after a 5–5 season in 2017 which TRM failed to make the playoffs for the first time since 1983. On Dec 22, Keith Etheredge was hired as the new coach for the Tigers. Etheredge comes to TRM from Pell City where he coached two years. He is most known for his winning ways at Leeds High School, outside Birmingham. After one season at Miller Coach Etheredge left and was replaced by Coach Brent Hubbert. His first season at Miller, Hubbert coached the Tigers to the state semifinals. The Tiger track program has won numerous state championships over the last twenty years, most recently in 2009, 2010, and 2011, and the Lady Tiger basketball team brought home state titles in 1995, 1996, 2002, and 2009. T. R. Miller also has a successful baseball team under head coach Andy Lambert, softball team under head coach Haley Lynch, volleyball team under coach Terry Lynne Thompson, tennis teams under head coach Teralyn Kast, golf team under head coach Benson Stonicher, and swim team under head coach Lisa Atkinson. T.R. Miller's biggest rivalry game is with the W.S. Neal Eagles of East Brewton. The annual football game with the Eagles is called the Battle of Murder Creek. T.R Miller is up 55–23 in the rivalry.

== Notable alumni ==
- Dowe Aughtman, former Auburn University football player, former NFL player
- Anthony Redmon, former Auburn University football player, former NFL player
- Walter Lewis, first black starting quarterback for the University of Alabama, Heisman Trophy nominee, former United States Football League/Canadian Football League player
