= Anthony Redmon =

American football player (born 1971)

No. 60, 61
- Position: Guard

Personal information
- Born: April 9, 1971 (age 55); Brewton, Alabama, U.S.
- Listed height: 6 ft 5 in (1.96 m)
- Listed weight: 308 lb (140 kg)

Career information
- High school: T. R. Miller (Brewton, Alabama)
- College: Auburn
- NFL draft: 1994: 5th round, 139th overall pick

Career history
- Arizona Cardinals (1994–1997); Miami Dolphins (1998)*; Carolina Panthers (1998–1999); Atlanta Falcons (2000)
- * Offseason or practice squad member only

Awards and highlights
- PFWA All-Rookie Team (1994); Second-team All-SEC (1993)

Career NFL statistics
- Games played: 79
- Games started: 69
- Fumble recoveries: 2
- Stats at Pro Football Reference

Anthony Redmon (born April 9, 1971) is an American former professional football player who was a guard in the National Football League (NFL). He was selected by the Arizona Cardinals in the fifth round of the 1994 NFL draft. He played college football for the Auburn Tigers.

Redmon also played for the Carolina Panthers, and Atlanta Falcons.

== Professional career ==
=== Arizona Cardinals ===
Redmon was drafted by the Arizona Cardinals in the fifth round of the 1994 NFL draft. He played for the team until 1997, starting 46 of 49 games at right guard.

=== Carolina Panthers ===
Before the 1998 season Redmon signed with Carolina Panthers. In his two years with the team he started 19 of 29 games at right guard.

=== Atlanta Falcons ===
Redmon signed with the Atlanta Falcons before the 2000 season. In his only year with the team, he made 4 starts.
