= Downing Industrial School =

Defunct school for girls in Alabama

Downing Industrial School, also known as Downing Shofner Institute, was a school for girls in Brewton, Alabama.

The school was named for a donor. The school had a string band that was photographed. The campus included C. L. Wiggins Hall. A historical marker commemorates the school's history. The Alabama Department of Archives and History has brochures from the school.

== History ==
The school opened on September 24, 1906, and had nine girl students, three teachers, and a matron. Reverend J. M. Shofner wrote about his life and the school in a small book published in 1919.
