= Mike Morgan (running back) =

American football player (born 1956)

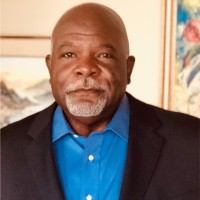

No. 29
- Position: Running back

Personal information
- Born: January 19, 1956 (age 70); Tallassee, Alabama, U.S.
- Listed height: 5 ft 11 in (1.80 m)
- Listed weight: 207 lb (94 kg)

Career information
- High school: Lane Tech (Chicago, Illinois)
- College: Wisconsin
- NFL draft: 1978: undrafted

Career history
- Chicago Bears (1978)

Career NFL statistics
- Games played: 5
- Kick returns: 5
- Return yards: 110
- Stats at Pro Football Reference

Michael Lee Morgan (born January 19, 1956) is an American attorney, former government official, and former National Football League (NFL) running back. He played college football for the Wisconsin Badgers from 1974 to 1977 and later appeared with the Chicago Bears during the 1978 NFL season. After his playing career, Morgan worked as a prosecutor in the Milwaukee County District Attorney’s Office and went on to serve in several senior public-sector roles, including Commissioner of the Milwaukee Department of City Development, Secretary of the Wisconsin Department of Revenue, and Secretary of the Department of Administration as a senior deputy to Governor Jim Doyle. In July 2010, he was appointed Senior Vice President for Administration and Fiscal Affairs for the University of Wisconsin System. Morgan has also held private-sector positions, served on numerous civic and nonprofit boards, and currently works as a management consultant in Milwaukee while chairing the board of the African American Leadership Alliance Milwaukee.

== Early life and education ==
Michael Lee Morgan was born on January 19, 1956, in Tallassee, Alabama. After his parents separated, he moved with his mother to Chicago, where he attended Lane Tech High School; there he transitioned from an initial interest in baseball to football, became a varsity player as a sophomore, and earned high school All-American honors. Morgan attended the University of Wisconsin–Madison, earning a B.A. in Communication Arts in 1978, and later returned to UW to receive a Juris Doctor in 1985.

== Football ==
=== College ===
Morgan was a four-year letterman at Wisconsin (1974–1977) who played running back in 44 games. Season-by-season college statistics are as follows:

- 1974: 11 games, 85 rushes for 461 yards (5.4 Y/A) and 8 rushing TDs; 4 receptions for 34 yards; 89 plays for 495 scrimmage yards; ranked on Big Ten leaderboards for rushing TDs and touchdowns from scrimmage.
- 1975: 11 games, 38 rushes for 184 yards (4.8 Y/A) and 1 rushing TD; 8 receptions for 155 yards and 1 receiving TD; 46 plays for 339 scrimmage yards.
- 1976: 11 games, 37 rushes for 231 yards (6.2 Y/A) and 1 rushing TD; 6 receptions for 84 yards; 43 plays for 315 scrimmage yards.
- 1977: 11 games, 124 rushes for 478 yards (3.9 Y/A) and 3 rushing TDs; 7 receptions for 48 yards; 131 plays for 526 scrimmage yards; placed on Big Ten leaderboard for plays from scrimmage.

Career totals (Wisconsin): 44 games, 284 carries for 1,354 rushing yards (4.8 Y/A), 13 rushing TDs; 25 receptions for 321 yards and 1 receiving TD; 309 plays for 1,675 yards from scrimmage and 14 total TDs. Morgan lettered each season from 1974 through 1977.

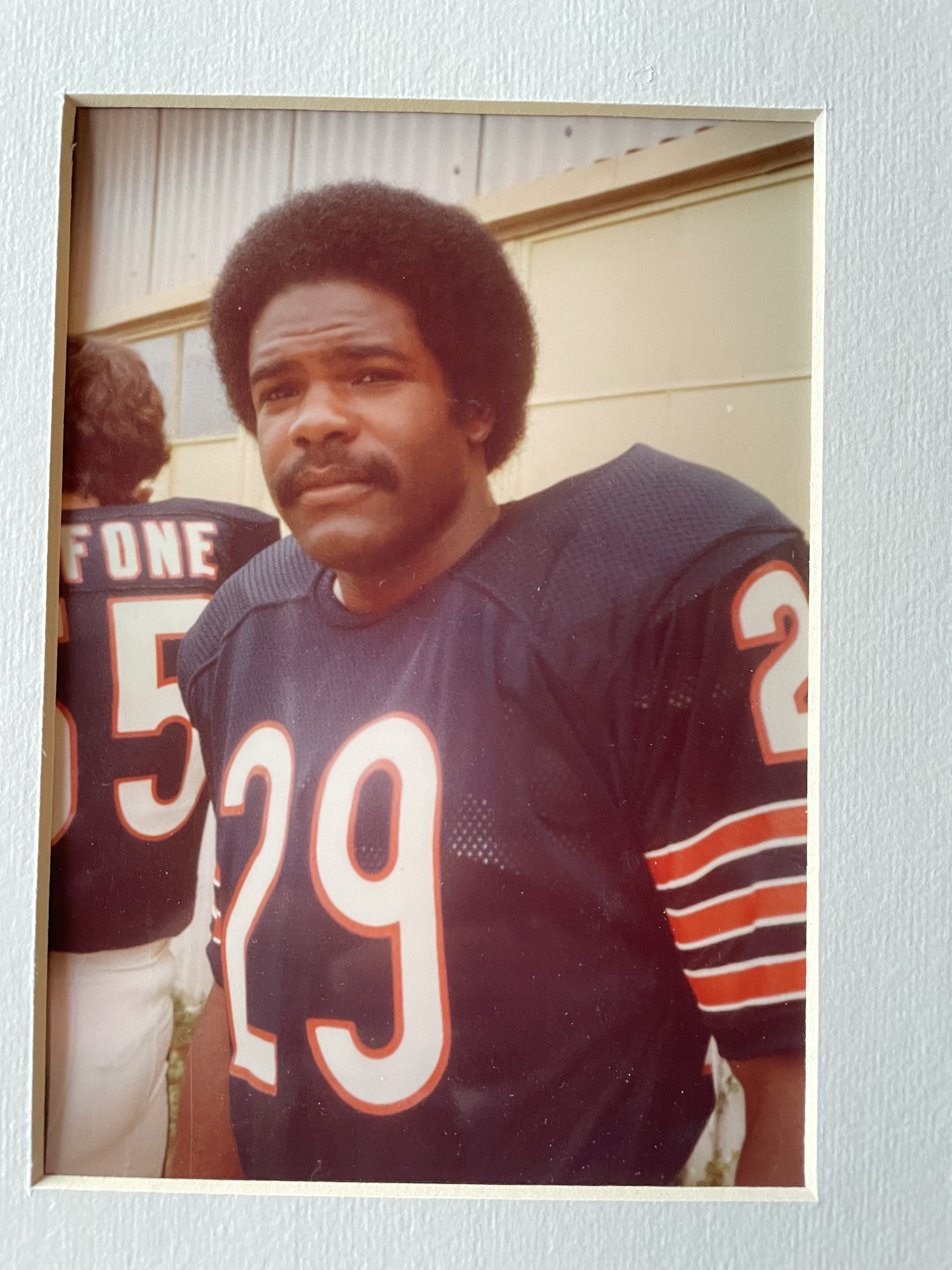
Mike Morgan in his Bears uniform

=== Professional football career ===
Morgan signed with the Chicago Bears as a free agent in 1978. Pro Football Archives lists the following NFL roster/transaction activity: signed 5/22/1978 (Chicago), released 8/23/1978, re-signed 8/29/1978, released 10/4/1978, re-signed 12/28/1978; he was on the Bears’ 1978 roster and appeared in 5 NFL games that season. As a kickoff returner he recorded 5 returns for 110 yards (22.0 average, long 24).

In 1979 he had additional transaction activity: signed with Chicago in 1979 (entry appears), later signed with the Philadelphia Eagles in 1979 but suffered a knee injury on the first day of training camp and was released/injured on August 20, 1979, effectively ending his professional playing career.

== Career ==
=== Post-Football Career ===
After his playing career, Morgan worked in sales as a Territory Sales Manager for Ross Laboratories (a division of Abbott Laboratories) from 1979 to 1981. He then earned a J.D. from the University of Wisconsin Law School in 1985 and served as an Assistant District Attorney in the Milwaukee County District Attorney’s Office from 1985 to 1987.

=== City of Milwaukee service ===
Morgan held several senior municipal positions in Milwaukee between the late 1980s and the late 1990s. Roles listed in his professional vitae include Executive Director of the Fire and Police Commission (December 1990–July 1992), Director of the Division of Intergovernmental Relations (July 1992 – 1993), and Commissioner of the Department of City Development (November 1993–December 1998). As Commissioner of City Development he directed real estate and business development investment efforts (through RACM and MEDC), and led redevelopment initiatives including RiverWalk and downtown housing/commercial projects.

=== Philanthropy and nonprofit leadership ===
From 1999 to 2001 Morgan served as President and CEO of Spirit of Milwaukee, Inc., a nonprofit charged with promoting Milwaukee’s cultural and institutional assets. From 2001 to 2003 he was Program Related Investment Officer at the Helen Bader Foundation, where he established and managed the Foundation’s Program Related Investment Fund to provide loans, loan guarantees, and equity investments as risk capital to entrepreneurs and nonprofits.

=== State government: Revenue and Administration ===
Morgan joined the cabinet of Wisconsin Governor Jim Doyle, serving as Secretary of the Department of Revenue from January 2003 to January 2007, and as Secretary of the Department of Administration from January 2007 to June 2010. In those roles he advised the Governor on tax policy and administration, managed the state’s fiscal functions, oversaw statewide IT and facilities planning, and had responsibility for real estate assets and statewide administrative programs.

=== University of Wisconsin System ===
On June 11, 2010, the University of Wisconsin System announced Morgan’s appointment as Senior Vice President for Administration and Fiscal Affairs; he accepted a three-year appointment effective July 6, 2010, serving as the system’s chief operating officer with oversight for finance, budgeting, IT, facilities planning, human resources, legal affairs, and related areas. The UW press release noted an annual salary of $245,000, and stated Morgan would advise the System President and Board of Regents and work closely with chief business officers across UW institutions. He succeeded Tom Anderes in the role.

== Community Involvement and Personal Life ==
Morgan is married to Diana Lee Morgan; the couple have two daughters (Jennifer and Daniela) and grandchildren. In interviews he has credited his parents — especially his mother’s competitiveness and his father’s commitment — for shaping his work ethic; he has also spoken about the life changes after moving from Tallassee to Chicago and how football provided scholarship opportunities and shaped his career trajectory.

Morgan has served on many civic and nonprofit boards, including the Boys and Girls Club of Metro Milwaukee (trustee), United Way of Dane County (board member), the Big Ten Advisory Commission, Aurora Healthcare Community board, Midwest Higher Education Commission (commissioner alternate), and others. Memberships and awards listed in his vitae include the National Association of Chief Business Officers, State Bar of Wisconsin, National Association of State Budget Officers, President’s Award (Boys and Girls Club of Metro Milwaukee), the Gertie Award (Milwaukee RiverWalk District), and an Economic Trailblazer Award.
