= Brewton Historic Commercial District =

Historic district in Alabama, United States

- U.S. National Register of Historic Places
- U.S. Historic district
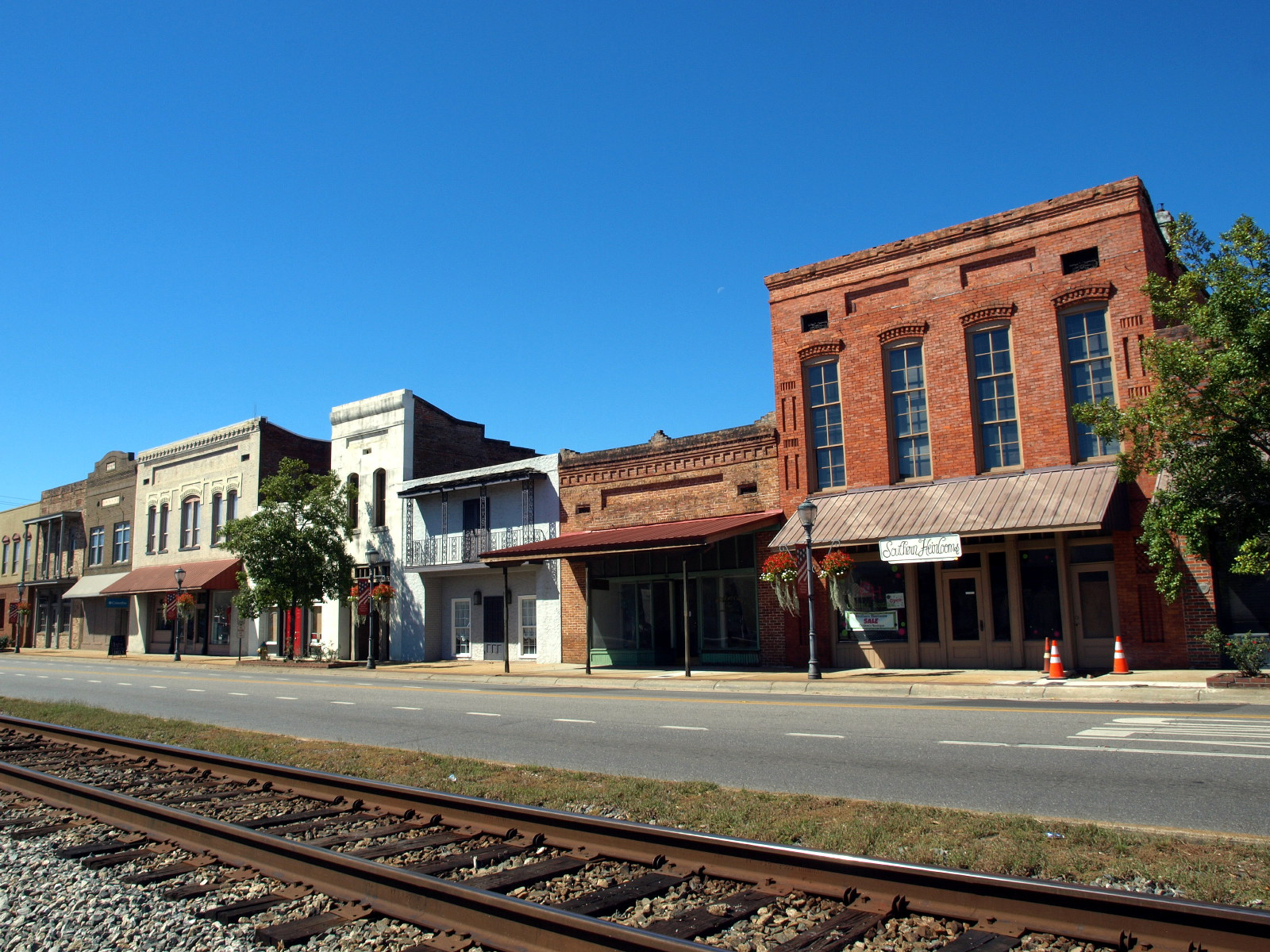

- Location within Alabama Location within the United States
- Location: AL 3 and US 31, Brewton, Alabama
- Coordinates: 31°6′14″N 87°4′19″W
- Area: 13 acres (5.3 ha)
- Built: 1883
- NRHP reference No.: 82002013
- Added to NRHP: March 15, 1982

The Brewton Historic Commercial District is a 13-acre (5.3 ha) historic district in Brewton, Alabama, United States. It is centered on U.S. Route 31. During its heyday it was the largest commercial center on the railroad between Montgomery and the Gulf Coast ports of Pensacola and Mobile. The district was the early commercial area of the town, with the majority of the structures dating to the late 19th and early 20th centuries. It contained 47 properties. It was added to the National Register of Historic Places on March 15, 1982.
