= Tallassee Confederate Armory =

U.S. Confederate Armory

- U.S. National Register of Historic Places
- U.S. Historic district – Contributing property
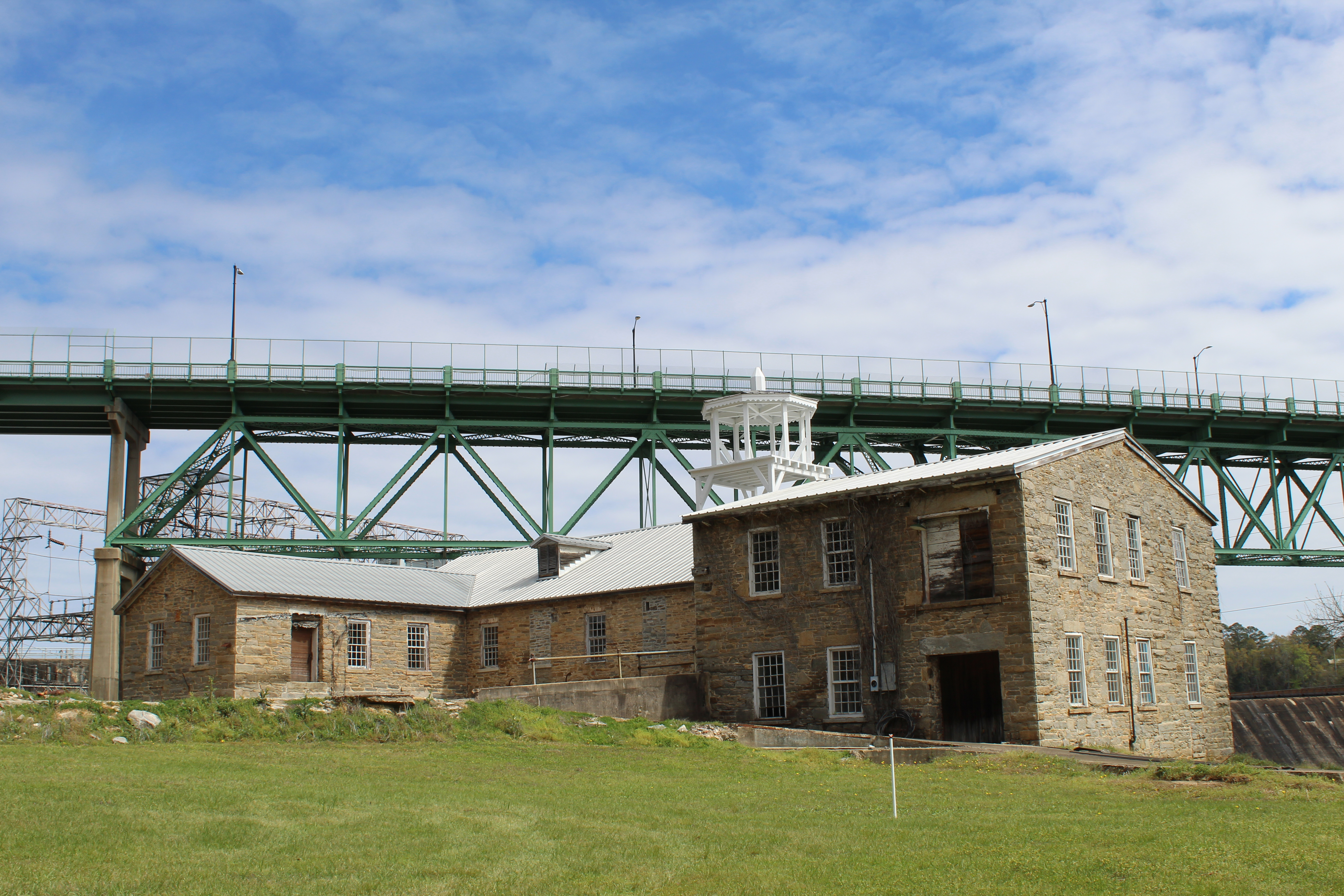
- The Tallassee Armory building in 2026
- Location: Tallassee, Alabama
- Coordinates: 32°32′08″N 85°53′38″W
- Built: 1844
- Part of: Tallassee Historical District
- NRHP reference No.: 09000734
- Added to NRHP: August 30, 2010

The Tallassee Confederate Armory or the 1844 Tallassee Mill, was cotton processing mill and later military site located in Tallassee, Alabama. Originally constructed as a textile mill, it served as a manufacturing site for Confederate firearms during the American Civil War. It is notable for being the only Confederate armory building to survive the war without being destroyed by Union forces.

== History ==
=== Origins as a Textile Mill (1844–1864) ===
The structure was built in 1844 by Thomas Meriwether Barnett and William Matthews Marks as Tallassee’s first textile mill. Situated on the west bank of the Tallapoosa River, the mill utilized water power to operate its machinery.

=== Civil War and Confederate Armory (1864–1865) ===
In 1864, Union forces had plans to attack the Richmond Armory in Virginia, Confederate Chief of Ordnance Josiah Gorgas sought a more secure, inland location for the production of cavalry carbines. Tallassee was selected due to its strategic remoteness and the reliable power source provided by the Tallapoosa River.

The Confederate government leased the 1844 mill building, and machinery was transported from Richmond to Alabama. Under the command of Captain Charles P. Bolles, the facility was converted into the Tallassee Armory.

==== The "Survivor" Status ====
The armory is unique in that it was never destroyed during the conflict. Local legend affirms that two Union raids were to target Tallassee's armory, led by Major General Lovell Rousseau in 1864 and Major General James H. Wilson in 1865. Virginia Noble Golden in A History of Tallassee for Tallasseans recounts a detachment of Wilson's forces arriving and enlisting the help of an enslaved man. When giving directions to the armory that appeared contrary to Union intelligence, he was shot, and Wilson's forces moved on.

However, according to William Troy Ledbetter's research in his Thesis, THE HISTORY OF THE TALLASSEE ARMORY 1864 TO 1865 records confirm Wilson's only forces were directed to attack Tallassee. And that while Rousseau's march passed within 15 miles of Tallassee via Dadeville, he was directed to attack elsewhere. Ledbetter also notes that a successful defense was unlikely due to records of superior Union forces in the area.

==== The Tallassee Carbine ====
The Tallassee Carbine was a single-shot, muzzle-loading rifle designed for cavalry use. About 500 units were manufactured before the armory stopped operations in April 1865. Because production began late in the war, these rifles never saw active service. Today, the Tallassee Carbine is considered a rare Confederate-made firearm, with fewer than a dozen known specimens remaining in museums and private collections. One of which was housed at the Smithsonian Museum.

== See also ==
- Tallassee Mills
