= Frankfort, Alabama =

Unincorporated community in Alabama, United States

- Unincorporated community
- Location within Alabama Location within the United States
- Coordinates: 34°33′48″N 87°50′32″W
- Country: United States
- State: Alabama
- County: Franklin
- Elevation: 741 ft (226 m)
- Time zone: UTC-6 (Central (CST))
  - Summer (DST): UTC-5 (CDT)
- Area codes: 256 and 938
- GNIS feature ID: 118592

Frankfort is an unincorporated community in Franklin County, Alabama, United States.

== History ==
The name Frankfort comes from a combination of Franklin (the county) and fort. In 1849, Franklin County consisted of all of current Franklin County and Colbert County. A vote was held to move the county seat to a more central location from Russellville, and Frankfort was founded in that location. The courthouse and jail were built from local-made brick. In 1879, the county seat was moved to Belgreen. A post office operated under the name Frankfort from 1852 to 1909.

The Frankfort (stone) meteorite, a Howardite meteorite, fell in Frankfort on December 5, 1868.
