= Second Saint Siloam Missionary Baptist Church =

Coordinates: 31°6′32.23″N 87°3′51.79″W

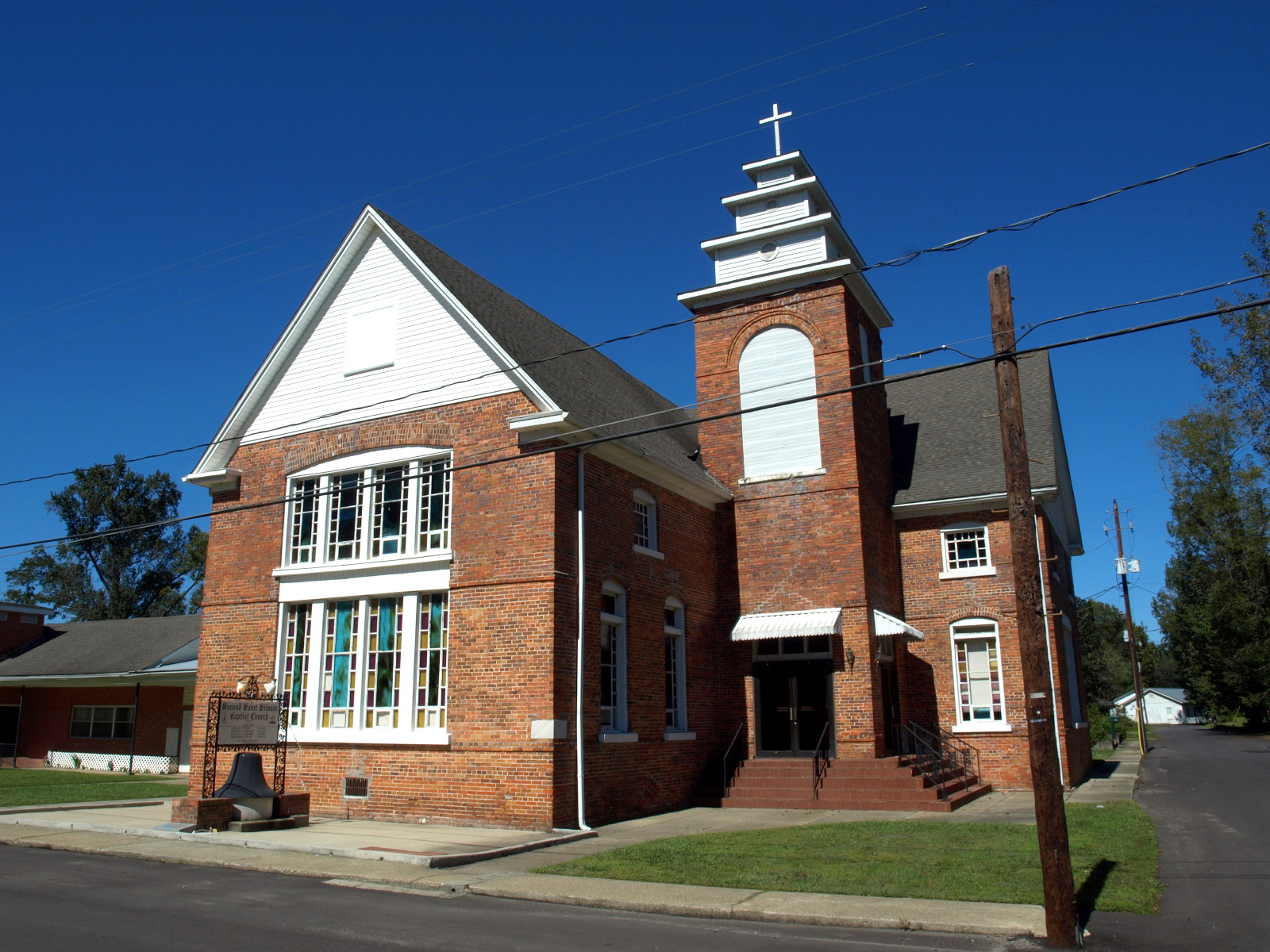
- Second Saint Siloam Missionary Baptist Church Oct 2014
- Interactive map of Second Saint Siloam Missionary Baptist Church

Alabama Register of Landmarks and Heritage
- Designated: April 1, 2010

The Second St. Siloam Missionary Baptist Church is an historic Baptist church located in Brewton, Alabama, United States.

== History ==
On November 5, 1909, a group of worshipers gathered in the Congregational Church at the corner of St. Joseph and Evergreen avenues to organize the Second St. Siloam Missionary Baptist Church. On June 10, 1910, the congregation dedicated the new church, which is located on the corner of East and North streets. The church's first pastor was Rev. Williams Franklin.

The church features a unique design, with the interior core forming a cross with a three sided cathedral balcony, ceiling, and bell tower.

The church building has been named in the Alabama Register of Landmarks and Heritage
