= Alabama Heritage Magazine =

Nonprofit educational quarterly history magazine

Alabama Heritage
- Cover for the Summer 2013 issue featuring Bear Bryant
- Editor: Susan E. Reynolds, PhD
- Director: Rebecca Todd Minder
- Categories: History, Alabama
- Frequency: Quarterly
- Circulation: 10,000
- Publisher: University of Alabama, University of Alabama at Birmingham, and Alabama Department of Archives and History
- First issue: Summer 1986
- Country: United States
- Based in: Tuscaloosa, Alabama
- Language: English
- Website: www.alabamaheritage.com
- ISSN: 0887-493X

Alabama Heritage (ISSN 0887-493X) is a nonprofit educational quarterly history magazine first published during the summer of 1986. It is published by the University of Alabama, the University of Alabama at Birmingham, and the Alabama Department of Archives and History. The magazine was conceived with a broad conception of "heritage," incorporating more than traditional history. Issues include articles about archaeology, architecture, anthropology, religion, folk arts, literature, and music. Alabama Heritage, through support from Blue Cross and Blue Shield, is available in every school in the state of Alabama.

== History ==
- In 1985, Bill Barnard, then-chair of the University of Alabama's history department, first broached the idea of a state history magazine and recruited Suzanne Wolfe to run with it. The first issue rolled out in the summer of 1986.
- In the mid-1990s, proration caused severe strains on the state's education budgets. Out of money and in danger of an issue not being delivered, the community came to the magazine's rescue.
- Currently the magazine is funded by the University of Alabama, the University of Alabama at Birmingham, and the Alabama Department of Archives and History, as well as a "Friends of Alabama Heritage," which has been a key pillar of the magazine's long-term survival.
- The magazine was formerly housed at the Kilgore House, which was part of the Bryce Hospital in Tuscaloosa, Alabama, and considered to be haunted. The editors of the magazine invited paranormal experts to record activity.
- Alabama Heritage announced the appointment of Rebecca Todd Minder as its new Director as of October 2021.

== Community impact ==
Alabama Heritage's award-winning feature writing has made an impact in historic preservation (see "Places in Peril" below) and also in politics. Alabama Governor Robert Bentley signed the Scottsboro Boys Act in 2013, which finally and officially exonerated the Scottsboro Boys (nine African-American teens, wrongfully convicted of raping two white women in 1931. Only one was pardoned before his death.) The Alabama Heritage feature on the Scottsboro Boys -- "Awaiting Justice: The Improbable Pardon of 'Scottsboro Boy' Clarence Norris" by Tom Reidy (Issue 105, Summer 2012) —was handed to Gov. Bentley with a plea for a pardoning from Sheila Washington, director of Scottsboro Boys Museum and Cultural Center. Also, Sherman W. White Jr., one of the Tuskegee Airmen was finally honored after an article in Alabama Heritage magazine prompted his hometown of Montgomery, Alabama, to create a historic marker in his honor.

== Becoming Alabama ==
In 2010, Alabama Heritage—in partnership with the Summersell Center for Study of the South, the University of Alabama Department of History, and the Alabama Tourism Department—created a regular department in Alabama Heritage magazine as a part of the statewide "Becoming Alabama" initiative—a cooperative venture of state organizations to commemorate Alabama's experiences related to the Creek War, the Civil War, and the civil rights movement. Quarter by quarter, the Becoming Alabama stories detail the corresponding seasons 200, 150, and 50 years ago—sometimes describing pivotal events, sometimes describing daily life, but always illuminating a world in flux.

== Places in Peril ==
Inspired by the National Trust's yearly listing of "America's Most Endangered Historic Places," a handful of Alabama preservationists decided to develop a similar roster for their own state. The initial list of ten sites, then referred to as "Alabama's Most Endangered Properties," came out in 1994, first as a media release, then as a full article in the fall issue of Alabama Heritage magazine. Annually since then—in a joint undertaking between the Alabama Historical Commission, the Alabama Trust, and Alabama Heritage—more threatened landmarks have been highlighted in the feature now called "Places in Peril." These 216 properties represent a broad array of places depicting Alabama's story from prehistoric times to the civil rights struggles of the 1960s. Of the 216 properties listed as Places in Peril in the past twenty years, approximately 59 are no longer endangered, and 35 have been destroyed. The verdict is still out on the remaining 122 sites. Some of the success stories may have had a connection to being listed. Locust Hill in Tuscumbia, for example, was on the market when it was included in Places in Peril in 2004. The media attention given to the site inspired a couple to purchase the building as their home. In 1998 the Queen City Pool in Tuscaloosa was abandoned with an uncertain future. Today, the property has been restored as the Mildred Westervelt Warner Transportation Museum. The annual list has encouraged property owners, city officials, local organizations, and potential buyers to preserve these properties and keep them viable.
