= Jonathan Bell Lovelace =

American businessman (1895–1979)

- Born: 1895
- Died: 1979
- Education: Auburn University
- Occupation(s): Businessman, football coach, investor
- Children: Jon B. Lovelace Jr. (1927-2011)

Jonathan Bell Lovelace (1895–1979) was an American businessman, football coach, and investor. He was the founder of Capital Group Companies.

== Early life ==
Jonathan Bell Lovelace was born in 1895. He grew up in Brewton, Alabama and attended Auburn University.

== Career ==
Lovelace spent most of the 1920s at a Detroit banking/brokerage firm, developing his investment research techniques and earning impressive results. In 1924, he became a partner in E.E. MacCrone. By 1929, before the stock market crash, he could see no logical relationship between stock market prices and their underlying values, so he sold his interest in the firm, took his investments out of the market and moved to California.

Lovelace founded Capital Research and Management Company in 1931 which was at first a small firm named Lovelace, Dennis and Renfrew.

== Personal life ==
His son, Jon B. Lovelace Jr., a Hotchkiss School 1944 graduate, served as an executive at Capital Group Companies. In 2007, his son and family were ranked #840 on the Forbes Billionaires List worth $1.1 billion. As of 2019, grandson Rob Lovelace serves as an investment manager for a Capital Group fund.

=== Death ===
He died in 1979.
