= Keener, Alabama =

Unincorporated community in Alabama, United States

- Unincorporated community
- Location within Alabama Location within the United States
- Coordinates: 34°09′22″N 85°57′04″W
- Country: United States
- State: Alabama
- County: Etowah
- Elevation: 676 ft (206 m)
- Time zone: UTC-6 (Central (CST))
  - Summer (DST): UTC-5 (CDT)
- Area codes: 256 & 938
- GNIS feature ID: 121099

Keener, also known as Greenwood, is an unincorporated community in Etowah County, Alabama, United States.

== History ==
Keener was named for George W. Keener, who donated for a station on the Alabama Great Southern Railroad. Iron ore was once mined in Keener, and the community had a sawmill, two cotton gins, five general stores, and a school. A post office operated under the name Greenwood from 1870 to 1888 and under the name Keener from 1888 to 1954.
