= The Elms (Coosada, Alabama) =

Coordinates: 32°29′51″N 86°21′02″W

- Location: Coosada, Alabama

Alabama Register of Landmarks and Heritage
- Official name: The Elms
- Designated: August 15, 1983

The Elms is a former plantation home in Coosada in Elmore County, Alabama. It is now an event center, listed on the Alabama Register of Landmarks and Heritage.

The Greek Revival mansion was built in 1836 by Absalom Jackson, the son of politician James Jackson.

According to the 1830 Census, Absalom Jackson enslaved 16 people. He enslaved 8 more by 1832, from his father's estate, purchased 2 in 1837, and by 1840 enslaved 46, according to the Census. The 1850 Census lists him enslaving 62 people, the 1860 Census enslaving 78 people, and in December 1860 he enslaved 37 more, from his brother's estate.
