= Brewton City Schools =

School district in Alabama

Coordinates: 31.1178°N 87.0735°W

Brewton City School District is a school district in Escambia County, Alabama, United States.

The District includes:

- Brewton Elementary School
- Brewton Middle School
- T. R. Miller High School
