= Tallassee Mills =

- U.S. National Register of Historic Places
- U.S. Historic district
- Alabama Register of Landmarks and Heritage
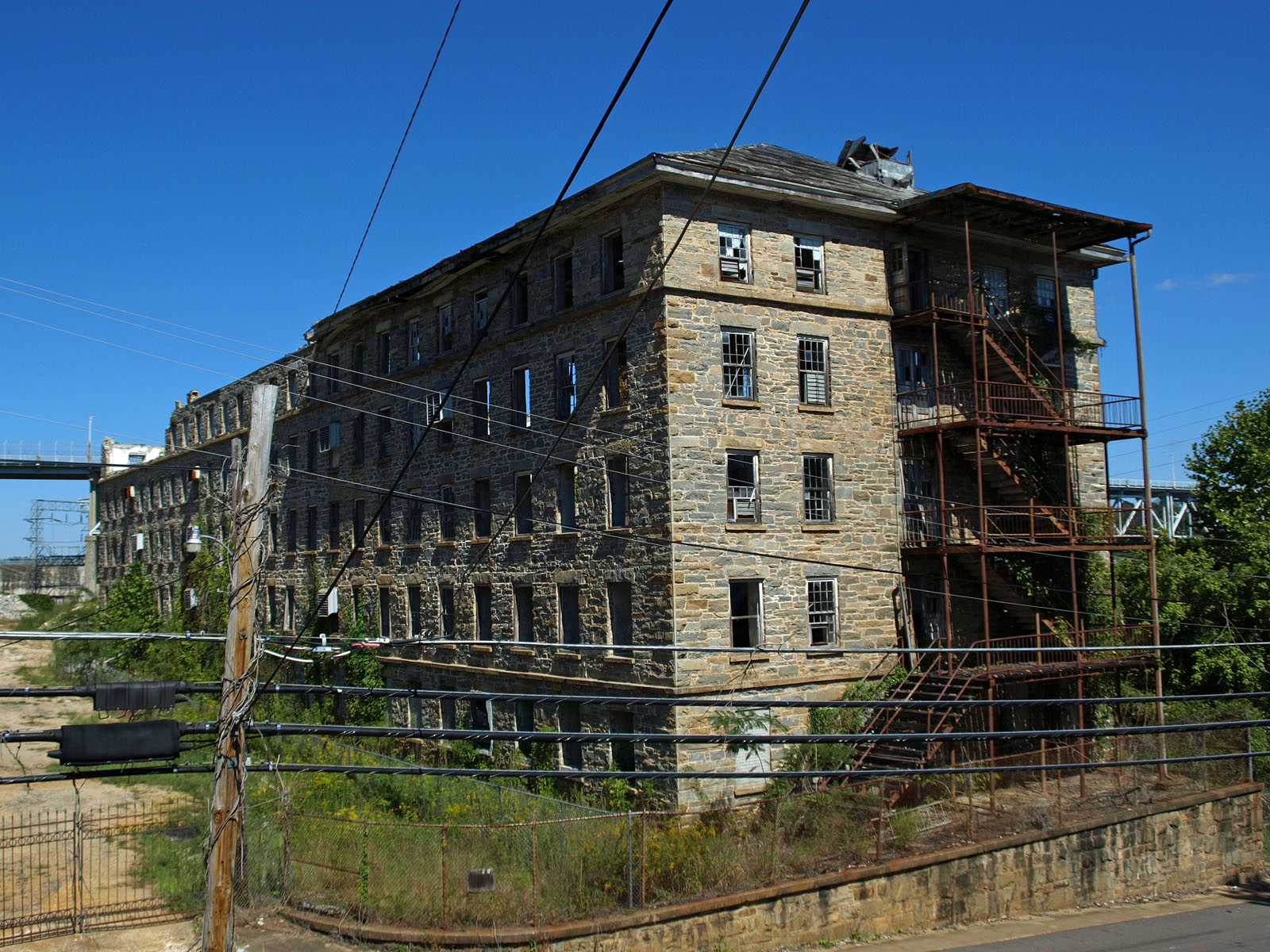
- Tallassee Mills in 2010
- Location: 1844 Old Mill Rd., Tallassee, Alabama
- Coordinates: 32°31′53.3″N 85°53′10.1″W
- Area: 5 acres (2.0 ha)
- Built: 1844
- Architectural style: Industrial complex
- NRHP reference No.: 09000734

Significant dates
- Added to NRHP: April 26, 2010
- Designated ARLH: January 18, 1978

The Tallassee Mills were cotton mills established by the Tallassee Falls Manufacturing Company in 1841 in Tallassee, Alabama, United States, at the falls of the Tallapoosa River. At the time of their closure in 2005, the Tallassee Mills were the oldest continuously operating textile mills in the country.

The mills were placed on the National Register of Historic Places on April 26, 2010.
