= Capital Group Companies =

American financial services company

Capital Group Companies, Inc.

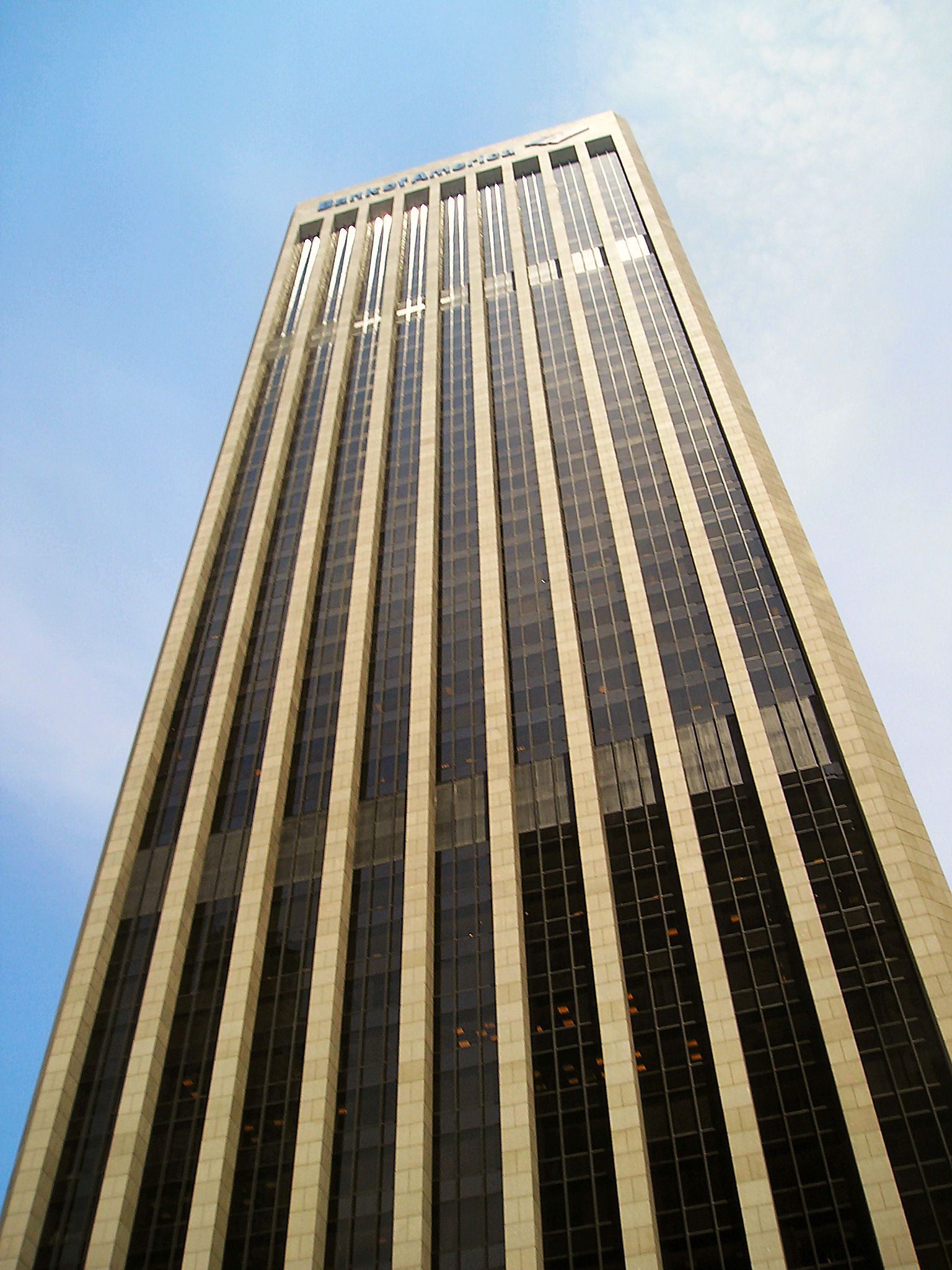
- Headquarters at Bank of America Plaza
- Type: Private
- Industry: Investment management
- Founded: 1931; 95 years ago
- Founder: Jonathan Bell Lovelace
- Headquarters: Los Angeles, California, United States
- Area served: Worldwide
- Key people: Mike Gitlin (CEO)
- Products: Asset management; Wealth management
- Revenue: ▲$7.6 billion (2020)
- AUM: ▲$3.0 trillion (June 2025)
- Number of employees: 7,500 (2020)
- Subsidiaries: American Funds, Capital Research and Management Company, Capital Bank and Trust Company, FSB
- Website: capitalgroup.com

Capital Group is an American investment management company. It ranks among the world's oldest and largest investment management organizations, with over $3.0 trillion in assets under management. Founded in Los Angeles, California in 1931, it is privately held and has offices around the globe in the Americas, Asia, Australia and Europe.

Capital offers a range of products focused on active management, including more than 40 mutual funds through its subsidiary, American Funds Distributors, as well as separately managed accounts (or collective investment trusts), private equity, investment services for high net worth investors in the U.S., and a range of other offerings for institutional clients and individual investors globally.

== History ==
In 1931, Jonathan Bell Lovelace founded the investment firm, Lovelace, Dennis & Renfrew, which would eventually become Capital Group. Lovelace had previously been a partner in the stock brokerage firm E.E. MacCrone, where he explored the concept of developing an open-end mutual fund. He eventually sold his stake in that company, just before the Wall Street Crash of 1929.

In 1933, Lovelace's firm took over management of The Investment Company of America, which he had launched at E.E. MacCrone in 1927. For the next 20 years, the firm enjoyed modest success. As mutual funds gained in popularity in the 1950s, Capital's roster of mutual funds grew.

The International Resources Fund, established in 1954, was Capital's first foray into international investing. A year earlier, Lovelace had established an international investment staff at the urging of his son, Jon Lovelace Jr. The establishment of the firm's first overseas research office in Geneva followed in 1962.

In 1958, Jon Lovelace Jr. introduced a new system of managing the firm's mutual funds and accounts. Rather than assign a portfolio to a single manager, he divided each portfolio among several managers. Each manager would share ideas with peers but have total discretion over a section of the portfolio. Known today as The Capital System, it avoids the phenomenon of creating single-manager "stars," who can impact a fund's results should they leave. In the mid-1960s, Capital began to include research analysts in the management of the portfolios, reserving a portion of each to allow analysts to pursue their highest conviction investment ideas.

Capital Group's long-term approach has helped it avoid some of the pitfalls that have plagued other firms. In the late 1990s, the firm was criticized for not offering then-popular tech funds. But when the tech bubble burst, Capital was praised for not jumping on the bandwagon.

Philip May, husband of former British PM Theresa May, has worked as a relationship manager for the Capital Group.

== Investments ==
As of 2019, Capital Group held 5% of BAE Systems, 9% of British American Tobacco, and 15.28% of ASML Holding.

== Leadership ==
Mike Gitlin became CEO in 2023.

== Strategies ==
Funds typically have between three and 13 managers, each managing a portion of the portfolio independently to reduce key person risk and provide diversity of thought. In addition to financial research, the managers may do on-the-ground due diligence, and in 2018 logged 12,400 visits to facilities such as factories. It has three independent divisions focused on equities: Capital World Investors, Capital Research Global Investors and Capital International Investors, as well as one focused on bonds, Capital Fixed Income Investors.

According to the Wall Street Journal, Capital Group has historically been known for a disciplined approach to investing. The Journal noted that it was therefore surprising that in 2025, Capital Group was investing heavily in cryptocurrency. The push to invest in cryptocurrency was primarily driven by one of Capital Group's top portfolio managers, Mark Casey.

=== Funds ===
As of 2019, Capital Group had 36 mutual funds, which operate under their American Funds banner and had about US$1.9 trillion under management. Growth Fund of America, founded in 1973, was the largest actively-managed fund as of 2020 with around $150 billion.

In 2022, Capital Group introduced a suite of six exchange traded funds, five focused on equities and one focused on bonds and other fixed income.

== Ownership ==
As of 2019, the company is owned by 450 partners.

== Offices ==
Capital Group employs more than 7,500 associates worldwide. North American locations include Atlanta, Los Angeles, San Antonio, Indianapolis, New York, San Francisco, Toronto and Washington, D.C. As part of expansion plans in Europe, Capital Group established a presence in Frankfurt, Madrid, Milan and Zurich, adding to its offices in Geneva, London and Luxembourg. Its Asia offices include Beijing, Hong Kong, Mumbai, Singapore and Tokyo. Capital Group also has a growing presence in Sydney.
