= Tallassee, Alabama =

City in Alabama, United States

Tallassee
- City
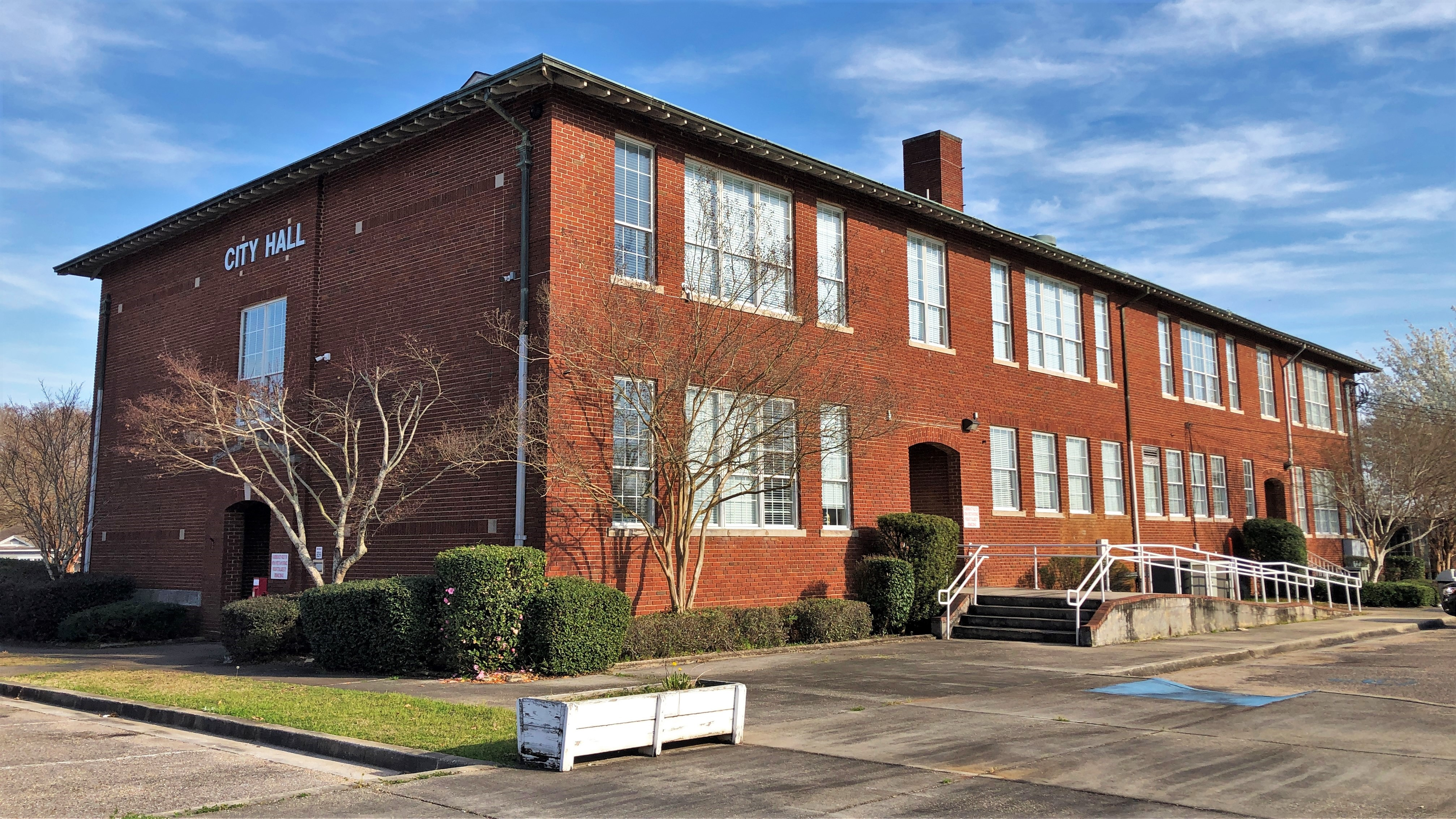
- Tallassee City Hall in 2021

- Seal
- Nickname: "Treasure on the Tallapoosa"
- Location of Tallassee in Elmore County and Tallapoosa County, Alabama.
- Coordinates: 32°30′28″N 85°52′30″W
- Country: United States
- State: Alabama
- Counties: Elmore, Tallapoosa
- Incorporated: October 24, 1835

Government
  - Mayor: Joey Wiginton

Area
  - Total: 12.19 sq mi (31.58 km^{2})
  - Land: 11.37 sq mi (29.44 km^{2})
  - Water: 0.83 sq mi (2.14 km^{2})
- Elevation: 299 ft (91 m)

Population (2020)
  - Total: 4,763
  - Density: 419.0/sq mi (161.77/km^{2})
- Time zone: UTC-6 (CST)
  - Summer (DST): UTC-5 (CST)
- ZIP codes: 36045, 36078
- Area code: 334
- FIPS code: 01-74688
- GNIS feature ID: 2405565
- Website: www.tallasseeal.gov

Tallassee (pronounced /ˈtæləsi/) is a city on the Tallapoosa River, located in both Elmore and Tallapoosa counties in the U.S. state of Alabama. At the 2020 census, the population was 4,763. It is home to a major hydroelectric power plant at Thurlow Dam operated by Alabama Power Company.

Tallassee is part of the Montgomery Metropolitan Area.

== History ==
=== Creek Wars and Indian removal ===
The historic Creek peoples in this area are believed to have descended from the Mississippian culture, which flourished throughout the Mississippi and Ohio River valleys and the Southeast from about 1000 to 1450. They were mound builders who created massive earthwork mounds as structures for political and religious purposes. They relied greatly on fishing and riverway trading at their major sites (cf. Moundville, Tuscaloosa).

Talisi (which means "Old Town" in the Creek language) was a town of the Coosa Province of the Mississippian culture; it was visited in 1540 by Hernando de Soto and his expedition through the Southeast. Later it was occupied by the historic Creek people. The Tallassee area was the location of the Creek capital city, Tukabatchee, as well as the location of the seven sacred plates.

Tensions first broke out as a civil war among the Creek, but US forces also got involved. Trying to intercept a Red Sticks party who were bringing back arms thought to be purchased from the Spanish in Florida, United States Army forces attacked the Creek at the Battle of Burnt Corn. The Creek band ultimately defeated the soldiers. In retaliation, the next month the Red Sticks attacked Fort Mims, about 35 miles north of Mobile, Alabama, killing most of the more than 500 settlers and mixed-race Lower Creek who had taken refuge there.

Osceola is believed to have been born in Talisi, to a full-blooded Creek mother and a half-Scottish father. He was among those Creek who migrated to Florida after the Creek War and joined the Seminole Indians. He became a prominent leader who continued resistance to US forces and settlement.

The Creek Wars (1813–1814) were marked by mutual raids, civilian massacres, and scalpings by both sides. The last major battle was at Horseshoe Bend in 1814 on the banks of the Tallapoosa River. Led by then-General Andrew Jackson, a coalition of militia from Alabama, Tennessee and Georgia, federal troops, Lower Creek, and Cherokee crushed the outnumbered and out-gunned Red Sticks. Jackson counted the conflict as among his politically strategic victories; it increased his popularity for later election to the presidency and his future policies of Indian removal.

After their defeat, many Creek migrated to Indian Territory, while some went into hiding with other resistant Indians in the Southeast, including the Cherokee and the Seminole tribes in Florida. The Creek who relocated from the Tuckabatchee area named a new settlement Talisi in Indian Territory. It was later known as Tulsa, Oklahoma.

=== American Civil War ===
"Tallassee sent her fair share, and more, of her sons to fight for the Confederacy and a Tallassee textile manufacturer, Barnett, Micou, and Company, supplied cloth for Confederate uniforms and tents, leased land and a building for production of a Confederate carbine, and produced supplies, laborers, and rations for the Armory, its employees, and officers." In June 1864 the Confederate army moved the Richmond Carbine Factory from Virginia to an old Tallassee cotton mill. It began manufacturing the carbines. During the course of the American Civil War, the town of Tallassee was never attacked by Union forces, except for their one attempt to destroy the Tallassee Mill. Tallassee Armory was the only Confederate one not destroyed during the war. Gen. Josiah Gorgas, ordnance officer who was Chief of the Confederate Ordnance Bureau, sought to relocate the Richmond Carbine factory to a more secure site. Tallassee know for small cotton mill community, appeared to fulfill his requirements. The town remote location offered a reduced risk of enemy attack, and Colonel Gorgas recognized the potential for an inexhaustible power supply from the adjacent river.

=== Mills ===
"In 1900, the Tallassee Falls Manufacturing Company became a part of the Mount Vernon-Woodberry Cotton Duck Company. This company was formed by the consolidation of the Columbia Duck Mills, Columbia, South Carolina; the Mount Vernon Company and the Woodberry Manufacturing Company, Baltimore, Maryland: and the Tallassee Falls Manufacturing Company, Tallassee, Alabama. Besides these were included two small mills in Maryland and one in Connecticut. The new company comprises a total of fourteen plants and 227,000 spindles." "Child labor was common in the Tallassee Mills, as in thousands of American industrial plants, until the 1930s. " "The Houses on King Street, numbered 1, 3, and 5, today occupied by Ray Carr, Houston Blount, and Frazier Elliot, were built about 1863 for the families of the confederate officers in charge of the armory and those in charge of the mill." The Mount Vernon Mill in Tallassee was completely destroyed by a fire on May 5, 2016.

"The Tallassee National Guard Company served in World War I, and a community library was established in 1921. During WWII, the mills received awards of excellence from the U.S. Army for production of war materials."

== Political history ==
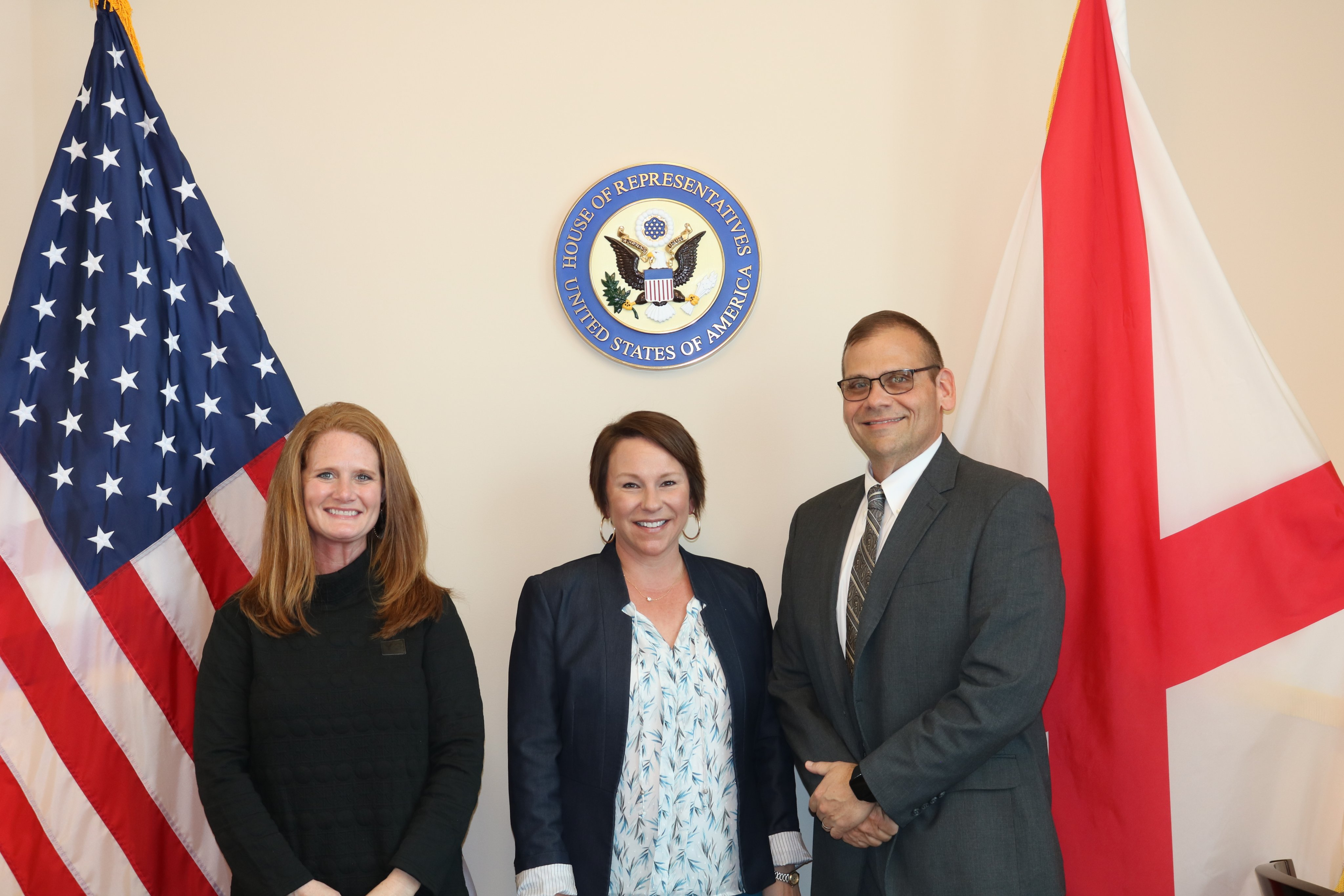
Johnny Hammock with his wife, Kimberly Hammock (left) and Congressmember Martha Roby in 2020.

Robert E. Payne served as Tallassee's mayor for 24 years, making him the longest-tenured mayor in the city's history. Payne ran for mayor in 1988 and won in a highly contested race against incumbent Thomas Pollard. Chamber of Commerce Director George McCain won against Pollard in 2008. Payne entered the race in 2012 to reclaim his seat and won. Johnny Hammock was elected mayor in 2016 following Payne's retirement. During his tenure, Hammock investigated cases of potential Paycheck Protection Program (PPP) loan fraud. Though not directly attributed to him, at least one case of PPP fraud in Tallassee during his term has made its way to prosecution. These actions sparked conflict between some city council members and the mayor. Hammock resigned effective June 30, 2022. Mayor Sarah Hill, then the Ward 2 city councilwoman, was appointed mayor in his place.

== Geography ==
According to the U.S. Census Bureau, the city has a total area of 10.2 square miles (26 km^{2}), of which 9.6 square miles (25 km^{2}) is land and 0.5 square miles (1.4 km^{2}, 5.21%) is water.

Tallassee is located in the densely forested Emerald Mountains, a small southeastern chain of the Lower Appalachians. It is bordered by two major rivers: the Coosa River to the west, and the Tallapoosa in the east. The Tallapoosa River also serves as the dividing line between two counties and towns: the City of Tallassee (Elmore County) and East Tallassee (Tallapoosa County).

The Alabama Power Company began to develop the Tallapoosa River in 1923 and in the following ten years three power plants built by the Alabama Power Company were built along the Tallapoosa River. Composed of the Thurlow Dam, the Yates Dam, and Martin Dam, these power plants have a combined capacity of 269,000 horsepower.

Tallassee is served by State Highway 14, which runs northwest-northeast through the town, and State Highway 229, which runs northwest–south. AL-14 leads east 15 mi (24 km) to Notasulga and west 22 mi (35 km) to Wetumpka. AL-229 leads north 15 mi (24 km) to Alabama State Route 63 northeast of Wetumpka, and south 8 mi (13 km) to Interstate 85 at exit 26.

Tallassee Municipal Airport serves general aviation.

=== Climate ===
Tallassee's climate is characterized by hot, humid summers and generally mild to cool winters. According to the Köppen Climate Classification system, Tallassee has a humid subtropical climate, abbreviated "Cfa" on climate maps.

== Demographics ==
Historical population
| Census | Pop. | Note | %± |
|---|---|---|---|
| 1880 | 1,182 | | — |
| 1890 | 1,413 | | 19.5% |
| 1910 | 1,347 | | — |
| 1920 | 2,034 | | 51.0% |
| 1930 | 843 | | −58.6% |
| 1940 | 1,011 | | 19.9% |
| 1950 | 4,225 | | 317.9% |
| 1960 | 4,934 | | 16.8% |
| 1970 | 4,809 | | −2.5% |
| 1980 | 4,763 | | −1.0% |
| 1990 | 5,112 | | 7.3% |
| 2000 | 4,934 | | −3.5% |
| 2010 | 4,819 | | −2.3% |
| 2020 | 4,763 | | −1.2% |
U.S. Decennial Census; 2013 Estimate

=== 2020 census ===
As of the 2020 census, Tallassee had a population of 4,763. The median age was 41.5 years. 22.3% of residents were under the age of 18 and 20.7% of residents were 65 years of age or older. For every 100 females there were 86.5 males, and for every 100 females age 18 and over there were 82.4 males age 18 and over.

0.0% of residents lived in urban areas, while 100.0% lived in rural areas.

There were 1,936 households in Tallassee, of which 32.4% had children under the age of 18 living in them. Of all households, 35.5% were married-couple households, 20.9% were households with a male householder and no spouse or partner present, and 37.9% were households with a female householder and no spouse or partner present. About 31.9% of all households were made up of individuals and 13.8% had someone living alone who was 65 years of age or older.

There were 2,195 housing units, of which 11.8% were vacant. The homeowner vacancy rate was 2.6% and the rental vacancy rate was 7.1%.

Tallassee racial composition
| Race | Num. | Perc. |
|---|---|---|
| White (non-Hispanic) | 3,277 | 68.8% |
| Black or African American (non-Hispanic) | 1,104 | 23.18% |
| Native American | 12 | 0.25% |
| Asian | 33 | 0.69% |
| Pacific Islander | 2 | 0.04% |
| Other/Mixed | 200 | 4.2% |
| Hispanic or Latino | 135 | 2.83% |

=== 2010 census ===
As of the census of 2010, there were 4,819 people, 1,931 households, and 1,252 families residing in the city. The population density was 472.5 inhabitants per square mile (182.4/km^{2}). There were 2,284 housing units at an average density of 223.9 per square mile (86.4/km^{2}). The racial makeup of the city was 72.4% White, 23.4% Black or African American, 0.4% Native American, 0.6% Asian, 0.1% Pacific Islander, 1.7% from other races, and 1.3% from two or more races. 3.0% of the population were Hispanic or Latino of any race.

There were 1,931 households, out of which 29.2% had children under the age of 18 living with them, 39.3% were married couples living together, 20.0% had a female householder with no husband present, and 35.2% were non-families. 30.9% of all households were made up of individuals, and 14.1% had someone living alone who was 65 years of age or older. The average household size was 2.44 and the average family size was 3.05.

In the city, the population was spread out, with 25.4% under the age of 18, 9.4% from 18 to 24, 23.6% from 25 to 44, 24.7% from 45 to 64, and 16.8% who were 65 years of age or older. The median age was 38.0 years. For every 100 females, there were 84.1 males. For every 100 females age 18 and over, there were 88.3 males.

The median income for a household in the city was $32,941, and the median income for a family was $56,910. Males had a median income of $35,658 versus $34,018 for females. The per capita income for the city was $17,944. About 12.5% of families and 17.2% of the population were below the poverty line, including 18.9% of those under age 18 and 14.2% of those age 65 or over.

=== 2000 census ===
As of the census of 2000, there were 4,934 people, 2,067 households, and 1,343 families residing in the city. The population density was 512.2 inhabitants per square mile (197.8/km^{2}). There were 2,367 housing units at an average density of 245.7 per square mile (94.9/km^{2}). The racial makeup of the city was 80.34% White, 17.61% Black or African American, 0.34% Native American, 0.30% Asian, 0.02% Pacific Islander, 0.18% from other races, and 1.20% from two or more races. 1.07% of the population were Hispanic or Latino of any race.

There were 2,067 households, out of which 28.3% had children under the age of 18 living with them, 45.0% were married couples living together, 16.0% had a female householder with no husband present, and 35.0% were non-families. 32.4% of all households were made up of individuals, and 18.4% had someone living alone who was 65 years of age or older. The average household size was 2.33 and the average family size was 2.94.

In the city, the population was spread out, with 24.5% under the age of 18, 7.7% from 18 to 24, 24.3% from 25 to 44, 21.7% from 45 to 64, and 21.7% who were 65 years of age or older. The median age was 40 years. For every 100 females, there were 83.7 males. For every 100 females age 18 and over, there were 78.4 males.

The median income for a household in the city was $23,946, and the median income for a family was $32,015. Males had a median income of $27,313 versus $22,993 for females. The per capita income for the city was $14,859. About 16.9% of families and 22.8% of the population were below the poverty line, including 31.5% of those under age 18 and 19.9% of those age 65 or over.

== Media and communications ==
=== Newspapers ===
The Tallassee Tribune has been the weekly newspaper publication in Tallassee since 1899. The newspaper started as the Tri-County Weekly in 1899, was later renamed the Tallassee Times, and then The Tallassee Tribune in 1912. The paper serves the people in and around the Tallassee area and is published every Wednesday.

Tallassee Times is an online publication launched in 2008. The weekly publication virtually has thousands of hits every week. In addition, there is a Tallassee Times TV webcam channel that features community events, such as Tallassee Tiger sports.

=== Radio ===
There are three radio stations that are located in Tallassee:

- WTLS (1300 AM / 94.7 & 101.1 FM) News/Sports
- WALQ (1130 AM / 102.7 FM) Regional Mexican
- WQNR (99.9 FM) "Kate FM" is licensed to Tallassee and broadcasts from nearby Auburn, Alabama

== Education ==
The Tallassee City School District serves all of the portions of the city in Elmore County, and most of the portions of the city in Tallapoosa County. A portion of the Tallapoosa County section of Tallassee is in the Tallapoosa County Schools.

The city school system, established in 1915, operates three schools (Tallassee High School, Southside Middle School, and Tallassee Elementary School). The school system serves about 2,000 students, and employs approximately 112 teachers within the elementary school, middle school, and high school. The majority of families living in the city of Tallassee attend Tallassee City Schools.

== Healthcare ==
The Community Hospital, established in 1926, provides healthcare to the surrounding three counties (Elmore, Tallapoosa, and Macon). The hospital is a nonprofit organization with sixty-nine beds.

== Notable people ==
- Derrick Ansley, NFL coach
- Antoine Caldwell, NFL player
- Ned Cobb, sharecropper
- Peter McQueen, Creek Indian chief, prophet, trader, and warrior
- Mike Morgan, former NFL running back
- Opothleyahola, Creek Indian chief
- Osceola, leader of the Seminole people in Florida
- Michael Ritch, professional soccer player
- Charles Davis Tillman, singer-songwriter who helped form the southern gospel genre
- Demond Washington, professional football player

== Photo gallery ==
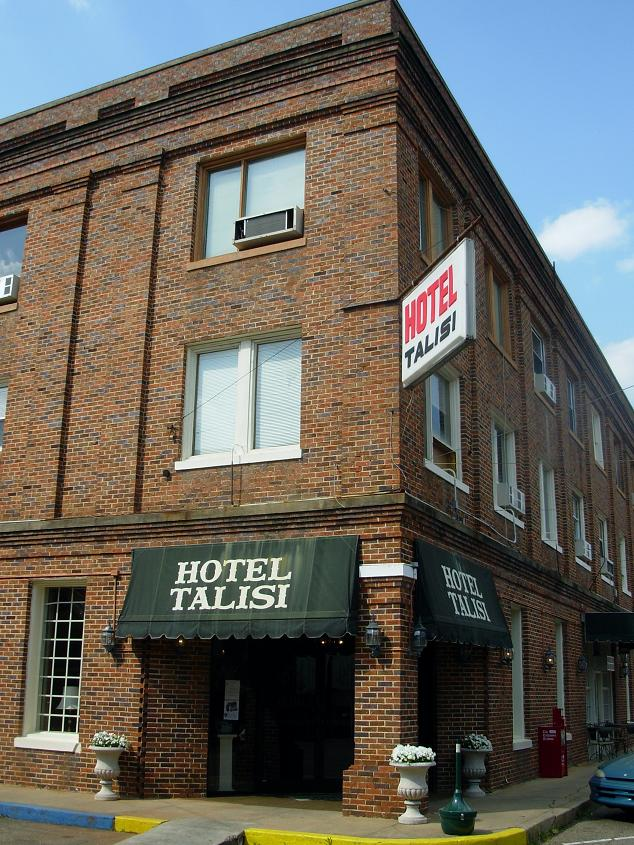
The historic Hotel Talisi pictured in 2007.

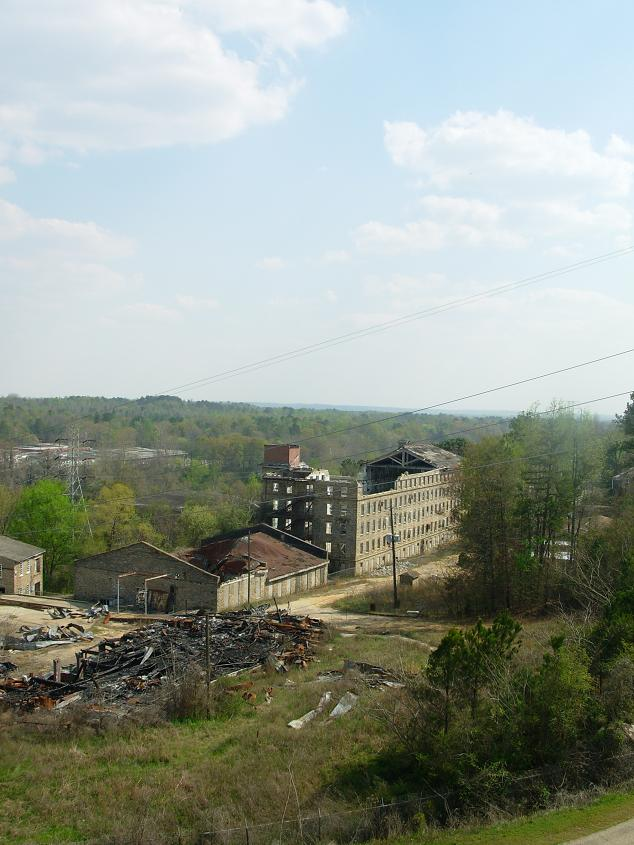
Built in 1844, the Tallassee cotton mill was converted into an armory for producing carbines during the American Civil War.

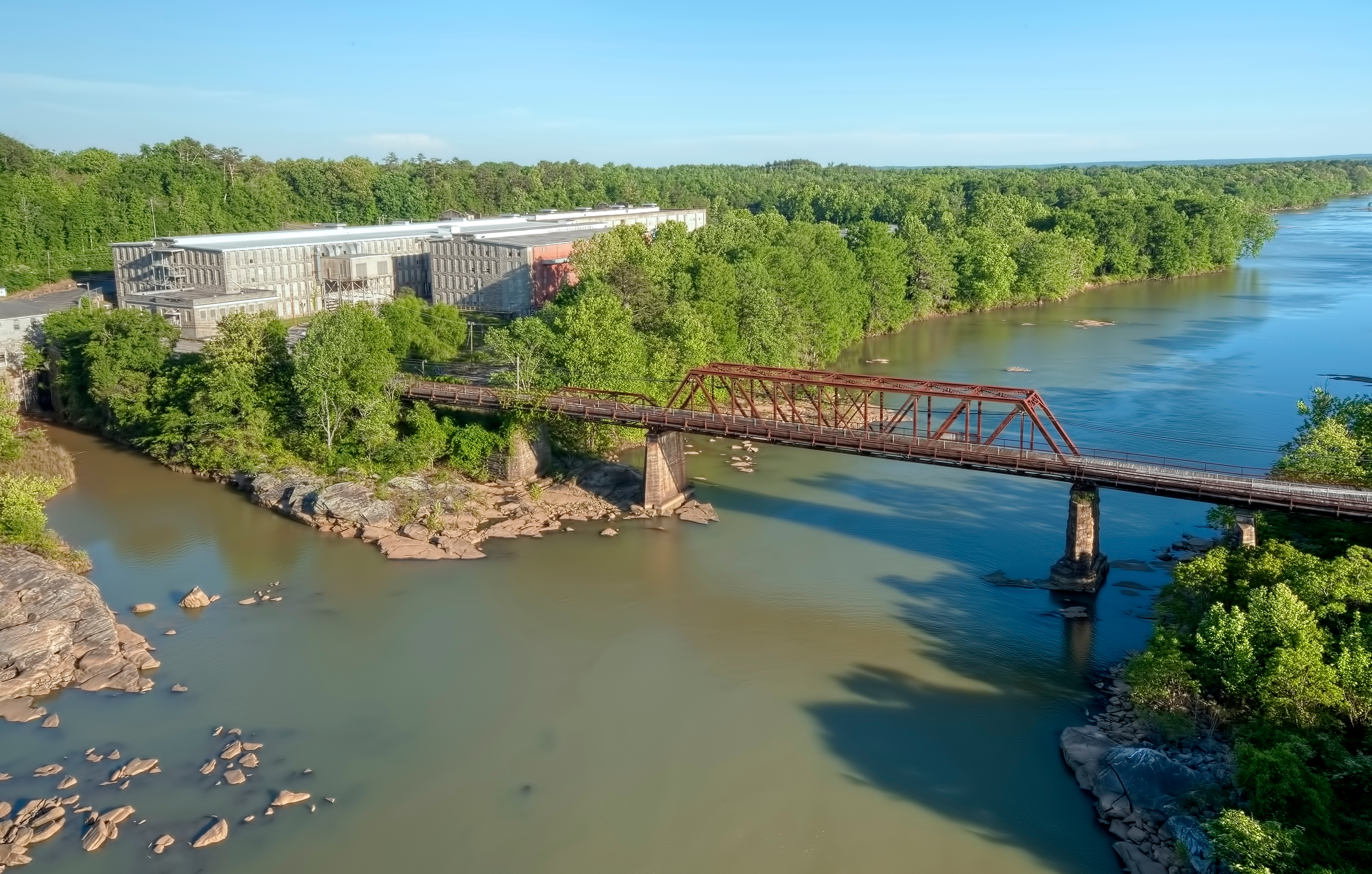
Mt. Vernon Mills on the east side of the Tallapoosa River pictured in 2010.

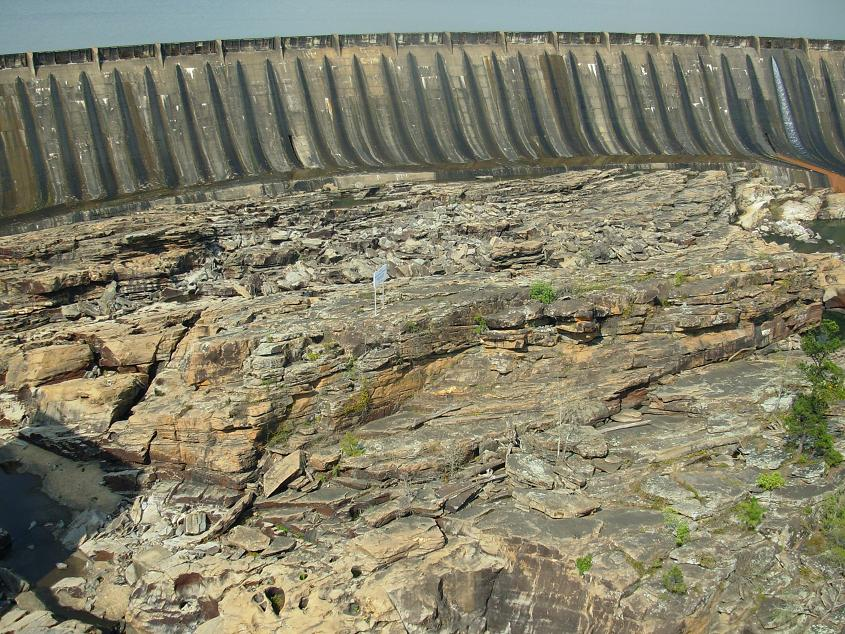
Thurlow Dam was built by the Alabama Power Company in 1931.

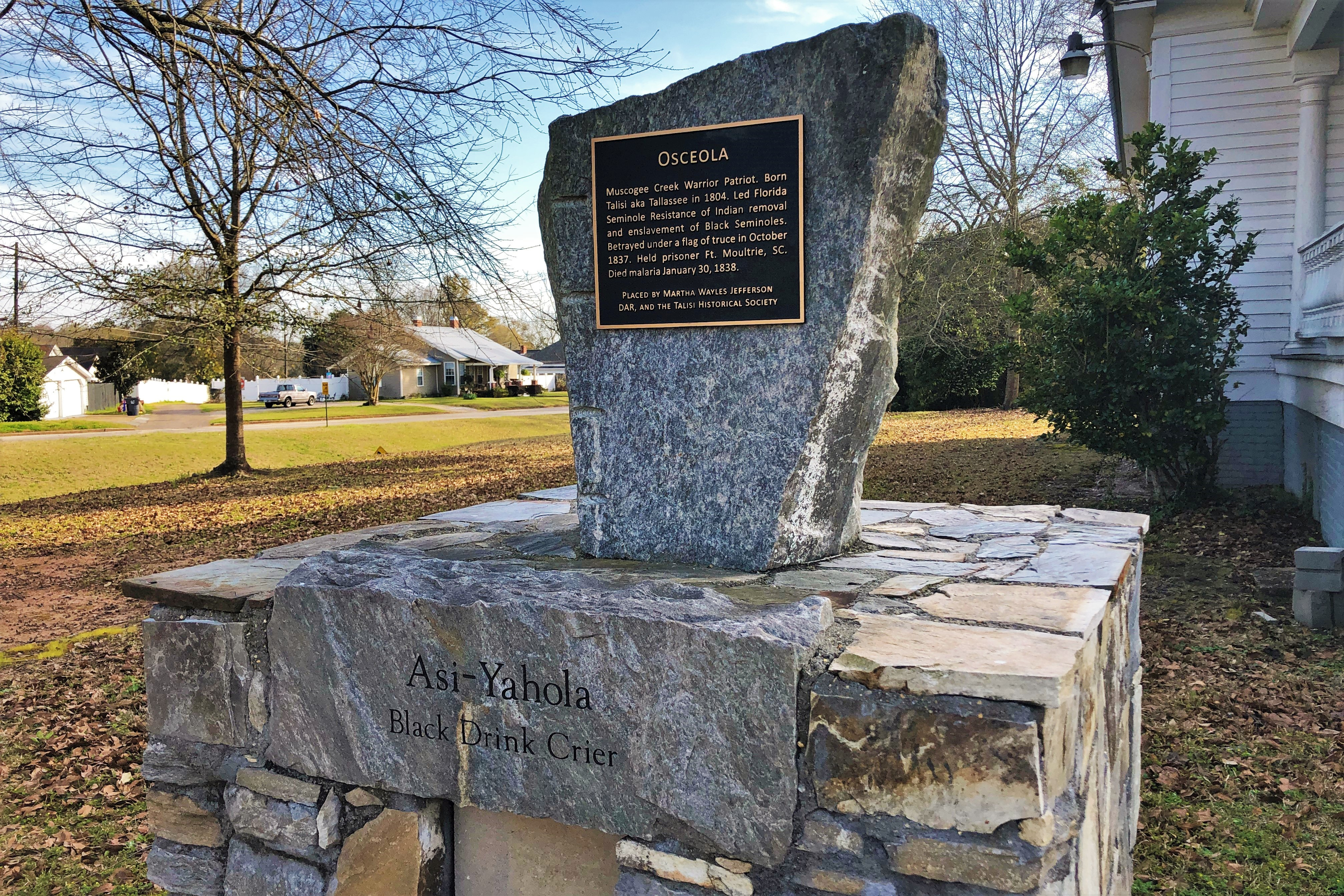
Historical monument near the birthplace of Osceola, a leader of the Seminole people.
