= 1870 in the United States =

- Decades: 1850s; 1860s; 1870s; 1880s; 1890s
- See also: History of the United States (1865–1918); Timeline of United States history (1860–1899); List of years in the United States

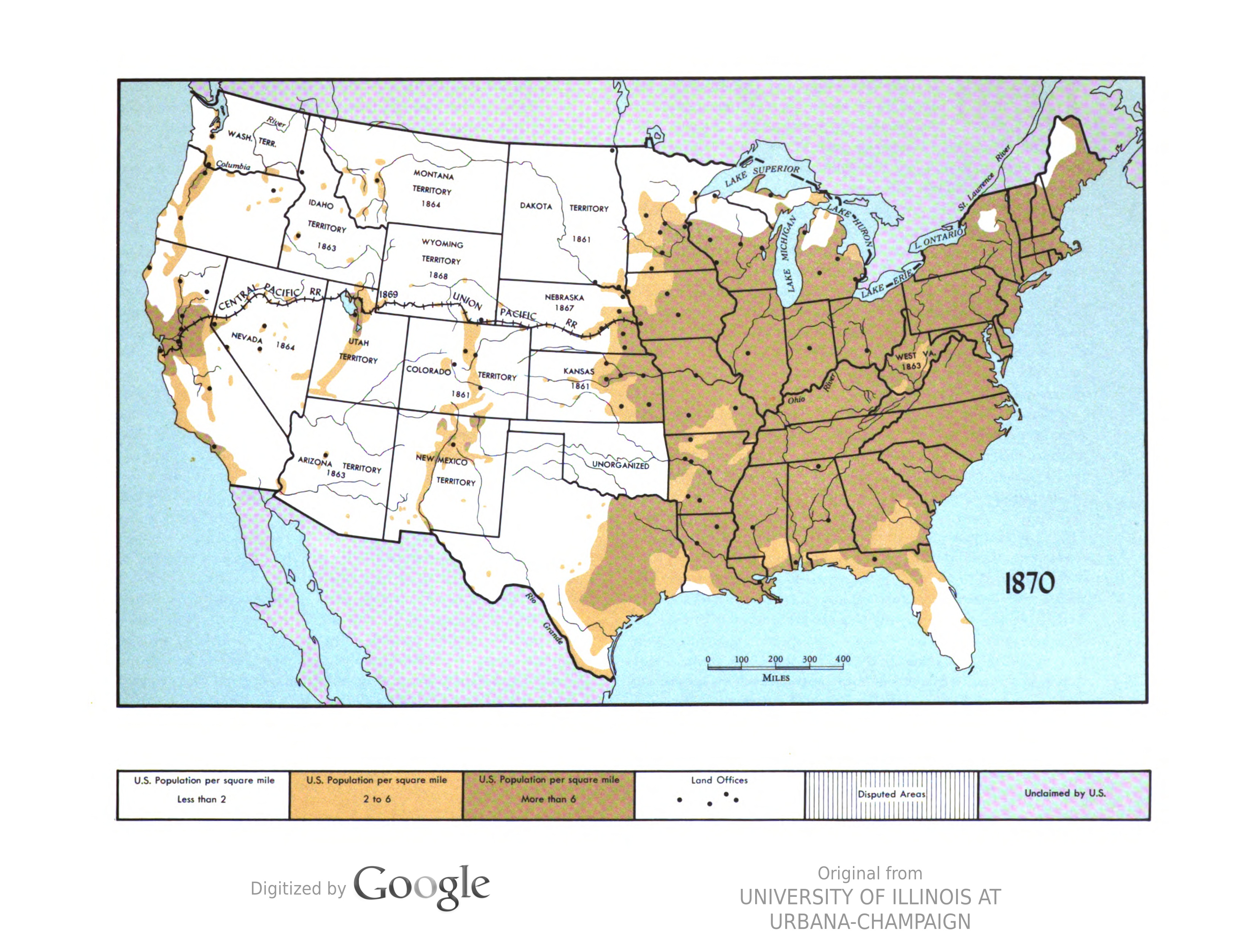
1870 in the United States

Events from the year 1870 in the United States.

== Incumbents ==
=== Federal government ===
- President: Ulysses S. Grant (R-Illinois)
- Vice President: Schuyler Colfax (R-Indiana)
- Chief Justice: Salmon P. Chase (Ohio)
- Speaker of the House of Representatives: James G. Blaine (R-Maine)
- Congress: 41st

==== State governments ====
Governors and lieutenant governors

=== Governors ===
- Governor of Alabama: William Hugh Smith (Republican) (until November 26), Robert B. Lindsay (Democratic) (starting November 26)
- Governor of Arkansas: Powell Clayton (Republican)
- Governor of California: Henry Huntly Haight (Democratic)
- Governor of Connecticut: Marshall Jewell (Republican) (until May 4), James E. English (Democratic) (starting May 4)
- Governor of Delaware: Gove Saulsbury (Democratic)
- Governor of Florida: Harrison Reed (Republican)
- Governor of Georgia: Rufus Bullock (Republican)
- Governor of Illinois: John M. Palmer (Republican)
- Governor of Indiana: Conrad Baker (Republican)
- Governor of Iowa: Samuel Merrill (Republican)
- Governor of Kansas: James M. Harvey (Republican)
- Governor of Kentucky: John W. Stevenson (Democratic)
- Governor of Louisiana: Henry C. Warmoth (Republican)
- Governor of Maine: Joshua Chamberlain (Republican)
- Governor of Maryland: Oden Bowie (Democratic)
- Governor of Massachusetts: William Claflin (Republican)
- Governor of Michigan: Henry P. Baldwin (Republican)
- Governor of Minnesota: William R. Marshall (Republican) (until January 9), Horace Austin (Republican) (starting January 9)
- Governor of Mississippi: Adelbert Ames (Military) (until March 10), James L. Alcorn (Republican) (starting March 10)
- Governor of Missouri: Joseph W. McClurg (Republican)
- Governor of Nebraska: David Butler (Republican)
- Governor of Nevada: Henry G. Blasdel (Republican)
- Governor of New Hampshire: Onslow Stearns (Republican)
- Governor of New Jersey: Theodore Fitz Randolph (Democratic)
- Governor of New York: John Thompson Hoffman (Democratic)
- Governor of North Carolina: William Woods Holden (Republican) (until December 15), Tod Robinson Caldwell (Republican) (starting December 15)
- Governor of Ohio: Rutherford B. Hayes (Republican)
- Governor of Oregon: George L. Woods (Republican) (until September 14), La Fayette Grover (Democratic) (starting September 14)
- Governor of Pennsylvania: John W. Geary (Republican)
- Governor of Rhode Island: Seth Padelford (Republican)
- Governor of South Carolina: Robert Kingston Scott (Republican)
- Governor of Tennessee: Dewitt Clinton Senter (Republican)
- Governor of Texas: vacant (until January 8), Edmund J. Davis (Republican) (starting January 8)
- Governor of Vermont:
  - until February 7: Peter T. Washburn (Republican)
  - February 7-October 6: George W. Hendee (Republican)
  - starting October 6: John W. Stewart (Republican)
- Governor of Virginia: Gilbert Carlton Walker (Democratic)
- Governor of West Virginia: William E. Stevenson (Republican)
- Governor of Wisconsin: Lucius Fairchild (Republican)

=== Lieutenant governors ===
- Lieutenant Governor of Alabama:
  - until August 21: Andrew J. Applegate (Republican)
  - August 21-November 26: vacant
  - starting November 26: Edward H. Moren (Democratic)
- Lieutenant Governor of Arkansas: James M. Johnson (Republican)
- Lieutenant Governor of California: William Holden (Democratic)
- Lieutenant Governor of Connecticut: Francis Wayland III (Republican) (until May 4), Julius Hotchkiss (Democratic) (starting May 4)
- Lieutenant Governor of Florida:
  - until month and day unknown: William Henry Gleason (Republican)
  - month and day unknown: Edmund C. Weeks (Republican)
  - starting month and day unknown: vacant
- Lieutenant Governor of Illinois: John Dougherty (Republican)
- Lieutenant Governor of Indiana: William Cumback (Republican)
- Lieutenant Governor of Iowa: John Scott (Republican) (until month and day unknown), Madison Miner Walden (Republican) (starting month and day unknown)
- Lieutenant Governor of Kansas: Charles Vernon Eskridge (Republican)
- Lieutenant Governor of Kentucky: vacant
- Lieutenant Governor of Louisiana: Oscar J. Dunn (Republican)
- Lieutenant Governor of Massachusetts: Joseph Tucker (Republican)
- Lieutenant Governor of Michigan: Morgan Bates (Republican)
- Lieutenant Governor of Minnesota: Thomas H. Armstrong (Republican) (until January 7), William H. Yale (Republican) (starting January 7)
- Lieutenant Governor of Mississippi: Ridgley C. Powers (Republican) (starting month and day unknown)
- Lieutenant Governor of Missouri: Edwin Obed Stanard (Republican)
- Lieutenant Governor of Nevada: James S. Slingerland (political party unknown)
- Lieutenant Governor of New York: Allen C. Beach (Democratic)
- Lieutenant Governor of North Carolina: Tod R. Caldwell (Republican)
- Lieutenant Governor of Ohio: John C. Lee (Republican)
- Lieutenant Governor of Rhode Island: Pardon Stevens (political party unknown)
- Lieutenant Governor of South Carolina: Lemuel Boozer (Republican) (until December 3), Alonzo J. Ransier (Republican) (starting December 3)
- Lieutenant Governor of Tennessee: Dorsey B. Thomas (Democratic)
- Lieutenant Governor of Texas: vacant
- Lieutenant Governor of Vermont:
  - until February 7: George W. Hendee (Republican)
  - February 7-October 6: vacant
  - starting October 6: George N. Dale (Republican)
- Lieutenant Governor of Virginia: John F. Lewis (Republican) (until January 1), John Lawrence Marye, Jr. (Conservative) (starting January 1)
- Lieutenant Governor of Wisconsin: Wyman Spooner (Republican) (until January 3), Thaddeus C. Pound (Republican) (starting January 3)

== Events ==
=== January–March ===
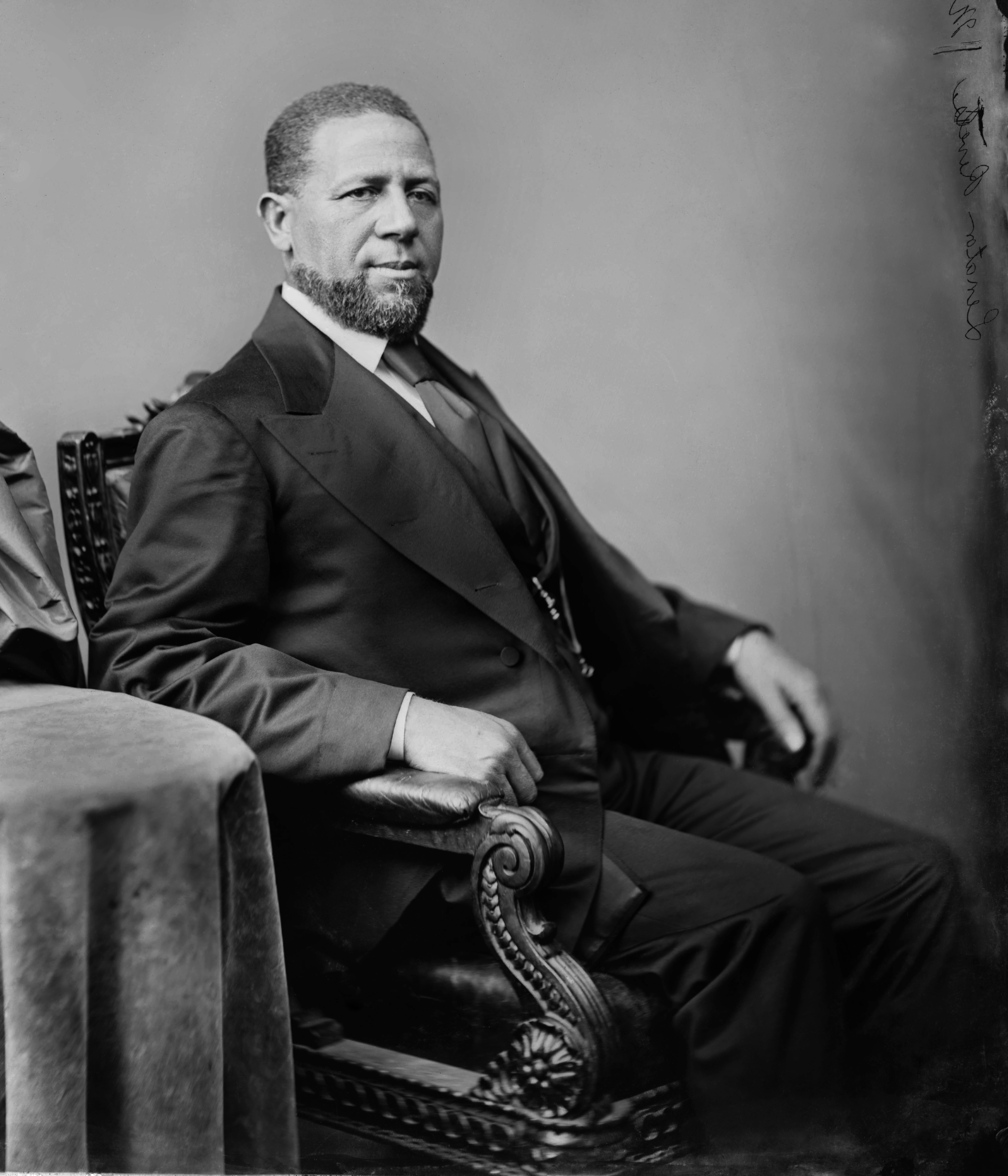
February 25: Hiram Rhodes Revels, the first African American congressman.

- January 1 – Plans for the Brooklyn Bridge are completed.
- January 3 – Construction of the Brooklyn Bridge begins.
- January 10 – John D. Rockefeller incorporates Standard Oil.
- January 15 – A political cartoon for the first time symbolizes the United States Democratic Party with a donkey ("A Live Jackass Kicking a Dead Lion" by Thomas Nast for Harper's Weekly).
- January 26 – Reconstruction: Virginia rejoins the Union.
- January 27 – The first college sorority, Kappa Alpha Theta, is established at DePauw University.
- February 2 – The Cardiff Giant is proven a hoax.
- February 3 – The Fifteenth Amendment to the United States Constitution, guaranteeing African-American males the right to vote, is ratified.
- February 9 – The Weather Bureau, later renamed the National Weather Service, is established.
- February 10
  - Anaheim, California is incorporated.
  - The YWCA is founded in New York City.
- February 12 – Women gain the right to vote in Utah Territory. On February 14, in a Salt Lake City municipal election, Seraph Young Ford becomes the first woman in the U.S. to cast her vote.
- February 23 – Military control of Mississippi ends and it is readmitted to the Union.
- February 25 – Hiram Rhodes Revels, a Republican from Mississippi, is sworn into the United States Senate, becoming the first African American ever to sit in the U.S. Congress.
- February 26
  - In New York City, the first pneumatic subway is opened.
  - Wyatt Outlaw, the first African American town commissioner in Graham, North Carolina, is lynched by mob of Ku Klux Klan on Alamance County courthouse square.
- March 19 – The Ohio Legislature passes the Cannon Act, thereby establishing the Ohio Agriculture and Mechanical College, later Ohio State University.
- March 24 – Syracuse University is established and officially opens.
- March 30
  - The Fifteenth Amendment to the United States Constitution, giving black Americans the right to vote, is proclaimed by Secretary of State Hamilton Fish.
  - Texas is readmitted to the Union following Reconstruction.
- March 31 – Thomas Mundy Peterson is the first African-American to vote in an election.

=== April–June ===
- April – The Chicago Base Ball Club, later to be known as the Chicago White Stockings, and ultimately the Chicago Cubs, play their first game against the St. Louis Unions of the National Association of Base Ball Players, an amateur league.
- May 2 – William J. Seymour, one of the two Primary Founders of American Pentecostalism was born.
- June 23 – The U.S. Congress creates the United States Department of Justice.
- June 26 – Christmas is declared a federal holiday in the United States.
- June 28 – Congress creates federal holidays (New Year's Day, Independence Day, Thanksgiving Day, and Christmas Day), initially applicable only to federal employees.

=== July–September ===
- July 1 – United States Department of Justice is established.
- July 15 – Reconstruction: Georgia becomes the last former Confederate state to be readmitted to the Union, and the C.S.A. is dissolved.
- August 15 – Transcontinental Railroad completed in Colorado.
- August 17 – First documented climb to summit of Mount Rainier by Medal of Honor winner General Hazard Stevens with P. B. Van Trump.
- September 6 – Louisa Ann Swain of Laramie, Wyoming, becomes the first woman in the United States to cast a general election vote legally since 1807.
- September 18 – Old Faithful Geyser is observed and named by Henry D. Washburn during the Washburn-Langford-Doane Expedition to Yellowstone.

=== October–December ===
- October 25 – Eutaw riot: A white mob attacks a group of black citizens, killing as many as four of them, in Eutaw, Alabama.
- November 1 – The newly created Weather Bureau makes its first official meteorological forecast: "High winds at Chicago and Milwaukee... and along the Lakes".
- November 8 – Robert B. Lindsay is elected the 22nd governor of Alabama defeating William Hugh Smith.
- November 26 – Robert B. Lindsay is sworn in as the 22nd governor of Alabama replacing William Hugh Smith.
- December 12 – Joseph H. Rainey of South Carolina becomes the second black U.S. congressman (following Hiram Rhodes Revels in February).

=== Undated ===
- Underwood Constitution: A controversial revised Constitution of Virginia goes into effect following a drafting convention dominated by the Radical Republicans led by John Underwood.

=== Ongoing ===
- Reconstruction era (1865–1877)
- Gilded Age (1869–c. 1896)

== Births ==
- January 9 – Joseph Strauss, bridge engineer (died 1938)
- January 11 – Alexander Stirling Calder, sculptor (died 1945)
- January 13 – Ross Granville Harrison, physiologist (died 1959)
- January 23 – William G. Morgan, inventor of volleyball (died 1942)
- February 20 – Jay Johnson Morrow, military engineer and politician, 3rd Governor of the Panama Canal Zone (died 1937)
- February 26 – John S. Cohen, U.S. Senator from Georgia from 1932 to 1933 (died 1935)
- March 5 – Frank Norris, journalist and naturalist novelist (died 1902)
- March 13
  - William Glackens, realist painter (died 1938)
  - Seale Harris, physician (died 1957)
- April 4
  - Curtis Hidden Page, New Hampshire educator and politician (died 1946)
  - George Albert Smith, president of the Church of Jesus Christ of Latter-day Saints (died 1951)
- April 17 – Ray Stannard Baker, journalist and modern historian (died 1946)
- May – Bert Wakefield, Negro leagues baseball player
- May 19 – Albert Fish, serial killer (died 1936)
- May 24 – Benjamin N. Cardozo, Associate Justice of the Supreme Court of the United States (died 1938)
- May 27 – Mary Curzon, Baroness Curzon of Kedleston, née Leiter, Viceregal-Consort of India (died 1905 in the United Kingdom)
- July 17 – Marie Louise Obenauer, labor laws pioneer (died 1947)
- July 25 – Maxfield Parrish, illustrator (died 1966)
- August 3 – Carrie Ingalls, younger sister of author Laura Ingalls Wilder (died 1946)
- August 14 – Nelson McDowell, actor (died 1947)
- August 20 – Edward Stanley Kellogg, 16th Governor of American Samoa (died 1948)
- August 25 – Mihran Kassabian, radiologist (died 1910)
- September 2 – James Bert Garner, chemical engineer and inventor (died 1960)
- September 21 – Elmer Darwin Ball, entomologist (died 1943)
- September 25 – James A. Hawken, schoolteacher (died 1964)
- September 30 – Thomas W. Lamont, banker (died 1948)
- October 7 – Uncle Dave Macon, banjo player and singer-songwriter (died 1952)
- November 2 – Joseph J. Sullivan, gambler (died 1949)
- December 12 – Walter Benona Sharp, oil pioneer (died 1912)
- December 23 – John Marin, modernist painter (died 1953)
- Robert Ames Bennet, Western and science fiction writer (died 1954)
- Zella de Milhau, artist, ambulance driver, community organizer and motorcycle policewoman (b. 1954)

== Deaths ==
- January 17 – Alexander Anderson, illustrator (born 1775)
- January 25 – David Bates, poet (born 1809)
- March 26 – Pierre Soulé, U.S. Senator from Louisiana in 1847 and from 1849 to 1853 (born 1801)
- March 28 – George Henry Thomas, general (born 1816)
- April 15 – Emma Willard, women's rights activist and educationalist (born 1787)
- April 26 – Zerah Colburn, locomotive designer and technical journalist (suicide) (born 1832)
- May 9 – Lawrence Brainerd, U.S. Senator from Vermont from 1854 to 1855 (born 1794)
- June 11 – William Gilmore Simms, Southern poet, novelist and historian (born 1806)
- June 17 – Jérôme Napoléon Bonaparte, agriculturalist, nephew of Napoleon I (born 1805 in the United Kingdom)
- July 13 – Daniel Sheldon Norton, U.S. Senator from Minnesota from 1865 to 1870 (born 1829)
- June 27 – Cyrus Kingsbury, Congregationalist missionary to Cherokee and Choctaw tribes (died in Choctaw Nation, Indian Territory)
- August 14 – David Farragut, flag officer of the United States Navy during the American Civil War (born 1801)
- September 12 – Fitz Hugh Ludlow, author and explorer (born 1836)
- October 3 – Joseph Mozier, sculptor best known for his work in Italy (born 1812)
- October 12
  - Stephen Greenleaf Bulfinch, minister and hymn writer (born 1809)
  - Robert E. Lee, General of the Army of Northern Virginia during the American Civil War (born 1807)
- November 24 – John Christian Jacobson, Moravian bishop
- December 5 – David Gouverneur Burnet, politician (born 1788)
- December 16 – Byron Kilbourn, surveyor, railroad executive and politician (born 1801)
- December 28 – Wilson Lumpkin, U.S. Senator from Georgia and Governor of Georgia from 1831 to 1835 (born 1783)

== See also ==
- Timeline of United States history (1860–1899)
