= 1872 in the United States =

- Decades: 1850s; 1860s; 1870s; 1880s; 1890s
- See also: History of the United States (1865–1918); Timeline of United States history (1860–1899); List of years in the United States

Events from the year 1872 in the United States.

== Incumbents ==
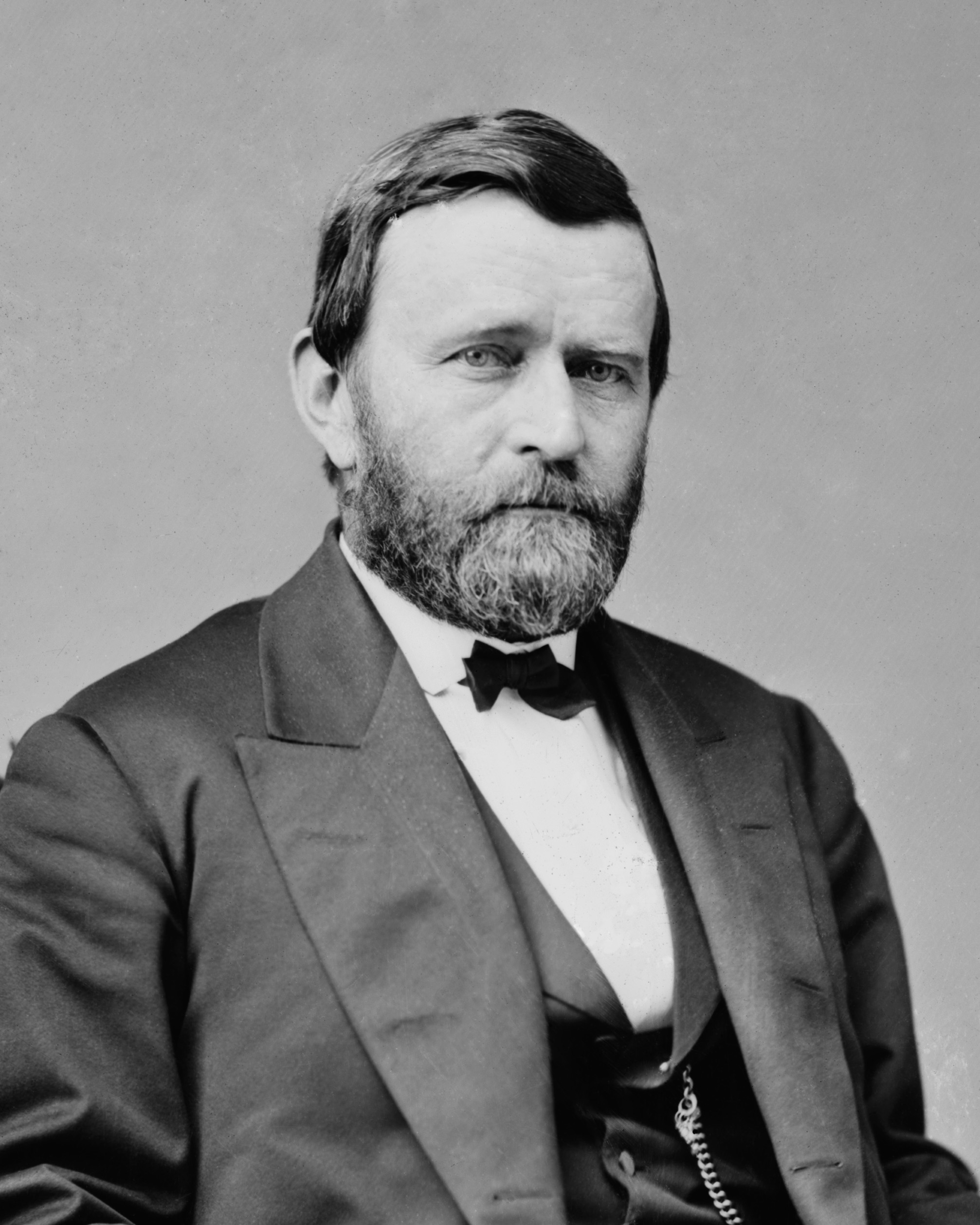
President Ulysses S. Grant by Mathew Brady c. 1870

=== Federal government ===
- President: Ulysses S. Grant (R-Illinois)
- Vice President: Schuyler Colfax (R-Indiana)
- Chief Justice: Salmon P. Chase (Ohio)
- Speaker of the House of Representatives: James G. Blaine (R-Maine)
- Congress: 42nd

==== State governments ====
Governors and lieutenant governors

=== Governors ===
- Governor of Alabama: Robert B. Lindsay (Democratic) (until November 17), David P. Lewis (Republican) (starting November 17)
- Governor of Arkansas: Ozra Amander Hadley (Republican)
- Governor of California: Newton Booth (Republican)
- Governor of Connecticut: Marshall Jewell (Republican)
- Governor of Delaware: James Ponder (Democratic)
- Governor of Florida: Harrison Reed (Republican)
- Governor of Georgia: Benjamin Conley (Republican) (until January 12), James M. Smith (Democratic) (starting January 12)
- Governor of Illinois: John M. Palmer (Republican)
- Governor of Indiana: Conrad Baker (Republican)
- Governor of Iowa: Samuel Merrill (Republican) (until January 11), Cyrus C. Carpenter (Republican) (starting January 11)
- Governor of Kansas: James M. Harvey (Republican)
- Governor of Kentucky: Preston H. Leslie (Democratic)
- Governor of Louisiana: Henry C. Warmoth (Republican) (until December 29), P. B. S. Pinchback (Republican) (starting December 29)
- Governor of Maine: Sidney Perham (Republican)
- Governor of Maryland: Oden Bowie (Democratic) (until January 10), William Pinkney Whyte (Democratic) (starting January 10)
- Governor of Massachusetts: William Claflin (Republican) (until January 4), William B. Washburn (Republican) (starting January 4)
- Governor of Michigan: Henry P. Baldwin (Republican)
- Governor of Minnesota: Horace Austin (Republican)
- Governor of Mississippi: Ridgley C. Powers (Republican)
- Governor of Missouri: B. Gratz Brown (Liberal Republican)
- Governor of Nebraska:William H. James (Republican)
- Governor of Nevada: Lewis R. Bradley (Democratic)
- Governor of New Hampshire: James A. Weston (Democratic) (until June 6), Ezekiel A. Straw (Republican) (starting June 6)
- Governor of New Jersey: Theodore Fitz Randolph (Democratic) (until January 16), Joel Parker (Democratic) (starting January 16)
- Governor of New York: John Thompson Hoffman (Democratic) (until end of December 31)
- Governor of North Carolina: Tod Robinson Caldwell (Republican)
- Governor of Ohio: Rutherford B. Hayes (Republican) (until January 8), Edward F. Noyes (Republican) (starting January 8)
- Governor of Oregon: La Fayette Grover (Democratic)
- Governor of Pennsylvania: John W. Geary (Republican)
- Governor of Rhode Island: Seth Padelford (Republican)
- Governor of South Carolina: Robert Kingston Scott (Republican) (until December 7), Franklin I. Moses, Jr. (Republican) (starting December 7)
- Governor of Tennessee: John C. Brown (Democratic)
- Governor of Texas: Edmund J. Davis (Republican)
- Governor of Vermont: John W. Stewart (Republican) (until October 3), Julius Converse (Republican) (starting October 3)
- Governor of Virginia: Gilbert Carlton Walker (Democratic)
- Governor of West Virginia: John J. Jacob (Democratic)/(Independent)
- Governor of Wisconsin: Lucius Fairchild (Republican) (until January 1), Cadwallader C. Washburn (Republican) (starting January 1)

=== Lieutenant governors ===
- Lieutenant Governor of Alabama: Edward H. Moren (Democratic) (until November 17), Alexander McKinstry (Republican) (starting November 17)
- Lieutenant Governor of Arkansas: vacant
- Lieutenant Governor of California: William Holden (Democratic) (until month and day unknown), Romualdo Pacheco (Republican) (starting month and day unknown)
- Lieutenant Governor of Connecticut: Julius Hotchkiss (Democratic) (until month and day unknown), Morris Tyler (Republican) (starting month and day unknown)
- Lieutenant Governor of Florida: Samuel T. Day (Republican) (until month and day unknown), vacant (starting month and day unknown)
- Lieutenant Governor of Illinois: John Dougherty (Republican)
- Lieutenant Governor of Indiana: William Cumback (Republican)
- Lieutenant Governor of Iowa: Madison Miner Walden (Republican) (until month and day unknown), Henry C. Bulis (Republican) (starting month and day unknown)
- Lieutenant Governor of Kansas: Peter Percival Elder (Republican)
- Lieutenant Governor of Kentucky: John G. Carlisle (Democratic)
- Lieutenant Governor of Louisiana: Oscar J. Dunn (Republican) (until November 22), P. B. S. Pinchback (Republican) (starting November 22)
- Lieutenant Governor of Massachusetts: Joseph Tucker (political party unknown)
- Lieutenant Governor of Michigan: Morgan Bates (Republican)
- Lieutenant Governor of Minnesota: William H. Yale (political party unknown)
- Lieutenant Governor of Mississippi: Alexander K. Davis (Republican)
- Lieutenant Governor of Missouri: Joseph J. Gravely (Liberal Republican) (until April 28), vacant (starting April 28)
- Lieutenant Governor of Nevada: Frank Denver (political party unknown)
- Lieutenant Governor of New York: Allen C. Beach (Democratic) (until end of December 31)
- Lieutenant Governor of North Carolina: vacant
- Lieutenant Governor of Ohio: John C. Lee (Republican) (until January 8), Jacob Mueller (Republican) (starting January 8)
- Lieutenant Governor of Rhode Island: Pardon Stevens (political party unknown) (until month and day unknown), Charles Cutler (political party unknown) (starting month and day unknown)
- Lieutenant Governor of South Carolina: Alonzo J. Ransier (Republican) (until December 7), Richard Howell Gleaves (Republican) (starting December 7)
- Lieutenant Governor of Tennessee: John C. Vaughn (Democratic)
- Lieutenant Governor of Texas: vacant
- Lieutenant Governor of Vermont: George N. Dale (Republican) (until October 3), Russell S. Taft (Republican) (starting October 3)
- Lieutenant Governor of Virginia: John Lawrence Marye, Jr. (Conservative)
- Lieutenant Governor of Wisconsin: Thaddeus C. Pound (Republican) (until January 1), Milton H. Pettit (Republican) (starting January 1)

== Events ==
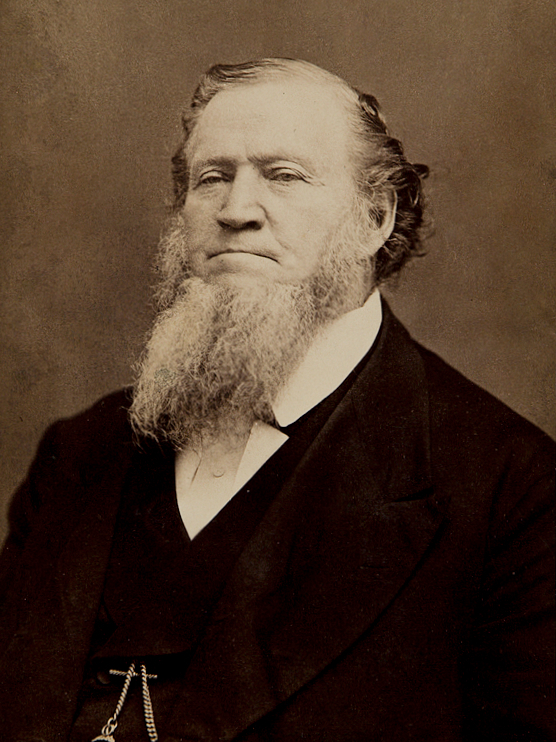
Brigham Young, photo circa 1870

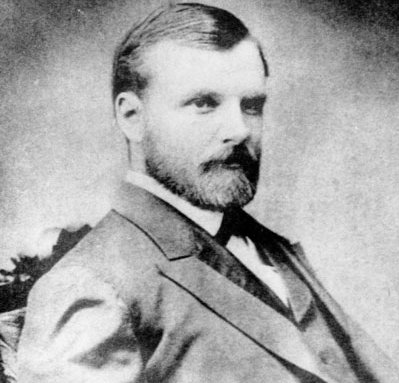
Clarence King (1842-1901) as a young man

- January 2 – Brigham Young is arrested for allegedly being an accessory to murder.
- January 3 – First patent list issued by the U.S. Patent Office.
- February 13 – Rex, the most famous parade on Mardi Gras, parades for the first time in New Orleans for Grand Duke Alexei Mikhailovich of Russia.
- February 20 – The Metropolitan Museum of Art opens in New York City.
- February 22 – The Prohibition Party holds its first national convention in Columbus, Ohio, nominating James Black as its presidential nominee.
- March – One of the first Personal Liberty League formed in the United States in response to the threat posed to the liquor industry by the growing political strength of the temperance movement.
- March 1 – Yellowstone National Park is established as the world's first national park.
- March 4 – The Boston Globe is founded in Boston, Massachusetts, as the largest newspaper of the New England region.
- March 5 – George Westinghouse patents the air brake for railroads.
- April 10 – The first Arbor Day is celebrated in Nebraska.
- May 10 – Victoria Woodhull becomes the first woman nominated for President of the United States.
- May 22 – Reconstruction: President Ulysses S. Grant signs the Amnesty Act of 1872 into law restoring full civil rights to all but about 500 Confederate sympathizers.
- June 4 – Two men lead investors to land near the Wyoming-Colorado border claiming to have found diamonds there, starting a diamond craze in the western U.S. (which is later revealed as a fraud).
- August – Aaron Montgomery Ward issues the first Montgomery Ward mail order catalogue from Chicago.
- September 4 – The New York Sun breaks the story on the Crédit Mobilier of America scandal
- September 26 – The first Shriners Temple (called Mecca) is established in New York City.
- October 1 – The Virginia Agricultural and Mechanical College begins its first academic session (the university is later renamed Virginia Tech).
- November – Ulysses S. Grant defeats Horace Greeley in the 1872 United States presidential election
- November 2 – Spiritualist, suffragette, and Free Love advocate Victoria Woodhull publishes shocking allegations in Woodhull & Claflin's Weekly claiming in "The Beecher-Tilton Scandal Case" article that Henry Ward Beecher had committed adultery with Theodore Tilton's wife. The subsequent trials and hearings, "drove Reconstruction off the front pages for two and a half years" and became "the most sensational 'he said, she said' in American history", in the words of Walter A. McDougall.
- November 5
  - Women's suffrage: In defiance of the law, suffragist Susan B. Anthony votes for the first time (on November 18 she is served an arrest warrant and in the subsequent trial is fined $100 - which she never pays).
  - David P. Lewis is elected the 23rd governor of Alabama defeating Thomas H. Herndon.
- November 7 – The Mary Celeste sets sail from New York, bound for Genoa.
- November 9 – Great Boston Fire of 1872: In Boston, Massachusetts, a large fire begins to burn on Lincoln Street. The two-day event destroys about 65 acres (260,000 m^{2}) of city, 776 buildings, much of the financial district and causes US$60 million in damage.
- November 25 – David P. Lewis is sworn in as the 23rd Governor of Alabama replacing Robert B. Lindsay.
- November 28 – Geologist Clarence King uncovers the diamond hoax in Wyoming in The New York Times.
- November 29 – Indian Wars: The Modoc War begins with the Battle of Lost River.
- December 4 – The crewless American-owned ship Mary Celeste is found by the British brig Dei Gratia in the Atlantic.
- December 9 – P. B. S. Pinchback takes office as Governor of Louisiana, the first African American governor of a U.S. state.
- William Lawrence, a dairyman of Chester (village), New York, creates the first American cream cheese.
- First known publication of spiritual "The Gospel Train", by Fisk Jubilee Singers.

=== Ongoing ===
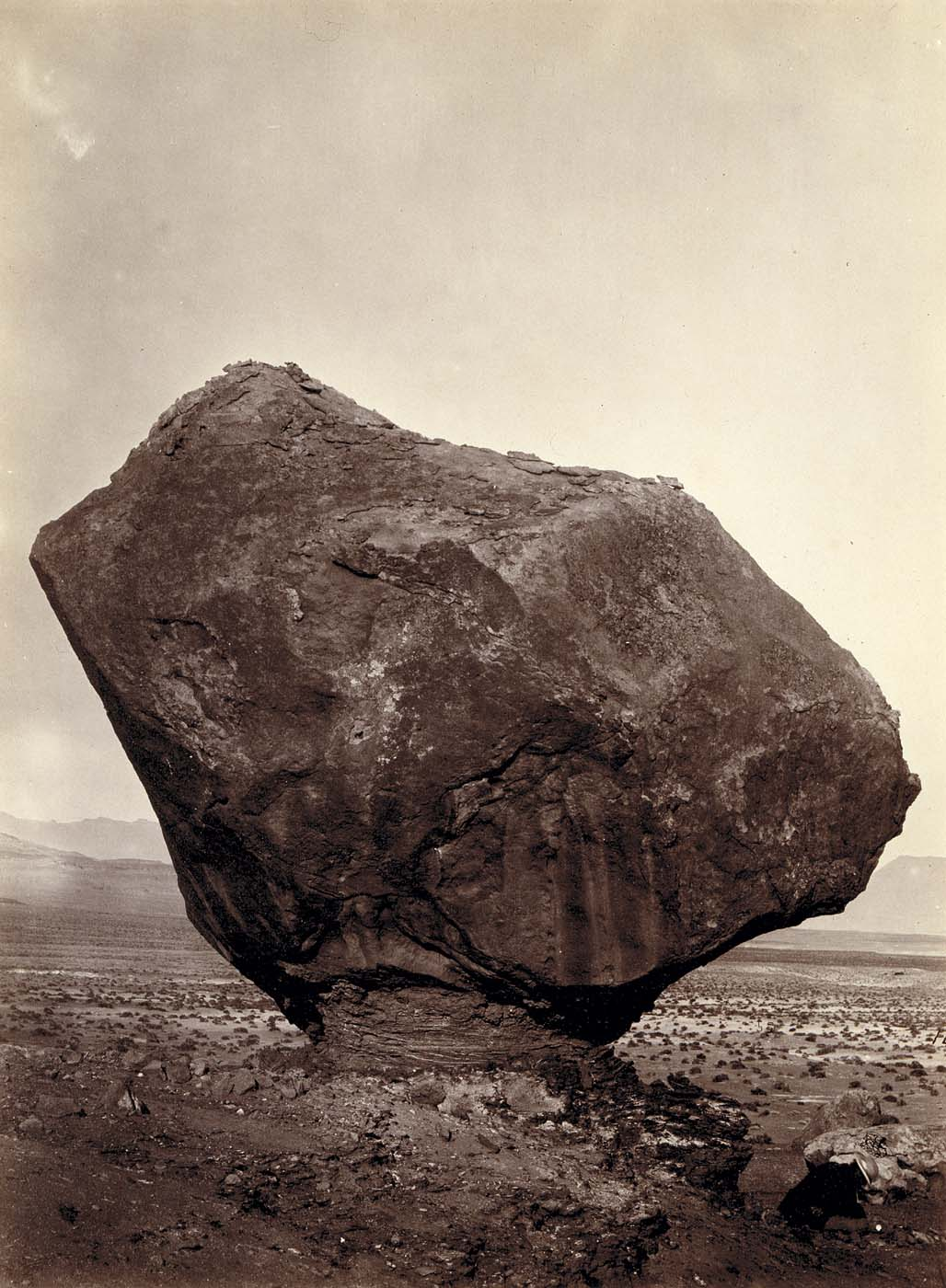
William Bell, Perched Rock, western Arizona Territory, 1872 photo for Wheeler Survey

- Reconstruction era (1865–1877)
- Gilded Age (1869–c. 1896)
- The Wheeler Survey of the southwestern U.S., 1872–1879

== Births ==
- January 4 – Albert Tyler, pole vaulter and educator (died 1945)
- January 20 – Julia Morgan, California architect (died 1957)
- January 31 – Zane Grey, Western novelist (died 1939)
- February 1 – Jerome F. Donovan, politician (died 1949)
- February 9 – Charles Klauder, university architect (died 1938)
- March 3 – Willie Keeler, baseball player (died 1923)
- March 6 – Ben Harney, ragtime pianist and songwriter (died 1938)
- March 14 – William Emerson Brock, U.S. Senator from Tennessee from 1929 to 1931 (died 1950)
- March 15 – Harry Holman, character film actor (died 1947)
- April 5 – Samuel Cate Prescott, food scientist and microbiologist (died 1962)
- April 23 – Nathan Philemon Bryan, U.S. Senator from Florida from 1911 to 1917 (died 1935)
- April 29 – Harry Payne Whitney, businessman and horse breeder (died 1930)
- May 16 – John O'Connell, baseball player (died 1908)
- May 21 – Henry E. Warren, inventor (died 1957)
- May 26 – Zachary Taylor Davis, Chicago architect (died 1946)
- May 31 – Charles Greeley Abbot, astrophysicist (died 1973)
- June 13 – Thomas N. Heffron, film director (died 1951)
- June 27 – Paul Laurence Dunbar, African American poet, novelist, playwright and publisher (died 1906)
- July 4 – Calvin Coolidge, 30th president of the United States from 1923 to 1929, 29th vice president of the United States from 1921 to 1923 (died 1933)
- July 8 – John H. Bankhead II, U.S. Senator from Alabama from 1931 to 1946 (died 1946)
- August 2 – George E. Stewart, U.S. Army officer, Medal of Honor recipient (died 1946)
- August 4 – Ruth Ward Kahn, lecturer and writer (unknown year of death)
- August 10 – William Manuel Johnson, African American dixieland jazz double-bassist (died 1972)
- August 15 – Rubin Goldmark, composer (died 1936)
- August 26:
  - Joseph Taylor Robinson, U.S. Senator from Arkansas from 1913 to 1937 (died 1937)
  - James J. Couzens, U.S. Senator from Michigan from 1922 to 1936 (died 1936)
- August 31 – Edith Rockefeller McCormick, socialite, daughter of Standard Oil co-founder John D. Rockefeller (d. 1932)
- September 8 – James William McCarthy, judge (died 1939)
- September 20 – Walter E. Scott, "Death Valley Scotty", confidence trickster (died 1954)
- September 28 – Charles F. Watkins, physician (died 1936)
- October 10 – Arthur Talmage Abernethy, journalist, scholar, theologian and poet, 1st North Carolina Poet Laureate from 1948 to 1953 (died 1956)
- October 11 – Harlan F. Stone, 12th Chief Justice of the United States from 1941 (died 1946)
- October 15 – Edith Wilson, wife of Woodrow Wilson, First Lady of the United States, (died 1961)
- November 2 – John N. Heiskell, U.S. Senator from Arkansas in 1913 (died 1972)
- November 7 – Leonora Speyer, née von Stosch, classical violinist and poet (died 1956)
- November 11 – Maude Adams, stage actress (died 1953)
- December 9 – Thomas W. Hardwick, U.S. Senator from Georgia from 1914 to 1919 (died 1944)
- December 17 – Walter Loving, African American military bandleader (killed 1945 in the Philippines)

== Deaths ==
- January 4 – Arnold Naudain, U.S. Senator from Delaware from 1830 to 1836 (born 1790)
- January 7 – James Fisk, financier (born 1835)
- January 9 – Henry Halleck, general (born 1815)
- January 21 – Thomas Bragg, U.S. Senator from North Carolina from 1859 to 1861, 2nd Confederate States Attorney General (born 1810)
- January 25 – Richard S. Ewell, Confederate general (born 1817)
- February 7 – James W. Grimes, U.S. Senator from Iowa from 1859 to 1869 (born 1816)
- March or April – Mercator Cooper, sea captain (born 1803)
- March 31 – Samuel Henry Dickson, poet, physician, writer and educator (born 1798)
- April 2 – Samuel Morse, inventor of the Morse code (born 1791)
- April 9 – Erastus Corning, businessman and politician (born 1794)
- April 10 – John Mix Stanley, painter (born 1814)
- May 17 – Eduard Sobolewski, violinist, composer and conductor (born 1804 or 1808 in Poland)
- August – Asa Whitney, merchant and promoter of the first transcontinental railroad (born 1791)
- August 11 – Lowell Mason, organist and composer (born 1792)
- September 18 – Augustus Seymour Porter, U.S. Senator from Michigan from 1840 to 1845 (born 1798)
- September 22 – Garrett Davis, U.S. Senator from Kentucky from 1861 to 1872 (born 1801)
- October 10 – William H. Seward, United States Secretary of State from 1861 to 1869 (born 1801)
- November 5 – Thomas Sully, portrait painter (born 1783 in Great Britain)
- November 6 – George Meade, Civil War general (born 1815)
- November 16 – William Gilham, military writer (born 1818)
- November 29 – Horace Greeley, newspaper editor and presidential candidate (born 1811)
- December 23 – George Catlin, painter specializing in portraits of Native Americans (born 1796)
- Henry Howard Brownell, poet and historian (born 1820)

== See also ==
- Timeline of United States history (1860–1899)
