= Old Greene County Courthouse =

- Greene County Courthouse
- U.S. National Register of Historic Places
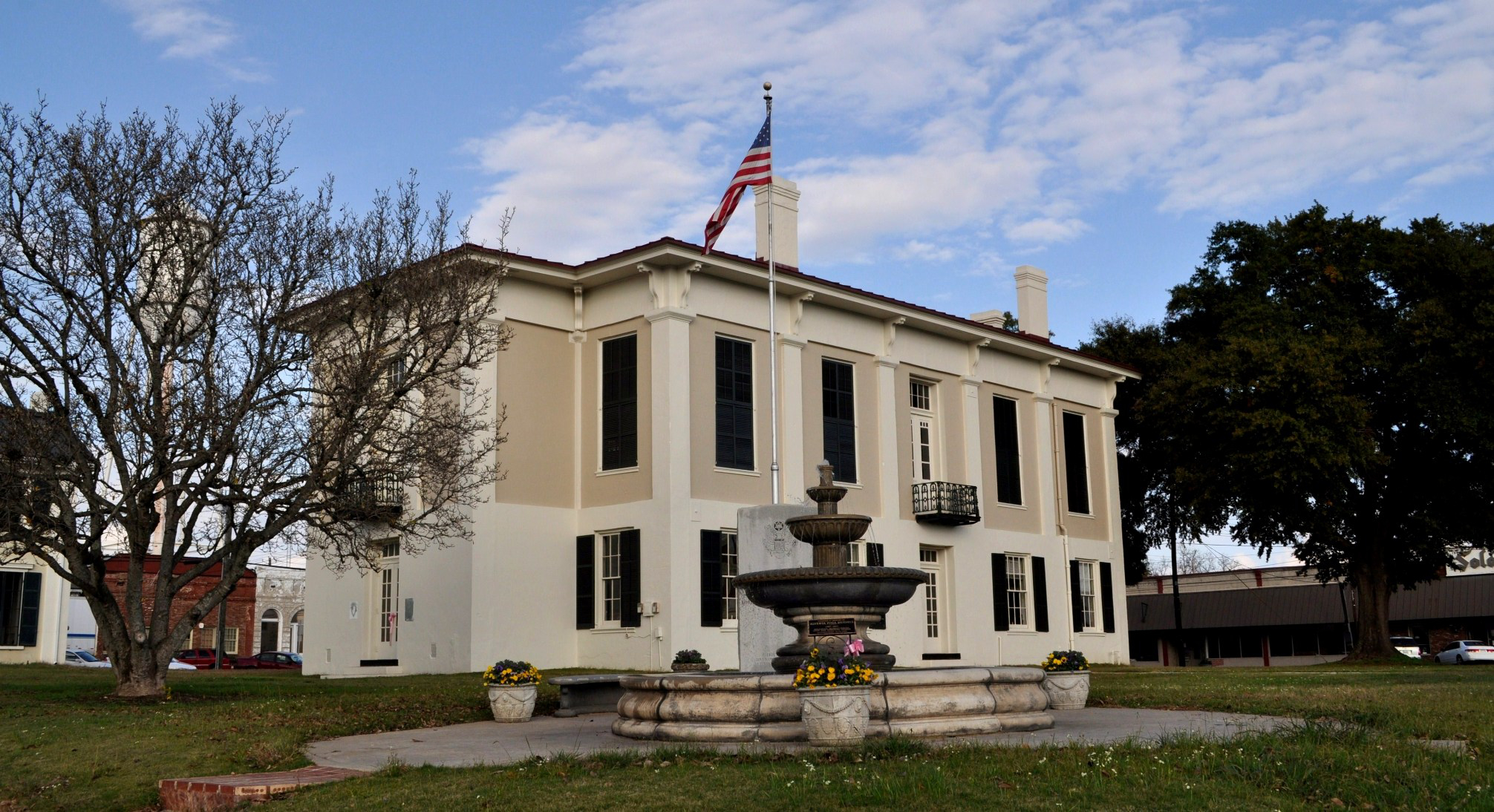

- Location within Alabama Location within the United States
- Location: Courthouse Square; Eutaw, Alabama
- Coordinates: 32°50′28″N 87°53′13″W
- Built: 1869
- Architectural style: Greek Revival, Italianate
- NRHP reference No.: 71000098
- Added to NRHP: March 24, 1971

The Old Greene County Courthouse is a historic courthouse in Eutaw, Alabama, United States. It housed the seat of government for Greene County from 1869 until 1993. The building is a two-story masonry structure in the Greek Revival style with Italianate influences. Architect Clay Lancaster proposed that it may be the last Greek Revival public building to be built in Alabama. It replaced an earlier wooden courthouse on the same site that was built in 1838. The prior courthouse was burned in 1868, in what is considered by most historians to have been a deliberate act of arson that was executed to destroy indictments brought by the recently installed Radical Reconstruction government against local citizens. The fire destroyed paperwork pertaining to some 1,800 suits by freedmen against planters which were about to be acted on. The courthouse was placed on the National Register of Historic Places on March 24, 1971, due to its architectural significance.

== See also ==
- Eutaw massacre
- National Register of Historic Places listings in Greene County, Alabama
