= Alexander Boyd (county solicitor) =

American lawyer

Alexander Boyd (September 8, 1834 – March 31, 1870) was notable as the Republican County Solicitor and Register in Chancery of Greene County, Alabama in 1870 during Reconstruction who was murdered by a lynching party of Ku Klux Klan members. He was fatally shot on March 31, 1870, in Eutaw, the county seat. The Klan members intended to hang him in the square in a public lynching, to demonstrate their power during this period and their threat to Republicans.

Boyd fiercely resisted their taking him from his hotel room. In the armed confrontation, he was shot and killed there. As was typical of most Klan attacks, his murderers were never brought to justice. That same night, prominent black Republican James Martin was shot and killed at his home in Union, Alabama, also in Greene County.

== Early life ==
Boyd was born in South Carolina, and later lived in Alabama. He was among thousands of Klan victims who were killed or wounded in Alabama and other Southern states during the Reconstruction era. The Klan's primary targets were freedmen and free blacks from the North, but they also attacked and intimidated white Republican officeholders, teachers, and other freedman sympathizers.

Similarly, the Greene County Courthouse was burned in 1868, and some suspect it was arson to destroy such records of suits by freedmen against planters.

== Death ==
On the night of Boyd's murder, thirty masked, armed, and costumed Klansmen were observed riding into the town square of Eutaw, the county seat of Greene County. A number of the men entered George Cleveland's hotel and demanded to be shown to Boyd's room. Boyd put up unexpected resistance and a gunfight broke out. He was wounded and left the room, and was fatally shot in the hallway. It is believed that he was attacked to prevent prosecution of suits by freedmen against planters. That same night, James Martin, a black Republican prominent in the county, was shot by gunmen near his home in Union, Alabama, who took him away rather than let him be treated; he was never seen again.

== Aftermath ==
Reports of the Thursday night murder brought several hundred armed freedmen into Eutaw on Saturday, April 2, 1870, calling for retaliation against the night riders. One member of the mob spoke for all when he said that local Confederates "have never surrendered yet, and the only way to stop this is to burn them out." A store in Eutaw, owned by a prominent white Democrat, was burned a few days after Boyd's murder, and several barns were also reportedly torched over the next month.

In the fall of 1870 before elections, two black politicians were killed in Greene County. An estimated four blacks were killed by whites in the Eutaw riot, which took place in the town square.

President Ulysses S. Grant gained congressional passage of the 1870 Enforcement Acts, intended to authorize the federal government to suppress Klan violence. While the Klan was suppressed, rifle leagues and such insurgent groups as the White League in Louisiana and Red Shirts in Mississippi and the Carolinas developed as other paramilitary insurgent groups.

== See also ==
- List of unsolved murders
