= 1874 Alabama gubernatorial election =

- November 3, 1874
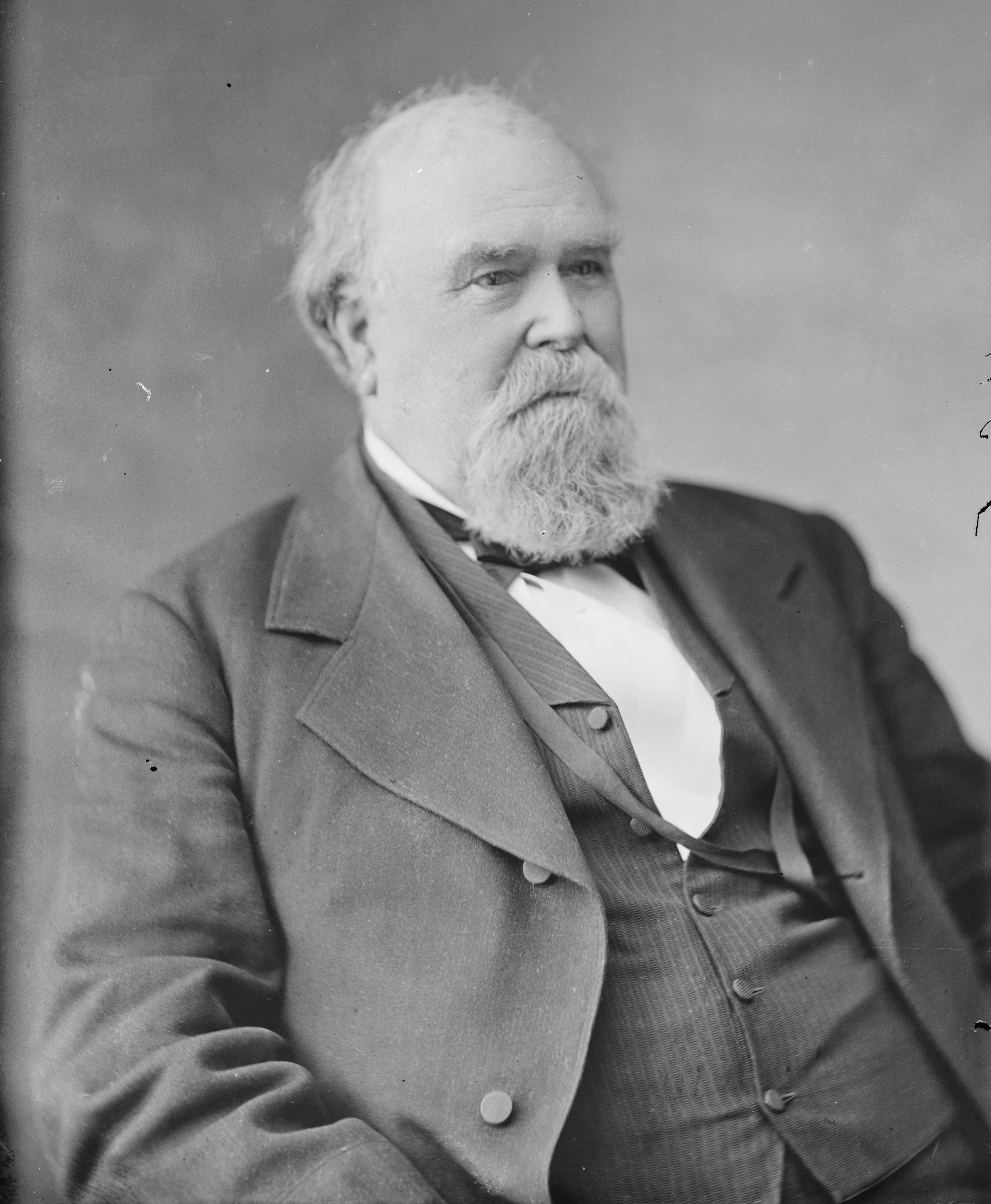

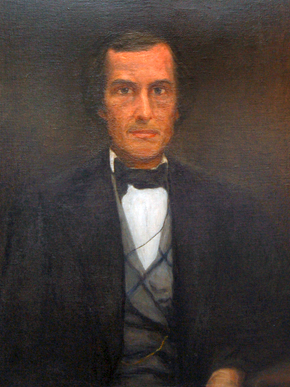
Nominee	George S. Houston	David P. Lewis
Party	Democratic	Republican
Popular vote	107,118	93,928
Percentage	53.28%	46.72%
- County results Houston: 50–60% 60–70% 70–80% 80–90% >90% Lewis: 50–60% 60–70% 70–80%
Governor before election
David P. Lewis
Republican
Elected Governor
George S. Houston
Democratic

The 1874 Alabama gubernatorial election took place on November 3, 1874, to elect the governor of Alabama. Incumbent Republican David P. Lewis unsuccessfully ran for reelection, losing to Democratic former U.S. Representative George S. Houston. This election would end an era of serious competition between the local Democratic and Republican parties, and start a 112-year win streak for Democrats in the gubernatorial level.

== General Election ==
Incumbent governor David P. Lewis was a former Democrat who represented Lawrence County at the state secession convention in the prelude to the American Civil War, voting against secession but eventually serving as a legislator in the Provisional Confederate Congress; he would go on to be a delegate at the 1868 Democratic National Convention for Alabama before joining the Republicans. Having been an advocate for the re-enfranchisement of scalawags who had served with the Confederacy and being a longtime resident of Alabama, Lewis was picked as the Republican nominee for the previous election. However, during his tenure, existing tensions between the factions of the Republicans, (Note: Most notably consisting of antebellum Unionists, or scalawags; northerners who had moved south post-war, or carpetbaggers; and the newly enfranchised population of former slaves, or freedmen.) particularly over civil rights and Reconstruction began to boil over, and the political violence of the Ku Klux Klan began to target many of the party's voters.

The Democratic nominee was George S. Houston, a former representative and Senator for the state who had been pro-Union at the time of secession, but remained in Alabama through the war, though he took no part in its fighting; he was chosen likewise in an effort to appeal to a broader coalition which included Unionists dissatisfied with Lewis' administration. The Democrats presented themselves as "redeemers" who would restore White dominance and eliminate Republican corruption.

Democrats used their comparative unity on the issues of civil rights and Reconstruction to their advantage; the dominance of these issues and the division of the Republicans on them, along with voter intimidation and fraud, handed Democrats the victory. After this, the Republicans remained out of the gubernatorial office until 1986, ending a period in which several elections had even been won by them and beginning a long period of Democratic dominance in the state.

=== Election day massacre ===
One notable incident of electoral violence took place on election day near Eufaula in Barbour County before moving to Spring Hill, where ballots were then being counted; a similar incident took place in Mobile County. In both cases, many of the Black voters fled, and the Democrats won the counties.

=== Results ===
1874 Alabama gubernatorial election
Party	Candidate	Votes	%
Democratic	George S. Houston	107,118	53.28
Republican	David P. Lewis (incumbent)	93,928	46.72
Total votes		201,046	100.00
Democratic gain from Republican			

The beginning of Democratic dominance in the state also led to the loss of the rights that had been gained by the Black population, and the beginning of segregation in the state. Soon after the election, the state would pass a new constitution which mandated the effective racial separation of schools, and established funding for each race's schools through the poll tax, which led in many areas to a lack of any Black schools. Also required was the segregation of prisons, and laws prohibiting interracial marriage and sex remained in place; however, Black suffrage remained mostly intact. By the 1880s, however, perceived threats to Democratic dominance from the ascendant Populists led to a repeat of the terror and fraud like those against Republicans in prior years, only this time the target was Black and poor White citizens; further laws were passed to enforce segregation and white dominance, including stricter vagrancy and work contract laws. In 1901, a new constitution had been created with the explicit aim of establishing, "within the limits imposed by the federal constitution", a system of white supremacy; this constitution effectively disenfranchised Blacks and many poor Whites by establishing, among other things, property requirements, literacy tests, and a cumulative poll tax.
