= Mount Hebron, Greene County, Alabama =

Unincorporated community in Alabama, US

Mount Hebron, Alabama
- Unincorporated community
- Location within Alabama Location within the United States
- Coordinates: 32°52′26″N 88°04′47″W
- Country: United States
- State: Alabama
- County: Greene
- Elevation: 266 ft (81 m)
- Time zone: UTC-6 (Central (CST))
  - Summer (DST): UTC-5 (CDT)
- Area codes: 205, 659
- GNIS feature ID: 156744

Mount Hebron, also known as Hebron, is an unincorporated community in Greene County, Alabama, United States. Mount Hebron is located on Alabama State Route 39, 11.4 miles (18.3 km) west-northwest of Eutaw.

== History ==
Mount Hebron was named for the mountain mentioned in the Bible. A post office operated under the name Hebron from 1826 to 1833 and under the name Mount Hebron from 1837 to 1965.
