= 1868 Alabama gubernatorial election =

- February 4, 1868
- Turnout: 6.44%
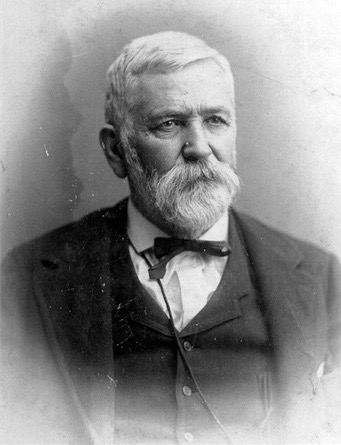
Nominee	William Hugh Smith
Party	Republican
Popular vote	62,067
Percentage	100.00%
- County results Smith: 100% Unknown/No Vote
Governor before election
Robert M. Patton
Independent
Elected Governor
William Hugh Smith
Republican

The 1868 Alabama gubernatorial election took place on February 4, 1868, in order to elect the governor of Alabama. Republican William Hugh Smith ran unopposed. This is the first time that a Republican became governor of Alabama.

== Results ==
1868 Alabama gubernatorial election
Party	Candidate	Votes	%
Republican	William Hugh Smith	62,067	100.00
Total votes		62,067	100.00
Republican gain from Independent			
