= George S. Houston =

American politician (1811–1879)

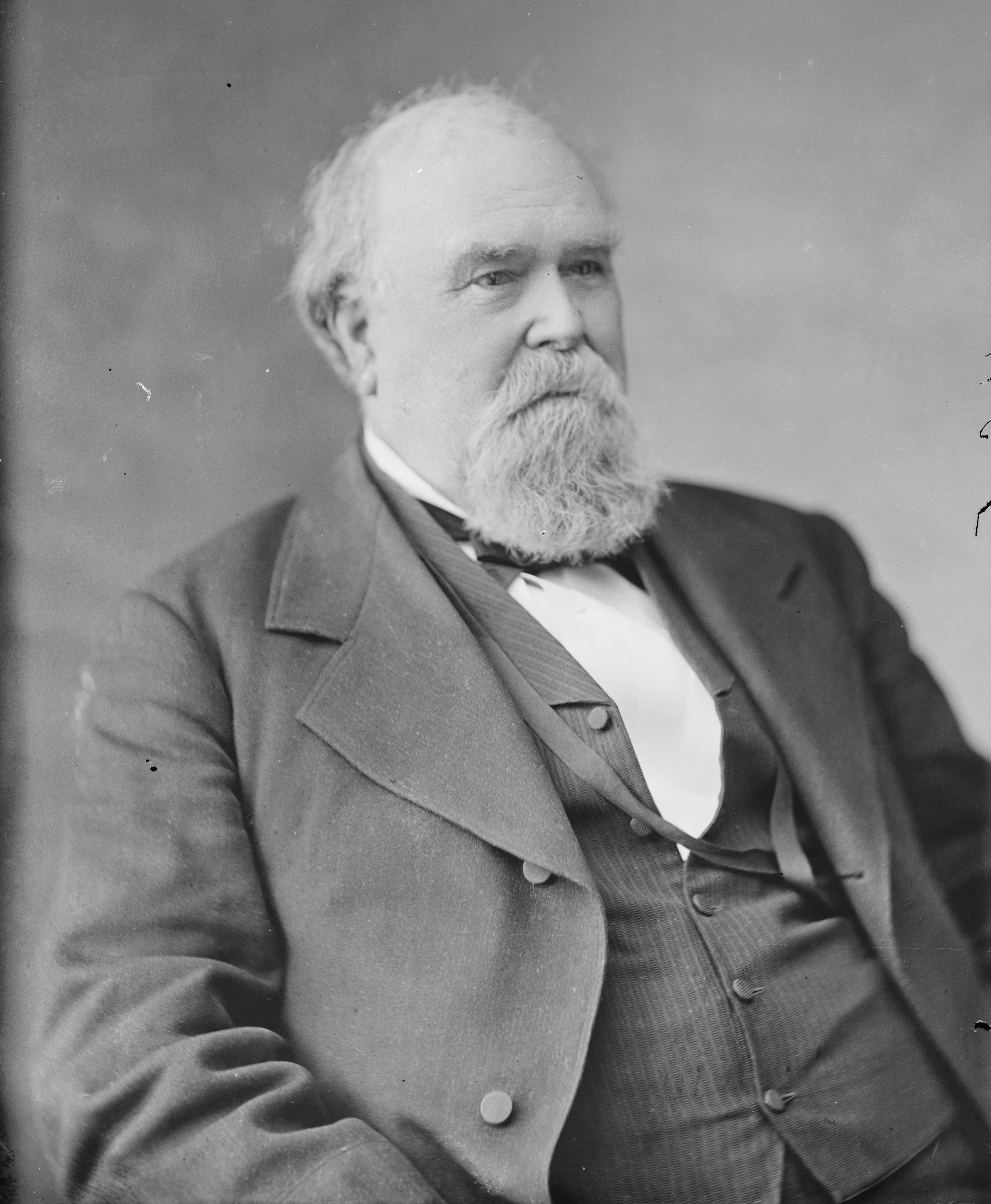
- Houston, 1865–1879

United States Senator from Alabama
- In office March 4, 1879 – December 31, 1879
- Preceded by: George E. Spencer
- Succeeded by: Luke Pryor

24th Governor of Alabama
- In office November 24, 1874 – November 28, 1878
- Lieutenant: Robert F. Ligon; Vacant
- Preceded by: David P. Lewis
- Succeeded by: Rufus W. Cobb

Chairman of the House Democratic Caucus
- In office March 4, 1859 – January 21, 1861
- Speaker: Samuel J. Randall
- Preceded by: George W. Jones (1857)
- Succeeded by: William E. Niblack/ Samuel J. Randall (1869)

Member of the U.S. House of Representatives from Alabama's 5th district
- In office March 4, 1843 – March 3, 1849
- Preceded by: James Dellet
- Succeeded by: David Hubbard
- In office March 4, 1851 – January 21, 1861
- Preceded by: David Hubbard
- Succeeded by: John Benton Callis

Member of the U.S. House of Representatives from Alabama's at-large district
- In office March 4, 1841 – March 3, 1843
- Preceded by: District inactive
- Succeeded by: District inactive

Personal details
- Born: George Smith Houston; January 17, 1811 Franklin, Tennessee, U.S.
- Died: December 31, 1879 (aged 68) Athens, Alabama, U.S.
- Resting place: Athens City Cemetery, Athens, Alabama
- Party: Democratic
- Parent(s): David Ross Houston; Hannah Pugh Reagan

George Smith Houston (January 17, 1811 – December 31, 1879) was an American Democratic politician who was the 24th governor of Alabama from 1874 to 1878. He was also a representative and senator for Alabama.

== Early life ==
Houston was born near Franklin, Tennessee, on January 17, 1811, to David Ross Houston and Hannah Pugh Reagan. The paternal grandson of Scots-Irish immigrants, Houston and his family moved near Florence, Alabama, at age 16. There, Houston worked on the family farm and read law at Judge George Coalter's office. He eventually studied law at a school in Harrodsburg, Kentucky.

== Early career ==
After graduating law school, Houston returned to Florence and was elected to the Alabama House of Representatives in 1831 as a Jacksonian Democrat, representing Lauderdale County. In 1834, Governor John Gayle appointed Houston to be district solicitor, but he was defeated in the subsequent election to that office. He then moved to Limestone County and continued to practice law. In 1837, Houston was elected in his own right to be a solicitor and held that office until 1841.

== U.S. House of Representatives ==
In 1840, Houston was elected as a Democrat to the United States House of Representatives. During his tenure, he chaired the House Military Affairs Committee, the House Ways and Means Committee, and the House Judiciary Committee.

As a Southern Unionist, Houston was one of only four southern Democrats not to sign Senator John C. Calhoun's "Address of the Southern Delegates in Congress to their Constituents" in 1849, which questioned the federal government's right to limit slavery in territories won in the Mexican–American War. Opposition to the congressman grew, and he didn't seek re-election in 1848.

Houston ran for Congress again in 1850 and won. In December 1860, Houston was chosen to represent Alabama in the so-called "Committee of Thirty-Three". The Committee adopted the Corwin Amendment, which would have amended the United States Constitution so that Congress could never abolish slavery.

== Civil War and Reconstruction ==
Following the American Civil War outbreak, Houston resigned from his office and returned home. Two of his sons fought for the Confederate States of America, but Houston himself stayed out of the war. In 1862, Houston's property was ransacked by U.S. Army General Ivan Turchin.

Houston presented his credentials as a senator-elect from Alabama during Reconstruction, but the Republican Party refused to seat him. Houston attended President Andrew Johnson's 1866 National Union Convention to oppose the Radical Republicans. Houston attempted to become a U.S. Senator again in 1867 but was defeated by former Governor John A. Winston. Like in the Civil War, Houston would play no part in Reconstruction in Alabama.

== Governor of Alabama ==
In 1874, Houston ran a successful campaign for governor, garnering 53% of the vote and ousting incumbent David P. Lewis. Houston's election was the start of a long line of Democratic governors of the state, not being broken until 1986. Houston ran on a platform of "redeeming" the state and promising honesty and economy instead of Republican profligacy. The Democrats also intimidated many Republican voters, especially blacks. Houston served as a Bourbon Democrat, advocating conservatism, limited government, and white supremacy. As governor, the state legislature approved the creation of one of the nation's first public health boards. Though it was created in 1875, no monies were appropriated until 1879. With a shrinking population, Governor Houston advocated for immigration into Alabama, with limited success. In a widely condemned move, Houston expanded the state's contract lease system, in which mostly black prisoners would be leased to private contractors.

Governor Houston also attempted to reform the state's educational system. However, his efforts were unsuccessful due to his administration's inherited debt from railroad bonds. Houston created a three-person commission, headed by himself, to study the debt issue and to recommend a program to retire it. Tirstam B. Bethea of Mobile and Levi W. Lawler of Talladega served as the other two commissioners. Lawler and Houston had a history of working as railroad directors, creating a conflict of interest. The commission eventually set the legitimate debt at $12.5 million. The Republican-controlled Alabama and Chattanooga Railroad bondholders were the most adversely affected.

Houston advocated a constitutional convention to replace the constitution adopted in 1868. Voters approved the new constitution in 1875. The constitution declared that the state could never again secede from the United States and banned educational and property qualifications for voting or holding office. Also, the constitution eliminated the position of lieutenant governor.

== Personal life ==
In May 1835, Houston married Mary I. Beatty and had eight children, four of whom died in childhood. His wife died before 1860, and Houston remarried in 1861 to Ellen Irvine, who bore him two additional children. By 1860, Houston was a successful cotton planter, enslaving 78 people.

== Death ==
Houston was finally elected to the United States Senate in 1878 but died at his home in Athens on December 31, 1879. He was buried in Athens City Cemetery.

== See also ==
- List of members of the United States Congress who died in office (1790–1899)

Party political offices
Vacant Title last held by Robert B. Lindsay	Democratic nominee for Governor of Alabama; 1874, 1876	Succeeded by Rufus W. Cobb
U.S. House of Representatives
Preceded by District inactive	Member of the U.S. House of Representatives from Alabama's at-large congressional district March 4, 1841 – March 3, 1843	Succeeded by District inactive
Preceded by James Dellet	Member of the U.S. House of Representatives from Alabama's 5th congressional district March 4, 1843 – March 3, 1849	Succeeded by David Hubbard
Preceded by David Hubbard	Member of the U.S. House of Representatives from Alabama's 5th congressional district March 4, 1851 – March 3, 1861	Succeeded by John Benton Callis
Political offices
Preceded by David P. Lewis	Governor of Alabama; 1874–1878	Succeeded by Rufus W. Cobb
U.S. Senate
Preceded by George E. Spencer	U.S. senator (Class 3) from Alabama; March 4, 1879 – December 31, 1879; Served alongside: John T. Morgan	Succeeded by Luke Pryor
