= David Hubbard (politician) =

American politician (1792–1874)

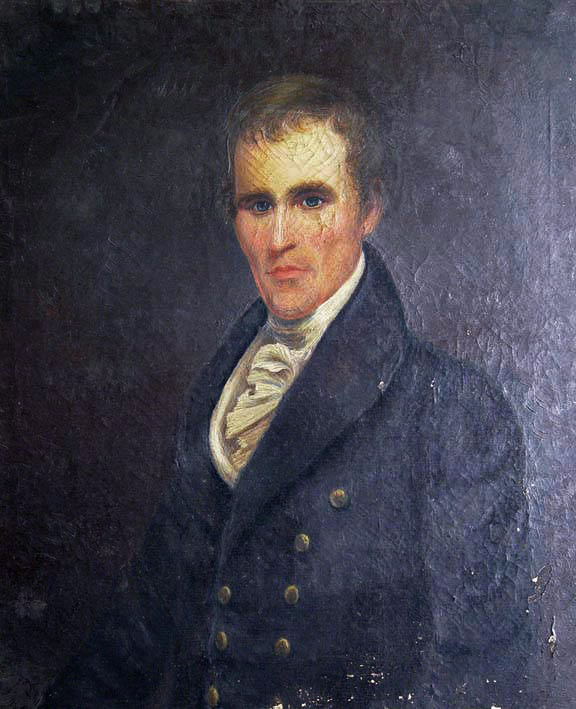

Member of the U.S. House of Representatives from Alabama's 2nd district
- In office March 4, 1839 – March 3, 1841
- Preceded by: Joshua L. Martin
- Succeeded by: District inactive

Member of the U.S. House of Representatives from Alabama's 5th district
- In office March 4, 1849 – March 3, 1851
- Preceded by: George S. Houston
- Succeeded by: George S. Houston

Member of the Alabama House of Representatives
- In office 1831; 1842; 1843; 1845; 1853

Member of the Alabama Senate
- In office 1827-1828

Personal details
- Born: David Hubbard; 1792 Bedford County, Virginia, U.S.
- Died: January 20, 1874 (aged 81 or 82) Pointe Coupee Parish, Louisiana, U.S.
- Resting place: Episcopal Church of the Nativity churchyard, Rosedale, Iberville Parish, Louisiana
- Party: Democratic

David Hubbard (1792 – January 20, 1874) was a U.S. representative from Alabama born near the town of Old Liberty (now Bedford), Bedford County, Virginia, and a cousin of Sam Houston. He has been described as the "most influential and prominent secessionist in north Alabama."

== Biography ==
Hubbard attended the county schools and an academy. During the War of 1812 he entered the Army and served as a major in the Quartermaster Corps. He moved to Huntsville, Alabama, where he worked as a carpenter. He studied law and was admitted to the bar about 1820, and commenced practice in Huntsville, moving to Florence and serving as a solicitor from 1823 to 1826. In 1827 he moved to Moulton and became a merchant, also serving as a member of the State senate in 1827 and 1828, and being a member of the board of trustees of the University of Alabama from 1828 to 1835. He moved to Courtland in 1829, where he engaged in buying and selling Chickasaw Indian land. He was elected a member of the State house of representatives in 1831, 1842, 1843, 1845, and 1853.

Hubbard was elected as a Democrat to the Twenty-sixth U.S. Congress (March 4, 1839 – March 3, 1841), and stood unsuccessfully for re-election in 1840 to the Twenty-seventh Congress, then resuming the practice of law.

Hubbard was elected to the Thirty-first U.S. Congress (March 4, 1849 – March 3, 1851), and stood unsuccessfully for re-election in 1850 to the Thirty-second Congress. He served as a delegate to the Southern Commercial Congress at Savannah, Georgia, in 1859. He served as a presidential elector on the Breckinridge and Lane ticket in 1860. He served as a member of the Confederate States House of Representatives 1861–1863 and as the first Confederate States Commissioner of Indian Affairs 1863–1865. He moved to Spring Hill, Tennessee. He died at the home of his son in Pointe Coupee Parish, Louisiana, January 20, 1874. He was interred in Episcopal Church of the Nativity churchyard, Rosedale, Iberville Parish, Louisiana.

U.S. House of Representatives
Preceded by Joshua L. Martin	Member of the U.S. House of Representatives from Alabama's 2nd congressional district March 4, 1839 – March 3, 1841	Succeeded by District inactive
Preceded by George S. Houston	Member of the U.S. House of Representatives from Alabama's 5th congressional district March 4, 1849 – March 3, 1851	Succeeded by George S. Houston
