= 1870 Alabama gubernatorial election =

- November 8, 1870
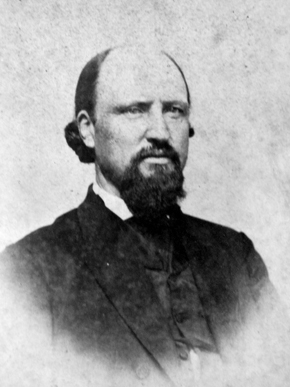

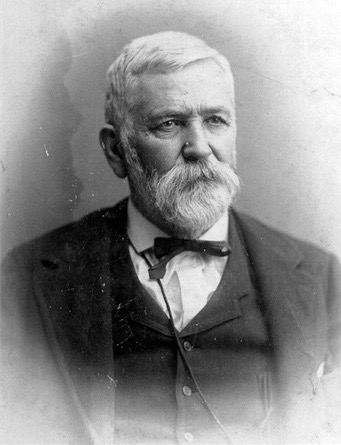
Nominee	Robert B. Lindsay	William Hugh Smith
Party	Democratic	Republican
Popular vote	77,723	76,282
Percentage	50.47%	49.53%
- County results Lindsay: 50–60% 60–70% 70–80% 80–90% >90% Smith: 50–60% 60–70% 70–80%
Governor before election
William Hugh Smith
Republican
Elected Governor
Robert B. Lindsay
Democratic

The 1870 Alabama gubernatorial election took place on November 8, 1870, in order to elect the governor of Alabama. Incumbent Republican William Hugh Smith was narrowly defeated by Democrat Robert B. Lindsay.

The run-up to the election was marred by political and racist terrorism by the Ku Klux Klan, in support of Lindsay. This violence included the lynching of four blacks and a white in Calhoun County, the murder of two blacks (one a Republican politician) in Greene County, and the October Eutaw massacre. In Greene County, for instance, the violence in Eutaw is credited with swaying the vote in that county toward Lindsay: in the 1868 presidential election, Greene County had voted for Ulysses S. Grant by a margin of 2,000 votes; in the 1870 gubernatorial election it voted for Robert B. Lindsay by a margin of 43.

== Results ==
1870 Alabama gubernatorial election
Party	Candidate	Votes	%
Democratic	Robert B. Lindsay	77,723	50.47
Republican	William Hugh Smith (incumbent)	76,282	49.53
Total votes		154,005	100.00
Democratic gain from Republican			
