= Eutaw massacre =

KKK attack on black civilians and Republicans

Coordinates: 32°50′25″N 87°53′16″W

Eutaw riot
- Part of Reconstruction Era
- Location: Eutaw, Alabama, U.S.
- Date: October 25, 1870
- Target: Black civilians and Republicans
- Attack type: Riot
- Deaths: 2-4
- Injuries: 54
- Perpetrators: Ku Klux Klan and supporters
- Motive: Voter intimidation

The Eutaw riot was an episode of white racial violence in Eutaw, Alabama, the county seat of Greene County, on October 25, 1870, during the Reconstruction Era in the United States. It was related to an extended period of campaign violence before the fall gubernatorial election, as white Democrats in the state used racial terrorism to suppress black Republican voting. White Klan members attacked a Republican rally of 2,000 black citizens in the courthouse square, killing as many as four and wounding 54.

Black Republicans feared for their safety, staying away from the polls or voting Democratic. The Democratic Party won the 1870 gubernatorial election, as similar intimidation was conducted against blacks in other heavily majority Republican counties.

== Background and violence ==
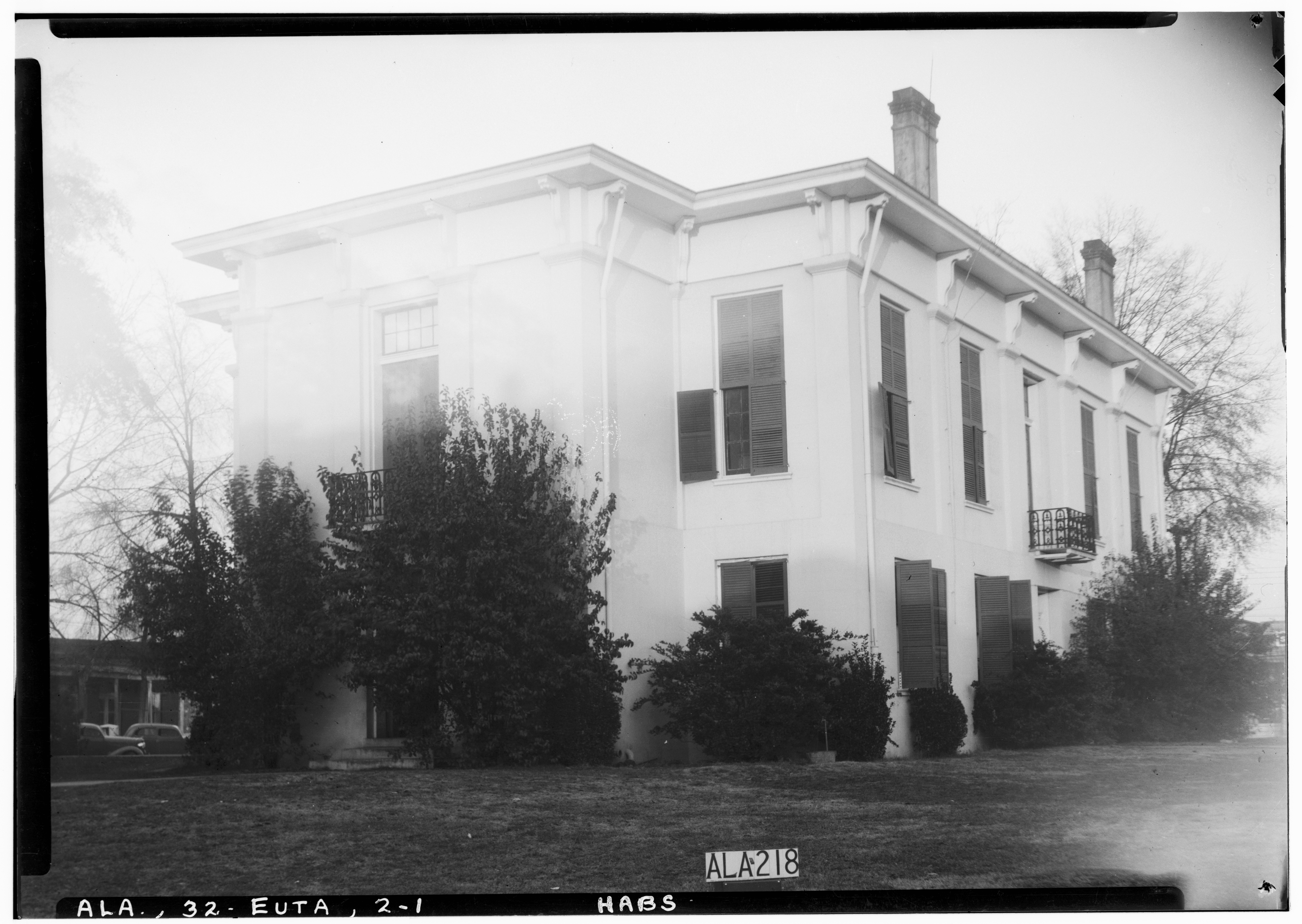
Old Greene County Courthouse in Eutaw, Alabama

As in other states of the former Confederacy, Alabama citizens had been terrorized frequently by the Ku Klux Klan in the run-up to the 1870 gubernatorial election: in Calhoun County, four blacks and one white had been lynched in July 1870. In Greene County, Gilford Coleman, a black Republican leader, had been lynched, fatally shot and his body mutilated, after being taken from his own house. His was the first of two political assassinations of black men in the county in the summer and fall.

Earlier in the year, on the night of March 31, 1870, James Martin, a black Republican from Union, Alabama was killed, as was white Republican County Solicitor Alexander Boyd, shot in his hotel in Eutaw, the county seat, by members of a 30-member, masked and costumed lynching party who rode into town on horseback. No one was prosecuted for either death, and state attempts to end violence in Greene County stopped after Boyd's murder.

On October 25, a Republican political rally was held at the county courthouse in Eutaw, attracting 2,000 blacks. The rally was attacked by Klansmen (supporting Democrats), who first verbally harassed the attendees and then started shooting; they left two to four blacks dead and 54 people injured.

Federal troops in the area did not intervene that day. Black voters stayed away from the polls on election day in fear of more violence, contributing to Democratic electoral success for the governorship. In the 1868 presidential election, Greene County had voted for Republican Ulysses S. Grant by a margin of 2,000 votes; in the 1870 gubernatorial election, voters carried Democrat Robert B. Lindsay by a margin of 43 votes.

== Legal aftermath ==
After the riot, local man Samuel B. Brown, likely a low-ranking Republican politician, appeared before U.S. Circuit Court Judge William Woods. His testimony resulted in a complaint charging fourteen whites with violating the First Amendment, and white Democrats with violating the Constitutional rights of Brown and six others by the Eutaw attack.

Election day was calm in Eutaw. Black voters, intimidated and fearful, stayed home or voted Democratic. While state officials took no action (besides arresting some of the black victims of the riot), the U.S. Commissioner in Demopolis issued arrest warrants, and $4000 bonds to ensure the defendants appeared in court.

A federal grand jury indicted twenty of the rioters on December 24, 1870, while Woods was awaiting a response to a letter he sent to U.S. Supreme Court Justice Joseph P. Bradley, inquiring whether federal law, particularly the Enforcement Act of 1870, was applicable to these events. Bradley responded in January 1871, indicating he understood the real question: whether the rioters had violated the victims' constitutionally protected right to freedom of speech. The Fourteenth and Fifteenth Amendments protected individuals against the state, but in Eutaw, private individuals, not the state, had violated citizens' rights.

The matter was considered especially pressing as some Southern states had been readmitted to the Union. But despite passage of the Enforcement Acts in May 1870 to end Klan violence, Democratic politicians and their supporters in those states continued with violent suppression of the black (Republican) vote, resulting in significant Republican losses in the U.S. Congress. These events strengthened Bradley in his resolve to defeat violent white Southerners by legal means.

United States Attorney General Amos T. Akerman, a former Confederate and slaveholder who became one of the Klan's most outspoken enemies, directed prosecution of the case. In the end, federal prosecutors failed to gain a conviction in United States v. Hall, which was against one of the white defendants, as the jury failed to convict. Judge Wood's opinion, however, in overruling the demurrer, was notable for the latitude it gave to future federal prosecutors to draw indictments of private violations of fundamental rights under the Enforcement Acts. Bradley, later, backed away from application of the 14th Amendment to protecting natural rights of individuals. If US v. Hall had been decided in favor of the government, it has been argued, the case could have set an important precedent for the protection of African Americans under the Fourteenth Amendment.
