= Jena, Alabama =

Unincorporated community in Alabama, US

- Unincorporated community
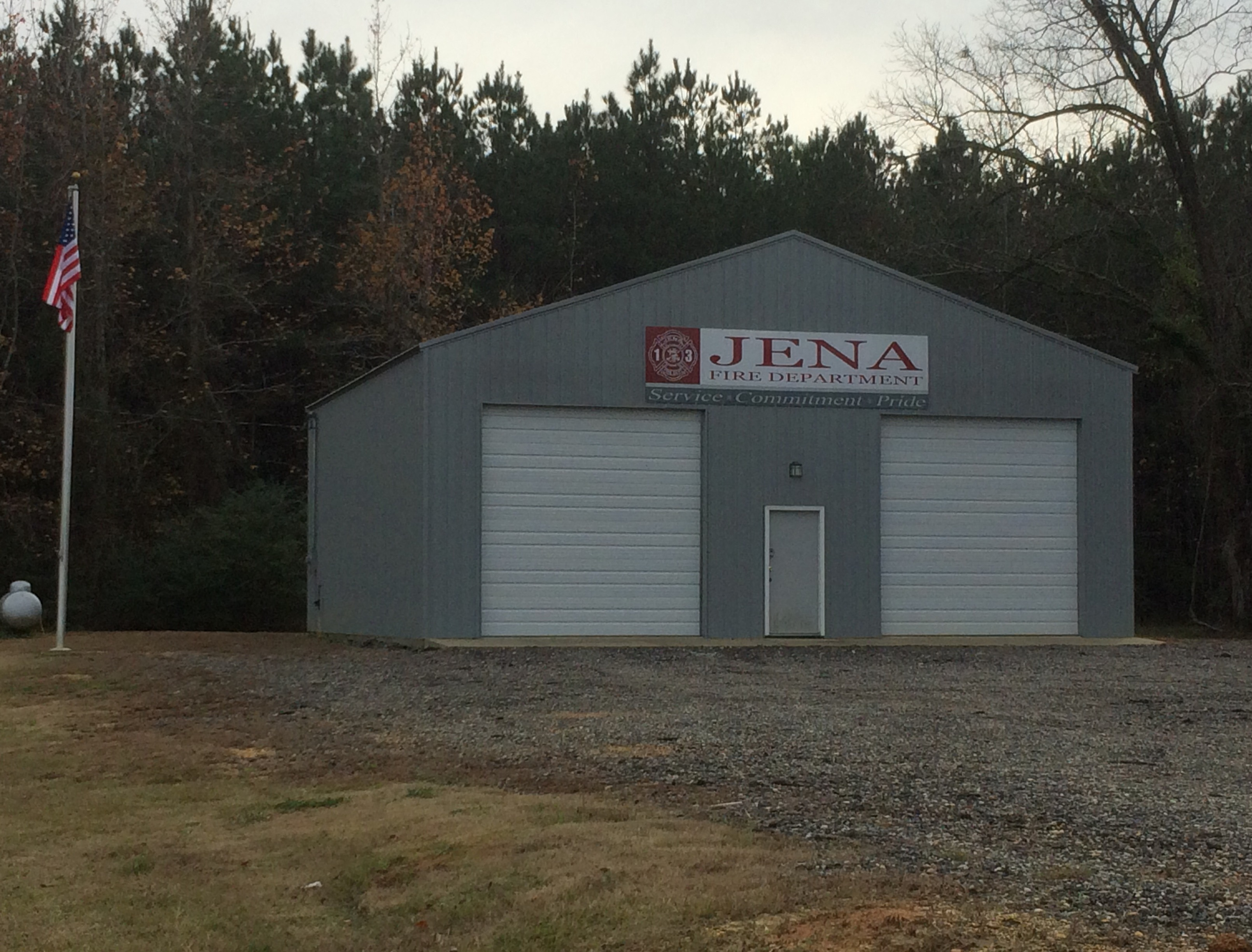
- Jena fire department

- Location within Alabama Location within the United States
- Coordinates: 33°07′50″N 87°50′49″W
- Country: United States
- State: Alabama
- County: Greene
- Elevation: 200 ft (61 m)
- Time zone: UTC-6 (Central (CST))
  - Summer (DST): UTC-5 (CDT)
- Area codes: 205, 659
- GNIS feature ID: 120838

Jena /ˈdʒi.nə/ is an unincorporated community in Greene County, Alabama, United States.

== History ==
Jena was most likely named by a German family who settled in the area in honor of Jena, Germany. A post office operated under the name Jena from 1837 to 1921. Baseball Country, a world-renowned baseball camp, is located in Jena.
