= Nicholas Davis Jr. =

American politician (1825–1875)

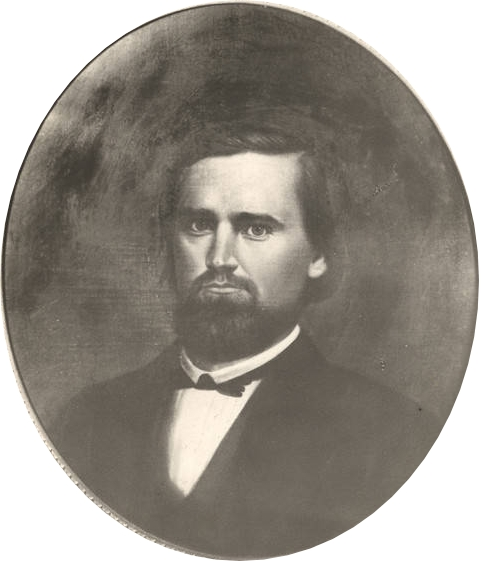

Deputy from Alabama to the Provisional Congress of the Confederate States
- In office April 29, 1861 – February 17, 1862
- Preceded by: David P. Lewis
- Succeeded by: Constituency abolished

Personal details
- Born: January 14, 1825 Athens, Alabama, US
- Died: November 3, 1875 (aged 50) Huntsville, Alabama, US
- Resting place: Maple Hill Cemetery, Huntsville, Alabama

Nicholas Davis Jr. (January 14, 1825 – November 3, 1875) was an American politician who served as a Deputy from Alabama to the Provisional Congress of the Confederate States from April 1861 to February 1862.

== Biography ==
Nicholas Davis Jr. was born in Limestone County, Alabama, and served in the legislature in 1851. He was elected to the Provisional Congress of the Confederate States to replace David P. Lewis and served in that capacity from April 1861 to February 1862.

He was unsuccessful in organizing his regiment during the American Civil War and served as lieutenant colonel of the 19th Regiment Alabama Infantry instead.

Davis was a proponent and supporter of slavery in Alabama. In 1827, he was one of several signatories of "1827-01-08 Alabama Resolution Denouncing Emancipation of Slaves" that contended that slavery was a state's right's issue, and that the federal government did not have the authority to abolish the practice. An excerpt from the letter states:

″The select Committee [signatories]...on the subject of the abolition and general emancipation of persons of colour heled in solitude in the United States; having had the same under consideration, respectfully submit the following Report: They conceive that the subject is one in which the States (where the evil complained of exists) are alone interested; that the frequent interference of the non-slave holding states in a matter so purely internal and domestic, is alike impolitic and incompatible with the rights and interest of the slave-holding states; and that the dictates of policy forbid the too frequent agitation of a question, which by the Constitution of the United States and of the several slave-holding states, is beyond the exercise of legislative control.″

The letter further states that the signatories disapprove with the ″entire emancipation of slaves″. he died in Huntsville Alabama in 1875

A historical marker in Limestone County commemorates Davis' life and political engagement, but makes no mention of his support of slavery.

Political offices
Preceded by David P. Lewis	Delegate from Alabama to the Provisional Congress of the Confederate States; 1861–1862	Succeeded by Constituency abolished
