= Ruth Ward Kahn =

American poet

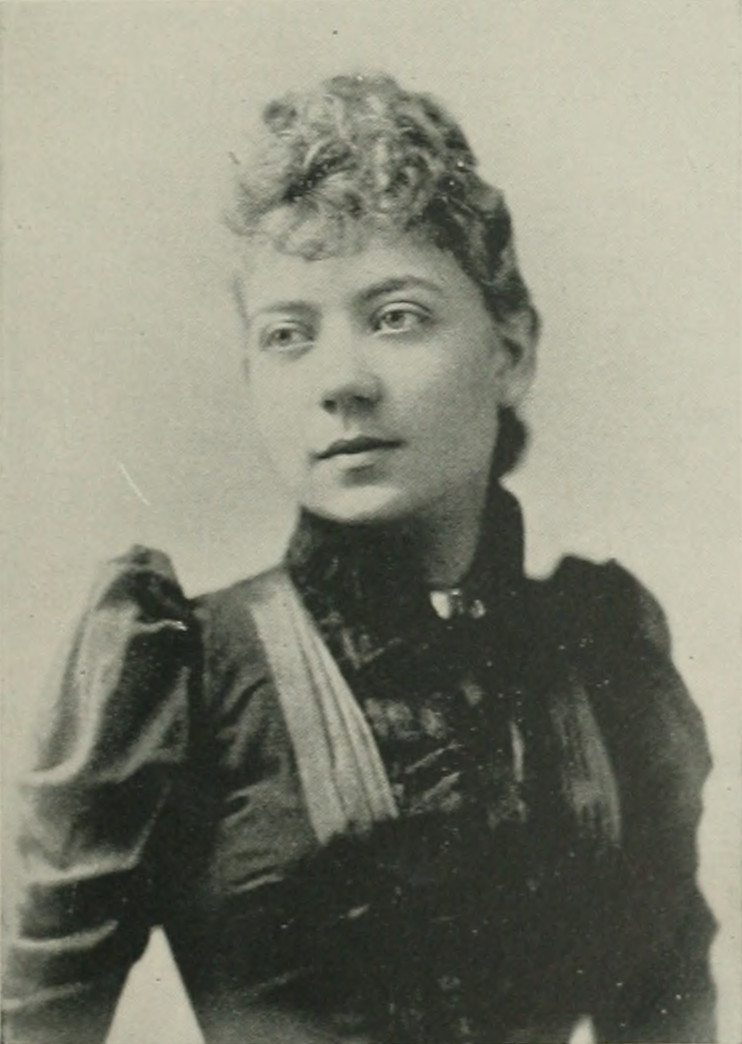
- Photo in A Woman of the Century
- Born: Ruth Ward; August 4, 1870/72; Jackson, Michigan, U.S.
- Education: University of Michigan
- Occupations: poet; author
- Spouse: Lee Kahn (m. 1891; died 1899)
- Children: Milo Ward Kahn
- Writing career
- Language: English
- Genres: poetry; prose
- Notable work: The First Quarter

Ruth Ward Kahn (née, Ward; August 4, 1870/72 – ?) was a Jewish American lecturer and writer. In addition to being the author of novel, The Story of Judith (novel), The First Quarter (collected poems; 1898), and "Gertrude" (epic poem), she was a contributor to Woman's Home Companion, Arena, Popular Science, and other publications. She was a member of the Incorporated Society of Authors of London, as well as the Woman's National Press Association, of which she served as the vice-president for its Colorado branch. Kahn's travels took her to Bermuda, Mexico, Hawaii, and the South Sea Islands; she lectured in 20 states.

== Early life and education ==
Ruth Ward was born in Jackson, Michigan, August 4, 1870, or August 4, 1872. Her father, Judge Ward, had been a leading lawyer in that city, serving as district attorney and as judge of the probate court of Michigan. Early on, Ward became a contributor to local newspapers and school magazines. She was educated at the University of Michigan, Ann Arbor, where she was graduated with honors and the degree of B.A., in 1889.

== Career ==
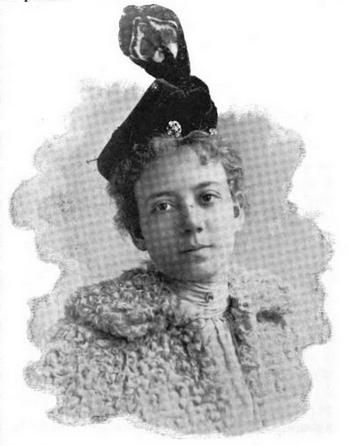
Ruth Ward Kahn (1896)

In January 1891, she married Lee Kahn, M.D. (1867–1899) in Denver's Temple Emanuel. On their return from the South Sea Islands, she published in the Popular Science News a noted paper on "Hawaiian Ant Life." She contributed to the Denver Commonwealth, and Rocky Mountain News, to the American Israelite, of Cincinnati, New Orleans Picayune, Elmira Telegram, and the St. Louis Jewish Voice. She brought out an epic poem, "Gertrude", and a novel, The Story of Judith.

Her lectures in many cities and states were praised. At the Woman's Congress, held in connection with the Cotton States and International Exposition, her address on "A Stranger in a Strange Land" was spoken of as "a notably eloquent effort, and one of the best heard in Assembly Hall". Kahn made a very thorough study of Hawaii and Bermuda, and lectured on the customs, the manners, and the scenery of these islands. Aside from her literary work and her lectures and readings, she devoted effort to the welfare and happiness of needy women and children.

Kahn was one of the youngest members of the Incorporated Society of Authors, of London, England, which society she joined in 1890. She was an honorary member of the Authors' and Artists' Club, Kansas City, Missouri, and of the Woman's National Press Association.

== Personal life ==
Kahn made her home in Leadville, where she was also a talented artist. She had one child, a son, Milo Ward Kahn, who died in childhood. Lee Kahn died shortly thereafter, on February 26, 1899. In May of that year, in York, Indiana, she visited her mother, D. S. Griggs, and two sisters, Sylvia Wicoff and Stella Shirtz, before they sailed for Europe the following month. Returning to the U.S., she traveled again in June 1900, in company with several teachers, from Chicago for Manilla. She was again back in the U.S. by March 1900, in need to surgery in Newark, New Jersey.

In 1907, Kahn's family was making inquires throughout the U.S. in the hopes of ascertaining whether Kahn was alive or dead. Her mother and a niece were tracing every possible clue that might be useful.

== Selected works ==
=== Novels ===
- The Story of Judith

=== Poetry ===
- The First Quarter (collected poems; 1898)
- "Gertrude" (epic poem)
