= David P. Lewis =

American politician

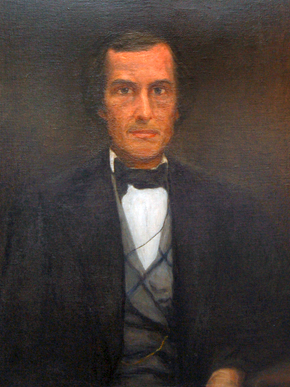

23rd Governor of Alabama
- In office November 17, 1872 – November 24, 1874
- Lieutenant: Alexander McKinstry
- Preceded by: Robert B. Lindsay
- Succeeded by: George S. Houston

Deputy from Alabama to the Provisional Congress of the Confederate States
- In office February 4, 1861 – April 29, 1861
- Preceded by: New constituency
- Succeeded by: Nicholas Davis Jr.

Personal details
- Born: David Peter Lewis; May 18, 1820 Charlotte County, Virginia, U.S.
- Died: July 3, 1884 (aged 64) Huntsville, Alabama, U.S.
- Resting place: Maple Hill Cemetery, Huntsville, Alabama
- Party: Republican
- Other political affiliations: Democratic

David P. Lewis (born David Peter Lewis; May 18, 1820 – July 3, 1884) was a lawyer and politician who served as the 23rd governor of Alabama from 1872 to 1874 during the Reconstruction era. He was also a Deputy from Alabama to the Provisional Congress of the Confederate States, serving from February until April 1861, when he resigned from office. He was a Unionist. He was the last Republican to serve as Governor of Alabama until H. Guy Hunt was elected in 1986.

== Biography ==
In 1861, David P. Lewis was a Deputy to the Provisional Congress of the Confederate States, representing Alabama. He was a delegate to the 1868 Democratic National Convention. In 1869, he joined the Republican Party. As a well-known North Alabama Unionist who nevertheless supported the Confederate States of America, he was an attractive candidate for governor. He won decisively over Democrat Thomas Herndon. The 1872 election was highly controversial, and conflicting election returns resulted in the seating of two different legislatures controlled by each party. During his term, unsuccessful attempts were made to pass civil rights legislation that would have barred discrimination by common carriers, hotels, schools, and theaters. The impact of the Panic of 1873, as well as the civil rights controversies, led to Lewis' defeat in 1874. Lewis later unsuccessfully sought an appointment to the federal bench. Disillusioned by politics, he returned to the practice of law in Huntsville, where he is interred at Maple Hill Cemetery. He never married and died at age 64 in Huntsville, Alabama.

== See also ==
- List of governors of Alabama

Party political offices
Preceded by William Hugh Smith	Republican nominee for Governor of Alabama; 1872, 1874	Succeeded by Noadiah Woodruff
Political offices
New constituency	Deputy from Alabama to the Provisional Congress of the Confederate States; 1861	Succeeded by Nicholas Davis Jr.
Preceded by Robert B. Lindsay	Governor of Alabama; 1872–1874	Succeeded by George S. Houston
