= Marie Louise Obenauer =

American pioneer in labor laws (1870–1947)

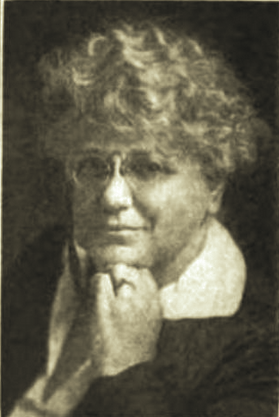
- Obenauer in 1916
- Born: July 17, 1870; Saginaw, Michigan, U.S.
- Died: January 7, 1947 (aged 76); Washington, D.C., U.S.
- Education: University of Michigan

Marie Louise Obenauer (July 17, 1870 – January 7, 1947) was an American pioneer in labor laws for women and children. In 1918, Obenauer was the head of the women's examiners of the National War Labor Board, the object of which was to guard the rights and provide for the needs of employed women. She also worked with the U.S. Department of Labor's Bureau of Labor Statistics, and the women's branch of the industrial service section of the U.S. Army Air Service.

== Early life and education ==
Marie Louise Obenauer was born in Saginaw, Michigan on July 17, 1870. Her parents were Henry G. and Emma (Lippert) Obenauer. Her brother, Victor J. Obenauer, was managing editor of The Dispatch in Anderson, Indiana.

In 1883, Obenauer graduated with an A.B. degree from the University of Michigan.

== Career ==
She was a literary critic and second editorial writer for The St. Paul Globe, 1897–99. During the period of 1900–10, she served as editor of the Saint Paul, Minnesota Courant. Obenauer was the author of numerous brochures, articles and government bulletins on women in industry, conditions of life among wage-earners, and similar subjects.

Obenauer held positions as Chief of Woman's Division, Bureau of Labor Statistics in Washington, D.C., as Chief Woman Administrative Examiner at the National War Labor Board, and Director, Industrial Survey and Research Service in Washington, D.C. Under the Federal Coal Commission, she served as chief of the division investigating living conditions.

== Death ==
On January 7, 1947, Obenauer died at her home on New Hampshire Avenue in Washington, D.C., at age 76.

== Selected works ==
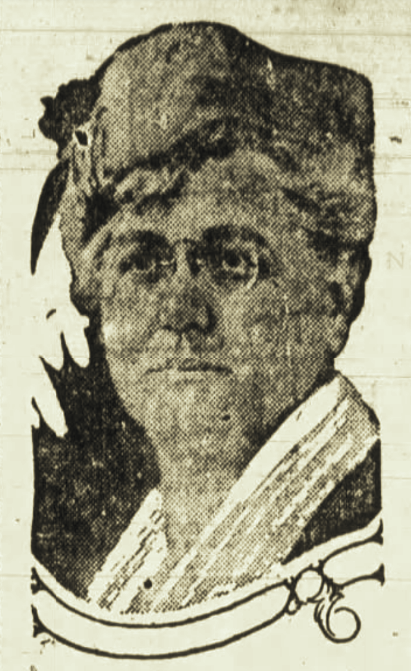
Obenauer in The Times Tribune in 1918

=== Bulletins ===
- Hours, Earnings, and Duration of Employment of Wage-earning Women in Selected Industries in the District of Columbia (U.S. Government Printing Office, 1913) (text)
- Employment of Women in Power Laundries in Milwaukee: A Study of Working Conditions and of the Physical Demands of the Various Laundry Occupations. (U.S. Government Printing Office, 1913)
- Working Hours of Women in the Pea Canneries of Wisconsin (1913) (text)
- Hours, Earnings, and Duration of Employment of Wage-earning Women in Selected Industries in the District of Columbia (1913) (text)
- Hours, Earnings, and Conditions of Labor of Women in Indiana Mercantile Establishments and Garment Factories (U.S. Government Printing Office, 1914)

=== Articles ===
- "Effect of Minimum-wage Determinations in Oregon: July, 1915" (United States. Bureau of Labor Statistics, 1915)
