= 1872 Alabama gubernatorial election =

- November 5, 1872
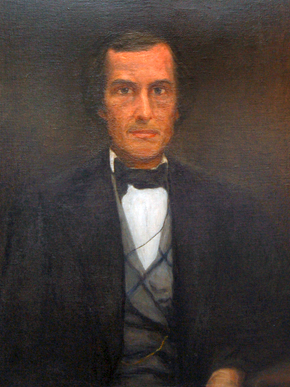

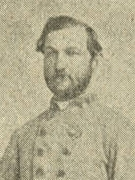
Nominee	David P. Lewis	Thomas H. Herndon
Party	Republican	Democratic
Popular vote	89,868	81,371
Percentage	52.48%	47.52%
- County results Lewis: 50–60% 60–70% 70–80% 80–90% Herndon: 50–60% 60–70% 70–80% 80–90%
Governor before election
Robert B. Lindsay
Democratic
Elected Governor
David P. Lewis
Republican

The 1872 Alabama gubernatorial election took place on November 5, 1872, in order to elect the governor of Alabama. Republican David P. Lewis, a former Democrat and Confederate deputy, narrowly defeated former Confederate Army officer Thomas H. Herndon of the Democratic party by a margin of 4.48%. Alabama became the only state in the former Confederacy where Republicans regained power during Reconstruction after the state had been "redeemed" by the Democrats. This would be the last time until 1986 in which a Republican was elected governor of Alabama.

== Results ==
1872 Alabama gubernatorial election
Party	Candidate	Votes	%
Republican	David P. Lewis	89,868	52.48
Democratic	Thomas H. Herndon	81,371	47.52
Total votes		171,239	100.00
Republican gain from Democratic			
