= William Hugh Smith =

American politician

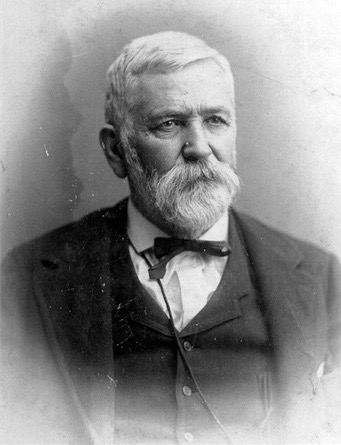

21st Governor of Alabama
- In office July 24, 1868 – November 26, 1870
- Lieutenant: Andrew J. Applegate (1868–70); Vacant (1870)
- Preceded by: Wager Swayne
- Succeeded by: Robert B. Lindsay

Member of the Alabama House of Representatives
- In office 1855–1859

Personal details
- Born: William Hugh Smith; April 26, 1826 New York City, U.S.
- Died: January 1, 1899 (aged 72) Birmingham, Alabama, U.S.
- Resting place: Oak Hill Cemetery (Birmingham, Alabama)
- Party: Republican; Democratic

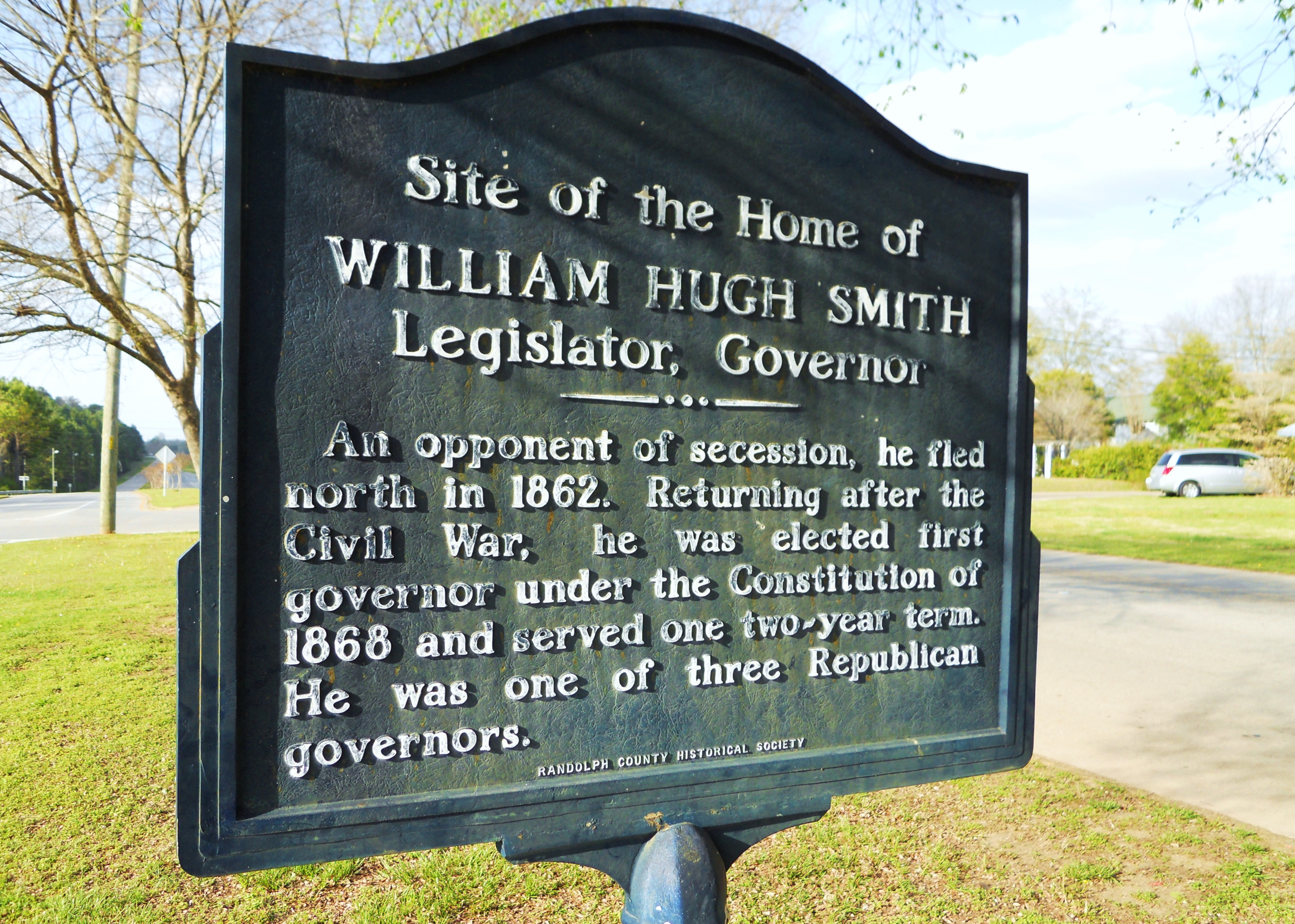
Located along N. Main Street (U.S. Route 431) in Wedowee, Alabama, this historical marker marks the site of the former home of William Hugh Smith.

William Hugh Smith (April 26, 1826 – January 1, 1899) was an American planter and politician, the 21st governor of Alabama. He was the first Republican elected as governor in the state, serving from 1868 to 1870 during the period of Reconstruction. A former slave owner, he had opposed secession from the United States on the grounds it would imperil slavery. He appeared driven by practical consideration rather than principled opposition to slavery.

== Political career ==
From 1855 to 1859, Smith served in the Alabama House of Representatives as a "states' rights" Democrat, but he evolved into a strong Unionist. In 1862, he escaped to the Northern United States and spent the rest of the war recruiting soldiers for the 1st Alabama Union Cavalry Regiment. He went with this regiment on General William Tecumseh Sherman's famous "March to the Sea."

After the war, Smith chaired the first statewide Republican convention in 1867. He was installed as Governor of Alabama by the U.S. Congress in July 1868. Although he had been elected in February 1868, Smith would not voluntarily take office due to voters failing to ratify the 1868 constitution. A conservative once in office, he supported the restoration of voting rights for ex-confederate public officials and military officers, who had been temporarily disenfranchised. He took only light action against the Ku Klux Klan, arguing that local law enforcement could effectively handle the situation. He promoted economic and railroad development, for the South was behind in investing in infrastructure. Its planter elite had reserved their money for private projects.

He was defeated for re-election by Robert Lindsay by fewer than 1500 votes: Lindsay had 77,721 to Smith's 76,292.

Smith remained active in the Republican Party. In 1873, Governor David P. Lewis appointed him as a Circuit Judge. He was the 6th Chairman of the Alabama Republican Party, serving in the post from 1875 to 1878. He was a Federal District Attorney under President James A. Garfield. He died in Birmingham at the age of 72, where he was buried at Oak Hill Cemetery.

Smith's son, John A. W. Smith, unsuccessfully ran for governor of Alabama in 1902 as a Republican.

Party political offices
First	Republican nominee for Governor of Alabama; 1868, 1870	Succeeded by David P. Lewis
Political offices
Preceded by Wager Swayne	Governor of Alabama; 1868–1870	Succeeded by Robert B. Lindsay
