= Robert B. Lindsay =

American politician (1824–1902)

Robert Burns Lindsay
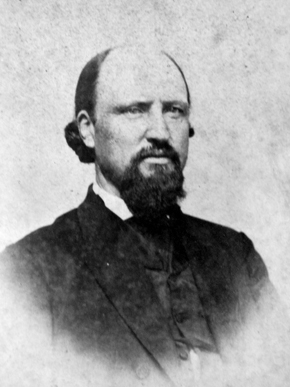

22nd Governor of Alabama
- In office November 26, 1870 – November 17, 1872
- Lieutenant: Edward H. Moren
- Preceded by: William Hugh Smith
- Succeeded by: David P. Lewis

Personal details
- Born: July 4, 1824 Lochmaben, Dumfriesshire, Scotland
- Died: February 13, 1902 (aged 77) Tuscumbia, Alabama, U.S.
- Resting place: Winston Family Cemetery, Tuscumbia, Alabama
- Party: Democratic
- Spouse: Sarah Miller Winston
- Education: –University of St Andrews

Robert Burns Lindsay (July 4, 1824 – February 13, 1902) was a Scots-American politician, elected as the 22nd governor of Alabama during Reconstruction, and serving one term from 1870 to 1872.

== Early life ==
Robert B. Lindsay was born in Lochmaben, Dumfriesshire, Scotland, on July 4, 1824. He studied at the University of St Andrews before emigrating to the United States in 1844. He served in the Alabama House of Representatives in 1853 and the Alabama Senate in 1857, 1865, and 1870.

== 1870 political campaign ==
A Democrat, Lindsay was elected governor in 1870, following a year of white terrorism against black people: violence, including murders, and intimidation of black and white Republicans and freedmen supporters. For example, five Republicans, four black and one white, were lynched in Calhoun County; three black people (two who were Republican politicians) were murdered in Greene County, in March and October; the white Republican County Solicitor was murdered there in March; and on October 25, a Republican rally of 2,000 black people was disrupted by a mob of whites, who killed four black people and wounded 54 in the Eutaw riot. Black people were intimidated and stayed home from the polls, with Democratic white voters in Greene County and elsewhere taking the state for Lindsay. Once elected governor, Lindsay ensured a reduction in violence, especially at the hands of the Ku Klux Klan.

He died in Tuscumbia, Alabama on February 13, 1902.

== See also ==
- List of United States governors born outside the United States

Party political offices
Vacant Title last held by Michael J. Bulger	Democratic nominee for Governor of Alabama; 1870	Vacant Title next held by George S. Houston
Political offices
Preceded by William H. Smith	Governor of Alabama; 1870–1872	Succeeded by David P. Lewis
