= Union, Alabama =

- Town
- Location of Union in Greene County, Alabama.
- Coordinates: 32°59′48″N 87°54′22″W
- Country: United States
- State: Alabama
- County: Greene

Area
  - Total: 0.82 sq mi (2.13 km^{2})
  - Land: 0.82 sq mi (2.13 km^{2})
  - Water: 0 sq mi (0.00 km^{2})
- Elevation: 282 ft (86 m)

Population (2020)
  - Total: 180
  - Density: 219.2/sq mi (84.64/km^{2})
- Time zone: UTC-6 (Central (CST))
  - Summer (DST): UTC-5 (CDT)
- FIPS code: 01-77616
- GNIS feature ID: 2406776

Union is a town in rural Greene County, Alabama, United States. Per the 2020 census, the population was 180. According to the 1980 U.S. Census, it was incorporated in the 1970s.

== Geography ==
Union is located in northern Greene County 11 miles (18 km) north of Eutaw, the county seat, via U.S. Route 11/43 and Martin Luther King Highway.

According to the U.S. Census Bureau, the town has a total area of 0.8 square miles (2.1 km^{2}), all land.

== Demographics ==
Historical population
| Census | Pop. | Note | %± |
|---|---|---|---|
| 1970 | 231 | | — |
| 1980 | 358 | | 55.0% |
| 1990 | 321 | | −10.3% |
| 2000 | 227 | | −29.3% |
| 2010 | 237 | | 4.4% |
| 2020 | 180 | | −24.1% |
U.S. Decennial Census; 2013 Estimate

=== 2020 census ===
Union town, Alabama – Racial and ethnic composition Note: the US Census treats Hispanic/Latino as an ethnic category. This table excludes Latinos from the racial categories and assigns them to a separate category. Hispanics/Latinos may be of any race.
| Race / Ethnicity (NH = Non-Hispanic) | Pop 2010 | Pop 2020 | % 2010 | % 2020 |
|---|---|---|---|---|
| White alone (NH) | 8 | 0 | 3.38% | 0.00% |
| Black or African American alone (NH) | 226 | 176 | 95.36% | 97.78% |
| Native American or Alaska Native alone (NH) | 2 | 0 | 0.84% | 0.00% |
| Asian alone (NH) | 0 | 0 | 0.00% | 0.00% |
| Pacific Islander alone (NH) | 0 | 0 | 0.00% | 0.00% |
| Some Other Race alone (NH) | 0 | 2 | 0.00% | 1.11% |
| Mixed Race or Multi-Racial (NH) | 0 | 0 | 0.00% | 0.00% |
| Hispanic or Latino (any race) | 1 | 2 | 0.42% | 1.11% |
| Total | 237 | 180 | 100.00% | 100.00% |

=== 2000 Census ===
As of the census of 2000, there were 227 people, 85 households, and 53 families residing in the town. The population density was 276.8 inhabitants per square mile (106.9/km^{2}). There were 103 housing units at an average density of 125.6 per square mile (48.5/km^{2}). The racial makeup of the town was 7.93% White and 92.07% Black or African American.

There were 85 households, out of which 32.9% had children under the age of 18 living with them, 41.2% were married couples living together, 18.8% had a female householder with no husband present, and 37.6% were non-families. 35.3% of all households were made up of individuals, and 10.6% had someone living alone who was 65 years of age or older. The average household size was 2.67 and the average family size was 3.58.

In the town, the population was spread out, with 27.8% under the age of 18, 11.5% from 18 to 24, 27.3% from 25 to 44, 21.6% from 45 to 64, and 11.9% who were 65 years of age or older. The median age was 37 years. For every 100 females, there were 106.4 males. For every 100 females age 18 and over, there were 92.9 males.

The median income for a household in the town was $22,031, and the median income for a family was $28,125. Males had a median income of $30,625 versus $17,083 for females. The per capita income for the town was $10,842. About 36.4% of families and 32.6% of the population were below the poverty line, including 42.5% of those under the age of eighteen and 60.0% of those 65 or over.
