= Greene County, Alabama =

County in Alabama, United States

- County
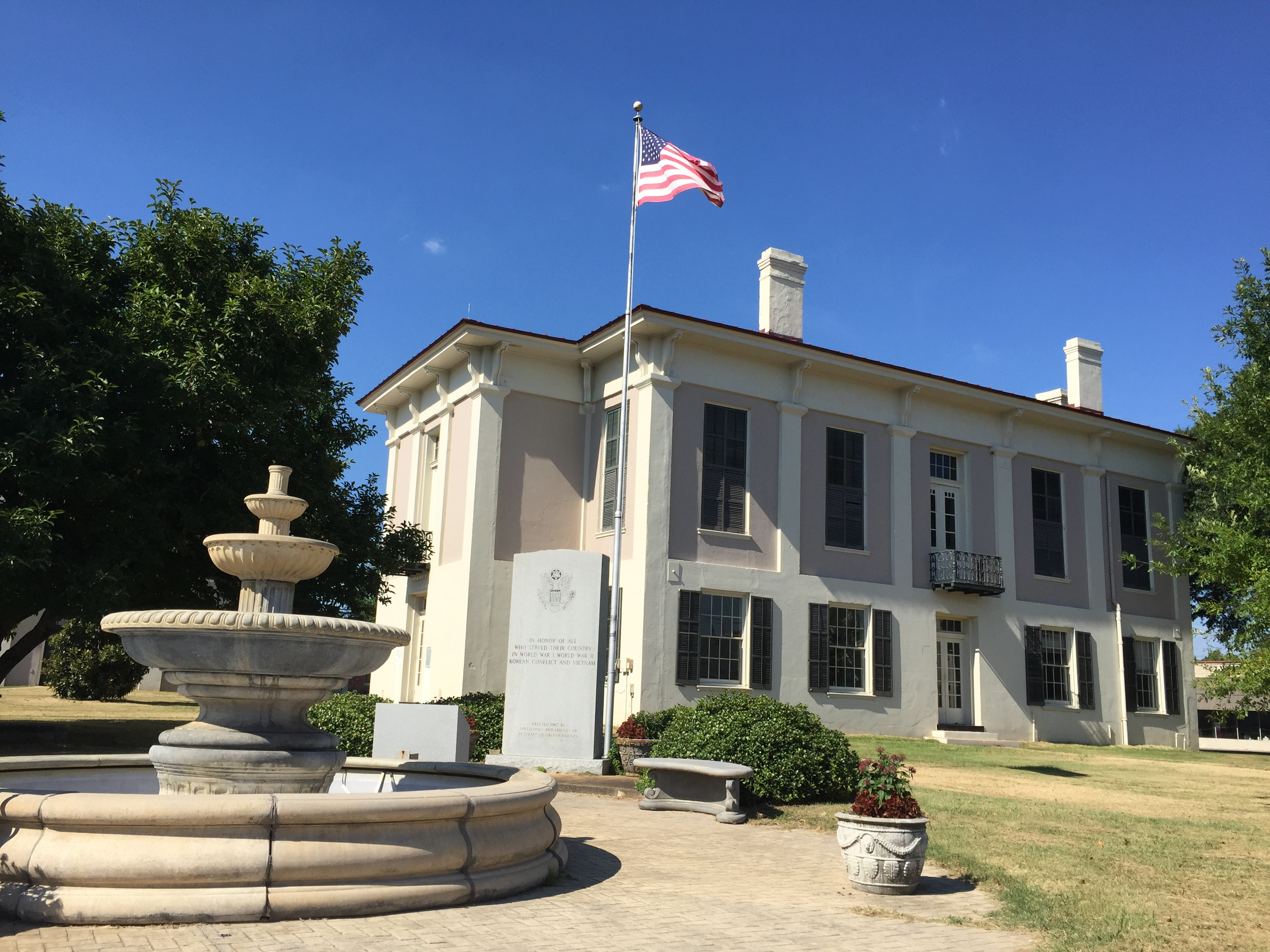
- Greene County Courthouse in Eutaw

- Logo

- Location within the U.S. state of Alabama
- Coordinates: 32°51′08″N 87°57′03″W
- Country: United States
- State: Alabama
- Founded: December 13, 1819
- Named for: Nathanael Greene
- Seat: Eutaw
- Largest city: Eutaw

Area
  - Total: 660 sq mi (1,700 km^{2})
  - Land: 647 sq mi (1,680 km^{2})
  - Water: 13 sq mi (34 km^{2}) 1.9%

Population (2020)
  - Total: 7,730
  - Estimate (2025): 7,067 ▼
  - Density: 11.9/sq mi (4.61/km^{2})
- Time zone: UTC−6 (Central)
  - Summer (DST): UTC−5 (CDT)
- Congressional district: 7th
- Website: greenecountycommission.com
- County Number 35 on Alabama Licence Plates

Greene County is a county located in the west central portion of the U.S. state of Alabama. As of the 2020 census, the population was 7,730, the least populous county in Alabama. Its county seat is Eutaw. It was named in honor of Revolutionary War General Nathanael Greene of Rhode Island.

As of the 2020 census, the county's population was 81% African American, making it the fourth-most heavily black county by proportion in the United States, and the most black county among all counties located outside of the state of Mississippi. It is documented as one of the unhealthiest counties in the United States, with a population with an obesity percentage of 46.3 percent, the highest of any county in the state, and second to only Claiborne County in the western portion of neighboring Mississippi. The life expectancy there is 74.9 years, over 2 years lower than the national average.

== History ==
Greene County was established on December 13, 1819. Eutaw was established as the county seat in 1838, when the seat was moved from Erie. Eutaw is more centrally located.

Being designated as the seat of government stimulated growth in Eutaw.

=== Reconstruction era (1865–1876) ===
In 1867 the Reconstruction legislature organized Hale County, taking much of it from the eastern part of Greene County, plus sections of other neighboring counties. This was a period of continuing insurgency by whites, who attempted to maintain dominance over blacks. The latter comprised a majority in Greene County and others in the Black Belt.

The Greene County Courthouse in Eutaw was burned by arson in 1868, in a year with considerable election-associated violence throughout the South. On March 31, 1870, there were at least two insurgent attacks in Greene County. James Martin, a prominent black Republican, was shot and wounded by unidentified gunmen near his home in Union, Alabama. When a physician tried to remove the bullet to help him, the gunmen interrupted and took Martin away. He was "disappeared", believed dead.

That same night, Republican County Solicitor, Alexander Boyd, a white native of South Carolina and Alabama resident, was murdered by the Ku Klux Klan in his hotel in Eutaw. The prevailing theory by historians for the burning of the courthouse is that the records of some 1,800 suits by freedmen against planters were about to be prosecuted; the fire destroyed the documents. The deaths of Martin and Boyd were typical of the KKK, who attacked Republican officeholders and freedmen sympathizers, in addition to freedmen, especially politicians.

Although Governor William Hugh Smith sent a special agent, John Minnis, to explore these deaths, he said he was unable to identify Boyd's killers. (Minnis later served as US Attorney and prosecuted Klansmen under the Enforcement Acts.) He suggested that the killers had come from Mississippi. A grand jury was called on Boyd's death, but no one was prosecuted. No grand jury was called for Martin's disappearance and presumed death.

In the fall of 1870, two more black Republicans were killed in violence before the election. At a Republican rally on October 25, 1870, attracting 2,000 blacks in Eutaw, white Klansmen attacked the crowd in the courthouse square, leaving at least four blacks dead and 54 wounded. After this, most blacks stayed away from the polls or voted Democratic out of fear of reprisals; the Democratic gubernatorial candidate carried Greene County.

=== Civil Rights Era (1964–1970) ===
On July 30, 1969, Greene County made history when it became "the first in the South since reconstruction with both the commission and the school board dominated by Negroes." Barred from the ballot in the November 1968 general election, the new "National Democratic Party of Alabama" filed suit in federal court and a special election was ordered. In the new vote, African-American candidates won four of the five seats on the Greene County Commission, and two additional seats on the five-member Greene County School Board, and the Montgomery Advertiser would note the next day that "the election gave blacks control of both major governing bodies— a first in Alabama." The date of the vote would later be described as "a watershed for black political empowerment in Alabama", leading to African-American candidates finally winning the right to govern counties where white residents were the minority.

== Geography ==
According to the United States Census Bureau, the county has a total area of 660 square miles (1,700 km^{2}), of which 647 square miles (1,680 km^{2}) is land and 13 square miles (34 km^{2}) (1.9%) is water. Over 90% of Greene County's boundaries are dictated by the Tombigbee, Black Warrior, and Sipsey Rivers and much of the county is dominated by the valleys of the three rivers.

=== Major highways ===
- Interstate 20 / Interstate 59
- U.S. Route 11 / State Route 7 (unsigned)
- U.S. Route 43 / State Route 13 (unsigned)
- State Route 14
- State Route 39

=== Adjacent counties ===
- Pickens County (north)
- Tuscaloosa County (northeast)
- Hale County (east)
- Marengo County (south)
- Sumter County (southwest)

== Demographics ==
In 1867, a chunk of the county and associated population was taken to form Hale County. This resulted in an apparent 40% loss in population between 1860 and 1870. In the 20th century, there were population losses after agricultural decline and the migration of rural workers to cities in other areas.

Historical population
Census	Pop.	Note	%±
1820	4,554		—
1830	15,026		230.0%
1840	24,024		59.9%
1850	31,441		30.9%
1860	30,859		−1.9%
1870	18,399		−40.4%
1880	21,931		19.2%
1890	22,007		0.3%
1900	24,182		9.9%
1910	22,717		−6.1%
1920	18,133		−20.2%
1930	19,745		8.9%
1940	19,185		−2.8%
1950	16,482		−14.1%
1960	13,600		−17.5%
1970	10,650		−21.7%
1980	11,021		3.5%
1990	10,153		−7.9%
2000	9,974		−1.8%
2010	9,045		−9.3%
2020	7,730		−14.5%
2025 (est.)	7,067	▼	−8.6%
U.S. Decennial Census; 1790–1960 1900–1990; 1990–2000 2010–2020

=== Racial and ethnic composition ===
Greene County, Alabama – Racial and ethnic composition Note: the US Census treats Hispanic/Latino as an ethnic category. This table excludes Latinos from the racial categories and assigns them to a separate category. Hispanics/Latinos may be of any race.
Race / Ethnicity (NH = Non-Hispanic)	Pop 1980	Pop 1990	Pop 2000	Pop 2010	Pop 2020	% 1980	% 1990	% 2000	% 2010	% 2020
White alone (NH)	2,389	1,966	1,898	1,562	1,285	21.68%	19.36%	19.03%	17.27%	16.62%
Black or African American alone (NH)	8,437	8,160	7,964	7,349	6,227	76.55%	80.37%	79.85%	81.25%	80.56%
Native American or Alaska Native alone (NH)	2	3	12	11	5	0.02%	0.03%	0.12%	0.12%	0.06%
Asian alone (NH)	5	0	8	15	7	0.05%	0.00%	0.08%	0.17%	0.09%
Native Hawaiian or Pacific Islander alone (NH)	x	x	0	0	0	x	x	0.00%	0.00%	0.00%
Other race alone (NH)	13	0	7	0	11	0.12%	0.00%	0.07%	0.00%	0.14%
Mixed race or Multiracial (NH)	x	x	27	39	134	x	x	0.27%	0.43%	1.73%
Hispanic or Latino (any race)	175	24	58	69	61	1.59%	0.24%	0.58%	0.76%	0.79%
Total	11,021	10,153	9,974	9,045	7,730	100.00%	100.00%	100.00%	100.00%	100.00%

=== 2020 census ===
As of the 2020 census, the county had a population of 7,730. The median age was 44.6 years. 21.5% of residents were under the age of 18 and 22.1% of residents were 65 years of age or older. For every 100 females there were 89.2 males, and for every 100 females age 18 and over there were 85.4 males age 18 and over.

The racial makeup of the county was 16.8% White, 80.8% Black or African American, 0.1% American Indian and Alaska Native, 0.1% Asian, 0.0% Native Hawaiian and Pacific Islander, 0.4% from some other race, and 1.8% from two or more races. Hispanic or Latino residents of any race comprised 0.8% of the population.

0.0% of residents lived in urban areas, while 100.0% lived in rural areas.

There were 3,388 households in the county, of which 26.7% had children under the age of 18 living with them and 43.7% had a female householder with no spouse or partner present. About 37.9% of all households were made up of individuals and 17.3% had someone living alone who was 65 years of age or older.

There were 4,205 housing units, of which 19.4% were vacant. Among occupied housing units, 68.5% were owner-occupied and 31.5% were renter-occupied. The homeowner vacancy rate was 1.5% and the rental vacancy rate was 6.8%.

=== 2010 census ===
As of the 2010 United States census, there were 9,045 people living in the county. 81.5% were Black or African American, 17.4% White, 0.2% Native American, 0.2% Asian, 0.3% of some other race and 0.5% of two or more races. 0.8% were Hispanic or Latino (of any race).

=== 2000 census ===
As of the census of 2000, there were 9,974 people, 3,931 households, and 2,649 families living in the county. The population density was 15 people per square mile (5.8 people/km^{2}). There were 5,117 housing units at an average density of 8 units per square mile (3.1 units/km^{2}). The racial makeup of the county was 19.09% White, 80.34% Black or African American, 0.12% Native American, 0.08% Asian, 0.10% from other races, and 0.27% from two or more races. 0.58% of the population were Hispanic or Latino of any race.

There were 3,931 households, out of which 32.70% had children under the age of 18 living with them, 36.40% were married couples living together, 27.10% had a female householder with no husband present, and 32.60% were non-families. 30.80% of all households were made up of individuals, and 12.30% had someone living alone who was 65 years of age or older. The average household size was 2.52 and the average family size was 3.16.

In the county, the population was spread out, with 29.20% under the age of 18, 8.90% from 18 to 24, 25.10% from 25 to 44, 22.10% from 45 to 64, and 14.70% who were 65 years of age or older. The median age was 36 years. For every 100 females, there were 88.40 males. For every 100 females age 18 and over, there were 79.00 males.

The median income for a household in the county was $19,819, and the median income for a family was $24,604. Males had a median income of $25,707 versus $19,051 for females. The per capita income for the county was $13,686. About 29.90% of families and 34.30% of the population were below the poverty line, including 44.10% of those under age 18 and 31.60% of those age 65 or over.

== Government ==
Greene County is strongly Democratic, but the nature of the membership has changed since the late 20th century. After the Civil War, conservative whites of the South continued in the Democratic Party. After being emancipated and gaining the franchise, African Americans generally joined the Republican Party of President Abraham Lincoln. After African Americans were disfranchised in Alabama in 1901 and other former Confederate states, the Democratic Party was even more exclusively white in Greene County and throughout the South. In the late 20th century, after civil rights legislation enabled African Americans to vote again, they joined the national Democratic Party.

The last Republican to win the county in a presidential election was Barry Goldwater in the 1964. It was only one of nine counties to back Goldwater and McGovern, all of which are located in the Deep South. (Note: The other counties to vote for both Goldwater and McGovern were the nearby "Black Belt" counties of Bullock, Lowndes, Sumter, and Wilcox in Alabama, the majority-black Mississippi counties of Claiborne, Holmes, and Jefferson, and West Feliciana Parish, Louisiana) Since then, the county has been one of the most Democratic in the state of Alabama, supporting the candidates of that party by overwhelming margins.

United States presidential election results for Greene County, Alabama
Year	Republican		Democratic		Third party(ies)	
Year	No.	%	No.	%	No.	%
1824	283	39.75%	343	48.17%	86	12.08%
1828	344	29.23%	833	70.77%	0	0.00%
1832	0	0.00%	1,082	100.00%	0	0.00%
1836	1,116	62.42%	672	37.58%	0	0.00%
1840	1,366	63.36%	790	36.64%	0	0.00%
1844	1,090	57.10%	819	42.90%	0	0.00%
1848	1,088	60.44%	712	39.56%	0	0.00%
1852	694	55.12%	555	44.08%	10	0.79%
1856	0	0.00%	694	46.96%	784	53.04%
1860	0	0.00%	157	10.34%	1,361	89.66%
1868	2,927	77.11%	869	22.89%	0	0.00%
1872	2,516	67.80%	1,195	32.20%	0	0.00%
1876	2,686	71.80%	1,055	28.20%	0	0.00%
1880	1,463	60.81%	943	39.19%	0	0.00%
1884	1,304	67.60%	625	32.40%	0	0.00%
1888	778	35.67%	1,401	64.24%	2	0.09%
1892	355	11.85%	2,129	71.09%	511	17.06%
1896	503	20.91%	1,864	77.47%	39	1.62%
1900	107	9.82%	964	88.44%	19	1.74%
1904	17	3.42%	477	95.98%	3	0.60%
1908	12	2.73%	423	96.36%	4	0.91%
1912	94	18.22%	418	81.01%	4	0.78%
1916	9	2.30%	383	97.70%	0	0.00%
1920	10	1.88%	520	97.93%	1	0.19%
1924	5	1.20%	408	98.31%	2	0.48%
1928	39	6.09%	601	93.91%	0	0.00%
1932	9	1.30%	665	95.82%	20	2.88%
1936	20	2.26%	861	97.40%	3	0.34%
1940	77	7.93%	894	92.07%	0	0.00%
1944	45	6.23%	676	93.63%	1	0.14%
1948	31	4.73%	0	0.00%	625	95.27%
1952	430	38.91%	674	61.00%	1	0.09%
1956	309	29.60%	691	66.19%	44	4.21%
1960	381	33.93%	723	64.38%	19	1.69%
1964	1,124	65.69%	0	0.00%	587	34.31%
1968	180	4.54%	2,229	56.16%	1,560	39.30%
1972	1,404	29.65%	3,235	68.32%	96	2.03%
1976	903	23.65%	2,900	75.96%	15	0.39%
1980	1,034	22.79%	3,474	76.55%	30	0.66%
1984	1,361	26.13%	3,675	70.55%	173	3.32%
1988	1,048	23.94%	3,295	75.28%	34	0.78%
1992	805	16.49%	3,865	79.18%	211	4.32%
1996	796	17.99%	3,526	79.70%	102	2.31%
2000	850	19.34%	3,504	79.71%	42	0.96%
2004	958	20.18%	3,764	79.28%	26	0.55%
2008	876	16.51%	4,408	83.09%	21	0.40%
2012	804	15.05%	4,521	84.62%	18	0.34%
2016	838	17.17%	4,013	82.23%	29	0.59%
2020	875	18.32%	3,884	81.34%	16	0.34%
2024	885	21.91%	3,133	77.57%	21	0.52%

United States Senate election results for Greene County, Alabama2
Year	Republican		Democratic		Third party(ies)	
Year	No.	%	No.	%	No.	%
2020	816	17.07%	3,962	82.90%	1	0.02%

United States Senate election results for Greene County, Alabama3
Year	Republican		Democratic		Third party(ies)	
Year	No.	%	No.	%	No.	%
2022	597	20.13%	2,337	78.79%	32	1.08%

Alabama Gubernatorial election results for Greene County
Year	Republican		Democratic		Third party(ies)	
Year	No.	%	No.	%	No.	%
2022	608	20.32%	2,339	78.18%	45	1.50%

== Communities ==
=== City ===
- Eutaw (county seat)

=== Towns ===
- Boligee
- Forkland
- Union

=== Unincorporated communities ===
- Clinton
- Jena
- Knoxville
- Mantua
- Mount Hebron
- Pleasant Ridge
- Tishabee
- West Greene

== See also ==
- National Register of Historic Places listings in Greene County, Alabama
- Properties on the Alabama Register of Landmarks and Heritage in Greene County, Alabama
