= 1938 in the United States =

- Decades: 1910s; 1920s; 1930s; 1940s; 1950s
- See also: History of the United States (1918–1945); Timeline of United States history (1930–1949); List of years in the United States

Events from the year 1938 in the United States.

== Incumbents ==
=== Federal government ===
- President: Franklin D. Roosevelt (D-New York)
- Vice President: John Nance Garner (D-Texas)
- Chief Justice: Charles Evans Hughes (New York)
- Speaker of the House of Representatives: William B. Bankhead (D-Alabama)
- Senate Majority Leader: Alben W. Barkley (D-Kentucky)
- Congress: 75th

==== State governments ====
Governors and lieutenant governors

=== Governors ===
- Governor of Alabama: Bibb Graves (Democratic)
- Governor of Arizona: Rawghlie Clement Stanford (Democratic)
- Governor of Arkansas: Carl Edward Bailey (Democratic)
- Governor of California: Frank Merriam (Republican)
- Governor of Colorado: Teller Ammons (Democratic)
- Governor of Connecticut: Wilbur Lucius Cross (Democratic)
- Governor of Delaware: Richard C. McMullen (Democratic)
- Governor of Florida: Fred P. Cone (Democratic)
- Governor of Georgia: Eurith D. Rivers (Democratic)
- Governor of Idaho: Barzilla W. Clark (Democratic)
- Governor of Illinois: Henry Horner (Democratic)
- Governor of Indiana: M. Clifford Townsend (Democratic)
- Governor of Iowa: Nelson G. Kraschel (Democratic)
- Governor of Kansas: Walter A. Huxman (Democratic)
- Governor of Kentucky: Happy Chandler (Democratic)
- Governor of Louisiana: Richard W. Leche (Democratic)
- Governor of Maine: Lewis O. Barrows (Republican)
- Governor of Maryland: Harry W. Nice (Republican)
- Governor of Massachusetts: Charles F. Hurley (Democratic)
- Governor of Michigan: Frank Murphy (Democratic)
- Governor of Minnesota: Elmer A. Benson (Farmer-Labor)
- Governor of Mississippi: Hugh L. White (Democratic)
- Governor of Missouri: Lloyd C. Stark (Democratic)
- Governor of Montana: Roy E. Ayers (Democratic)
- Governor of Nebraska: Robert Leroy Cochran (Democratic)
- Governor of Nevada: Richard Kirman, Sr. (Democratic)
- Governor of New Hampshire: Francis P. Murphy (Republican)
- Governor of New Jersey: Harold G. Hoffman (Republican) (until January 18), A. Harry Moore (Democratic) (starting January 18)
- Governor of New Mexico: Clyde Tingley (Democratic)
- Governor of New York: Herbert H. Lehman (Democratic)
- Governor of North Carolina: Clyde R. Hoey (Democratic)
- Governor of North Dakota: William Langer (Republican)
- Governor of Ohio: Martin L. Davey (Democratic)
- Governor of Oklahoma: Ernest W. Marland (Democratic)
- Governor of Oregon: Charles H. Martin (Democratic)
- Governor of Pennsylvania: George Howard Earle III (Democratic)
- Governor of Rhode Island: Robert E. Quinn (Democratic)
- Governor of South Carolina: Olin D. Johnston (Democratic)
- Governor of South Dakota: Leslie Jensen (Republican)
- Governor of Tennessee: Gordon Browning (Democratic)
- Governor of Texas: James V. Allred (Democratic)
- Governor of Utah: Henry H. Blood (Democratic)
- Governor of Vermont: George David Aiken (Republican)
- Governor of Virginia: George C. Peery (Democratic) (until January 15), James H. Price (Democratic) (starting January 15)
- Governor of Washington: Clarence D. Martin (Democratic)
- Governor of West Virginia: Homer A. Holt (Democratic)
- Governor of Wisconsin: Philip La Follette (Wisconsin Progressive)
- Governor of Wyoming: Leslie A. Miller (Democratic)

=== Lieutenant governors ===
- Lieutenant Governor of Alabama: Thomas E. Knight (Democratic)
- Lieutenant Governor of Arkansas: Robert L. Bailey (Democratic)
- Lieutenant Governor of California: George J. Hatfield (Republican)
- Lieutenant Governor of Colorado: Frank J. Hayes (Democratic)
- Lieutenant Governor of Connecticut: T. Frank Hayes (Democratic)
- Lieutenant Governor of Delaware: Edward W. Cooch (Democratic)
- Lieutenant Governor of Idaho: Charles C. Gossett (Democratic)
- Lieutenant Governor of Illinois: John H. Stelle (Democratic)
- Lieutenant Governor of Indiana: Henry F. Schricker (Democratic)
- Lieutenant Governor of Iowa: John K. Valentine (Democratic)
- Lieutenant Governor of Kansas: William M. Lindsay (Democratic)
- Lieutenant Governor of Kentucky: Keen Johnson (Democratic)
- Lieutenant Governor of Louisiana: Earl K. Long (Democratic)
- Lieutenant Governor of Massachusetts: Francis E. Kelly (Democratic)
- Lieutenant Governor of Michigan: Leo J. Nowicki (Democratic)
- Lieutenant Governor of Minnesota: Gottfrid Lindsten (Republican)
- Lieutenant Governor of Mississippi: Jacob Buehler Snider (Democratic)
- Lieutenant Governor of Missouri: Frank Gaines Harris (Democratic)
- Lieutenant Governor of Montana: Hugh R. Adair (Democratic)
- Lieutenant Governor of Nebraska: Walter H. Jurgensen (Democratic) (until November 8), Nate M. Parsons (Democratic) (starting November 8)
- Lieutenant Governor of Nevada: Fred S. Alward (political party unknown)
- Lieutenant Governor of New Mexico: Hiram M. Dow (Democratic)
- Lieutenant Governor of New York: M. William Bray (Democratic) (until end of December 31)
- Lieutenant Governor of North Carolina: Wilkins P. Horton (Democratic)
- Lieutenant Governor of North Dakota: Thorstein H. H. Thoresen (Republican)
- Lieutenant Governor of Ohio: Paul P. Yoder (Democratic)
- Lieutenant Governor of Oklahoma: James E. Berry (Democratic)
- Lieutenant Governor of Pennsylvania: Thomas Kennedy (Democratic)
- Lieutenant Governor of Rhode Island: Raymond E. Jordan (Democratic)
- Lieutenant Governor of South Carolina: Joseph Emile Harley (Democratic)
- Lieutenant Governor of South Dakota: Donald McMurchie (Republican)
- Lieutenant Governor of Tennessee: Bryan Pope (Democratic)
- Lieutenant Governor of Texas: Walter Frank Woodul (Democratic)
- Lieutenant Governor of Vermont: William H. Wills (Republican)
- Lieutenant Governor of Virginia: James H. Price (Democratic) (until January 15), Saxon W. Holt (Democratic) (starting January 15)
- Lieutenant Governor of Washington: Victor A. Meyers (Democratic)
- Lieutenant Governor of Wisconsin: vacant (until May 16), Herman L. Ekern (Progressive) (starting May 16)

== Events ==
=== January–March ===
- January 1
  - The California Golden Bears defeat the Alabama Crimson Tide in this year's Rose Bowl Game in college football, with a final score of 13–0.
  - The Merrie Melodies cartoon short Daffy Duck & Egghead is released, being the first cartoon to give Daffy Duck his continuing name, as well as his second appearance.
- January 3 – The March of Dimes is established as a foundation to combat infant polio by President Franklin D. Roosevelt.
- January 11 – Leading Korean dancer Choi Seung-hee arrives in San Francisco to begin her international tour in the United States. She is the first Korean Wave entertainer.
- January 16 – The Famous 1938 Carnegie Hall Jazz Concert is recorded live when Benny Goodman and his orchestra become the first jazz musicians to headline a concert at Carnegie Hall in New York City.
- January 22 – Thornton Wilder's play Our Town is performed for the first time anywhere in Princeton, New Jersey. It premieres in New York City on February 4.
- January 27 – The Niagara Bridge at Niagara Falls, New York collapses due to an ice jam.
- January 28 – The first ski tow in America begins operation in Vermont.
- February 4 – Walt Disney's Snow White and the Seven Dwarfs, the first cel-animated feature in motion picture history, is released in the U.S. following last year's premiere.
- March 3 – The Santa Ana River in California spills over its banks during a rainy winter, killing 58 people in Orange County and causing trouble as far inland as Palm Springs.
- March 10 – The 10th Academy Awards, hosted by Bob Burns, are presented at Biltmore Hotel in Los Angeles, with William Dieterle's The Life of Emile Zola winning the most awards with three, including the Academy Award for Outstanding Production, and receiving the most nominations with ten. Leo McCarey wins Best Director for The Awful Truth.

=== April–June ===
- April 15
  - Huey, Dewey and Louie make their first appearance, in the Disney animated short Donald's Nephews.
  - Vine Street a television soap opera series is first broadcast in Los Angeles.
- April 18 – First appearance of comic book superhero Superman (as a backup story), in Action Comics #1 (cover date June).
- April 25 – Erie Railroad Co. v. Tompkins: The Supreme Court of the U.S. holds that federal courts do not have the judicial power to create general federal common law when hearing state law claims under diversity jurisdiction, overturning almost a century of federal civil procedure case law.
- April 28 – The towns of Dana, Enfield, Greenwich, and Prescott in Massachusetts are disincorporated to make way for the Quabbin Reservoir.
- April 30 – The first cartoon to feature a prototypical Bugs Bunny, Porky's Hare Hunt, is released.
- May 12
  - U.S. Secretary of State Cordell Hull rejects the Soviet Union's offer of a joint defence pact, to counter the rise of Nazi Germany.
  - USS Enterprise is commissioned.
- May 17 – Information Please debuts on NBC Radio.
- June 22 – Heavyweight boxing champion Joe Louis knocks out Max Schmeling in the first round of their rematch at Yankee Stadium in New York City.
- June 23
  - The Civil Aeronautics Act is signed into law, forming the Civil Aeronautics Authority in the U.S. (effective August 22).
  - Marineland opens near St. Augustine, Florida.
- June 24 – A 450-metric-ton (496-short-ton) meteorite explodes about 12 miles (19 km) above the earth near Chicora, Pennsylvania.
- June 25 – Food, Drug and Cosmetic Act is signed into law by president Franklin D. Roosevelt.
- June 29 – Olympic National Park is established in Washington state.

=== July–September ===
- July 3 – The last reunion of the Blue and Gray commemorates the 75th anniversary of the Battle of Gettysburg in Gettysburg, Pennsylvania.
- July 5 – The Non-Intervention Committee reaches an agreement to withdraw all foreign volunteers from the Spanish Civil War. The agreement is respected by most Republican foreign volunteers, notably by those from England and the United States, but is ignored by the governments of Germany and Italy.
- July 6 – The Evian Conference on Refugees is convened in France. No country in Europe is prepared to accept Jews fleeing persecution, and the United States will take only 27,370.
- July 14 – Howard Hughes sets a new record, by completing a 91-hour airplane flight around the world.
- July 18 – Wrong Way Corrigan takes off from New York City, ostensibly heading for California. He lands in Ireland instead.
- July 28 – Pan Am flying boat Hawaii Clipper disappears with 6 passengers and 9 crew members en route from Guam to Manila.
- August 6 – The Looney Tunes animated short Porky & Daffy is released.
- August 18 – The Thousand Islands Bridge, connecting the United States with Canada, is dedicated by U.S. President Franklin D. Roosevelt.
- August 31 – Winston Churchill, still believing France and Britain mean to honor their promises to defend Czechoslovakia against Nazi aggression, suggests in a personal note to Neville Chamberlain that His Majesty's Government may want to set up a broad international alliance including the United States (specifically mentioning U.S. President Franklin D. Roosevelt as possibly receptive to the idea) and the Soviet Union.
- September 4 – During the ceremony marking the unveiling of a plaque at Pointe de Grave, France celebrating Franco-American friendship, U.S. Ambassador William Bullitt in a speech states, "France and the United States were united in war and peace", leading to much speculation in the press that if war did break out over Czechoslovakia, then the United States would join the war on the Allied side.
- September 9 – U.S. President Franklin D. Roosevelt disallows the popular interpretation of Bullitt's speech at a press conference at the White House. Roosevelt states it is “100% wrong” the U.S. would join a “stop-Hitler bloc” under any circumstances, and makes it quite clear that in the event of German aggression against Czechoslovakia, the U.S. would remain neutral.
- September 12 – Hitler makes his much-anticipated closing address at Nuremberg, in which he vehemently attacks the Czech people and President Beneš. American news commentator H. V. Kaltenborn begins his famous marathon of broadcast bulletins over the CBS Radio Network with a summation of Hitler's address.
- September 20 – The first patents for nylon (first synthesized in 1935) are granted in the name of Wallace Carothers to DuPont, which on October 27 announces the new product's name. The first items produced in the new material (February 24) are toothbrush bristles.
- September 21 – The New England Hurricane of 1938 strikes Long Island and southern New England, killing over 300 along the Rhode Island shoreline and approximately 600 in total.
- September 22 – Olsen and Johnson's musical comedy revue Hellzapoppin' begins its 3-year run on Broadway.

=== October–December ===
- October 3 – Production of the Jefferson nickel begins, replacing the buffalo nickel (last struck in April). The new nickel is released on November 15.
- October 9 – The New York Yankees defeat the Chicago Cubs, 4 games to 0, to win their 7th World Series Title.
- October 10 – The Blue Water Bridge opens, connecting Port Huron, Michigan and Sarnia, Ontario.
- October 16 – Winston Churchill, in a broadcast address to the United States, condemns the Munich Agreement as a defeat and calls upon America and western Europe to prepare for armed resistance against Adolf Hitler.
- October 24 – The minimum wage is established by law in the U.S.
- October 30 – Orson Welles's radio adaptation of The War of the Worlds (with script by Howard Koch) is broadcast, causing panic in various parts of the United States.
- October 31 – Great Depression: In an effort to try restore investor confidence, the New York Stock Exchange unveils a 15-point program intended to upgrade protection for the investing public.
- November 1 – Horse racing: Seabiscuit defeats War Admiral by four lengths in their famous match race at Pimlico Race Course in Baltimore, Maryland.
- November 8 – Frank M. Dixon is elected the 40th governor of Alabama defeating W. A. Clardy.
- November 10 – On the eve of Armistice Day, Kate Smith sings Irving Berlin's "God Bless America" for the first time on her weekly radio show.
- November 18 – Trade union members elect John L. Lewis as the first president of the Congress of Industrial Organizations.
- December 15 – President Franklin Roosevelt agrees to lend $25 million to Chiang Kai-shek to help fund his war efforts against Japan. The loan marks the beginning of the relationship between the two leaders.
- December 16 – MGM releases its successful film version of Charles Dickens's A Christmas Carol.

=== Undated ===
- The Dictionary of Occupational Titles is established; it will run until 1998, when it is replaced with the online Occupational Information Network.
- Herbert E. Ives and G. R. Stilwell execute the Ives–Stilwell experiment, showing that ions radiate at frequencies affected by their motion.

=== Ongoing ===
- New Deal (1933–1939)
- Recession of 1937–1938 (1937–1938)

== Births ==
- January 1 – Frank Langella, actor
- January 2
  - Lynn Conway, transgender activist and computer scientist (died 2024)
  - Dana Ulery, computer scientist
- January 4 – Eddie Southern, hurdler (died 2023)
- January 6 – William E. Connolly, political scientist, theorist and academic
- January 7
  - Lou Graham, golfer
  - Fred Whitfield, baseball player (died 2013)
- January 9
  - Peter Edelman, lawyer and educator
  - Stuart Woods, author and critic (died 2022)
- January 10 – Willie McCovey, baseball player (died 2018)
- January 14
  - Bill Plante, journalist (died 2022)
  - Allen Toussaint, R&B musician, songwriter/composer and record producer (died 2015)
- January 18
  - Curt Flood, baseball player (died 1997)
  - Paul G. Kirk, U.S. Senator from Massachusetts from 2009 to 2010
- January 21
  - Sandy Barr, wrestler and referee (died 2007)
  - Wolfman Jack, radio host (died 1995)
- January 22 – Peter Beard, zookeeper, photographer and diarist (died 2020)
- January 31 – James G. Watt, lawyer and politician (died 2023)
- February 4 – Donald Riegle, U.S. Senator from Michigan from 1976 to 1995
- February 12 – Jim Dennison, sports coach and adminidtrator (died 2026)
- March 3 – Patricia MacLachlan, children's writer (died 2022)
- March 4 – Paula Prentiss, actress
- March 5
  - Lynn Margulis, biologist (died 2011)
  - Fred Williamson, football player and actor
- March 7 – David Baltimore, biologist, recipient of the Nobel Prize in Physiology or Medicine in 1975
- March 12 – Ken Spears, writer (died 2020)
- March 16 – Cal Browning, American baseball player (died 2022)
- March 17 – Fred Akers, football player and coach (died 2020)
- March 19 – Joe Kapp, football player and coach (died 2023)
- March 25 – Hoyt Axton, country music singer-songwriter and actor (died 1999)
- March 26 – Nancy Milford, biographer (died 2022)
- March 31 – Jimmy Johnson, football player (died 2024)
- April 2
  - Richard Ellis, marine biologist (died 2024)
  - Oscar Lofton, American football player and coach (died 2026)
- April 3 – John M. Darley, social psychologist (died 2018)
- April 5 – Ronnie White, American musician (died 1995)
- April 7
  - Jerry Brown, governor of California
  - Freddie Hubbard, jazz trumpeter (died 2008)
- April 9 – Tom Metzger, politician, white supremacist, neo-Nazi leader and Klansman (died 2020)
- April 13
  - Russell Ober, member of the New Hampshire House of Representatives.
  - Frederic Rzewski, composer (died 2021)
- April 14 – Lilly Ledbetter, employment discrimination activist (died 2024)
- April 16 – Rich Rollins, baseball player (died 2025)
- April 22 – Barrie R. Cassileth, alternative medicine researcher (died 2022)
- April 23 – Steve Symms, U.S. Senator from Idaho from 1981 to 1993 (died 2024)
- April 25
  - Roger Boisjoly, rocket engineer (died 2012)
  - Jim Simons, investor, mathematician and philanthropist (died 2024)
- April 26 – Duane Eddy, rock guitarist (died 2024)
- April 29 – Bernie Madoff, financier and convicted fraudster (died 2021)
- April 30 – Larry Niven, science fiction writer
- May 9 – Carroll Cole, serial killer (died 1985)
- May 10
  - Henry Fambrough, soul singer (died 2024)
  - James Hedges, politician (died 2024)
- May 11 – Bruce Langhorne, folk guitarist (died 2017)
- May 15 – Nancy Garden, author (died 2014)
- May 17 – Marcia Freedman, American-born Israeli social activist (died 2021)
- May 21 – Ross Hagen, screen and voice actor, director, screenwriter and producer (died 2011)
- May 22
  - Richard Benjamin, actor
  - Susan Strasberg, actress (died 1999)
- May 26 – William Bolcom, composer and pianist
- May 28
  - Dale Bell, American TV producer
  - Jerry West, basketball player and executive (died 2024)
- May 31 – Peter Yarrow, singer/songwriter (died 2025)
- June 3
  - Morton Meyerson, computer industry executive (died 2025)
  - David L. Mills, computer scientist and engineer (died 2024)
- June 7 – Goose Gonsoulin, American football player (died 2014)
- June 16 – Joyce Carol Oates, novelist
- June 20 – John Johnson, reporter
- June 21
  - Barbara Carlson, politician (died 2018)
  - Ron Ely, actor (died 2024)
- June 24 – Lawrence Block, crime writer
- June 27 – Jake Crouthamel, American football player and coach (died 2022)
- June 28
  - John Byner, American actor
  - Leon Panetta, 23rd United States Secretary of Defense
- June 30
  - Billy Mills, Olympic athlete
  - Jeri Taylor, television scriptwriter and producer (died 2024)
- July 4
  - John Sterling, sportscaster (died 2026)
  - Bill Withers, African American singer-songwriter (died 2020)
- July 5 – Ronnie Self, singer (died 1981)
- July 6 – Manny Mashouf, Iranian-born businessman and philanthropist
- July 9 – Brian Dennehy, actor (died 2020)
- July 20 – Natalie Wood, actress (died 1981)
- July 21 – Janet Reno, United States Attorney General from 1993 to 2001 (died 2016)
- July 26
  - Bobby Hebb, singer-songwriter (died 2016)
  - Joanne Brackeen, jazz pianist and music educator
- July 29
  - Peter Jennings, journalist (died 2005)
  - Don Wert, baseball player (died 2024)
- August 3 – Maxie Baughan, American football player (died 2023)
- August 7 – Verna Bloom, actress (died 2019)
- August 8 – Connie Stevens, actress, singer and businesswoman
- August 11 – Vada Pinson, baseball player (died 1995)
- August 12 – Thomas J. Donohue, business executive (died 2024)
- August 15
  - Stephen Breyer, Associate Justice of the Supreme Court of the U.S. from 1994 to 2022
  - Maxine Waters, politician
- August 16 – Sherry Combs Johnson, barrel racer (died 2023)
- August 17
  - Wes Hildreth, geologist (died 2025)
  - Trina Robbins, cartoonist (died 2024)
- August 20 – Kaneaster Hodges, Jr., U.S. Senator from Arkansas from 1977 to 1979 (died 2022)
- August 21 – Kenny Rogers, country singer (died 2020)
- August 25 – Iris Falcam, American-Micronesian librarian, researcher and public servant (died 2010)
- August 29
  - Elliott Gould, actor
  - Robert Rubin, banker, 70th United States Secretary of the Treasury
- August 31 – John Koerner, musician (died 2024)
- September 1
  - Alan Dershowitz, lawyer
  - Merlin Nippert, baseball player
- September 2 – Mary Jo Catlett, actress
- September 3 – Dave Ritchie, gridiron football coach (died 2024)
- September 5 – Warren J. Baker, academic administrator (died 2022)
- September 6
  - Dennis Oppenheim, artist (died 2011)
  - Barbara Ann Rowan, attorney (died 2020)
- September 7 – Susan Stamberg, radio journalist (died 2025)
- September 8
  - Bill Byrge, character actor and comedian (died 2025)
  - Philip L. Clarke, voice actor (d. 2013)
  - Sam Nunn, U.S. Senator from Georgia from 1972 to 1997
- September 15 – Gaylord Perry, baseball player (died 2022)
- September 21 – Doug Moe, basketball player and coach (died 2026)
- September 23 – Arie L. Kopelman, businessman and philanthropist (died 2024)
- September 24 – George H. Carley, Chief Justice of the Supreme Court of Georgia (died 2020)
- September 26 – Jonathan Goldsmith, actor
- September 28 – Ben E. King, singer-songwriter (died 2015)
- October 1
  - Mary McFadden, fashion designer (died 2024)
  - Stella Stevens, actress (died 2023)
- October 2
  - Dorothy Pitman Hughes, feminist and child welfare activist (died 2022)
  - Rex Reed, film critic (died 2026)
- October 3
  - Eddie Cochran, rock and roll singer (died 1960)
  - Dave Obey, lawyer and politician
  - Joseph F. Timilty, politician (died 2017)
- October 4 – Loretta Long, actress
- October 6 – Peter F. Donnelly, arts patron, vice-chairman of Americans for the Arts (died 2009)
- October 7 – Mary Ann Glendon, academic lawyer and bioethicist
- October 15 – Brice Marden, painter (died 2023)
- October 17 – Evel Knievel, motorcycle daredevil (died 2007)
- October 18 – Dawn Wells, actress (died 2020)
- October 22 – Christopher Lloyd, actor and entrepreneur
- October 23 – Humpy Wheeler, motorsport executive and businessman (died 2025)
- October 30 – Ed Lauter, actor and comedian (died 2013)
- November 2
  - Pat Buchanan, political commentator
  - Richard Serra, abstract sculptor (died 2024)
- November 3 – Terrence McNally, playwright, librettist and screenwriter (died 2020)
- November 7 – Jim Kaat, baseball player and sportscaster
- November 8 – Satch Sanders, basketball player
- November 12
  - Terry "Buzzy" Johnson, singer-songwriter and music producer (The Flamingos)
  - Delano Lewis, diplomat (died 2023)
- November 13 – Jean Seberg, actress (died 1979)
- November 16 – Robert Nozick, philosopher (died 2002)
- November 19 – Ted Turner, entrepreneur (died 2026)
- November 24
  - Oscar Robertson, African American basketball player
  - Charles Starkweather, spree killer (died 1959)
- November 26 – Elizabeth Bailey, economist (died 2022)
- November 29 – George Yanok, screenwriter and producer (died 2022)
- December 1 – Ralph Smith, American football player (died 2023)
- December 4 – Billy Bryan, baseball player (died 2026)
- December 5 – J. J. Cale, singer-songwriter and guitarist (died 2013)
- December 11 – McCoy Tyner, jazz pianist (died 2020)
- December 13 – Gus Johnson, basketball player (died 1987)
- December 15 – Wes Watkins, politician (died 2025)
- December 16 – Angelo Mozilo, banker (died 2023)
- December 23 – Robert Kahn, Internet pioneer
- December 29 – Jon Voight, actor

== Deaths ==
- January 1 – George H. Collin, politician (born 1856)
- January 9 – Johnny Gruelle, cartoonist and children's book author (born 1880)
- January 10 – William McCall, actor (born 1870)
- January 24 – Rosamond Pinchot, socialite and actress (born 1904)
- January 26 – Zitkala-Sa, Yankton Dakota writer (born 1876)
- February 2 – Frederick William Vanderbilt, railway magnate (born 1856)
- February 7 – Harvey Firestone, tire manufacturer (born 1868)
- February 10 – Richard A. Whiting, composer (born 1890)
- February 17 – T. D. Crittenden, silent film actor (born 1878)
- February 18 – David King Udall, politician (born 1851)
- February 21 – George Ellery Hale, solar astronomer (born 1868)
- March 2 – Ben Harney, composer and pianist (born 1871)
- March 6 – Walt McDougall, cartoonist (born 1858)
- March 13 – Clarence Darrow, attorney (born 1857)
- March 21 – Oscar Apfel, film actor and director (born 1878)
- March 27 – Helen M. Winslow, editor, author, and publisher (born 1851)
- April 5 – Reine Davies, actress (born 1883)
- April 8 – Joe "King" Oliver, jazz cornet player (born 1871)
- April 24 – George Grey Barnard, sculptor (born 1863)
- May 14 – Aaron Daggett, general during the American Civil War (born 1837)
- May 16
  - Fred Baker, physician and naturalist (born 1854)
  - Joseph Strauss, bridge engineer (born 1870)
- May 22 – William Glackens, realist painter (born 1870)
- May 23 – Frederick Ruple, painter (born 1871)
- May 26 – John Jacob Abel, pharmacologist (born 1857)
- June 3 – Carrie Langston Hughes, African-American writer and actress (born 1873)
- June 13 – Beverly Thomas Galloway, plant pathologist (born 1863)
- June 17 – George E. Barnett, economist (born 1873)
- June 26 – James Weldon Johnson, author, politician and diplomat (born 1871)
- June 29 – Frederick William Vanderbilt, railway magnate (born 1856)
- July 7 – Magdalena Hergert Becker, pioneer Mennonite missionary (born 1878)
- July 9
  - Benjamin N. Cardozo, U.S. Supreme Court Justice (born 1870)
  - Mary E. Smith Hayward, businesswoman and suffragist (born 1842)
- July 19 – Harvey Clark, actor (born 1885)
- July 21 – Owen Wister, Western fiction writer and historian (born 1860)
- August 1 – Edmund C. Tarbell, impressionist painter (born 1862)
- August 4 – Pearl White, film actress (born 1889)
- August 9 – W. W. Conner, politician (born 1882)
- August 16 – Robert Johnson, blues singer (born 1911)
- August 17 – Jane Toppan, serial killer (born 1854)
- August 30 – James Scott, ragtime composer (born 1885)
- September 10 – Andrew Breen, Roman Catholic priest and reverend (born 1863)
- September 12 – Robert L. Bacon, politician (born 1884)
- September 15 – Thomas Wolfe, author (born 1900)
- September 19 – Pauline Frederick, stage and film actress (born 1883)
- September 21 – Andrew Arbuckle, actor (born 1887)
- September 25 – Anna Laurens Dawes, author and suffragist (born 1851)
- September 28
  - Con Conrad, songwriter (born 1891)
  - Charles Duryea, engineer and manufacturer of motor vehicles (born 1861)
- October 1 – Conway Tearle, actor (born 1878)
- October 3 – Richard Teller Crane II, diplomat (born 1882)
- October 13 – E. C. Segar, comics artist, creator of Popeye (born 1894)
- October 21 – Dorothy Hale, socialite, suicide (born 1905)
- October 27 – Alma Gluck, soprano (born 1884)
- October 28 – Fred Kohler, actor (born 1888)
- October 30 – Robert Woolsey, film comedian (born 1888)
- November 1 – Charles Weeghman, restaurateur and owner of Chicago Cubs (born 1874)
- November 4 – Samuel W. Bryant, admiral (born 1877)
- November 11 – Mary Mallon (Typhoid Mary), first known (in the United States) asymptomatic carrier of the pathogen associated with typhoid fever (born 1869)
- November 15 – Harry Grant Dart, cartoonist (born 1868)
- December 16 – Ed Davis, criminal (born 1900)
- December 20
  - Annie Armstrong, missionary leader (born 1850)
  - Edwin Hall, physicist (born 1855)
  - Matilda Howell, archer (born 1859)
- December 25 – Richard Henry Cummings, actor (born 1858)
- December 31 – Lucien Grant Berry, general (born 1863)

== See also ==
- List of American films of 1938
- Timeline of United States history (1930–1949)
