= 1857 in the United States =

- Decades: 1830s; 1840s; 1850s; 1860s; 1870s
- See also: History of the United States (1849–1865); Timeline of United States history (1820–1859); List of years in the United States

Events from the year 1857 in the United States.

== Incumbents ==
=== Federal government ===
- President:

Franklin Pierce (D-New Hampshire) (until March 4)
James Buchanan (D-Pennsylvania) (starting March 4)

- Vice President:

vacant (until March 4)
John C. Breckinridge (D-Kentucky) (starting March 4)

- Chief Justice: Roger B. Taney (Maryland)
- Speaker of the House of Representatives:

Nathaniel P. Banks (American-Massachusetts) (until March 4)
James Lawrence Orr (D-South Carolina) (starting December 7)

- Congress: 34th (until March 4), 35th (starting March 4)

==== State governments ====
Governors and lieutenant governors

=== Governors ===
- Governor of Alabama: John A. Winston (Democratic) (until December 1), Andrew B. Moore (Democratic) (starting December 1)
- Governor of Arkansas: Elias Nelson Conway (Democratic)
- Governor of California: J. Neely Johnson (Know Nothing)
- Governor of Connecticut: William T. Minor (Know Nothing) (until May 6), Alexander H. Holley (Republican) (starting May 6)
- Governor of Delaware: Peter F. Causey (Know Nothing)
- Governor of Florida: James E. Broome (Democratic) (until October 5), Madison S. Perry (Democratic) (starting October 5)
- Governor of Georgia: Herschel V. Johnson (Democratic) (until November 6), Joseph E. Brown (Democratic) (starting November 6)
- Governor of Illinois:Joel Aldrich Matteson (Democratic) (until January 12), William Henry Bissell (Republican) (starting January 12)
- Governor of Indiana: Joseph A. Wright (Democratic) (until January 12), Ashbel P. Willard (Democratic) (starting January 12)
- Governor of Iowa: James W. Grimes (Whig)
- Governor of Kentucky: Charles S. Morehead (Know Nothing)
- Governor of Louisiana: Robert C. Wickliffe (Democratic)
- Governor of Maine:
  - until January 8: Samuel Wells (Democratic)
  - January 8-February 25: Hannibal Hamlin (Republican)
  - starting February 25: Joseph H. Williams (Republican)
- Governor of Maryland: Thomas W. Ligon (Democratic)
- Governor of Massachusetts: Henry Gardner (Know Nothing)
- Governor of Michigan: Kinsley S. Bingham (Republican)
- Governor of Mississippi: John J. McRae (Democratic) (until November 16), William McWillie (Democratic) (starting November 16)
- Governor of Missouri:
  - until January 5: Sterling Price (Democratic)
  - January 5-February 27: Trusten Polk (Democratic)
  - February 27-October 22: Hancock Lee Jackson (Democratic)
  - starting October 22: Robert Marcellus Stewart (Democratic)
- Governor of New Hampshire: Ralph Metcalf (Know Nothing) (until June 4), William Haile (Republican) (starting June 4)
- Governor of New Jersey: Rodman M. Price (Democratic) (until January 20), William A. Newell (Republican) (starting January 20)
- Governor of New York: John Alsop King (Republican) (starting January 1)
- Governor of North Carolina: Thomas Bragg (Democratic)
- Governor of Ohio: Salmon P. Chase (Republican)
- Governor of Pennsylvania: James Pollock (Whig)
- Governor of Rhode Island: William W. Hoppin (Whig) (until May 26), Elisha Dyer (Republican) (starting May 26)
- Governor of South Carolina: Robert Francis Withers Allston (Democratic)
- Governor of Tennessee: Andrew Johnson (Democratic) (until November 3), Isham G. Harris (Democratic) (starting November 3)
- Governor of Texas: Elisha M. Pease (Democratic) (until December 21), Hardin R. Runnels (Democratic) (starting December 21)
- Governor of Vermont: Ryland Fletcher (Republican)
- Governor of Virginia: Henry A. Wise (Democratic)
- Governor of Wisconsin: Coles Bashford (Republican)

=== Lieutenant governors ===
- Lieutenant Governor of California: Robert M. Anderson (Know Nothing)
- Lieutenant Governor of Connecticut: Albert Day (Free Soil) (until May 6), Alfred A. Burnham (Republican) (starting May 6)
- Lieutenant Governor of Illinois: Gustavus Koerner (Democratic) (until January 12), John Wood (Republican) (starting January 12)
- Lieutenant Governor of Indiana: Ashbel P. Willard (Democratic) (until January 12), Abram A. Hammond (Democratic) (starting January 12)
- Lieutenant Governor of Kentucky: vacant
- Lieutenant Governor of Louisiana: William F. Griffin (Democratic)
- Lieutenant Governor of Massachusetts: Henry W. Benchley (political party unknown)
- Lieutenant Governor of Michigan: George Coe (Republican)
- Lieutenant Governor of Missouri:
  - until January 5: vacant
  - January 5-February 27: Hancock Lee Jackson (Democratic)
  - February 27-October 22: vacant
  - starting October 22: Hancock Lee Jackson (Democratic)
- Lieutenant Governor of New York: Henry R. Selden (Republican) (starting January 1)
- Lieutenant Governor of Ohio: Thomas H. Ford (Democratic)
- Lieutenant Governor of Rhode Island: Nicholas Brown III (political party unknown) (until May 26), Thomas G. Turner (political party unknown) (starting May 26)
- Lieutenant Governor of South Carolina: Gabriel Cannon (Democratic)
- Lieutenant Governor of Texas: Hardin Richard Runnels (Democratic) (until December 21), Francis R. Lubbock (Democratic) (starting December 21)
- Lieutenant Governor of Vermont: James M. Slade (Republican)
- Lieutenant Governor of Virginia: Elisha W. McComas (political party unknown) (until December 7), William Lowther Jackson (Democratic) (starting December 7)
- Lieutenant Governor of Wisconsin: Arthur MacArthur, Sr. (Democratic)

== Events ==
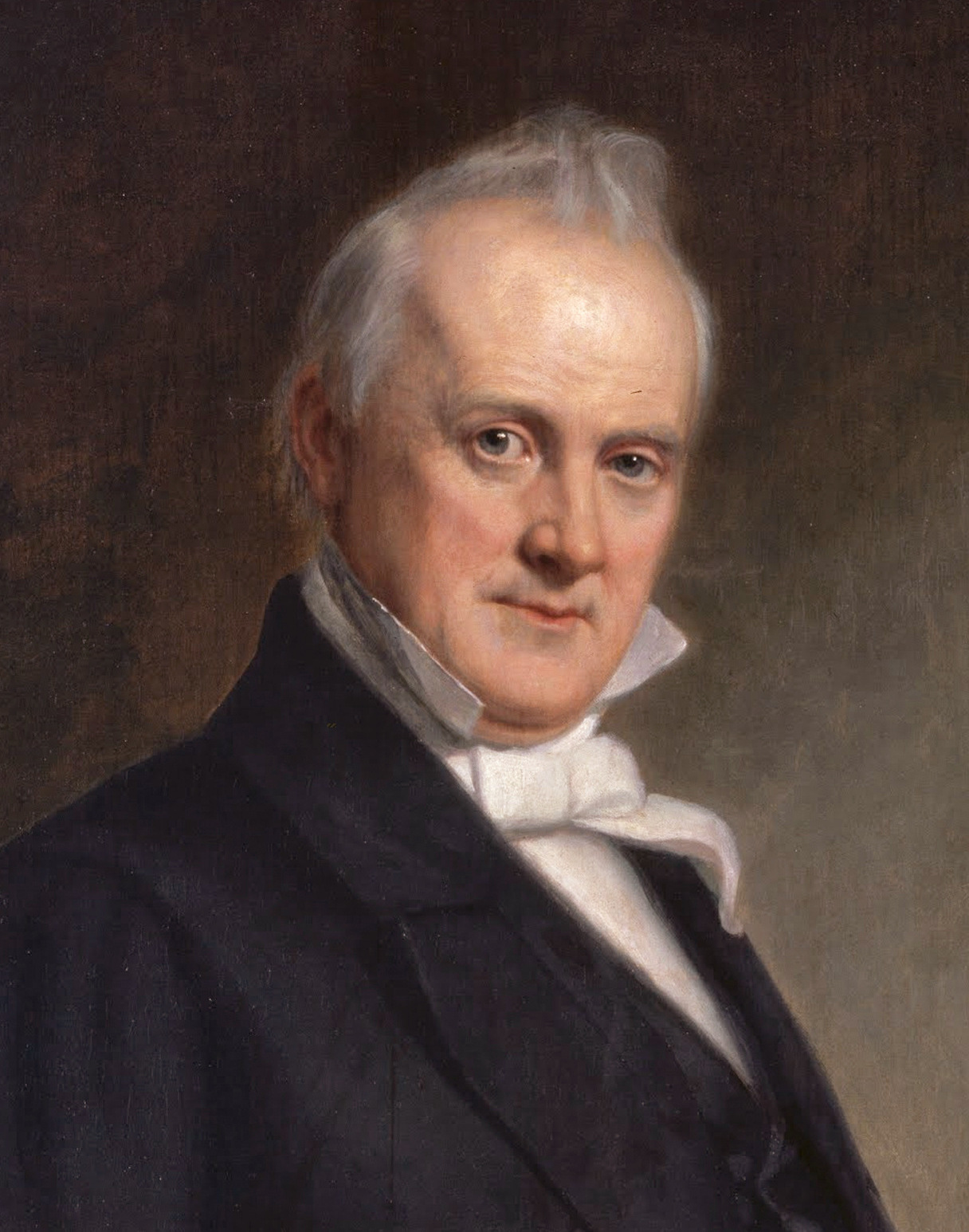
March 4: James Buchanan becomes the 15th U.S. president

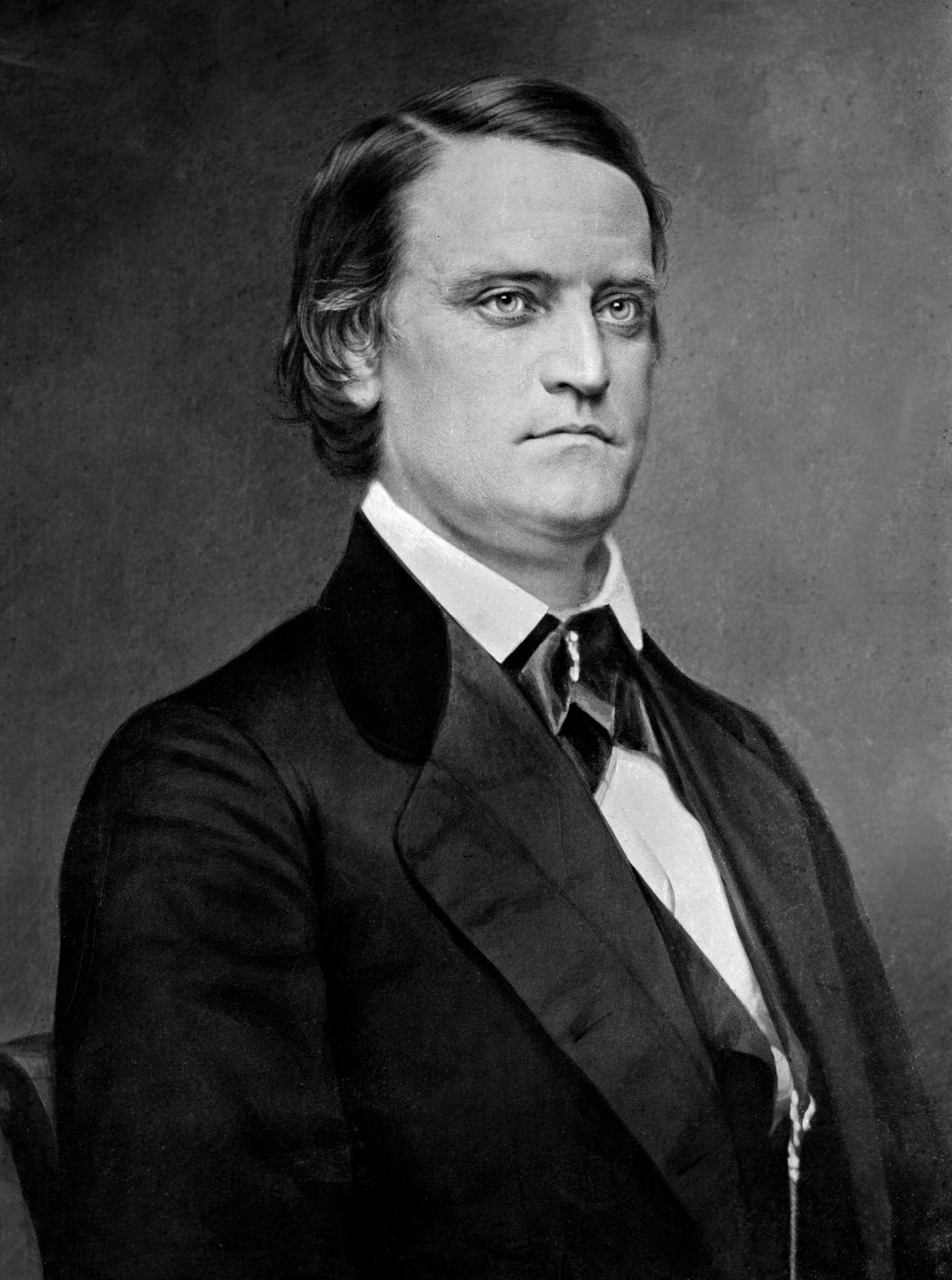
John C. Breckinridge becomes the 14th U.S. vice president

- January 9 – The 7.9 M_{w} Fort Tejon earthquake affects Central and Southern California with a maximum Mercalli intensity of IX (Violent).
- February 3 – The National Deaf Mute College (later renamed Gallaudet University) is established in Washington, D.C., becoming the first school for the advanced education of the deaf.
- March 4 – James Buchanan is sworn in as the 15th president of the United States, and John C. Breckinridge is sworn in as the 14th vice president.
- March 6 – Dred Scott v. Sanford: The Supreme Court of the United States rules that Blacks are not citizens and slaves cannot sue for freedom, driving the country further towards the American Civil War (the ruling is not overturned until the Fourteenth Amendment in 1868).
- March 12 – Elizabeth Blackwell opens a hospital, the New York Infirmary for Indigent Women and Children.
- May 25 – Flying Eagle cent released for circulation.
- May 24 – Slave trader Isaac Bolton shoots and kills slave trader James McMillin, beginning the long-running and violent Bolton–Dickins feud.
- May 26 – Dred Scott is emancipated by the Blow family, his original owners.
- July 18 – The Utah Expedition leaves Fort Leavenworth, effectively beginning the Utah War.
- August 24 – Ohio Life Insurance and Trust Company suspends payments, leading to the Panic of 1857.
- September 11 – Mountain Meadows massacre in Utah.
- September 12 – The SS Central America sinks off the coast of North Carolina, killing 425 people and sending large quantities of gold to the bottom.
- October 1 – Eviction of last residents of Seneca Village to make way for New York City's Central Park is completed.
- October 13 – Panic of 1857: New York banks close and do not reopen until December 12. This has an impact in Europe also.

=== Undated ===
- The seat of government of Iowa is moved from Iowa City to modern-day Des Moines.
- The Mormons abandon the Las Vegas Valley of Nevada.
- Maryland politician William Daniel proposes the Local Option for prohibition.

=== Ongoing ===
- Bleeding Kansas (1854–1860)
- Third Seminole War (1855–1858)
- Utah War (1857–1858)

== Births ==
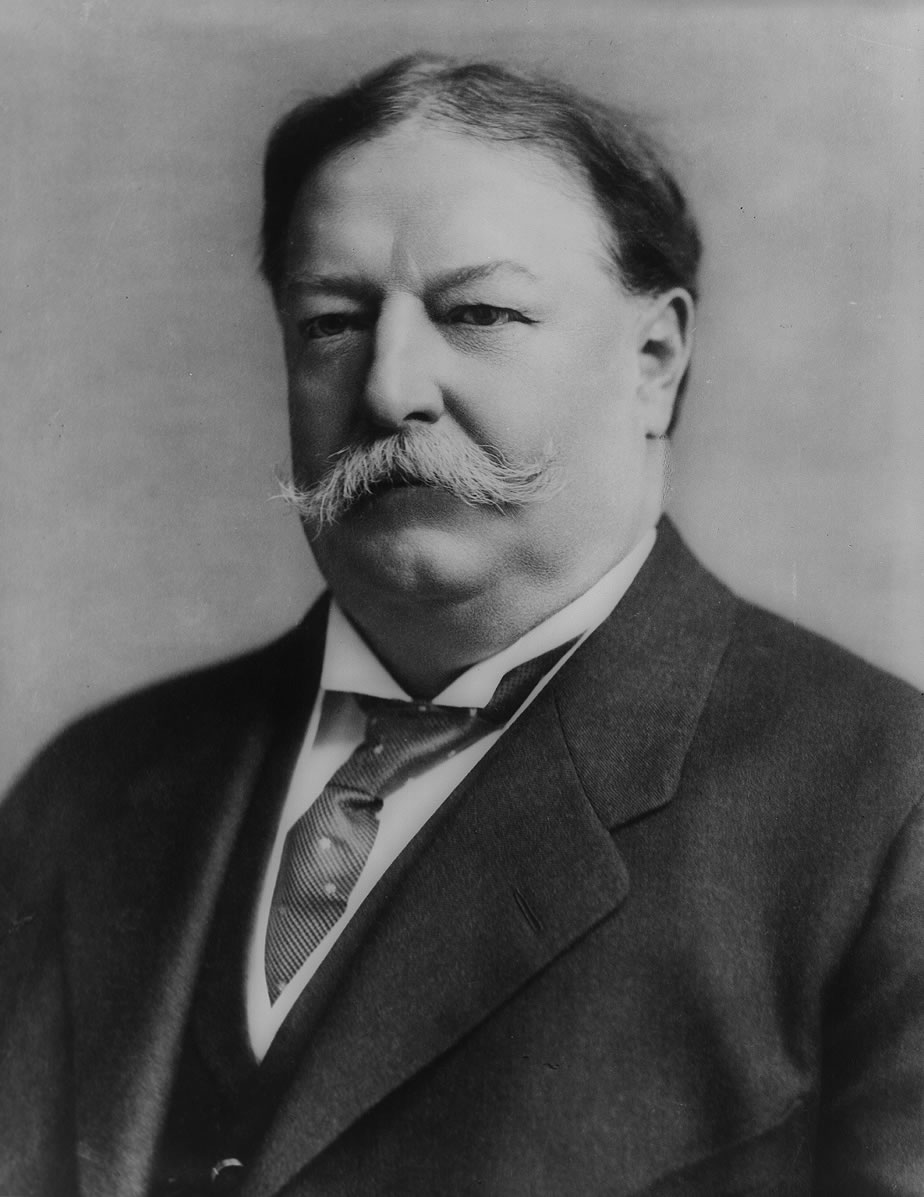
William Howard Taft

- January 6 – Milward Adams, orchestra and theatre manager born in Lexington, Kentucky.(died 1923)
- January 11 – William Gentles, U.S. Army private, known for killing Crazy Horse (died 1878)
- February 1 – Lucy Wheelock, early childhood education pioneer within the kindergarten movement (died 1946)
- February 7 – Benjamin Eli Smith, editor of reference books (died 1913)
- February 13 – Almanzo Wilder, writer (died 1949)
- March 6 – George Dayton, businessman, founder of Target Corporation (died 1938)
- March 7 – Genevieve Stebbins, performer of the Delsarte system of expression (died 1934)
- March 20 – Benjamin F. Shively, U.S. Senator from Indiana from 1909 to 1916 (died 1916)
- March 21
  - Charles Ellis Johnson, photographer (died 1926)
  - Hunter Liggett, general (died 1935)
- April 22 – Paul Dresser, songwriter (died 1906)
- May 17 – Mary Devens, pictorial photographer (died 1920)
- May 19 – John Jacob Abel, pharmacologist (died 1938)
- June 8 – Lawrence Marston, actor, playwright and film director (died 1939)
- June 10 – Caroline Louise Dudley (Mrs. Leslie Carter), stage actress (died 1937)
- June 20 – Mary Gage Day, physician (died 1935)
- July 1 – Martha Hughes Cannon, politician (died 1932)
- July 30
  - Lucy Bacon, California Impressionist painter (died 1932)
  - Thorstein Veblen, economist (died 1929)
- August 8 – Henry Fairfield Osborn, geologist, paleontologist and eugenist (died 1935)
- September 13 – Milton S. Hershey, chocolate manufacturer (died 1945)
- September 14 – Julia Platt, embryologist and politician (died 1935)
- September 15 – William Howard Taft, 27th president of the United States from 1909 to 1913 and tenth chief justice of the United States from 1921 to 1930 (died 1930)
- October 7 – George P. McLean, U.S. Senator from Connecticut from 1911 to 1923 (died 1932)
- October 17 – Mary Abbott, golfer (died 1904)
- October 24 – Ned Williamson, baseball player (died 1894)
- November 5 – Ida Tarbell, investigative journalist (died 1944)
- December 1 – Samuel M. Ralston, U.S. Senator from Indiana from 1923 to 1925 (died 1925)
- December 2
  - J. Frank Allee, U.S. Senator from Delaware from 1903 to 1907 (died 1938)
  - Charles E. Rushmore, businessman, attorney, namesake of Mount Rushmore (died 1931)
- December 4 – Julia Evelyn Ditto Young, poet and novelist (died 1915)

== Deaths ==
- February 16 – Elisha Kane, Arctic explorer (born 1820)
- April 7 – Henry A. Crabb executed by firing squad in Sonora after a failed filibuster (born 1820s Tennessee)
- May 1 – Stephen Adams, U.S. Senator from Mississippi from 1852 to 1857 (born 1807)
- May 26 – James Bell, U.S. Senator from New Hampshire from 1855 to 1857 (born 1804)
- June 19 – Alexander Twilight, educator and minister, first African-American known to have earned a bachelor's degree from an American college or university (Middlebury College, 1823) (born 1795)
- July 4 – William L. Marcy, 21st Secretary of State from 1853 to 1857 (born 1786)
- August 29 – Stephen Cassin, United States Navy officer (born 1783)
- September 15 – John Henderson, U.S. Senator from Mississippi from 1839 to 1845 (born 1797)
- October 7 – Louis McLane, U.S. Senator from Delaware from 1827 to 1829 (born 1786)
- October 10 – Thomas Crawford, sculptor (born 1814)
- October 20 – John Diamond, minstrel dancer (born 1823)
- October 27 – John Blennerhassett Martin, painter, engraver and lithographer (born 1797)
- December 24 – Robert C. Nicholas, U.S. Senator from Louisiana from 1836 to 1841 (born 1793)
- Jasper Grosvenor, financier (born 1794)
- Aspasia Cruvellier Mirault, planter and landowner (born 1800)

== See also ==
- Timeline of United States history (1820–1859)
