= James McMillin (slave trader) =

American slave trader (1806–1857)

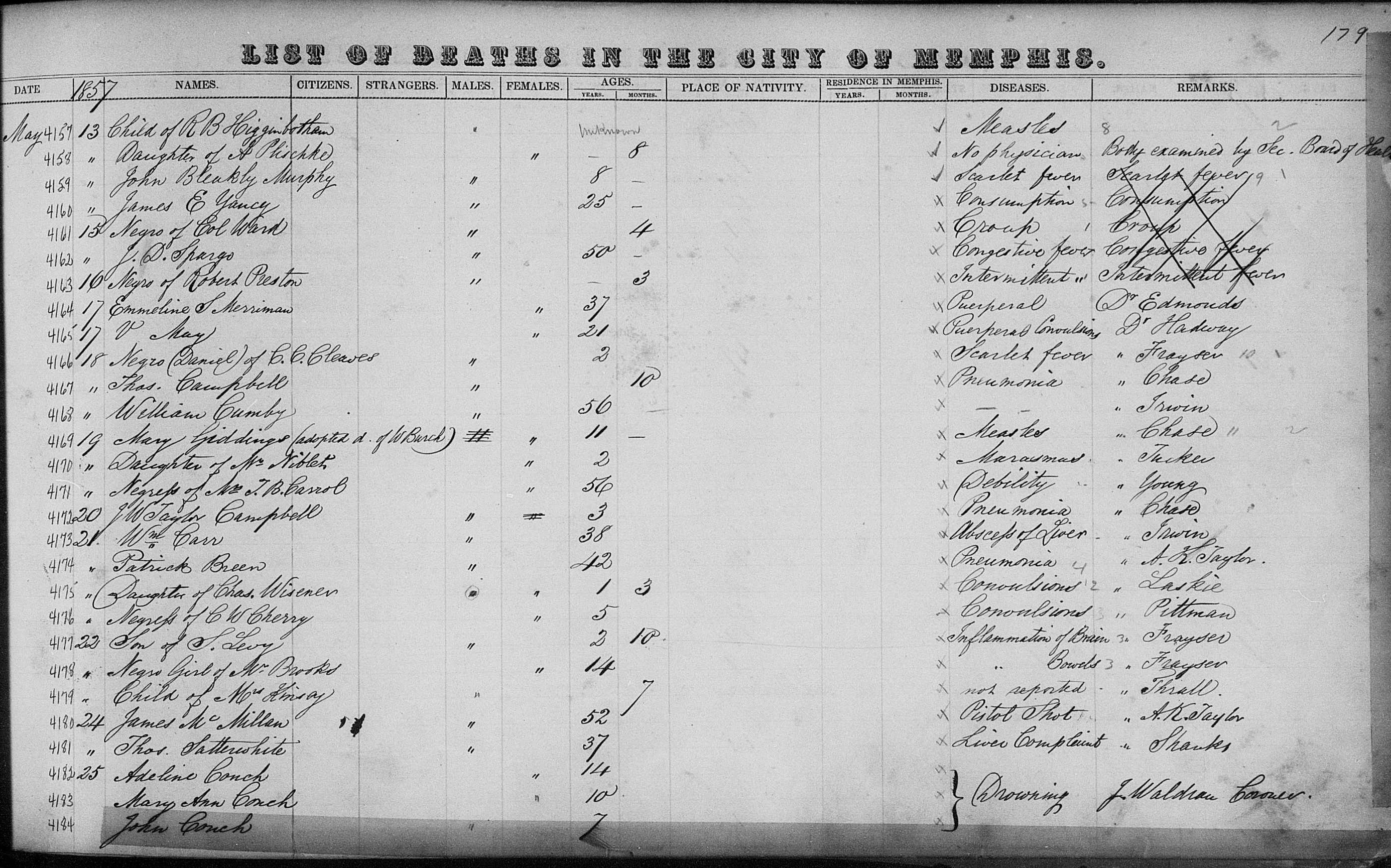
- Deaths in Memphis, May 1857
- Born: July 26, 1806; Kentucky, U.S.
- Died: May 24, 1857 (aged 50); Memphis, Tennessee, U.S.
- Cause of death: Gunshot wounds
- Other names: Jim McMillin, McMillan, McMillen
- Occupations: Slave jailor, slave trader, tavern keeper

James McMillin (July 26, 1806 – May 24, 1857) was an American tavern keeper and slave trader of Kentucky. He was implicated in more than one case of attempted kidnapping into slavery (the abduction of a free family of color with intent to sell them as chattel in a slave state).

In 1857, Memphis slave trader Isaac Bolton shot McMillin several times over an unprofitable trade. McMillin died hours later in the home of Memphis slave trader Nathan Bedford Forrest. His last name is very often spelled McMillan or McMillen; this article uses the spelling that appears on his grave marker and hometown newspaper.

McMillin's murder would mark the beginning the Bolton–Dickins feud, a gangland war between associates of Bolton, Dickens & Co., one of the largest professional slave trading businesses in the country. Between seven and 19 people were ultimately killed as a result of the war.

== Life and work ==
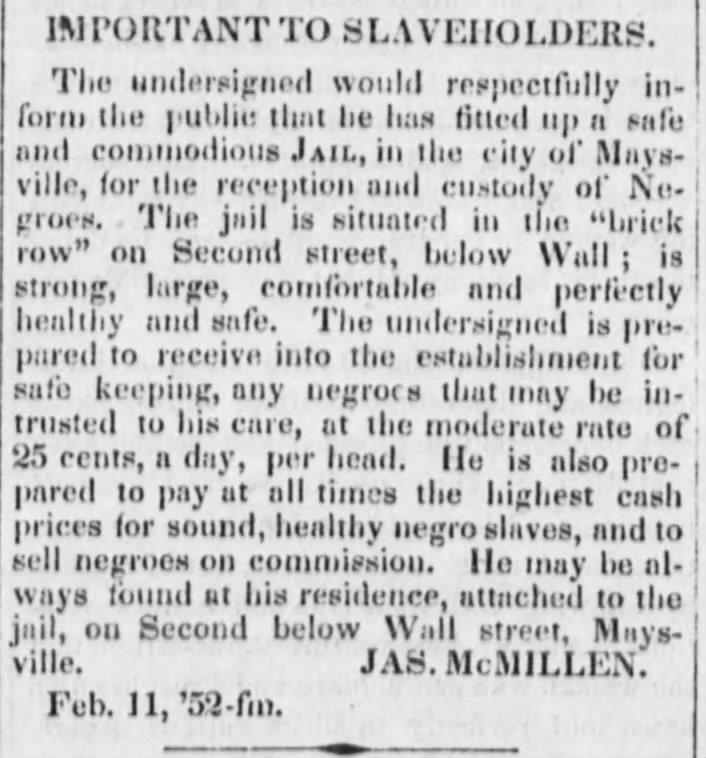
"Important to Slave-Holders" Anti-Slavery Bugle, June 12, 1852

McMillin was a resident of Maysville, Kentucky. His name is often recorded as James McMillan or James McMillen. In 1903, his hometown newspaper summarized his biography thusly: "Jim McMillin, as he was familiarly known, was, in the parlance of that period, a 'Nigger Trader.' At the time of which we write, he lived in a house in the 'brick row' in West Second street, using the cellar for a 'pen,' the windows and doors being secured by iron bars, bolts and locks." His widow once testified that McMillin "kept his slaves in the basement of his kitchen."

It is unclear exactly when McMillin's slave trading career began but that his home base was Maysville may be significant. For one thing, "The Kentucky road from Maysville to Nashville made up the northern link of the old Natchez Trace, the road which was followed into Mississippi," and from there, drovers of cattle and chattel made their way south to sell their stock in Mississippi and Alabama. For another, Maysville was home to a notorious nest of kidnappers who regularly stole the lives of free people of color: "This gang was located in Maysville because of its proximity to the Ohio shore. These kidnappers had connections with the slave traders in the central part of the state, and no purchaser questioned where the slaves were secured." In any case, McMillin worked with a number of interstate slave traders—including Lewis Robards as early as 1850, Bedford Forrest beginning in 1853, and Bolton, Dickens & Co., circa 1855 to 1857—as an agent who visited plantations and small towns buying slaves for resale in larger, more profitable markets. Forrest and McMillin had a profit-sharing agreement in which McMillin received 25 percent of revenue above expenses on enslaved people that were purchased for resale at Forrest's negro marts in Memphis, Tennessee, and Vicksburg, Mississippi.

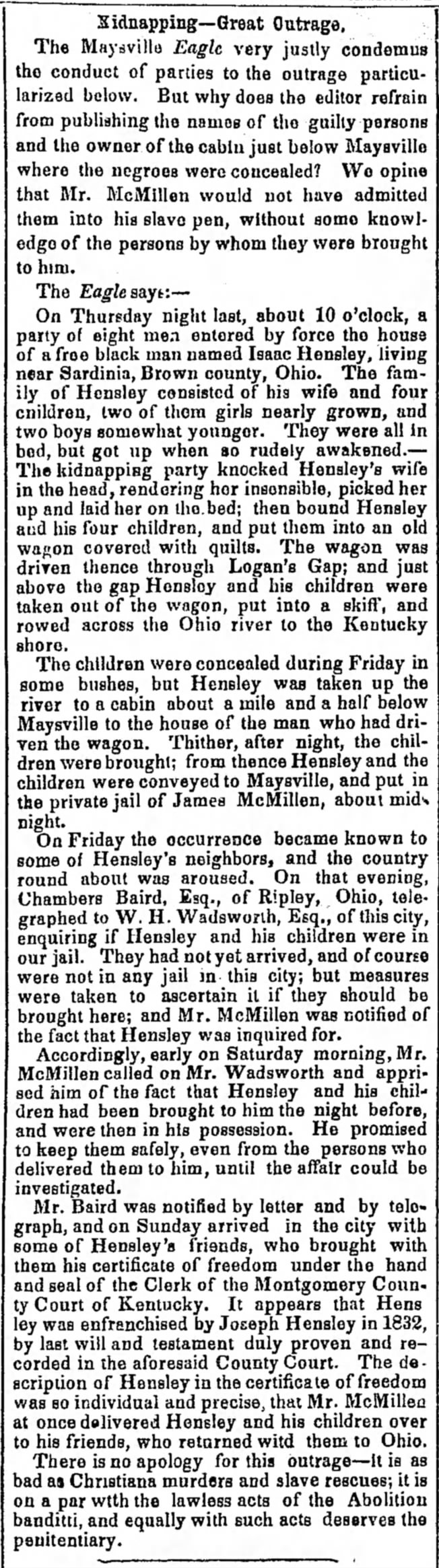
"Kidnapping—Great Outrage" The Louisville Daily Courier, September 22, 1853

In 1850, notorious Lexington, Kentucky, trader Lewis Robards paid McMillin US$600 (equivalent to $23,220 in 2025) to kidnap a legally free woman named Arian Belle, and her four-year-old child Martha, from Mason County, Kentucky, in the middle of the night. As Arian and Martha were being shipped down the river on the steamship Sea Gull, her friends discovered what had happened to her and sued for her return. In 1853, a man named Isaac Hensley, of Sardinia, Ohio, and his four children were taken from their beds in the middle of the night, tied up, rowed south across the Ohio River to Kentucky in a skiff, and deposited in James McMillin's private slave jail. According to the Maysville Eagle by way of the Louisville Daily Courier:

McMillen was notified of the fact that Hensley was inquired for. Accordingly, early on Saturday morning, Mr. McMillen called on Mr. Wadsworth and apprised him of the fact that Hensley and his children had been brought to him the night before, and were then in his possession. He promised to keep them safely, even from the persons who delivered them to him, until the affair could be investigated. Mr. Baird was notified by letter and by telegraph, and on Sunday arrived in the city with some of Hensley's friends, who brought with them his certificate of freedom under the hand and seal of the Clerk of the Montgomery County Court of Kentucky. It appears that Hensley was enfranchised by Joseph Hensley in 1832, by last will and testament duly proven and recorded in the aforesaid County Court. The description of Hensley in the certificate of freedom was so individual and precise, that Mr. McMillen at once delivered Hensley and his children over to his friends, who returned with them to Ohio.

Around 1855, Robards lost his slave jail when investor John H. Morgan, later of the Confederate States Army, sued over an unpaid financial obligation. The premises were purchased by Bolton, Dickens & Co., whose local representative was one of the principals of the firm, Washington Bolton. According to J. Winston Coleman's Slavery Times in Kentucky, in July 1855, Bolton sent McMillin US$11,460 (equivalent to $395,984 in 2025) to "lay out in Negroes." According to records from a lawsuit, in autumn 1855 Wash Bolton wrote James McMillin that he was trying to fill out a shipping lot to send south for the already-underway selling season: "We must have negroes if possible. Can't you buy the man and wife in jail? Buy every good negro you can and have them here by Friday. If you believe we can make $150 a head profit on the Peed negroes, buy them; if not, let them runaway, but don't let any of your negroes get away."

In 1856 a woman named Ann Goddard sued over being wrongfully imprisoned in McMillin's slave jail. According to the Louisville Daily Courier, "She brought suit for her freedom, alleging that she had been forcibly arrested by the officers and lodged in the negro jail of the late James McMillan, under the claim of the defendant, Mary Goddard, that she was her slave, when in truth she was a free white woman...An attempt was then made by the defendant to prove her the daughter of a mulatto named Matilda, by whom the plaintiff had been reared from infancy, but in this they did not succeed, as no witness was introduced who was present at the birth of the child."

At some point before his murder, McMillin sold a young person named John Burnett, who later, under his current name of John Cook, placed a family reunification ad in the newspaper in 1886, hoping to find his lost mother and sister, or perhaps his mother's other sons:

DEAR EDITOR ---- I was born ten miles northeast of Mayville, Ky., on Mrs. Margaret Cook's plantation. My mother's name was Pennela[?]in White. She had three sons who went to St. Louis, John, Alvin, Aaron, Charlie, Oliver and James Henson. They went to St. Louis with Henry Duval. At that time I was going by the name of John Burnett. I was sold to a speculator by the name of James McMullen, and I was brought South by the same man. I had a sister by the name of Elizabeth, who married a man by the name of Henry Gine. Any one that can inform me of the above relatives will please address the Rev. A. D. Green or the writer. JNO. COOK. Kosciusko, Miss.

== Death ==
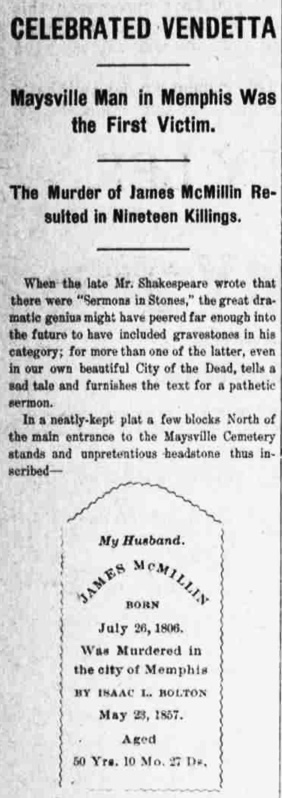
"Celebrated Vendetta" Maysville Daily Public Ledger, March 23, 1903

The deal that resulted in James McMillin's murder was supposedly done in December 1856. In Slave-Trading in the Old South, Frederic Bancroft described the circumstances of McMillin's death, writing that he was "a well-known trader, who for years had ranged over Kentucky searching for slaves for Lexington and Memphis dealers. The apprentice was promptly sent to Memphis and sold as a slave. This was a crime against the apprentice and a fraud on the purchaser. By some rare, good fortune the negro obtained the aid of a lawyer of integrity and by suit recovered his freedom; and the Boltons were compelled to refund the money they had received for him." An 1898 retelling of the Bolton-Dickens feud described the young man who was sold as being about 23 years old (thus born about 1833) and "possessed of some education and considerable common sense".

An 1875 Memphis Avalanche newspaper account of the Bolton–Dickins family feud provides additional detail:

Over 20 years ago a colored lad was purchased somewhere in Kentucky at a public sale who had been manumitted by a will of his master and who was to be set free after he arrived at a certain age. The conditions of the sale were named and Bolton & Dickens' agent, one McMillan became the purchaser. He was conveyed to their mart in this city and the firm subsequently sold the boy for the sum of $1800 to Thomas B. Crenshaw near Morning Sun in this county. (Note: Thomas C. Crenshaw owned a plantation in Shelby County. The two-story house, called Mount Airy, was built in 1835.) The boy was considered valuable and brought a big price for those times but he was sold as a slave for life nothing being said about his promised freedom. The colored boy informed his new master of the actual situation. Crenshaw sent to Kentucky for a copy of the will, employed counsel for the boy, and the courts decided against the slave traders. They were forced to return their ill gotten dollars to Crenshaw and also pay heavy costs for their misdemeanor. They had expected McMillan to testify in their favor. He failed to do so and stuck to the truth throughout. The dealers managed to obtain a new trial and having been deceived into the belief that McMillan would swear as they wished to prevent his reappearance.

An 1870 Memphis Avalanche article claimed the enslaved man was to be freed under the terms of a Kentucky owner's will if he was ever taken out of state. The 1898 Memphis Commercial Appeal retelling claims the buyer was not Thomas Crenshaw of Morning Sun but Rev. D. K. Crenshaw of Bond Station, Shelby County. McMillin claimed that Lexington-based Wash Bolton (who ran the firm's office and jail there) knew all about the legal circumstances of the laborer, and had determined that they should take the risk. Apparently after the legal proceedings found against Bolton, Dickens & Co., the 23-year-old was sent back home to Kentucky.

In any case, Isaac Bolton was enraged and after enticing McMillin to Memphis with a business proposal, Isaac Bolton called McMillin a rascal and shot him at least three times. According to another account: "On the morning of the 23d Isaac Bolton was alone in the Howard Row slave market. He was under the influence of liquor and was in an ugly mood. McMillan entered. No one ever knew exactly what occurred. There were loud words. McMillan was seen to run across the open court and Isaac Bolton raised a shotgun to his shoulder and emptied two loads of buckshot into McMillan’s back." McMillin died shortly thereafter from his wounds.

== Aftermath ==
McMillin's heirs successfully petitioned to have the trial moved out of Shelby County. A clergyman testified at the Bolton trial that although he was a slave trader and a tavern owner, McMillin was considered to be respectable and of good character. Two businessmen from Memphis testified as to McMillin's "character for peace and good citizenship, for he was the most amiable of men." Bolton was acquitted. Bolton's legal fees (and alleged bribe money for sheriff, judge, and jurors) cost a fortune, which in turn triggered a violent conflict over the expense between Bolton and his erstwhile business partner Thomas Dickins, which continued, with many casualties, until 1874.

McMillin was 52 years old when he was killed. His body was moved from Memphis to Maysville by the steamship Northerner. McMillin was buried in Maysville Cemetery. His headstone reads, My Husband James McMillin, b. July 26, 1806, was murdered In the City of Memphis by Isaac L. Bolton, May 23, 1857, age 50 years.

== See also ==
- List of American slave traders
- History of slavery in Kentucky
- Bolton–Dickins feud
- Bibliography of the slave trade in the United States

== Sources ==
- Clark, T. D. (December 1934). "The Slave Trade between Kentucky and the Cotton Kingdom". The Mississippi Valley Historical Review. 21 (3). Urbana, Illinois: Mississippi Valley Historical Association: 331–342. doi:10.2307/1897378. ISSN 0161-391X. JSTOR 1897378. OCLC 35781793.
- Parr, Elizabeth L. (January 1928). "Kentucky's Overland Trade with the Ante-Bellum South" (PDF). Filson Club Quarterly. II. Digitization sponsored by Joan & Burlyn Pike. Louisville, Kentucky: Filson Historical Society: 71–81. ISSN 0015-1874. OCLC 6674913.
