= Bolton–Dickins feud =

West Tennessee, U.S., violent conflict between former slave traders

Bolton–Dickens feud
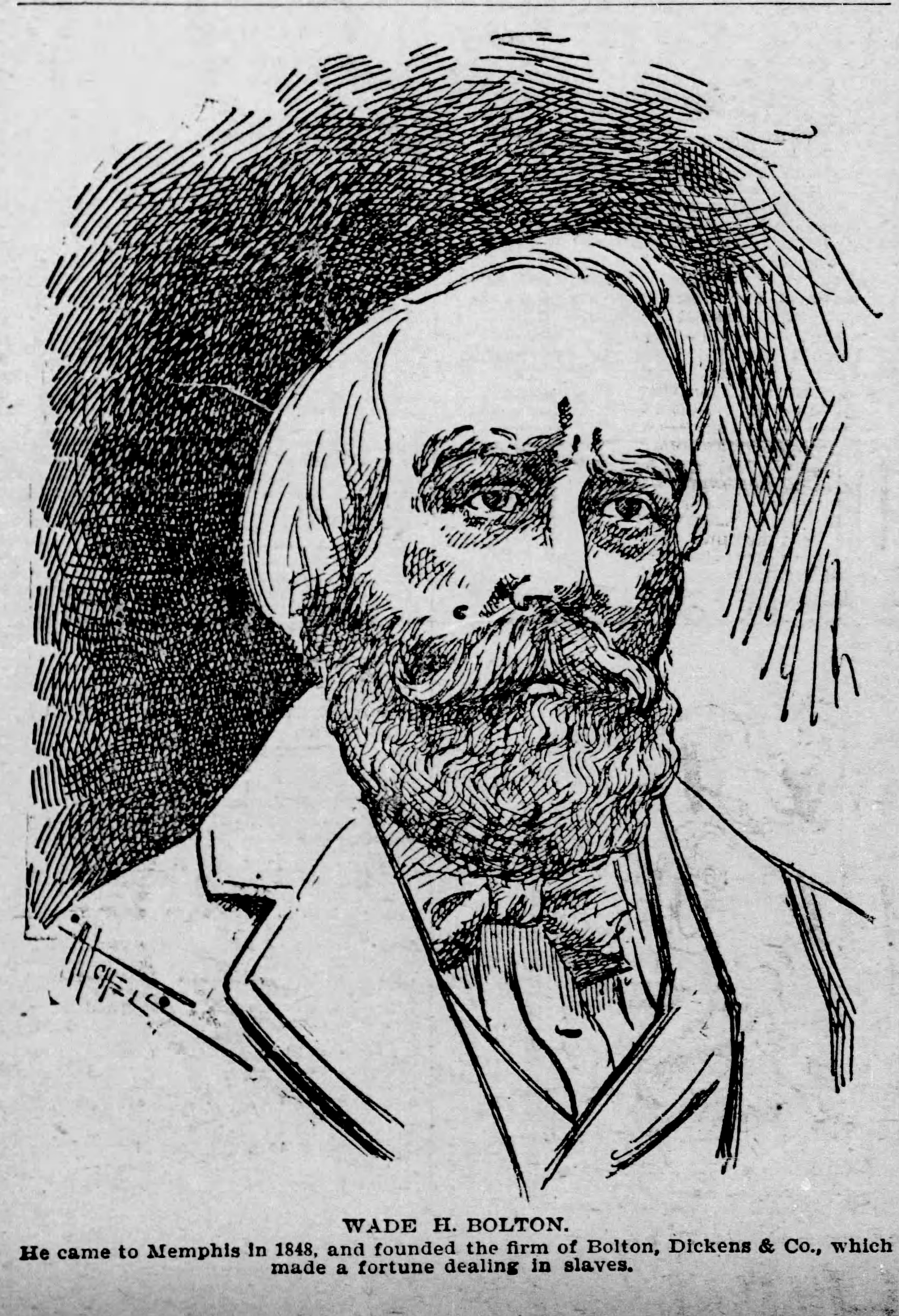
- Portrait of Wade H. Bolton published in the Memphis Commercial Appeal, 1898
- Date: 1856–1870
- Caused by: Money problems for Bolton, Dickens & Co. principals consequent to Isaac Bolton's murder of fellow slave trader James McMillin
- Status: Concluded

Parties
Isaac Bolton; Wade Bolton; Elijah C. Patterson	Thomas Dickins; Samuel Dickins; John C. Bolton

Casualties and losses
Wade H. Bolton; "two ex-slaves"; James Inman; Morgan; Henderson Inman (injured)	Greene Wilson; Nancy Dickens; Thomas Dickins; Samuel Dickins (ambiguous)
- At least one account suggests there were multiple "ex-slave" casualties not recorded in the histories; the two families intermarried more than once, see Bolton, Dickens & Co. § Family feud for a brief summary of the relationships

The Bolton–Dickens feud was a bloody intrafamily conflict in Tennessee in the United States from 1856 to 1870. The principals were former business partners in the extensive multi-state slave trading firm, Bolton, Dickens & Co. (Note: The firm was primarily advertised as Bolton & Dickens (but occasionally as Bolten & Dickins); people seemed to use both Dickens, like the writer, and Dickins, with two Is, when referring to members of the family.) In what amounted to a West Tennessee gangland war, between seven and 19 people were ultimately killed, including at least two (and possibly several) unidentified former slaves. The conflict began when Isaac Bolton killed another slave trader over a business deal gone bad. When the cost of getting him acquitted was put into the Bolton & Dickens business accounts, Thomas Dickins protested fiercely and the firm was ultimately dissolved. Following the American Civil War, as various parties requested in court that firm's accounts be settled and remaining funds distributed, tensions rose again. There was a raid on Thom Dickins' house in which two of his servants were killed. Then Thom Dickins walked up to Wade H. Bolton in broad daylight and shot him. Dickins was acquitted at trial, but was himself shot and killed a year later by persons unknown. Dickins' son died shortly thereafter under unclear circumstances, effectively concluding the violence.

== Inciting event ==
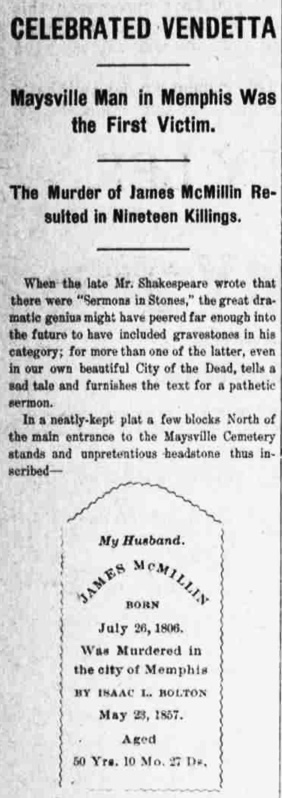
"Celebrated Vendetta" Maysville Daily Public Ledger, March 23, 1903

The deal that resulted in James McMillin's murder was supposedly done in December 1856. In Slave-Trading in the Old South, Frederic Bancroft described the circumstances of McMillin's death, writing that he was "a well-known trader, who for years had ranged over Kentucky searching for slaves for Lexington and Memphis dealers. The apprentice was promptly sent to Memphis and sold as a slave. This was a crime against the apprentice and a fraud on the purchaser. By some rare, good fortune the negro obtained the aid of a lawyer of integrity and by suit recovered his freedom; and the Boltons were compelled to refund the money they had received for him." An 1898 retelling of the Bolton-Dickens feud described the young man who was sold as being about 23 years old (thus born about 1833) and "possessed of some education and considerable common sense".

An 1875 Memphis Avalanche newspaper account of the Bolton–Dickins family feud provides additional detail:

Over 20 years ago a colored lad was purchased somewhere in Kentucky at a public sale who had been manumitted by a will of his master and who was to be set free after he arrived at a certain age. The conditions of the sale were named and Bolton & Dickens' agent, one McMillan became the purchaser. He was conveyed to their mart in this city and the firm subsequently sold the boy for the sum of $1800 to Thomas B. Crenshaw near Morning Sun in this county. (Note: Thomas C. Crenshaw owned a plantation in Shelby County. The two-story house, called Mount Airy, was built in 1835.) The boy was considered valuable and brought a big price for those times but he was sold as a slave for life nothing being said about his promised freedom. The colored boy informed his new master of the actual situation. Crenshaw sent to Kentucky for a copy of the will, employed counsel for the boy, and the courts decided against the slave traders. They were forced to return their ill gotten dollars to Crenshaw and also pay heavy costs for their misdemeanor. They had expected McMillan to testify in their favor. He failed to do so and stuck to the truth throughout. The dealers managed to obtain a new trial and having been deceived into the belief that McMillan would swear as they wished to prevent his reappearance.

An 1870 Memphis Avalanche article claimed the enslaved man was to be freed under the terms of a Kentucky owner's will if he was ever taken out of state. The 1898 Memphis Commercial Appeal retelling claims the buyer was not Thomas Crenshaw of Morning Sun but Rev. D. K. Crenshaw of Bond Station, Shelby County. McMillin claimed that Lexington-based Wash Bolton (who ran the firm's office and jail there) knew all about the legal circumstances of the laborer, and had determined that they should take the risk. Apparently after the legal proceedings found against Bolton, Dickens & Co., the 23-year-old was sent back home to Kentucky.

In any case, Isaac Bolton was enraged and after enticing McMillin to Memphis with a business proposal, Isaac Bolton called McMillin a rascal and shot him at least three times. According to another account: "On the morning of the 23d Isaac Bolton was alone in the Howard Row slave market. He was under the influence of liquor and was in an ugly mood. McMillan entered. No one ever knew exactly what occurred. There were loud words. McMillan was seen to run across the open court and Isaac Bolton raised a shotgun to his shoulder and emptied two loads of buckshot into McMillan’s back." McMillin died shortly thereafter from his wounds.

== Conflict ==
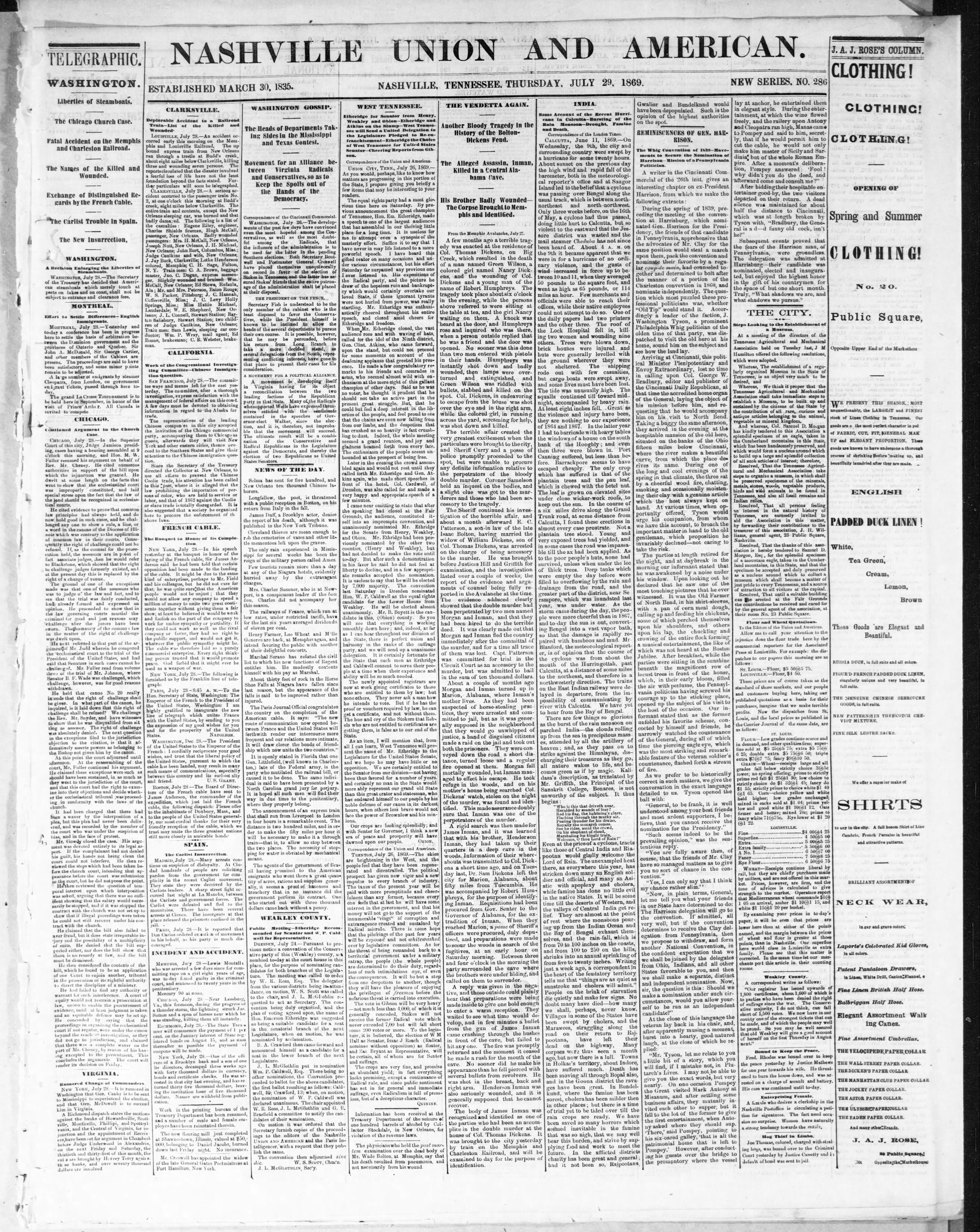
Column five of Nashville Union and American for July 29, 1869 recounts recent events in the bloody feud

Bolton was ultimately acquitted of the crime (reportedly in part thanks to bribing jurors), and then paid his legal expenses out of the business, which was not good for the profits of his partners, and that kicked off the feud, as Tom Dickins felt he was suffering unfairly for Bolton's legal troubles. The defense of Bolton reportedly cost between US$100,000 (equivalent to $3,721,154 in 2025) and US$300,000 (equivalent to $11,163,462 in 2025). There were plans to resolve matters by shotgun duel but then the American Civil War broke out and such matters were tabled for the duration.

Sometime between the dissolution of the firm (c. 1857) and the end of the American Civil War, Isaac Bolton and Washington Bolton died of unremarkable causes. The widow of Washington Bolton sought to have the finances of the firm sorted out so that she could be paid her share of the value. This stoked the smoldering resentments of Dickins against Wade H. Bolton. In 1867, "two ex-slaves" who had once been the legal property of Wade H. Bolton were murdered, and their dead bodies were left to be found "by the roadside" in order to send a message from Dickins to Bolton. In approximately 1868, a man named James "Green" Wilson and female servant, Nancy Dickens, were shot and killed during a nighttime raid on Thom Dickins' house. Thom Dickins and Robert Humphreys survived the attack on the house.

Wade H. Bolton and E.C. Patterson (a son-in-law of Isaac Bolton and supposedly a cousin to U.S. Representative Thomas Patterson) were charged with shooting and killing Nancy through the window. In 1869, two men, Inman and Morgan, believed to be involved in the murders of Nancy Dickins and James Wilson "were tracked into a cave in North Alabama and killed."

On July 14, 1869, Tom Dickins shot Wade H. Bolton in downtown Memphis. Bolton died a week later from his injuries. On July 30, 1870, Tom Dickins was killed in the Hatchie bottom, a short distance from Memphis. He was killed with two shotgun blasts heard from a distance; his horse returned to the stable covered in blood. Dickins' killer was never identified. Two weeks later Dickins' son Samuel Dickins was bushwhacked and killed at the same place. According to a different account, Samuel Dickins was not murdered, but on October 11, 1870, committed suicide by shotgun on the site of his father's murder.

== Feud-associated casualties ==
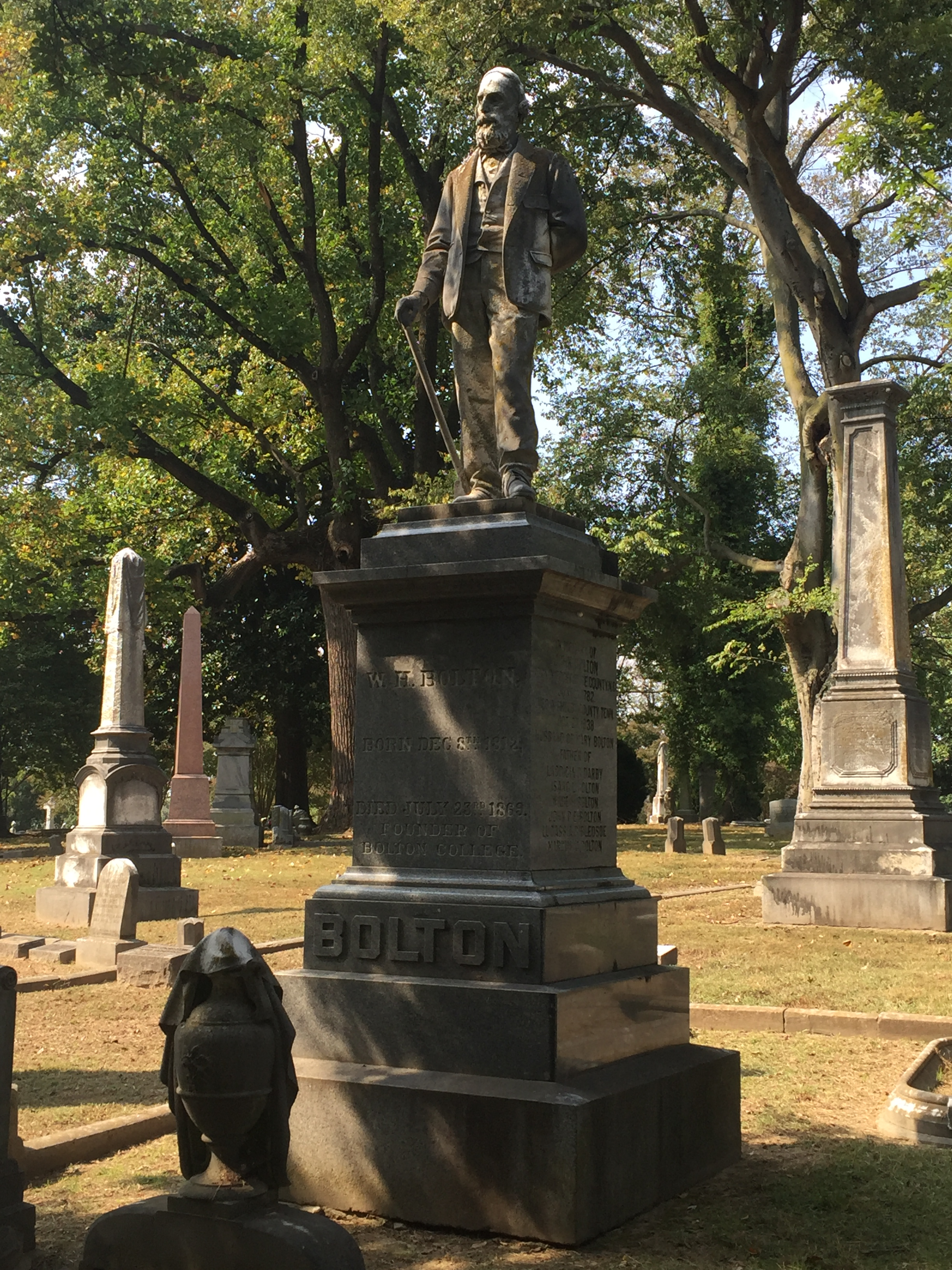
Wade H. Bolton monument at Elmwood Cemetery in Memphis

1. James McMillin
2. Wade H. Bolton, shot by Tom Dickins with an "ivory-mounted repeater" in Court Square, died several days later July 23, 1869
3. Thomas Dickins, killed by shotgun blast by unidentified assassin
4. Nancy Dickens was killed spring 1869, during a home invasion at Dickens' house, 12 miles north of Memphis. She was described as a "trusted family servant of Dickens' for fifteen years" and "an octaroon, who was housekeeper and cook for Col. Dickens." Reportedly, "the colored girl in running across the yard, screaming for help, was shot down and killed." Per the coroner at trial, the dead bodies were half a mile from the house shot and stabbed to death "wounds so numerous I cannot describe them."
5. James or Green or Greene Wilson, killed at Big Creek same time as Nancy Dickens, was shot and stabbed multiple times.
6. Morgan
7. James Inman (his brother Henderson Inman was injured and taken prisoner at the same time) was killed outside a cavern near Russellville, Alabama.

== See also ==
- History of slavery in Tennessee
- History of Memphis, Tennessee
- Bolton High School (Tennessee) § History
