= Barbara Rowan =

Barbara Rowan may refer to:

- Barbara Rowan, pseudonym used by Ida Pollock (1908–2013), British writer
- Barbara Ann Rowan (1938–2020), American attorney
