= Lewis C. Robards =

19th-century American slave trader

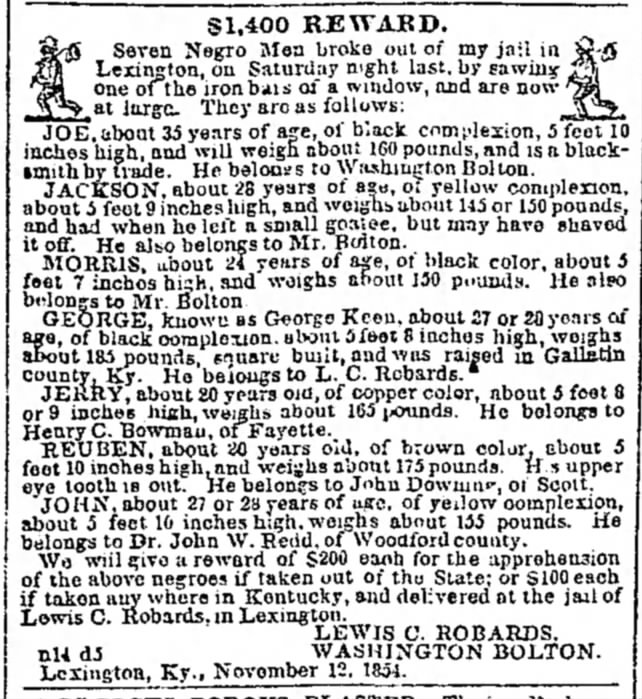
- L. C. Robards and Washington Bolton offered a reward of US$1,400 (equivalent to $48,995 in 2024) reward for the recapture of George Keen, Jackson, Jerry, Joe (a blacksmith), John, Morris, and Reuben (The Louisville Daily Courier, November 17, 1854)
- Born: c. 1817; Kentucky?
- Died: Kentucky?
- Other names: L. C. Robards, Louis C. Robards

Lewis C. Robards (fl. 1848–1855) was a 19th-century American slave trader of Lexington, Kentucky. He had an unscrupulous reputation as a dealer, and he was widely known for his "special" offerings: fancy girls, meaning young, light-skinned enslaved women and girls offered for sexual exploitation. Robards was also considered a likely culprit in several cases of kidnapping into slavery. His slave pen was funded in part by a loan from John Hunt Morgan; when he could not repay the loan his premises were sold to Bolton, Dickens & Co., a multi-state slave-trading firm based in West Tennessee.

== Life and work ==
According to a family history published in 1910, Lewis (or Louis) Robards was the oldest surviving child of Nancy Merriman and George Lewis Robards (b. 1795). George L. Robards was veteran of the war of 1812, who received, at the Battle of New Orleans, "a severe wound by having a bayonet run through his right leg, and afterward he walked to his home in Bullitt County, Kentucky." George L. Robards was the son of Lewis Robards and his second wife, Hannah Winn. Lewis Robards' first wife was Rachel Donelson. Rachel Donelson's second husband was Andrew Jackson, who was elected U.S. president in 1828.

Robards, in partnership with his brother Alfred O. Robards, may have started as a field agent for, first, Lexington slave trader Joseph H. Northcutt, and, second, Lexington slave trader R. W. Lucas. Robards eventually opened his own slave prison and trading operation, located on Short Street, in sight of the home of Abraham Lincoln's brother-in-law, Levi Todd. In 1850, Robards paid James McMillin US$600 (equivalent to $22,678 in 2024) to kidnap a legally free woman named Arian Belle, and her four-year-old child Martha, from Mason County, Kentucky, in the middle of the night. As Arian and Martha were being shipped down the river on the steamship Sea Gull, her friends discovered what had happened to her and sued for her return.

Future U.S. Senator and U.S. Secretary of the Interior Orville H. Browning wrote in his diary about a visit to Robards' "establishment" in 1854:

After dinner visited a negro jail—a very large brick building with all the conveniences of comfortable life, including hospital. Tis a place where negroes are kept for sale - Outer doors & windows all protected with iron grates, but inside the appointments are not only comfortable, but in many respects luxurious. Many of the rooms are well carpeted & furnished, & very neat, and the inmates whilst here are treated with great indulgence & humanity, but I confess it impressed me with the idea of decorating the ox for the sacrifice. In several of the rooms I found very handsome mulatto women, of fine persons and easy genteel manners, sitting at their needle work awaiting a purchaser. The proprietor made them get up & turn round to show to advantage their finely developed & graceful forms—and slaves as they were this I confess rather shocked my gallantry. I enquired the price of one girl which was $1,600 (Note: $1,600 in 1854 is equivalent to US$1,600 (equivalent to $55,994 in 2024).)

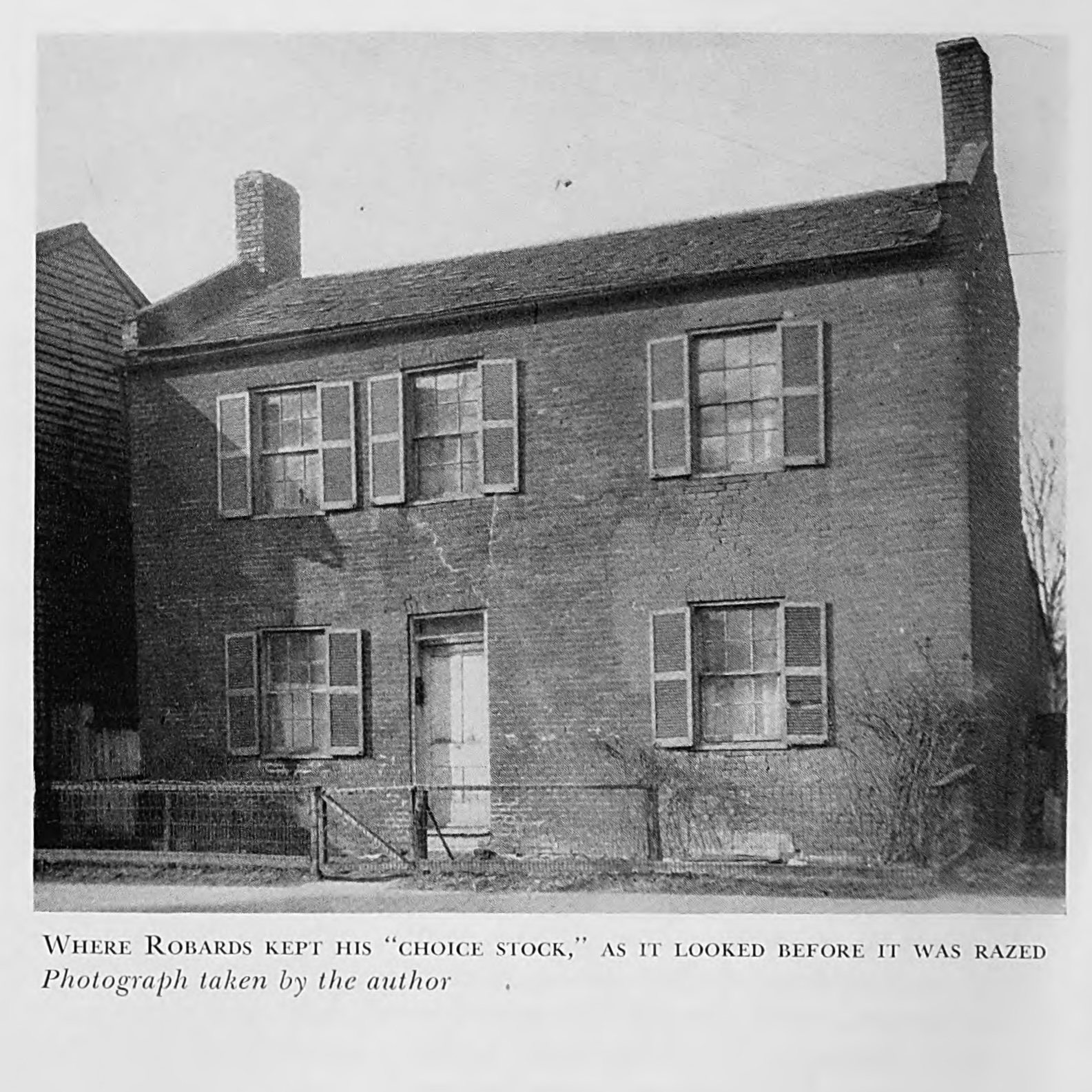
Lewis C. Robards' house of rape, from Lincoln and the Bluegrass: Slavery and Civil War in Kentucky by William H. Townsend (1955)

According to Black Life on the Mississippi: Slaves, Free Blacks, and the Western Steamboat World, "Robards' business transporting slaves downriver was so large that he found it profitable to sell some of his slaves to smaller dealers rather than manage the shipment of all his purchases himself. His Negro jail was a converted old theater where octoroons and mulattos in the 'fancy girl' trade were stripped and displayed for buyers in the lavish upper chambers. Less valuable slaves were confined in the basement, or 'dungeon,' where they waited in darkness for the voyage away from home." Robards also had a slave pen behind his house on North Broadway, with "tiny brick cells eight feet square, furnished with straw and ventilated with a small iron-grated window high on the heavy wooden door." The women were kept on the upper story of Robards' West Short Street building. This building apparently had a bar and after drinks, Robards would take his customers upstairs "encouraging them to conduct intimate examinations of the women's bodies." According to J. Winston Coleman in Slavery Times in Kentucky (1940), "Robards' 'choice stock' of beautiful quadroon and octoroon girls...was indeed the talk and toast of steamboat barrooms, tippling houses and taverns, even as far away as old New Orleans. Over the mint julep, planters' punch, and other potent beverages which make men reminiscent, many short-necked, beady-eyed Frenchmen and gangling hawk-faced Kentuckians and Tennesseans swapped vivid stories of the 'inspections' in Robards' jail, where the 'choice stock,' stripped to the skin, dumbly submitted to the leering gaze and intimate examination of traders ostensibly interested only in the physical soundness of prospective purchases."

Robards' business was funded, in part, by John H. Morgan (later of the Confederate States cavalry), who lent him US$6,100 (equivalent to $205,853 in 2024). The Morgan family shared a trading agent with Robards, Rodes Woods, who sometimes represented their business interests outside of Lexington. Morgan was said to be Kentucky's first millionaire and according to his biographer this was likely true: "His estate was valued at $886,989.28; his two executors were bonded for $1,300,000 each." Some of this wealth was used to trade in slaves. This loan was "used in the business I was carrying on and was loaned and advanced me by the said Morgan for my accommodations," testified Robards. Morgan won a lawsuit against Robards for non-repayment, and in 1855 the county sheriff sold Robards' jail to the multi-state trading firm Bolton, Dickens & Co. to satisfy the obligation. Morgan also attached an enslaved woman named Rebecca; she, too, was sold to pay the debt. In 1855, fellow slave trader Calvin M. Rutherford sued Robards over the dispensation of a 36-year-old enslaved woman named Emily, who was said to be worth $500. Rutherford alleged that "[Emily] had been sent to Robards' jail to be sold at a fixed price, but no sale had been made and the defendant refused to return her to the plaintiff. Rutherford asked for the delivery of Emily plus a fee of $50 for damage and detention. The court ordered Emily to be delivered to Rutherford, and each party was to pay his own court costs."

R. C. Thompson may have also had possession of Robards' slave-prison real estate at some point before the building burned down in 1864.

Robards was sued several times during the course of his career, for selling sick or dying people while warranting them "sound." Robards was also named in a lawsuit by a woman named Henrietta Wood as one of the conspirators who kidnapped her, a free woman of color from Ohio, by inveiglement, and sold her into slavery in the Deep South. The case of Henrietta Wood was neither the first nor the last time he was accused of selling people who had been kidnapped people into slavery.

At the time of the 1860 census, L. C. Robards, trader, and his seven-year-old son Thomas, lived in the same household in Lexington as R. W. Lucas, trader. At the time of the 1870 census, 55-year-old "Louis C. Roberds" lived in the household of a 74-year-old farmer named George C. Roberds in Smith Mills, Henderson County, Kentucky, near the Mount Vernon post office.

== See also ==
- List of American slave traders
- Slave trade in the United States
- History of slavery in Kentucky
- William A. Pullum – American slave trader (~1809–1876)
- Abijah Hunt – American planter and slave trader (1762–1811)
