= Alfred O. Robards =

American slave trader and grocer (1824–1884)

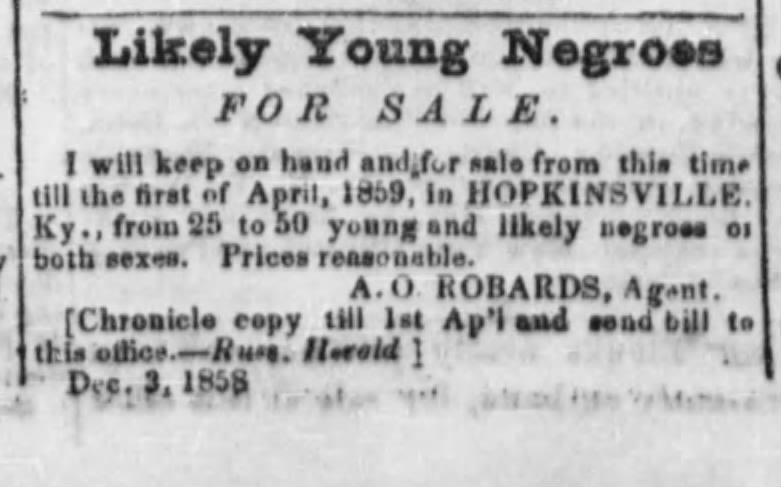
- "Likely Young Negroes FOR SALE. I will keep on hand for sale from this time till the first of April, 1859, in HOPKINSVILLE, Ky. from 25 to 50 young and likely negroes both sexes. Prices reasonable. A.O ROBARDS, Agent" (Clarksville Chronicle, Clarksville, Tenn.)
- Born: May 10, 1824; Kentucky?
- Died: January 10, 1884 (aged 59); Harrodsburg, Kentucky, U.S.
- Other name: A. O. Robards

Alfred Olahan Robards was a 19th-century slave trader and grocer of Kentucky, United States.

According to a family history published in 1910, A. O. Robards was the youngest child of Nancy Merriman and George Lewis Robards (b. 1795). Alfred O. Robards sometimes worked at slave trading in partnership with his brother Lewis C. Robards. The Robards brothers may have started as field agents for, first, Lexington slave trader Joseph H. Northcutt, and, second, Lexington slave trader R. W. Lucas. Alfred O. Robards was one of a number of agents who worked for Lewis Robards "in all the Bluegrass counties and those bordering on the Ohio River—buying and selling slaves, and sometimes stealing and kidnapping free Negroes." A. O. Robards was likely involved in some trading independent of L. C. Robards.

According to Carol Wilson in Freedom at Risk: The Kidnapping of Free Blacks in America, 1780–1865, circa 1851, Alfred O. Robards had possession of Hilda Polley, Mary Jane Polley, Martha Polley, and Peyton Polley Jr., four of the Peyton Polley children who were kidnapped from their beds in Lawrence County, Ohio, June 6, 1850, by a gang of four white men led by David Justice. In 1856 A. O. Robards advertised that "Persons wishing to dispose of negroes can always find a purchaser by calling on the undersigned at Harrodsburg."

At the time of the 1860 census, Robards was a resident of the fourth ward of Lexington, Kentucky, occupation trader. At the time of the 1870 and 1880 censuses he was married with a family, and working as a grocer in Harrodsburg, Kentucky. Robards was a master mason in the Warren Lodge of Kentucky Freemasons. He appears in an 1884 Kentucky business directory as partner in a grocery, hardware, and farm implements business, "special agents, Milburn wagon." Robards died in 1884 after a "long and painful illness" and was buried in Spring Hill Cemetery in Harrodsburg, Kentucky.

== See also ==
- List of American slave traders
- Slave trade in the United States
- History of slavery in Kentucky
- Kidnapping into slavery in the United States
