= Bolton, Dickens & Co. =

American slave-trading business

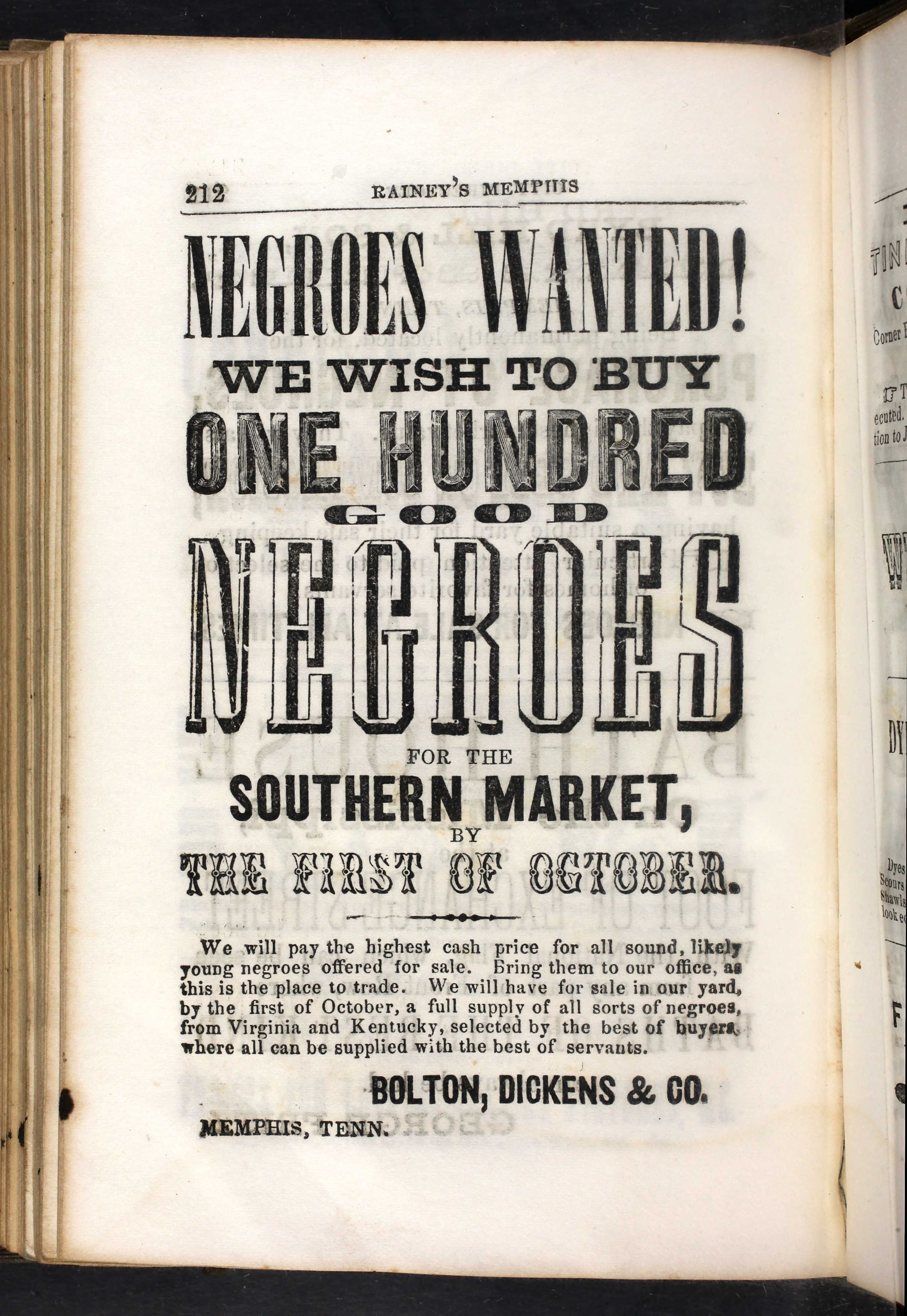
Bolton, Dickens & Co. advertisement in the Memphis, Tennessee, city directory of 1855

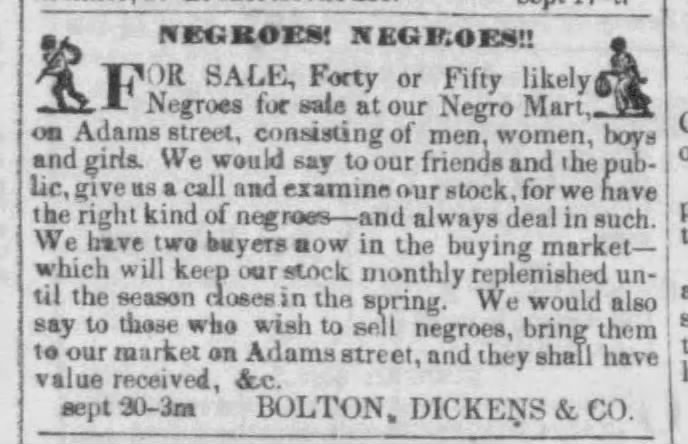
NEGROES! NEGROES!! For sale, forty or fifty likely Negroes for sale at our Negro Mart, on Adams street, consisting of men, women, boys and girls. We would say to our friends and the public, give us a call and examine our stock, for we have the right kind of negroes—and always deal in such. We have two buyers now in the buying market—which will keep our stock replenished until the season closes in the spring. We would also say to those who wish to sell negroes, bring them to our market on Adams street, and they shall have value received, &c. BOLTON, DICKENS & CO. (Memphis Daily Eagle, September 26, 1849)

Bolton, Dickens & Co. was a slave-trading business of the antebellum United States, headquartered in Memphis, Tennessee. Several principals of the firm eventually shot and killed one another as part of a long-running dispute over money, events known as the Bolton–Dickens feud. A Bolton & Dickens account ledger survived the American Civil War and is a valuable primary source on the interstate slave trade.

== Family business ==
"NEGROES FOR SALE. — I have again returned to this market, with 18 or 20 likely negroes. I have located on the corner of Main and Adams-streets. I have plough-boys, men, women, and girls, and some very fancy ones. I intend to keep a constant supply through the season, and will not be undersold by any in market. My motto is, 'the swift penny; the slow shilling' I never get.

"I will also pay the highest cash price for young negroes.

"November 21, 1846.

W. H. Bolton."

Beginning in 1846, a clan by the name of Bolton began using the Mississippi River and rail lines for slave arbitrage, which is to say, buying and selling people as commodities. Wade H. Bolton, Isaac L. Bolton, Jefferson Bolton, Washington Bolton, and Thomas Dickins (Note: The firm was Bolton & Dickens but the people seemed to use both Dickens, like the writer, and Dickins, with two Is. It may be that advertisements placed by the Boltons misspelled Dickins as Dickens, while advertisements placed by Dickins misspelled Bolton as Bolten.) formed a business partnership, which continued until 1857. According to Chase C. Mooney's history of slavery in Tennessee, "Dickins did much of the scouting around; Washington was at Lexington; Isaac spent most of his time at Vicksburg; and Wade looked after the Memphis office." As one history put it, "To summarize the general business plan, Bolton, Dickins and Co. sent agents to places where enslaved people were no longer needed, bought them, and forced them to move to markets where they could be sold for more money...Bolton, Dickens & Co. might buy 20 slaves from someone in St. Louis and sell them to someone in New Orleans; or buy 50 in Memphis and sell them in Vicksburg, Miss.; or buy 100 in Vicksburg and deliver them to Texas."

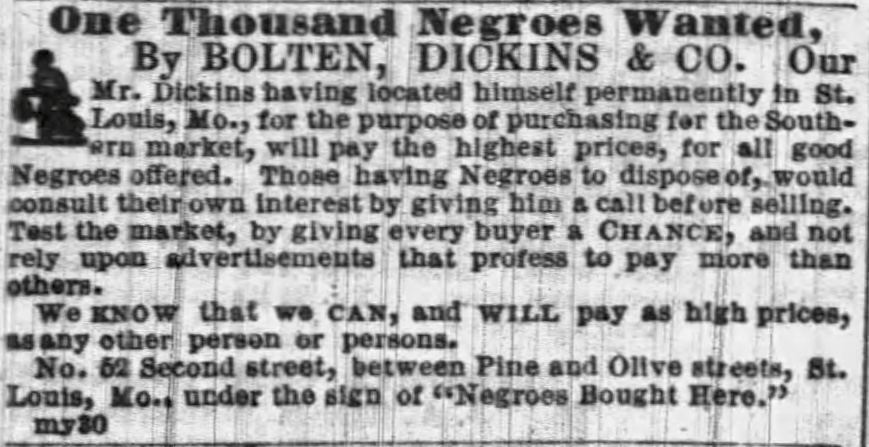
"One Thousand Negroes Wanted" St. Louis Globe-Democrat, May 22, 1854

Bolton, Dickens & Co. make multiple brief appearances in Harriet Beecher Stowe's A Key to Uncle Tom's Cabin, including a reprint of an advertisement apparently placed by Thomas Dickins: "NEGROES WANTED. I will pay at all times the highest price in cash for all good negroes offered. I am buying for the Memphis and Louisiana markets, and can afford to pay, and will pay, as high as any trading man in this State. All those having negroes to sell will do well to give me a call at No. 210, corner of Sixth and Wash streets, St. Louis, Mo. Thos. Dickins."

Bolton, Dickens & Co. had an "immense slave pen at the foot of Howard Row on the river front" in Memphis. An 1875 newspaper recounting of the family firm's rise and fall retold the history this way:

The business firm known as Bolton & Dickens had their location in a conspicuous building situated on the bluff in front of the lower part of the city near the once famous Gayoso House. Tourists on passing steamers—then the only method of traveling—invariably had their attention called to the large painted letters which adorned the riverside wall of their structure and which read "Bolton & Dickens slave dealers". The sign and the firm both figure in Mrs. Beecher Stowe's story of Uncle Tom and many letter writers of the day referred and often commented severely upon it and Bolton and Dickens had more than a national reputation. They had branch houses at New Orleans and elsewhere and their agents penetrated every section of the country south of Mason and Dixon's line in search of black people to supply the demands of their customers who embraced planters throughout the entire Southwest. Many persons and large sums of money were employed to aid them in their traffic.

Highly networked and entrepreneurial, the ring expanded rapidly and eventually had Bolton & Dickens branches in a number of American cities, including New Orleans, Vicksburg, Mobile, Lexington, Richmond, Charleston, Natchez, St. Louis, and Jefferson City, Missouri. (Note: One history, considered unreliable, suggests that Nathan Bedford Forrest was trained by Bolton, Dickens & Co. but two university historians specializing in the history of slavery in Tennessee have not found any evidence validating this claim. Forrest seems to have had much closer to ties to Byrd Hill than to the Bolton and Dickins families.)

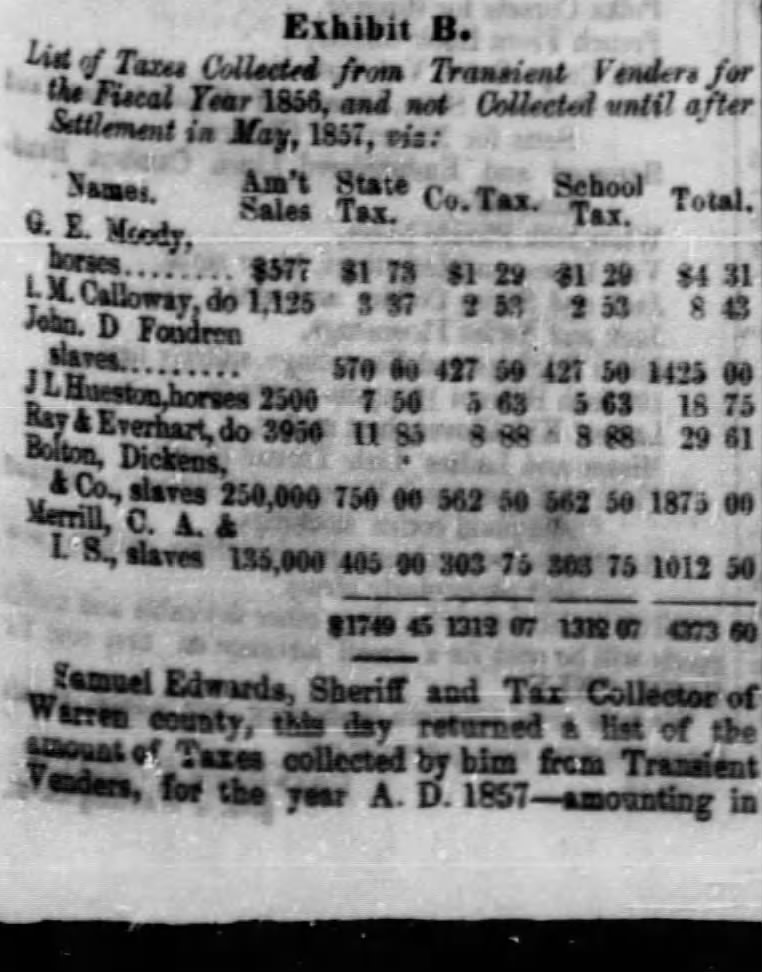
For the fiscal year 1856, Bolton, Dickens & Co. paid $1,875 in taxes on US$250,000 (equivalent to $8,958,333 in 2025) in slave sales in Warren County, Mississippi ("List of taxes collected from transient venders for the fiscal year 1856" Vicksburg Daily Whig, May 15, 1858)

At their peak, presumably in 1856, the Bolton family reportedly had a net worth of US$1,000,000 (equivalent to $35,833,333 in 2025). For the fiscal year 1856, Bolton, Dickens & Co. paid $1,875 in taxes on US$250,000 (equivalent to $8,958,333 in 2025) in slave sales in just one county in Mississippi. Court records include a claim that the firm had annual transactions "amounting in the aggregate to several millions of dollars". The partnership collapsed around 1857, but Washington Bolton (as an individual) was listed as a slave dealer in the 1860 Memphis city directory.

== Personnel ==
Principals of Bolton, Dickens & Co.
Last	First	Birth date	Death date	Death place	Cause of death
Bolton	Isaac Langston	January 13, 1811	November 13, 1864	Big Creek	Delirium tremens
Bolton	Jefferson	c. 1816	c. 1849	Unknown	Unknown
Bolton	Wade Hampton	December 8, 1812	July 20, 1869	Memphis, Tenn.	Shot and killed by Tom Dickins; Dickins and son acquitted at trial
Bolton	Washington	c. 1814	1862	Shelby Depot, Tenn.	Unknown
Dickins	Thomas	July 12, 1809	July 30, 1870	Country road in Hatchie River bottom, Tenn.	Shot and killed by person(s) unknown

=== Agents ===
- Reuben Bartlett, St. Louis

== Slave jails ==
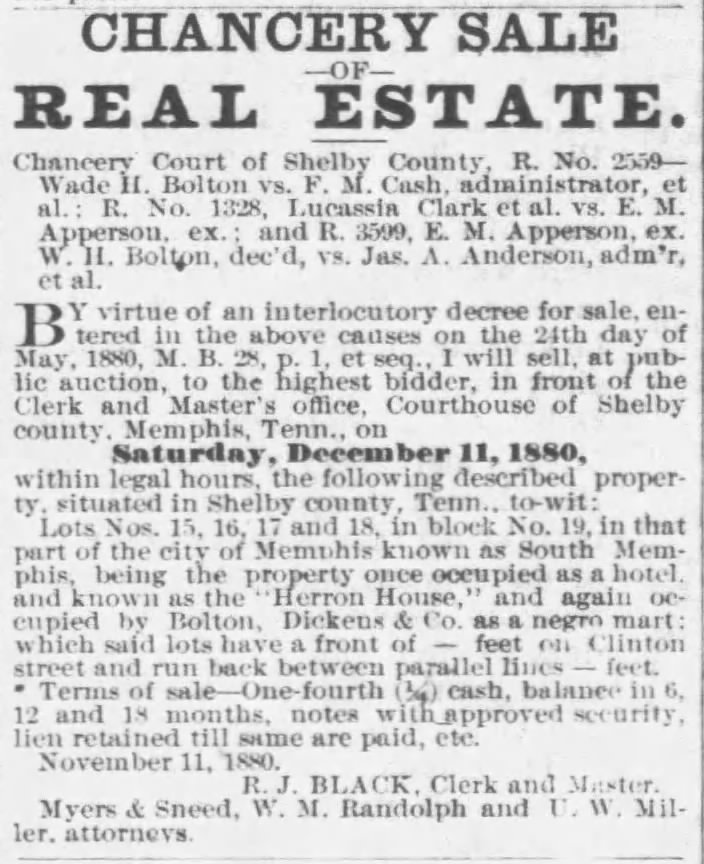
"Chancery Sale of Real Estate" (Daily Memphis Avalanche, Dec. 1, 1880)

The firm's Memphis slave jail was in a building that had formerly been the Herron House hotel. Herron House was first opened in 1843. Herron House was said to be a wood-frame structure "at Howard's Row (now Union Avenue) and the river." In 1855 Bolton, Dickens & Co. bought the Lexington, Kentucky, slave jail that had previously belonged to Lewis C. Robards.

== Family feud ==
In what amounted to a West Tennessee gangland war, at least half a dozen people were shot or killed in relation to Bolton, Dickens & Co. business dispute beginning in 1856 and ending in 1870. One account claims 19 people were killed, six of whose names have been lost to history but were recently emancipated former slaves of the Boltons and the Dickens families who were murdered by family "guards" as the most violent phase of the feud got underway in 1868.

Wade and Isaac were brothers, and Wash and Jefferson were brothers, and both sets of brothers were second cousins, both being descended from a Virginian named Charles Bolton (or Boulton), who lived 1700 to 1767. Also, Isaac L. Bolton married Cinderella Bolton, his second cousin and Washington and Jefferson's sister. Later, Isaac and Cinderella's daughter Josephine Bolton married Thomas Dickins' son Samuel. Isaac and Cinderella's daughter Mary Louisa Bolton first married Thomas Dickins' son William. William Dickins died in 1863, and Mary Louisa Bolton Dickins remarried a man named Elijah C. Patterson, who was later charged (also tried and acquitted) as an accessory in attacks on the Thomas Dickins household on behalf of Wade Bolton.

Jefferson Bolton died early in history of the business (late 1840s), but one of his surviving daughters married a half-first-cousin named John C. Bolton. John C. Bolton was a lawyer who took up for his wife Mary and her sisters' suit seeking their late father's share of the business; John C. Bolton was reportedly involved in shootouts with his second-cousin-once-removed Wade H. Bolton that broke out during legal depositions. John C. Bolton and Thomas Dickins were also apparently near neighbors who socialized. Also, apropos of nothing, Thomas Dickins' wife was born Martha Bolling Eppes Vaughn, and was first cousins twice removed to Thomas Jefferson's wife Martha Wayles.

== Business ledger ==
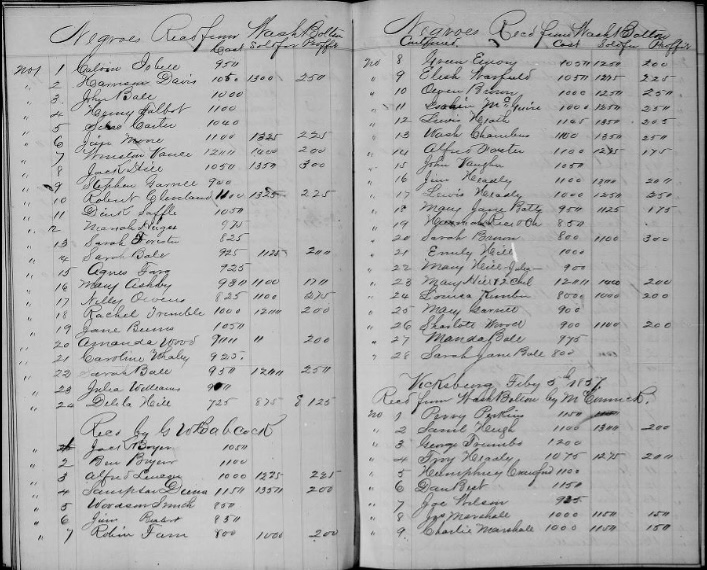
1857 in the United States: "Negroes rec'd" from Wash Bolton, G.W. Babcock, et al. listed by name with columns for cost, sold for, and profit made. Average profit was about US$200 (equivalent to $6,911 in 2025). There are 68 names on just these two sheets of the ledger. (New-York Historical Society)

A company ledger dating from 1856 to 1858 is held at the New-York Historical Society. The Memphis Public Library has a full digital transcript made by Shirley C. Neeley. Per the catalog notes, "Pages 1–38 are a day-to-day accounting by Isaac Bolton for the months of March and April 1865. Pages 39–79 list the names of slaves, purchase prices, etc. Pages 80–91 include entries for sale of slaves. Pages 92–99 are transcriptions of correspondence and the last section includes newspaper articles and advertisements."

== See also ==
- Bolton High School (Tennessee) § History
- Slave markets and slave jails in the United States
- Nashville Market House – Slave auction house and commercial building in Tennessee
- African-American genealogy – Field of genealogy pertaining to African-Americans
- List of Tennessee slave traders
- History of Memphis, Tennessee
- West Tennessee
- Tennessee in the American Civil War
