= George H. Collin =

American politician

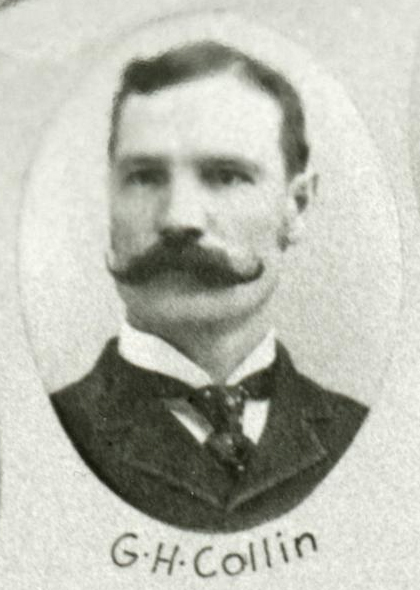
- Collin in 1895

Member of the Washington House of Representatives for the 2nd district
- In office 1893–1897

Personal details
- Born: June 4, 1856 Yorkshire, England
- Died: January 1, 1938 (aged 81) Spokane, Washington, United States
- Party: Populist

George Henry Collin (June 4, 1856 – January 1, 1938) was an American politician in the state of Washington. He served in the Washington House of Representatives.
