= Morning Sun, Tennessee =

Archaic place name in Shelby County, Tennessee

Morning Sun is an archaic place name in Shelby County, Tennessee in the United States. Morning Sun is about 18 miles (29 km) east of Memphis.

== History ==
There was a stage coach road between Morning Sun and Brunswick, Tennessee. The Morning Sun post office opened in 1830 at the Seed Tick and Old Stage Coach crossroad. Morning Sun Cemetery is a Presbyterian cemetery located at Morning Sun Cumberland Presbyterian Church, founded in 1852. Morning Sun was the site of the so-called Battle of Morning Sun during the American Civil War, described as "Confederate cavalry raid on a well-guarded Union wagon train." An 1886 letter to the Memphis Avalanche described the town as somewhat languishing: "Those who knew Morning Sun before the war and see it now would not recognize it as the same. There are but few of the old citizens here and the business part has moved higher up. We have two one-horse stores and two steam mills and gins with saw attached to one owned by J. B. Stewart and the Russels. As there was a good corn crop last year the whistles are heard every Saturday and both I believe are kept busy."
