= Vine Street (TV series) =

Vine Street, considered the first American television soap opera, was first broadcast on 15 April 1938 by W6XAO in Los Angeles, as a daily 15-minute serial, and was listed as a comedy-drama. The storyline involved Hollywood life on the lowest rungs of the "ladder" to success. The light humor drama shows the struggles to make it big in Tinsel Town. The stars were Broadway and radio character actors John Barkeley and Shirley Thomas, neither of whom appeared on television again. The writers, Maurice Ashley and Wilfred Pettit, were brought in from the radio networks to experiment in this new medium.

== Firsts ==
While Germany, England and the United States were all attempting to produce television programming in 1935, America did not create any type of regularly scheduled programming until 1939, and offered the public such pioneers as the children's show Kukla, Fran and Ollie, Betty White and programs featuring Eddie Albert, who became one of the first television actors in 1935. Vine Street apparently lasted for less than a year. The birthplace of television was in Schenectady, New York in 1928; however, as fast as it was maturing in New York, it was also becoming a powerhouse in California.

Audiences were already accustomed to continuing story serials from the radio, but this was the first attempt on television. The term "soap opera" came about since many soap and cleaning product companies started trying to reach the many housewives who were home to listen these programs which normally aired in the afternoons. The Oxford English Dictionary's citation for the phrase dates its first appearance in print to 1938.
