= Charles Ellis Johnson =

American Latter-day Saint photographer

Charles E. Johnson
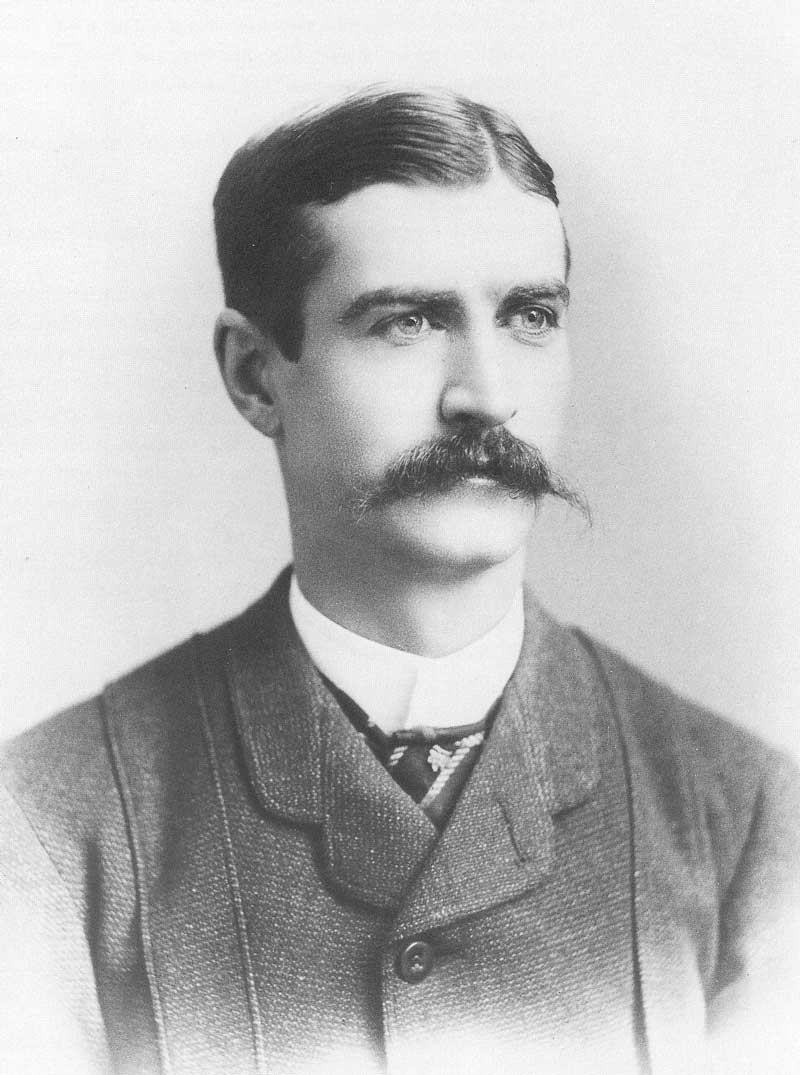
- Born: March 21, 1857; St. Louis, Missouri, U.S.
- Died: February 21, 1926 (aged 68); San Jose, California, U.S.
- Resting place: Oak Hill Memorial Park
- Style: Stereoscopy
- Spouse: Ruth Young

Charles Ellis "Charlie" Johnson (March 21, 1857 – February 21, 1926) was an American Latter-day Saint photographer known for his work both in Utah and around the world. He grew up in St. George, Utah, and gained an interest in botany and theater. While operating a drug store in Salt Lake City, he started dabbling in photography and opened a photo studio. He photographed actors and actresses at the Salt Lake Theater, including some artistic nudes. He took photos of Utah attractions, and in 1903 traveled through the Ottoman Empire to take photos for the 1904 St. Louis World's Fair. In 1917 Johnson moved to San Jose, California, where he continued operating a photo studio.

== Biography ==
=== Early life ===
Charles Ellis Johnson's father Joseph Ellis Johnson started practicing polygamy in the 1850s and married his third wife, Eliza Saunders, in 1856. Eliza gave birth to Charles on March 21, 1857, in St. Louis, Missouri, after which they lived in small Mormon settlements in Nebraska. Charles and his family were members of the Church of Jesus Christ of Latter-day Saints (LDS Church). In 1860 Charles, his mother, and four of his orphaned cousins traveled across the plains to Salt Lake City. The next year Joseph and his two other wives joined them. Joseph said that he "did not wish for the city life" and purchased land near Payson and Santaquin in Utah Valley and moved there. In 1865 the Johnson family moved to St. George. Charles learned how to write and operate printing presses. He worked with botanist C. C. Parry to botanize plants in southern Utah. He also worked for botanist and archaeologist Edward Palmer by helping excavate Indian burial mounds and collecting various specimens. Charles learned how to speak some Native American languages to talk to local tribe members. He also gained an interest in theater during this time. Charles did not have a formal education.

Brigham Young had a winter home in St. George, which was adjacent to the Johnson home. Growing up, Charles became acquainted with the Young family. One of Brigham's daughters, Susa Amelia Young, was a member of Charles's theatrical troupe. Susa arranged for Charles to date her half-sister, Ruth Young. Charles and Ruth were married in the St. George Temple on January 28, 1878. They had three children, two boys and one girl. In 1882 Charles Johnson, his wife, and their child moved to a small house in central Salt Lake City. Ruth eventually left Charles, who then filed for divorce in 1887.

=== Career ===
In Salt Lake City, Johnson worked as a druggist for the ZCMI. In 1889 he partnered with Parley P. Pratt to operate the Johnson-Pratt Drug Company. Johnson made and sold various family patent medicines, including his "Valley Tan Remedies." As recited by his niece Maude Fox Fairbanks, this catchy limerick, "Snow in the Mountains, Rain in the Hills, Old Man Died Eating Johnson's Pills," conveys the tragic effects from overconsumption of his laxative preparations, anise in a sweetened coating. The mountains were the Wasatch Front located east of the City [Oral Fairbanks Family History]. During the 1890s, he became involved in the American Star Bicycle craze by selling them and becoming vice president of Salt Lake's Social Wheel bicycle club.

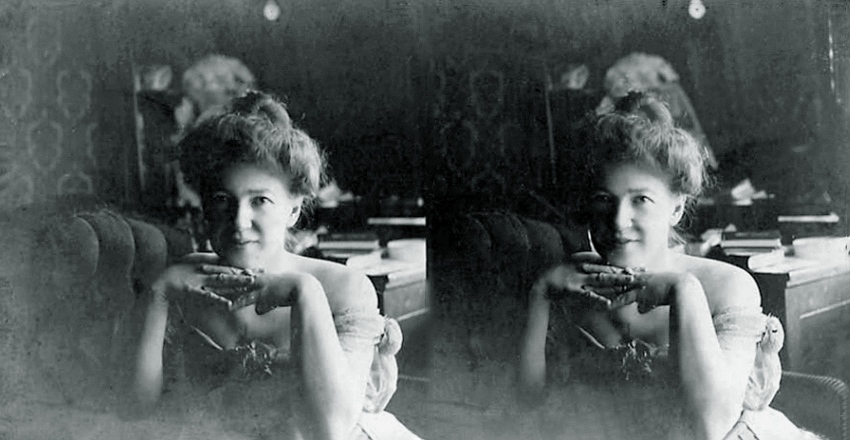
One of Johnson's risqué stereoviews, depicting writer Ella Wheeler Wilcox, c. 1903

After dabbling in photography, Johnson joined Hyrum Sainsbury to open a photographic studio. Johnson soon became the undesignated "official photographer" of the Salt Lake Theatre. He was the official Utah correspondent for the New York Dramatic Mirror. He started taking risqué photographs, likely because of his work with burlesque theater, and often incorporated elements of orientalism. He took glamour photographs of actresses, artistic nudes, and risqué stereoviews. He was the only Mormon photographer during his time who sold risqué photographs.

In the 1890s, Johnson became the unofficial photographer for the LDS Church. He photographed the dedication of the Salt Lake Temple and LDS Church leaders. He traveled with the Mormon Tabernacle Choir to the Chicago World's Fair in 1893, and visited San Francisco in 1896. Johnson advertised his studio as an "Information Bureau [for] everything about Utah and the Mormons." He became a "social Mormon" by maintaining the appearance of being a Mormon while eventually dissociating himself from the LDS Church. While Johnson spent most of his time in Utah, he also traveled extensively, taking photographs in New York, Paris, and London. His trademark phrase was "You see Johnson all over the World."

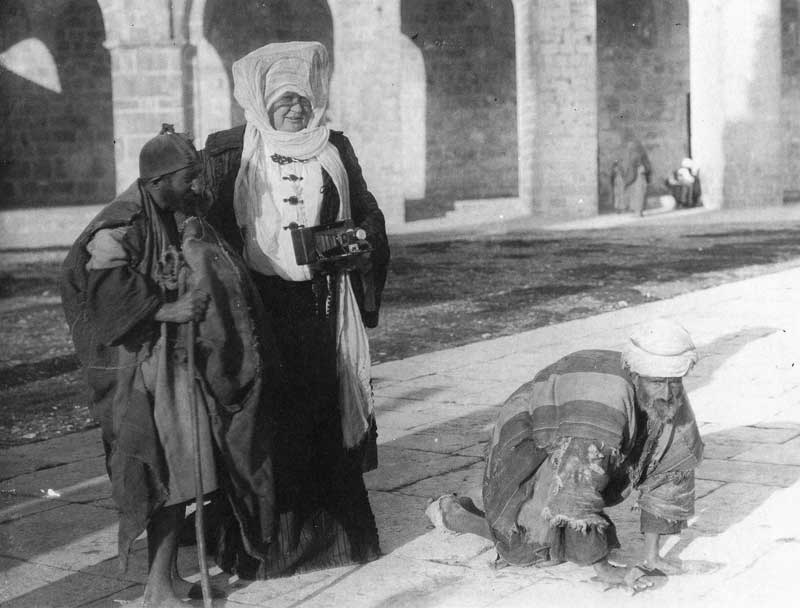
Lydia Mountford (center) stands in the streets of Palestine during Johnson's 1903 tour.

In 1897 Johnson photographed and befriended the actress Lydia Mary Olive Von Finkelstein Mamreov Mountford at the Salt Lake Theater. Mountford returned to Utah in 1903 and hired Johnson as a photographer for her Jerusalem exhibit at the St. Louis World's Fair. They traveled through Palestine and Jerusalem in the Ottoman Empire taking pictures of the scenery. At the World Fair in 1904, Johnson and Mountford found that the exhibit's management had repudiated Mountford's contract. Johnson tried with little success to market his photos in St. Louis.

After returning from his tour, Johnson formed an "unconventional relationship" with businesswoman Minnie B. Ridley and hired her to help him with his businesses in Salt Lake City. Ridley died suddenly from Bright's disease in 1914, after working for Johnson for 12 years. In 1917 he liquidated his assets and moved to San Jose, California, to live with the Ridley family, where he operated another photographic studio. He died from a heart seizure on February 21, 1926, and was buried in Oak Hill Memorial Park.
