= Magdalena Hergert Becker =

American Mennonite missionary (1878–1938)

Magdalena Hergert Becker (August 4, 1878 – July 7, 1938) was a pioneer Mennonite missionary. She served as Field Matron at Post Oak Missionary in Oklahoma for 28 years. The matron position was one created by the US government to assist with assimilation efforts. Becker was considered a success in the matron program as some Native Americans did identify as Christian.

== Biography ==
Becker was born to farmers Wilhelm and Magdalena Hergert in Ebenfeld, Kansas (also disputed to be Hillsboro, Kansas) on August 4, 1878, and her family moved to Fairview, Kansas in 1894.

Becker witnessed filming of the 1920 silent film Daughter of Dawn, with a native cast of Kiowa and Comanche. She complained in her weekly report to the Bureau of Indian Affairs: "Went to a camp close to headquarters where their [sic] are about 300 Kiowas and Comanches gathered dancing and having pictures taken to be used in the movies.... I talked to the manager to have the camp broken up and dances stopped. These dances and large gatherings week after week are ruining our Indian boys and girls as they have been going on for about three months at different places. No work done during these days." A Comanche scholar wrote that her "amusing attempt to claim jurisdiction over "our" Natives' labor and assembly joins centuries of colonizing tactics against the Indigenous."

Becker was married to Abraham "A.J." Becker, a Mennonite missionary. They had 7 children with 1 dying in infancy.

Becker retired from her field matron work in 1932 and later died from liver disease on July 7, 1938 in Indiahoma, Oklahoma (also disputed to be Chickasha, Oklahoma). Over 1,500 people attended her funeral service at Post Oak Cemetery. Abraham remarried to a woman named Katharina Poetker in 1941, and died in Lawton, Oklahoma around 1957. He is buried next to Magdalena.
