= Peter F. Donnelly =

American patron of the arts

Peter F. Donnelly (October 6, 1938 – March 28, 2009) was an American patron of the arts. He was a former vice-chairman of Americans for the Arts, a co-founder of the Seattle Arts Commission and a pivotal figure in the Seattle artistic community for more than 45 years.

Born in Lynn, Massachusetts, Donnelly graduated from Boston University and moved to Seattle in 1964 as a Ford Foundation management fellow to work with the fledgling Seattle Repertory Theatre as the first managing director and later as producing director, during his 21-year tenure.

In 1986, Donnelly left Seattle to take the position of the producing director of the Dallas Theater Center, returning to Seattle in 1989 to at the request of local business leaders to head the Seattle Corporate Council for the Arts, which later became ArtsFund, where he served as president and CEO until retiring in 2005. In honor of his retirement, the ArtsFund created the Peter F. Donnelly Merit Fund for Arts Endowments.

Donnelly is credited with being instrumental in the building of the Seattle Repertory Theatre's Bagley Wright Theater and the development of the Building for the Arts program, a primary funding source for Seattle's Benaroya Hall, Intiman Theater, Seattle Children's Theatre, as well as 150 other arts facilities. In 2001 the Seattle Public Library honored Donnelly by naming one of their five major collections as The Peter F. Donnelly Art and Literature Collection. Donnelly also served on the board of directors for the Frye Art Museum, the 5th Avenue Theatre, the University of Washington School of Drama Advisory Committee and Classic KING-FM Radio Station.

== Death ==
Donnelly died on March 28, 2009, a week after being diagnosed with advanced pancreatic cancer and is survived by his partner, David Farrar, of Seattle as well as two sisters.

== Awards ==
National Coalition of United Arts Fund's Michael Newton Award – 1995

2005 Mayor's Arts Award: Tour de Force
