= Barbara Ann Rowan =

American attorney (1938–2020)

- Born: September 6, 1938; Upper Manhattan, New York, U.S.
- Died: October 31, 2020 (aged 82); Arlington County, Virginia, U.S.
- Education: Barnard College; University of Madrid; New York University School of Law
- Title: Assistant United States Attorney for the Southern District of New York
- Term: 1971–1974

Barbara Ann Rowan (September 6, 1938 – October 31, 2020) was an American attorney. She was the first Black woman to be a prosecutor in the office of the United States Attorney for the Southern District of New York.

== Early life and education ==
Barbara Ann Rowan was born on September 6, 1938, in Upper Manhattan, New York. An only child, her parents Norman B. Rowan and Clara (Obey) Rowan worked together in Norman's accountant practice. Clara was from Philadelphia while Norman had immigrated to the US from Jamaica, becoming a citizen and raising Barbara in a West Indian community in Harlem. Extended family members included two lawyers and a judge.

Rowan attended the Dalton School, a private school that had begun integrating in the 1940s. She graduated in 1956, then matriculated at Barnard College, studying Spanish (she also spoke fluent Italian). She graduated with a bachelor's degree in 1960 and also earned a Certificate of Language and Literature from the University of Madrid. She next turned to law school, enrolling in New York University School of Law's evening program while working as a court interpreter during the day. She earned a JD in 1968.

== Legal career ==
Rowan began her legal practice working as a defense attorney with Community Action for Legal Services (later called South Bronx Legal Services) as well as in private practice. The work did not suit her as she often found herself more sympathetic to her clients' victims. One day a judge, after Rowan had argued successfully in his court, asked if she was interested in becoming a prosecutor. She said yes and got a call from the deputy to Whitney North Seymour Jr., then United States Attorney for the Southern District of New York (SDNY). She was hired as an Assistant United States Attorney (AUSA) for the Criminal Division, becoming the first Black woman to be an SDNY prosecutor. She was one of only two women attorneys in the division when she joined. She stayed three years, prosecuting drug crimes and fraud.

In the later part of the 1970s, John Nields hired her on the U.S. House of Representatives ethics committee to investigate the Koreagate scandal. She next became assistant director of the Federal Trade Commission.

Leaving government, in 1980 she started a private investigations consultancy, Rowan Associates, which her husband joined a few years later when he left the Federal Bureau of Investigation (FBI). Attending her first meeting of the Alexandria Bar Association in northern Virginia in 1982, Rowan was shocked to hear a racial slur in a speech, which then drew a standing ovation from all others present—she was the only Black attorney in the room of roughly 100 attendees. She recounted the episode to colleagues and eight Black lawyers sent a letter expressing their "collective outrage" this would take place at an "ostensibly integrated bar". The episode ultimately prompted the creation of a new group, the Northern Virginia Black Attorneys Association.

In the mid-1980s, Rowan was a member of the President's Commission on Organized Crime, which controversially recommended drug testing all federal employees. Ultimately, she was one of the commissioners who signed a letter criticizing the "mismanagement" of the project, saying that as a consequence the final report left significant areas of organized crime unexamined, for instance "failing to address the roles of American black and Jewish organizations in organized crime." Half the commission signed the statement.

== Personal life ==
A 1971 profile in the New York Amsterdam News described Rowan as "an accomplished swimmer and dancer." She was then living in Harlem with her parents. In 1972, she married Harold W. Gossett II, an FBI agent she met through her work as a prosecutor.

Rowan died from COVID-19 at a hospital in Arlington County, Virginia, on October 31, 2020, at age 82, amidst the COVID-19 pandemic in Virginia.
