= Memphis Avalanche =

U.S. newspaper (1857–1890)

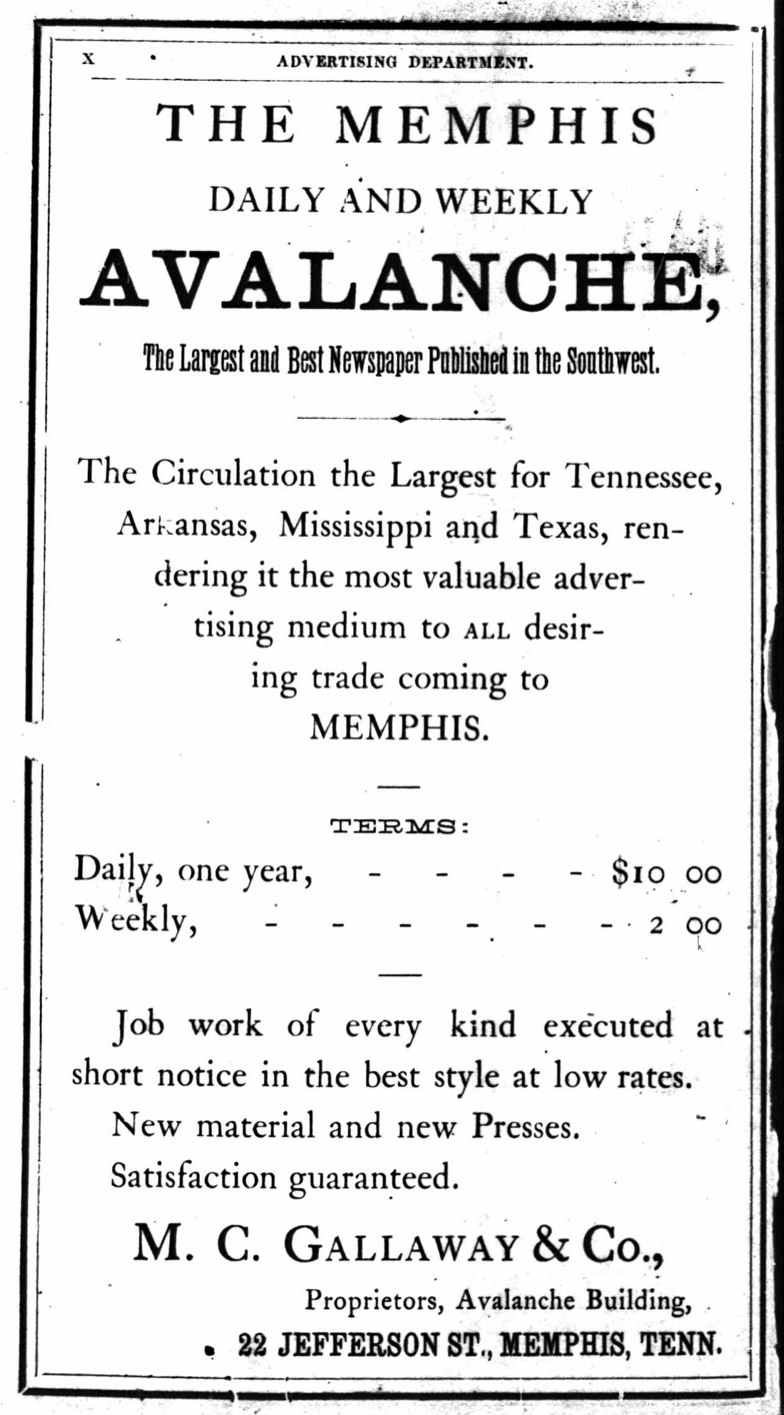
Memphis Avalanche ad in Memphis city directory, 1870

The Memphis Avalanche, also Memphis Daily Avalanche, was a newspaper of Tennessee in the United States that was published from 1858 to 1862, and then from 1866 until 1890. The Memphis Avalanche-Appeal was published from 1890 to 1894. The Avalanche supported secession prior to the American Civil War, and opposed the Republican Party for the remainder of its existence. M. C. Galloway and W. H. Rhea were the editors and publishers circa 1868.

The poetry of Lillian Rozell Messenger was first published in the Avalanche under the pen name Zena Clifton.
