= 1802 in the United States =

- Decades: 1780s; 1790s; 1800s; 1810s; 1820s
- See also: History of the United States (1789–1849); Timeline of United States history (1790–1819); List of years in the United States

Events from the year 1802 in the United States.

== Incumbents ==
=== Federal government ===
- President: Thomas Jefferson (DR-Virginia)
- Vice President: Aaron Burr (DR-New York)
- Chief Justice: John Marshall (Virginia)
- Speaker of the House of Representatives: Nathaniel Macon (DR-North Carolina)
- Congress: 7th

==== State governments ====
Governors and lieutenant governors

=== Governors ===
- Governor of Connecticut: Jonathan Trumbull Jr. (Democratic-Republican)
- Governor of Delaware: James Sykes (Democratic-Republican) (until January 19), David Hall (Democratic-Republican) (starting January 19)
- Governor of Georgia: Josiah Tattnall (Democratic-Republican) (until November 4), John Milledge (Democratic-Republican) (starting November 4)
- Governor of Kentucky: James Garrard (Democratic-Republican)
- Governor of Maryland: John Francis Mercer (Democratic-Republican)
- Governor of Massachusetts: Caleb Strong (Federalist)
- Governor of New Hampshire: John Taylor Gilman (Federalist)
- Governor of New Jersey: Joseph Bloomfield (Democratic-Republican) (until October 28), John Lambert (Democratic-Republican) (starting October 28)
- Governor of New York: George Clinton (Democratic-Republican)
- Governor of North Carolina: Benjamin Williams (Federalist) (until December 6), James Turner (Democratic-Republican) (starting December 6)
- Governor of Pennsylvania: Thomas McKean (Democratic-Republican)
- Governor of Rhode Island: Arthur Fenner (Country)
- Governor of South Carolina: John Drayton (Democratic-Republican) (until December 8), James Burchill Richardson (Democratic-Republican) (starting December 8)
- Governor of Tennessee: Archibald Roane (Democratic-Republican)
- Governor of Vermont: Isaac Tichenor (Federalist)
- Governor of Virginia: James Monroe (Democratic-Republican) (until December 1), John Page (Democratic-Republican) (starting December 1)

=== Lieutenant governors ===
- Lieutenant Governor of Connecticut: John Treadwell (Federalist)
- Lieutenant Governor of Kentucky: Alexander Scott Bullitt (political party unknown)
- Lieutenant Governor of Massachusetts: Samuel Phillips Jr. (political party unknown) (until month and day unknown), Edward Robbins (political party unknown) (starting month and day unknown)
- Lieutenant Governor of New York: Jeremiah Van Rensselaer (political party unknown)
- Lieutenant Governor of Rhode Island: Samuel J. Potter (Democratic-Republican)
- Lieutenant Governor of South Carolina: Richard Winn (Democratic-Republican) (until December 8), Ezekiel Pickens (Democratic-Republican) (starting December 8)
- Lieutenant Governor of Vermont: Paul Brigham (Democratic-Republican)

== Events ==
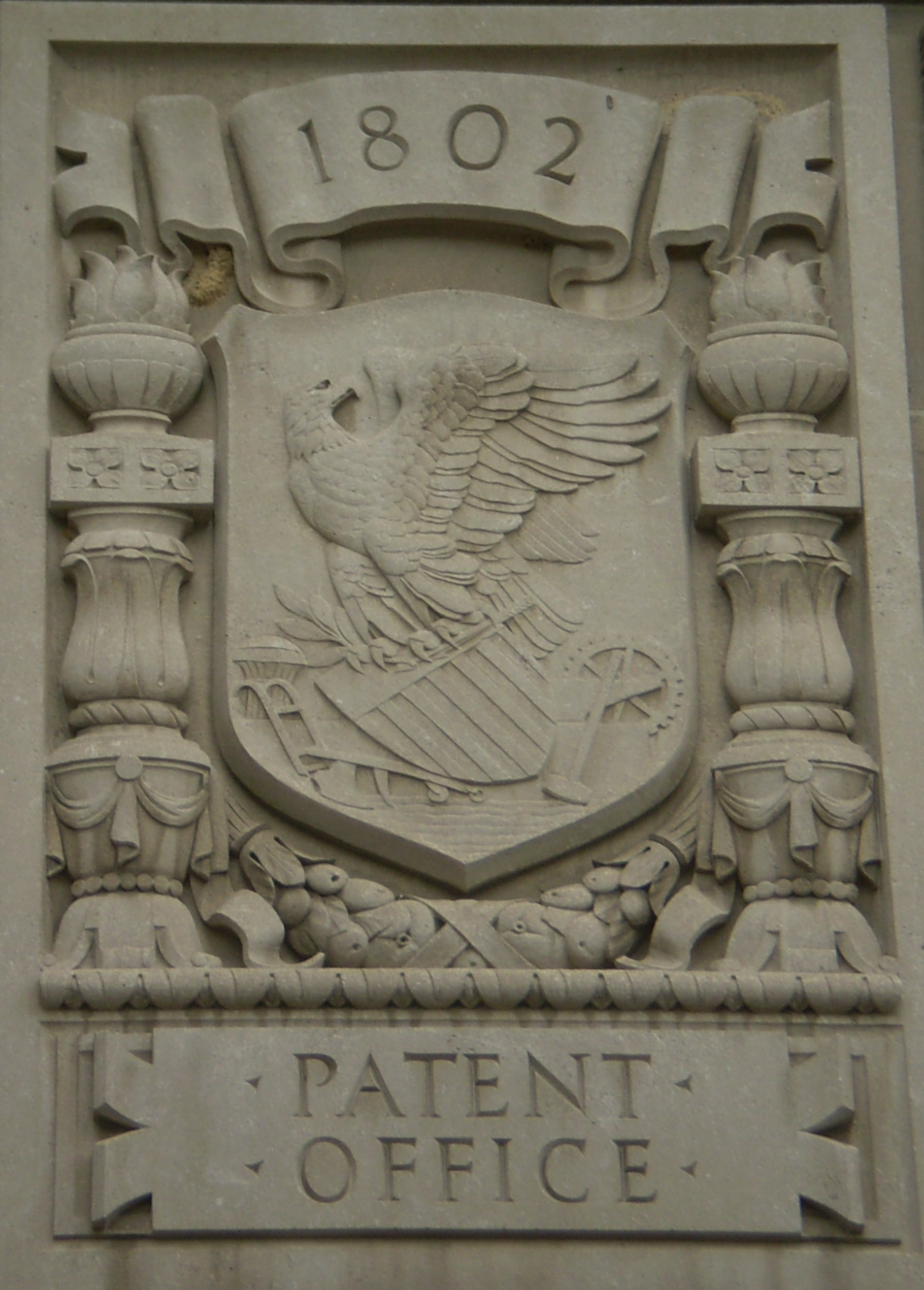
June 1: The Patent Office formed

- March 16 – Congress authorizes the establishment of the United States Military Academy at West Point, New York.
- April 19 – The Judiciary Act of 1802 is enacted, reorganizing the federal court system.
- April 30 – The Enabling Act of 1802 authorizes the creation of Ohio from the Northwest Territory and sets a precedent for the creation of future states from the western territories.
- June 1 – William Thornton is appointed the first superintendent of the United States Patent Office.
- July 4 – At West Point, New York, the United States Military Academy opens.
- October 2 – First Barbary War: Fighting ends between Sweden and Tripoli. The United States also negotiates peace, but war continues over the size of compensation.
- October 12 – Joseph Gardner Swift and Simeon Magruder Levy become the first graduates of the United States Military Academy.

=== Undated ===
- U.S. House of Representatives elections: 142 representatives are elected, 36 more than the 7th Congress, following reapportionment from the 1800 United States census.

=== Ongoing ===
- First Barbary War (1801–1805)

== Births ==
- January 22 – Richard Upjohn, Gothic architect (died 1878)
- February 4 – Mark Hopkins, educator and president of Williams College (died 1887)
- February 11 – Lydia Maria Child, abolitionist, women's rights activist, novelist and journalist (died 1880)
- February 21 – George D. Ramsay, 6th Chief of Ordnance of the United States Army (died 1882)
- March 16 – George A. McCall, Union Army brigadier general (died 1868)
- April 2 – Archibald Dixon, U.S. Senator from Kentucky from 1852 to 1855 (died 1876)
- April 4 – Dorothea Dix, mental health reformer (died 1887)
- May 10 – James Westcott, U.S. Senator from Florida from 1845 to 1849 (died 1880)
- June 10 – James W. Bradbury, U.S. Senator from Maine from 1847 to 1853 (died 1901)
- June 30 – Benjamin Fitzpatrick, U.S. Senator from Alabama from 1848 to 1849 and from 1853 to 1861 (died 1869)
- July 1 – Gideon Welles, 24th United States Secretary of the Navy (died 1878)
- July 9 – Thomas Davenport, inventor and blacksmith (died 1851)
- July 21 – David Hunter, Union Army major general (died 1886)
- August 10 – Dixon Hall Lewis, U.S. Senator from Alabama from 1844 to 1848 (died 1848)
- September 4 – Marcus Whitman, physician and missionary (died 1847)
- October 1 – Oliver Blake, American-born Canadian businessman and political figure (died 1873)
- November 5 – James F. Trotter, U.S. Senator from Mississippi in 1838 (died 1866)
- November 9 – Elijah Parish Lovejoy, newspaper publisher and abolitionist (died 1837)
- November 19 – Solomon Foot, Vermont politician (died 1866)
- December 2 – Melancthon S. Wade, Union Army general (died 1868)

== Deaths ==
- February 26 – Esek Hopkins, Commander in Chief of the Continental Navy during the Revolution (born 1718)
- May 22 – Martha Washington, the wife of George Washington, the first president of the United States (born 1731)
- July 6 – Daniel Morgan, soldier and United States Representative from Virginia (born 1736)
- December 31 – Francis Lewis, signer of the Declaration of Independence from New York (born 1713)
- n.d. – Salem Poor, formerly enslaved veteran of the Battle of Bunker Hill (born c. 1747)

== See also ==
- Timeline of United States history (1790–1819)
- Timeline of the Thomas Jefferson presidency § 1802
