= 1803 in the United States =

- Decades: 1780s; 1790s; 1800s; 1810s; 1820s
- See also: History of the United States (1789–1849); Timeline of United States history (1790–1819); List of years in the United States

Events from the year 1803 in the United States.

== Incumbents ==
=== Federal government ===
- President: Thomas Jefferson (DR-Virginia)
- Vice President: Aaron Burr (DR-New York)
- Chief Justice: John Marshall (Virginia)
- Speaker of the House of Representatives: Nathaniel Macon (DR-North Carolina)
- Congress: 7th (until March 4), 8th (starting March 4)

==== State governments ====
Governors and lieutenant governors

=== Governors ===
- Governor of Connecticut: Jonathan Trumbull Jr. (Democratic-Republican)
- Governor of Delaware: David Hall (Democratic-Republican)
- Governor of Georgia: John Milledge (Democratic-Republican)
- Governor of Kentucky: James Garrard (Democratic-Republican)
- Governor of Maryland:
  - until November 13:John Francis Mercer (Democratic-Republican)
  - November 13 – 15: vacant
  - starting November 15: Robert Bowie (Democratic-Republican)
- Governor of Massachusetts: Caleb Strong (Federalist)
- Governor of New Hampshire: John Taylor Gilman (Federalist)
- Governor of New Jersey: John Lambert (Democratic-Republican) (until October 29), Joseph Bloomfield (Democratic-Republican) (starting October 29)
- Governor of New York: George Clinton (Democratic-Republican)
- Governor of North Carolina: James Turner (Democratic-Republican)
- Governor of Ohio: Edward Tiffin (Democratic-Republican) (starting March 1)
- Governor of Pennsylvania: Thomas McKean (Democratic-Republican)
- Governor of Rhode Island: Arthur Fenner (Country)
- Governor of South Carolina: James Burchill Richardson (Democratic-Republican Party)
- Governor of Tennessee: Archibald Roane (Democratic-Republican) (until September 23), John Sevier (Democratic-Republican) (starting September 23)
- Governor of Vermont: Isaac Tichenor (Federalist)
- Governor of Virginia: John Page (Democratic-Republican)

=== Lieutenant governors ===
- Lieutenant Governor of Connecticut: John Treadwell (Federalist)
- Lieutenant Governor of Kentucky: Alexander Scott Bullitt (political party unknown)
- Lieutenant Governor of Massachusetts: Edward Robbins (political party unknown)
- Lieutenant Governor of New York: Jeremiah Van Rensselaer (political party unknown)
- Lieutenant Governor of Rhode Island: Samuel J. Potter (Democratic-Republican) (until month and day unknown), Paul Mumford (political party unknown) (starting month and day unknown)
- Lieutenant Governor of South Carolina: Ezekiel Pickens (Democratic-Republican)
- Lieutenant Governor of Vermont: Paul Brigham (Democratic-Republican)

== Events ==
- January 30 – Monroe and Livingston sail for Paris to discuss, and possibly buy, New Orleans; they end completing the Louisiana Purchase.
- February 24 – Marbury v. Madison: The Supreme Court of the United States establishes the principle of judicial review.
- March 1 – Ohio is admitted as the 17th U.S. state, retroactive from August 7, 1953 (see History of Ohio).
- April 30 – Louisiana Purchase is made by the United States from France.
- July 4 – The Louisiana Purchase is announced to the American people.
- October 20 – The Senate ratifies the Louisiana Purchase Treaty, doubling the size of the United States.
- November 30 – At the Cabildo building in New Orleans, Spanish representatives Governor Manuel de Salcedo and the Marqués de Casa Calvo officially transfer Louisiana (New Spain) to French representative Prefect Pierre Clément de Laussat.
- December 20 – France transfers the same land to the United States as the Sale of Louisiana.

=== Ongoing ===
- First Barbary War (1801–1805)

== Births ==
- January 19 – Sarah Helen Whitman, poet, essayist, transcendentalist, spiritualist and a romantic interest of Edgar Allan Poe (died 1878)
- February 2 – Albert Sidney Johnston, Confederate general (died 1862)
- April 30 – Jeremiah E. Cary, politician (died 1888)
- May 25 – Ralph Waldo Emerson, essayist and poet (died 1882)
- June 4 – Gabriel J. Rains, Confederate brigadier general (died 1881)
- June 25 – Sumner Lincoln Fairfield, poet and teacher (died 1844)
- July 10 – William Todd, businessman, Canadian senate nominee (died 1873)
- July 16 – Sarah Yorke Jackson, Acting First Lady of the United States (died 1887)
- July 24 – Alexander Jackson Davis, Gothic architect (died 1892)
- August 12 – John C. Young, educator and pastor (died 1857)
- August 18 – Nathan Clifford, Associate Justice of the Supreme Court of the United States (died 1881)
- August 27 – Edward Beecher, theologian (died 1895)
- September 3 – Prudence Crandall, educationist (died 1890)
- September 4 – Sarah Childress Polk, First Lady of the U.S. (died 1891)
- September 27 – Samuel Francis Du Pont, rear admiral (died 1865)
- September 29 – Mercator Cooper, sea captain (died 1872)
- October 3 – John Gorrie, physician and inventor of mechanical cooling (died 1855)
- October 21 - Solon Robinson, founder of Crown Point, Indiana (died 1880)
- October 24 – Albert Smith White, U.S. Senator from Indiana from 1839 to 1845 (died 1864)
- November 14 – Jacob Abbott, children's writer (died 1879)
- December 18 or 27 – William Allen, U.S. Senator from Ohio from 1837 to 1849 (died 1879)

== Deaths ==
- February 22 – Jacques-Donatien Le Ray de Chaumont, "Father of the American Revolution" (born 1726 in France; died in France)
- May 14 – William Smith, Episcopalian priest, educator, theologian, poet and historian (born 1727)
- June 24 – Matthew Thornton, signatory of the Declaration of Independence (born 1714 in Ireland)
- September 13 – John Barry, first commissioned U.S. naval officer (born 1745 in Ireland)
- September 27 – Frances Brett Hodgkinson, actress (born 1771 in Great Britain)
- October 2 – Samuel Adams, a Founding Father of the U.S. (born 1722)
- December 30 – Francis Lewis, signatory of the Declaration of Independence (born 1713 in Wales)
- William Verstille, portrait artist (born c. 1757)

== See also ==
- Timeline of United States history (1790–1819)
- Timeline of the Thomas Jefferson presidency § 1803
