= 1802 South Carolina gubernatorial election =

- December 8, 1802
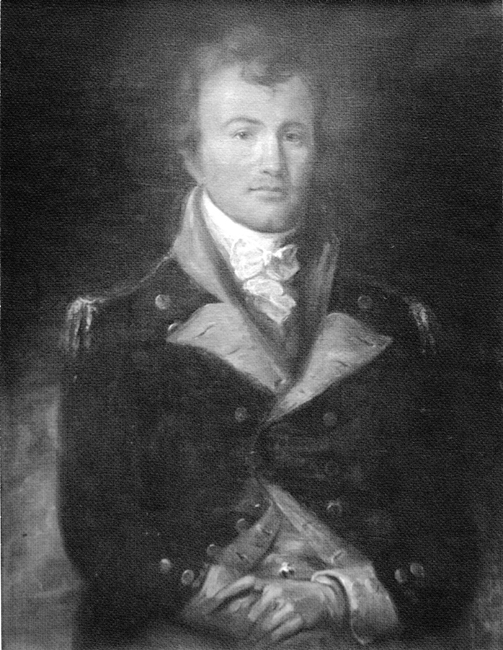

Nominee	James Burchill Richardson	Richard Winn
Party	Democratic-Republican	Democratic-Republican
Popular vote	98	32
Percentage	70.00%	22.86%
Governor before election
John Drayton
Democratic-Republican
Elected Governor
James Burchill Richardson
Democratic-Republican

The 1802 South Carolina gubernatorial election was held on December 8, 1802, in order to elect the Governor of South Carolina. Democratic-Republican candidate and member of the South Carolina House of Representatives from Clarendon District James Burchill Richardson defeated fellow Democratic-Republican candidate and incumbent Lieutenant Governor of South Carolina Richard Winn, as well as Federalist candidate, former Governor of South Carolina and 1796 presidential election Vice Presidential nominee Thomas Pinckney and Democratic-Republican candidate John Gaillard, after receiving a majority of votes in a General Assembly secret ballot vote.

== General election ==
On December 8, 1802, Democratic-Republican candidate James Burchill Richardson defeated his foremost opponent and fellow Democratic-Republican candidate Richard Winn in a General Assembly election. Richardson was sworn in as the 41st Governor of South Carolina that same day.

=== Results ===
South Carolina gubernatorial election, 1802
Party	Candidate	Votes	%
Democratic-Republican	James Burchill Richardson	98	70.00%
Democratic-Republican	Richard Winn	32	22.86%
Federalist	Thomas Pinckney	2	1.43%
Democratic-Republican	John Gaillard	1	0.71%
	Scattering	7	5.00%
Total votes		140	100.00%
Democratic-Republican hold			

== Sources ==
- Sobel, Robert (1978). Biographical directory of the governors of the United States, 1789-1978, Vol. IV. Meckler Books. ISBN 9780930466008.
