= 1880 in the United States =

- Decades: 1860s; 1870s; 1880s; 1890s; 1900s
- See also: History of the United States (1865–1918); Timeline of United States history (1860–1899); List of years in the United States

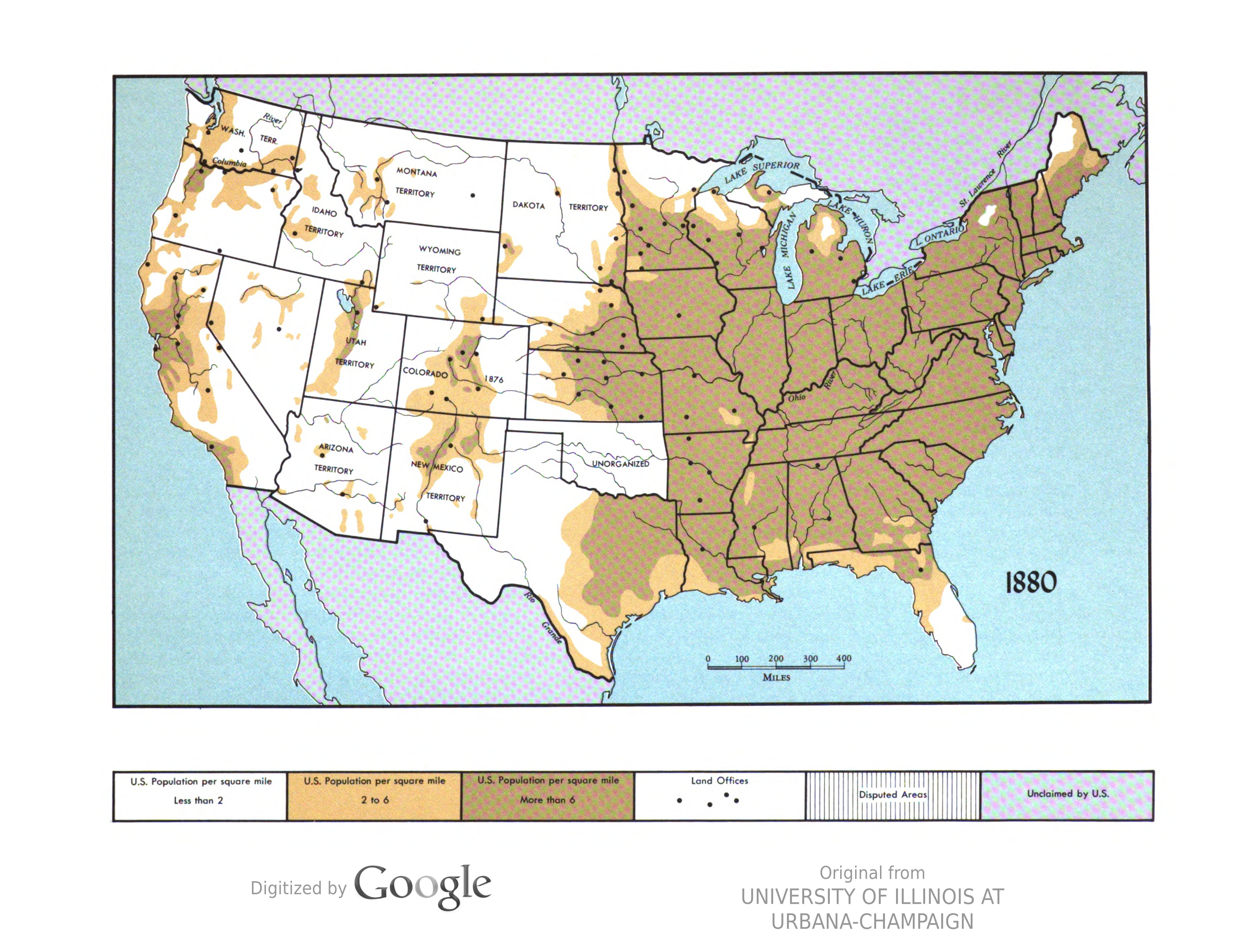
1880 in the United States (Randall D. Sale and Edwin D. Karn, American Expansion Maps, 1962)

Events from the year 1880 in the United States.

== Incumbents ==
=== Federal government ===
- President: Rutherford B. Hayes (R-Ohio)
- Vice President: William A. Wheeler (R-New York)
- Chief Justice: Morrison Waite (Ohio)
- Speaker of the House of Representatives: Samuel J. Randall (D-Pennsylvania)
- Congress: 46th

==== State governments ====
Governors and lieutenant governors

=== Governors ===
- Governor of Alabama: Rufus W. Cobb (Democratic)
- Governor of Arkansas: William Read Miller (Democratic)
- Governor of California: William Irwin (Democratic) (until January 8), George Clement Perkins (Republican) (starting January 8)
- Governor of Colorado: Frederick Walker Pitkin (Republican)
- Governor of Connecticut: Charles B. Andrews (Republican)
- Governor of Delaware: John W. Hall (Democratic)
- Governor of Florida: George Franklin Drew (Democratic)
- Governor of Georgia: Alfred H. Colquitt (Democratic)
- Governor of Illinois: Shelby Moore Cullom (Republican)
- Governor of Indiana: James D. Williams (Democratic) (until November 20), Isaac P. Gray (Democratic) (starting November 20)
- Governor of Iowa: John H. Gear (Republican)
- Governor of Kansas: John P. St. John (Republican)
- Governor of Kentucky: Luke P. Blackburn (Democratic)
- Governor of Louisiana: Francis T. Nicholls (Democratic) (until January 14), Louis A. Wiltz (Democratic) (starting January 14)
- Governor of Maine: Alonzo Garcelon (Democratic) (until January 17), Daniel F. Davis (Republican) (starting January 17)
- Governor of Maryland: John Lee Carroll (Democratic) (until January 14), William T. Hamilton (Democratic) (starting January 14)
- Governor of Massachusetts: Thomas Talbot (Republican) (until January 8), John Davis Long (Republican) (starting January 8)
- Governor of Michigan: Charles Croswell (Republican)
- Governor of Minnesota: John S. Pillsbury (Republican)
- Governor of Mississippi: John M. Stone (Democratic)
- Governor of Missouri: John Smith Phelps (Democratic)
- Governor of Nebraska: Albinus Nance (Republican)
- Governor of Nevada: John Henry Kinkead (Republican)
- Governor of New Hampshire: Natt Head (Republican)
- Governor of New Jersey: George B. McClellan (Democratic)
- Governor of New York: Alonzo B. Cornell (Republican) (starting January 1)
- Governor of North Carolina: Thomas Jordan Jarvis (Democratic)
- Governor of Ohio: Richard M. Bishop (Democratic) (until January 12), Charles Foster (Republican) (starting January 12)
- Governor of Oregon: W. W. Thayer (Democratic)
- Governor of Pennsylvania: Henry M. Hoyt (Republican)
- Governor of Rhode Island: Charles C. Van Zandt (Republican) (until May 25), Alfred H. Littlefield (Republican) (starting May 25)
- Governor of South Carolina:
  - until September 1: William Dunlap Simpson (Democratic)
  - September 1-November 30: Thomas Bothwell Jeter (Democratic)
  - starting November 30: Johnson Hagood (Democratic)
- Governor of Tennessee: Albert S. Marks (Democratic)
- Governor of Texas: Oran M. Roberts (Democratic)
- Governor of Vermont: Redfield Proctor (Republican) (until October 7), Roswell Farnham (Republican) (starting October 7)
- Governor of Virginia: Frederick W. M. Holliday (Democratic)
- Governor of West Virginia: Henry M. Mathews (Democratic)
- Governor of Wisconsin: William E. Smith (Republican)

=== Lieutenant governors ===
- Lieutenant Governor of California: James A. Johnson (Democratic) (until January 8), John Mansfield (Republican) (starting January 8)
- Lieutenant Governor of Colorado: Horace Austin Warner Tabor (Republican)
- Lieutenant Governor of Connecticut: David Gallup (Republican)
- Lieutenant Governor of Florida: vacant
- Lieutenant Governor of Illinois: Andrew Shuman (Republican)
- Lieutenant Governor of Indiana:
  - until November 2: Isaac P. Gray (Democratic)
  - November 2-20: vacant
  - starting November 20: Fredrick Vieche (Democratic)
- Lieutenant Governor of Iowa: Frank T. Campbell (Republican)
- Lieutenant Governor of Kansas: Lyman U. Humphrey (Republican)
- Lieutenant Governor of Kentucky: James E. Cantrill (Democratic)
- Lieutenant Governor of Louisiana: Louis A. Wiltz (Democratic) (until January 14), Samuel D. McEnery (Democratic) (starting January 14)
- Lieutenant Governor of Massachusetts: John D. Long (Republican) (until January 8), Byron Weston (Republican) (starting January 8)
- Lieutenant Governor of Michigan: Alonzo Sessions (Republican)
- Lieutenant Governor of Minnesota: James Wakefield (Republican) (until January 10), Charles A. Gilman (Republican) (starting January 10)
- Lieutenant Governor of Mississippi: William H. Sims (Democratic)
- Lieutenant Governor of Missouri: Henry Clay Brockmeyer (Democratic)
- Lieutenant Governor of Nebraska: Edmund C. Carns (Republican)
- Lieutenant Governor of Nevada: Jewett W. Adams (Democratic)
- Lieutenant Governor of New York: George Gilbert Hoskins (Republican) (starting January 1)
- Lieutenant Governor of North Carolina: vacant
- Lieutenant Governor of Ohio: Jabez W. Fitch (Democratic) (until January 12), Andrew Hickenlooper (Republican) (starting month and day unknown)
- Lieutenant Governor of Pennsylvania: Charles Warren Stone (Republican)
- Lieutenant Governor of Rhode Island: Albert Howard (political party unknown) (until May 25), Henry Fay (political party unknown) (starting May 25)
- Lieutenant Governor of South Carolina: vacant (until November 30), John D. Kennedy (Democratic) (starting November 30)
- Lieutenant Governor of Tennessee: John R. Neal (Democratic) (starting month and day unknown)
- Lieutenant Governor of Texas: Joseph Draper Sayers (Democratic)
- Lieutenant Governor of Vermont: Eben Pomeroy Colton (Republican) (until October 7), John L. Barstow (Republican) (starting October 7)
- Lieutenant Governor of Virginia: James A. Walker (Democratic)
- Lieutenant Governor of Wisconsin: James M. Bingham (Republican)

== Events ==
November 2: James Garfield elected president

- February – The journal Science is first published, with financial backing from Thomas Edison.
- February 2 – The first electric streetlight is installed in Wabash, Indiana.
- March 31 – Wabash, Indiana becomes the first electrically lighted city in the world.
- May – Woman's Institute of Yonkers was established; it is Yonkers' oldest social service agency
- May 11 – Mussel Slough Tragedy: A land dispute between the Southern Pacific Railroad and settlers in Hanford, California, turns deadly when a gun battle breaks out, leaving 7 dead.
- May 13 – In Menlo Park, New Jersey, Thomas Edison performs the first test of his electric railway.
- May 30 – League of American Wheelmen is founded in Newport, Rhode Island.
- June 1 – United States Census is 50,155,783. More than 100,000 Chinese men and 3,000 Chinese women are living in the western United States.
- August 1 – Rufus W. Cobb is reelected the 25th governor of Alabama defeating James Madison Pickens.
- September 30 – Amateur astronomer Henry Draper takes the first ever photograph of the Orion Nebula.
- October 6 – The University of Southern California opens its doors to 53 students and 10 faculty.
- October 15 – The first blizzard mentioned in Laura Ingalls Wilder's The Long Winter sweeps over the prairie in Dakota Territory.
- November 2 – 1880 United States presidential election: James Garfield defeats Winfield S. Hancock.
- November 4 – The first cash register is patented by James and John Ritty of Dayton, Ohio.
- November 22 – Vaudeville actress Lillian Russell makes her debut at Tony Pastor's Theatre in New York City.

=== Undated ===
- The Department of Scientific Temperance Instruction of the Women's Christian Temperance Union is established.
- Charles Wesley Emerson founds the Boston Conservatory of Elocution, Oratory, and Dramatic Art, predecessor of Emerson College.

=== Ongoing ===
- Gilded Age (1869–c. 1896)

== Sport ==
- September 15 – The Chicago White Stockings clinch their Second National League pennant with a 5–2 win over the Cincinnati Reds.

== Births ==
=== January–June ===
- January 6 – Tom Mix, Western film actor (d. 1940)
- January 14 – Joseph Warren Beach, poet, novelist, critic and literary scholar (d. 1957)
- January 20 – Walter W. Bacon, accountant and politician, 60th Governor of Delaware (d. 1962)
- January 26
  - Sylvia Ashton, silent film actress (d. 1940)
  - Douglas MacArthur, general (d. 1964)
- January 28 – Dorothy Donnelly, actress and lyricist (d. 1928)
- January 29 – W. C. Fields, born William Claude Dukenfield, comic actor (d. 1946)
- February – Maud E. Craig Sampson Williams, African American suffragist (d. 1958)
- February 12 – John L. Lewis, labor union leader (d. 1969)
- February 14 – Frederick J. Horne, admiral (d. 1959)
- February 16 – Frank Burke, baseball player (d. 1946)
- February 19 – Arthur Shepherd, composer (d. 1958)
- February 2 – Angelina Weld Grimke, African American lesbian journalist and poet (d. 1958)
- March 4 – Channing Pollock, playwright and critic (d. 1946)
- March 10 – Broncho Billy Anderson, Western film actor (d. 1971)
- March 11 – Harry H. Laughlin, eugenicist (d. 1943)
- March 28 – Louis Wolheim, character actor (d. 1931)
- April 18 – Sam Crawford, baseball player (d. 1968)
- May 6 – William Joseph Simmons, founder of the second Ku Klux Klan in 1915 (d. 1945)
- June 4 – Clara Blandick, actress (d. 1962)
- June 9 – William S. Pye, admiral (d. 1959)
- June 11 – Jeannette Pickering Rankin, first woman elected to U.S. Congress (d. 1973)
- June 17 – Carl Van Vechten, writer and photographer (d. 1964)
- June 21 – Arnold Gesell, developmental psychologist (d. 1961)
- June 24 – Oswald Veblen, mathematician (d. 1960)
- June 26 – Mitchell Lewis, actor (d. 1956)
- June 27 – Helen Keller, campaigner for the deaf and blind (d. 1968)

=== July–December ===
- July 10 – Greye La Spina, born Fanny Greye Bragg, fiction writer (d. 1969)
- July 12 – Tod Browning, motion picture director, horror film pioneer (d. 1962)
- July 26 – Jean Clemens, youngest child of Mark Twain (d. 1909)
- July 30 – Robert R. McCormick, newspaper publisher (d. 1955)
- August 2 – Arthur Dove, abstract painter (d. 1946)
- August 10
  - Robert L. Thornton, businessman, philanthropist and mayor of Dallas, Texas (d. 1964)
  - Catherine Evans Whitener, textile manufacturer (d. 1964)
- August 12 – Christy Mathewson, baseball player (d. 1925)
- August 22 – George Herriman, cartoonist (d. 1944)
- September 14 – Archie Hahn, sprinter (d. 1955)
- September 12 – H. L. Mencken, journalist (d. 1956)
- September 24 – Sarah Knauss, supercentenarian, all-time longest lived American (d. 1999)
- October 4 – Damon Runyon, writer (d. 1946)
- October 31 – A. J. Rosier, politician (d. 1932)
- November 1 – Grantland Rice, sportswriter (d. 1954)
- November 10 – Jacob Epstein, sculptor (d. 1959 in the United Kingdom)
- November 12 – Harold Rainsford Stark, admiral (d. 1972)
- December 4 – Garfield Wood, motorboat racer (d. 1971)
- December 24 – Johnny Gruelle, cartoonist and children's book author (d. 1938)
- December 31 – George Marshall, United States Secretary of State, recipient of the Nobel Peace Prize in 1953 (d. 1959)

=== Undated ===
- Eliza Grant, African American midwife
- Aunt Molly Jackson, folk singer and union activist (d. 1960)

== Deaths ==
- January 1 – Morris Ketchum, financier (b. 1796)
- January 8 – "Emperor Norton", eccentric (b. c.1818 in the United Kingdom)
- January 12 – Ellen Lewis Herndon Arthur, wife of future President Chester A. Arthur (b. 1837)
- January 19 – James Westcott, U.S. Senator from Florida from 1845 to 1849, died in Montréal, Québec, Canada (b. 1802)
- February 14 – Samuel G. Arnold, U.S. Senator from Rhode Island from 1862 to 1863 (b. 1821)
- February 17 – James Lenox, bibliophile (b. 1800)
- May 4 – Edward Clark, Confederate Governor of Texas (b. 1815)
- May 8 – Jones Very, Transcendentalist essayist, poet, clergyman and mystic (born 1813)
- June 12 – Albert G. Brown, U.S. Senator from Mississippi from 1854 to 1861 (b. 1813)
- June 13 – James A. Bayard Jr., U.S. Senator from Delaware from 1851 to 1864 (b. 1799)
- June 17 – James B. Howell, U.S. Senator from Iowa from 1870 to 1871 (b. 1816)
- June 28 – Texas Jack Omohundro, frontier scout, actor and cowboy (b. 1846)
- July 7 – Lydia Maria Child, novelist and abolitionist (b. 1802)
- July 21 – Hiram Walden, politician (b. 1800)
- August 9 – William Bigler, U.S. Senator from Pennsylvania from 1856 to 1861 (born 1814)
- August 16 – Herschel Vespasian Johnson, United States Senator from Georgia from 1863 until 1865. (born 1812)
- August 19 – James Seddon, 4th Confederate States Secretary of War (born 1815)
- August 24 – Ouray, Ute leader (b. c. 1833)
- September 19 – Lafayette S. Foster, U.S. Senator from Connecticut from 1855 to 1867 (born 1806)
- October – Victorio, Chiricahua Apache chief (b. c.1825)
- November 3 - Solon Robinson, founder of Crown Point, Indiana (born 1803)
- November 9 – Edwin Drake, first American to successfully drill for oil (b. 1819)
- November 11 – Lucretia Mott, abolitionist and women's rights activist (born 1793)
- December 20 – Gaspar Tochman, lawyer and Confederate colonel (b. 1797 in Poland)
- December 30 – Epes Sargent, editor, poet and playwright (b. 1813)

== See also ==
- Timeline of United States history (1860–1899)
