= 1804 in the United States =

- Decades: 1780s; 1790s; 1800s; 1810s; 1820s
- See also: History of the United States (1789–1849); Timeline of United States history (1790–1819); List of years in the United States

Bradley's map of the United States (1804)

Events from the year 1804 in the United States.

== Incumbents ==
=== Federal government ===
- President: Thomas Jefferson (DR-Virginia)
- Vice President: Aaron Burr (DR-New York)
- Chief Justice: John Marshall (Virginia)
- Speaker of the House of Representatives: Nathaniel Macon (DR-North Carolina)
- Congress: 8th

==== State governments ====
Governors and lieutenant governor

=== Governors ===
- Governor of Connecticut: Jonathan Trumbull Jr. (Federalist)
- Governor of Delaware: David Hall (Democratic-Republican
- Governor of Georgia: John Milledge (Democratic-Republican)
- Governor of Kentucky: James Garrard (Democratic-Republican) (until September 5), Christopher Greenup (Democratic-Republican) (starting September 5)
- Governor of Maryland: Robert Bowie (Democratic-Republican)
- Governor of Massachusetts: Caleb Strong (Federalist)
- Governor of New Hampshire: John Taylor Gilman (Federalist)
- Governor of New Jersey: Joseph Bloomfield (Democratic-Republican)
- Governor of New York: George Clinton (Democratic-Republican) (until end of June 30), Morgan Lewis (Democratic-Republican) (starting July 1)
- Governor of North Carolina: James Turner (Democratic-Republican)
- Governor of Ohio: Edward Tiffin (Democratic-Republican)
- Governor of Pennsylvania: Thomas McKean (Democratic-Republican)
- Governor of Rhode Island: Arthur Fenner (Country)
- Governor of South Carolina: James Burchill Richardson (Democratic-Republican) (until December 7), Paul Hamilton (Democratic-Republican) (starting December 7)
- Governor of Tennessee: John Sevier (Democratic-Republican)
- Governor of Vermont: Isaac Tichenor (Federalist)
- Governor of Virginia: John Page (Democratic-Republican)

=== Lieutenant governors ===
- Lieutenant Governor of Connecticut: John Treadwell (Federalist)
- Lieutenant Governor of Kentucky:
  - until September 5: Alexander Scott Bullitt (political party unknown)
  - September 5 – December 31: John Caldwell (political party unknown)
  - starting December 31: vacant
- Lieutenant Governor of Massachusetts: Edward Robbins (political party unknown)
- Lieutenant Governor of New York: Jeremiah Van Rensselaer (political party unknown) (until end of June 30), John Broome (Democratic-Republican) (starting July 1)
- Lieutenant Governor of Rhode Island: Paul Mumford (political party unknown)
- Lieutenant Governor of South Carolina: Ezekiel Pickens (Democratic-Republican) (until December 7), Thomas Sumter, Jr. (Democratic-Republican) (starting December 7)
- Lieutenant Governor of Vermont: Paul Brigham (Democratic-Republican)

== Events ==
=== January–March ===
- February 15 – New Jersey becomes the last northern state to abolish slavery.
- February 16 – First Barbary War: Stephen Decatur leads a raid to burn the pirate-held frigate Philadelphia.
- February 18 – Ohio University is chartered by the Ohio General Assembly.
- March 10 – Last formalities of the Louisiana Purchase; in St. Louis, a ceremony is conducted to transfer ownership from France to the United States.
- March 26 – Orleans Territory is created.

=== April–June ===
- May 14 – The Lewis and Clark Expedition departs from Camp Dubois near St. Louis and begins their journey by traveling up the Missouri River.
- June 15 – The Twelfth Amendment to the United States Constitution is ratified by New Hampshire, and arguably becomes effective (subsequently vetoed by the Governor of New Hampshire).

=== July–September ===
- July 11 – Burr–Hamilton duel: Alexander Hamilton is shot during a duel with Aaron Burr and dies the next day.
- July 27 – The Twelfth Amendment to the United States Constitution is ratified by Tennessee, removing doubt surrounding adoption.
- August 20 – Lewis and Clark Expedition: The Corps of Discovery, whose purpose is to explore the Louisiana Purchase, suffers its only death when Sergeant Charles Floyd dies, apparently from acute appendicitis.
- August 26 – Lewis and Clark Expedition: The first election west of the Mississippi River is held. Patrick Gass is elected Sergeant replacing Charles Floyd.

=== October–December ===
- October 1 – Orleans Territory is effective.
- October 24 – Lewis and Clark Expedition: The Expedition encounter the Mandan and Hidatsa tribes, for the first time, near present-day Washburn, North Dakota. They decide to build Fort Mandan their winter quarters near the main village.
- November 3 – The Treaty of St. Louis (1804) is signed by Quashquame and William Henry Harrison; controversy surrounding the treaty eventually causes the Sauks to ally with the British during the War of 1812 and is the main cause of the Black Hawk War of 1832.
- November 30 – The Democratic-Republican-controlled United States Senate begin an impeachment trial against Federalist-partisan Supreme Court of the United States Justice Samuel Chase (he was charged with political bias but was acquitted by the United States Senate of all charges on March 1, 1805).
- December 3 – Thomas Jefferson defeats Charles C. Pinckney in the 1804 United States presidential election.

=== Ongoing ===
- First Barbary War (1801–1805)
- Lewis and Clark Expedition (1804-1806)

== Births ==
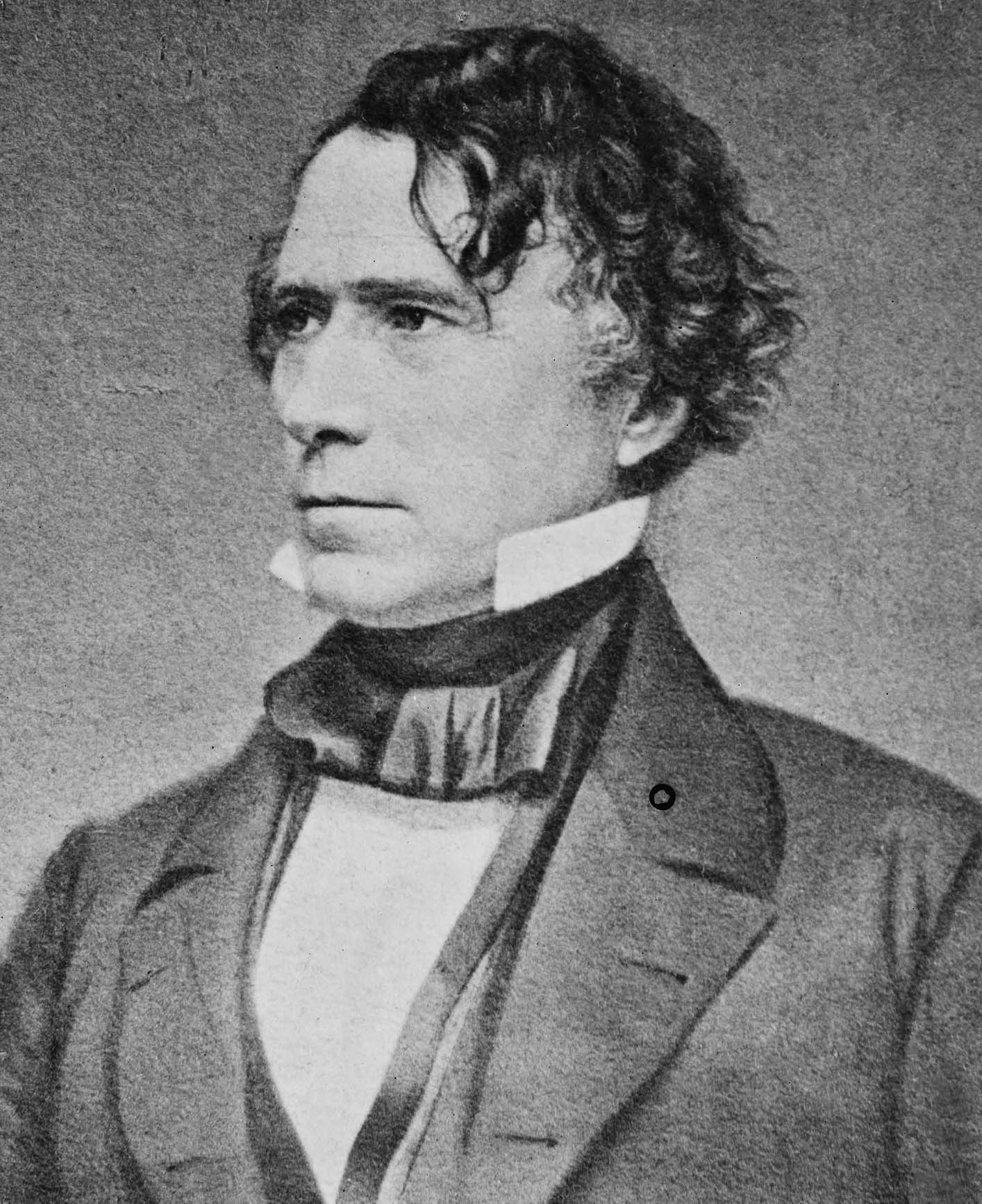
Franklin Pierce

- January 21 – Eliza R. Snow, poet (died 1887)
- February 7 – John Deere, inventor and industrialist (died 1886)
- March 8 – Alvan Clark, astronomer, telescope maker, portrait painter and engraver (died 1887)
- March 17 – Jim Bridger, trapper and explorer (died 1881)
- March 31 – Josiah C. Nott, physician, surgeon and racist theorist (died 1873)
- April 12 – George Wallace Jones, U.S. Senator from Iowa from 1848 to 1859 (died 1896)
- April 26 – Charles Goodyear, politician (died 1876)
- May 16 – Elizabeth Peabody, Transcendental activist and educator (died 1894)
- May 28 – William Alfred Buckingham, U.S. Senator from Connecticut from 1869 to 1875 (died 1875)
- June 24 – Willard Richards, religious leader (died 1854)
- July 4
  - Charles G. Atherton, U.S. Senator from New Hampshire from 1843 to 1849 and in 1853 (died 1853)
  - Nathaniel Hawthorne, Dark romantic novelist (died 1864)
- September 4 – Thomas Ustick Walter, architect (died 1887)
- September 5 – William Alexander Graham, U.S. Senator from North Carolina from 1840 to 1843, Confederate States Senator from 1864 to 1865, 30th Governor of North Carolina from 1845 to 1849 and U.S. Secretary of the Navy from 1850 to 1852 (died 1875)
- September 16 – Squire Whipple, civil engineer (died 1888)
- September 27 – Anna McNeill Whistler, "Whistler's Mother" (died 1881)
- September 28 – Alpheus Felch, 5th Governor of Michigan from 1846 to 1847 and U.S. Senator from Michigan from 1847 to 1853 (died 1896)
- October 4 – John Scott Harrison, member of the U.S. House of Representatives from Ohio, son of William Henry Harrison, father of Benjamin Harrison (died 1878)
- November 13 – James Bell, U.S. Senator from New Hampshire from 1855 to 1857 (died 1857)
- November 19 – Alexandre Mouton, U.S. Senator from Louisiana from 1843 to 1846 (died 1885)
- November 23 – Franklin Pierce, 14th president of the United States from 1853 to 1857 (died 1869)
- December 19 – Fitz Henry Lane, luminist painter (died 1865)
- December 24 – Charles Magill Conrad, U.S. Senator from Louisiana from 1842 to 1843 (died 1878)
- Osceola, born Billy Powell, a Seminole leader (died 1838)

== Deaths ==
- January 11 – James Tytler, editor of Encyclopædia Britannica (born 1745 in Scotland)
- February 2 – George Walton, signer of the Declaration of Independence (born 1749)
- July 12 – Alexander Hamilton, a Founding Father of the United States, founder of the nation's financial system, founder of the Federalist Party, statesman (killed in a duel with Aaron Burr) (born 1755/1757, exact date is unknown)
- August 20 – Charles Floyd, explorer, only fatality of the Lewis and Clark Expedition (born 1782)
- September 4 – Richard Somers, naval officer (killed in battle) (born 1778/9)
- September 29 – Michael Hillegas, 1st Treasurer of the United States (born 1729)
- November 18 – Philip Schuyler, general in the American Revolution, United States Senator from New York, father of wife of Alexander Hamilton, Elizabeth Schuyler Hamilton (born 1733)
- Abraham Wood, composer (born 1752)

== See also ==
- Timeline of the Lewis and Clark Expedition
- Timeline of United States history (1790–1819)
- Timeline of the Thomas Jefferson presidency § 1804
