= 1805 in the United States =

- Decades: 1780s; 1790s; 1800s; 1810s; 1820s
- See also: History of the United States (1789–1849); Timeline of United States history (1790–1819); List of years in the United States

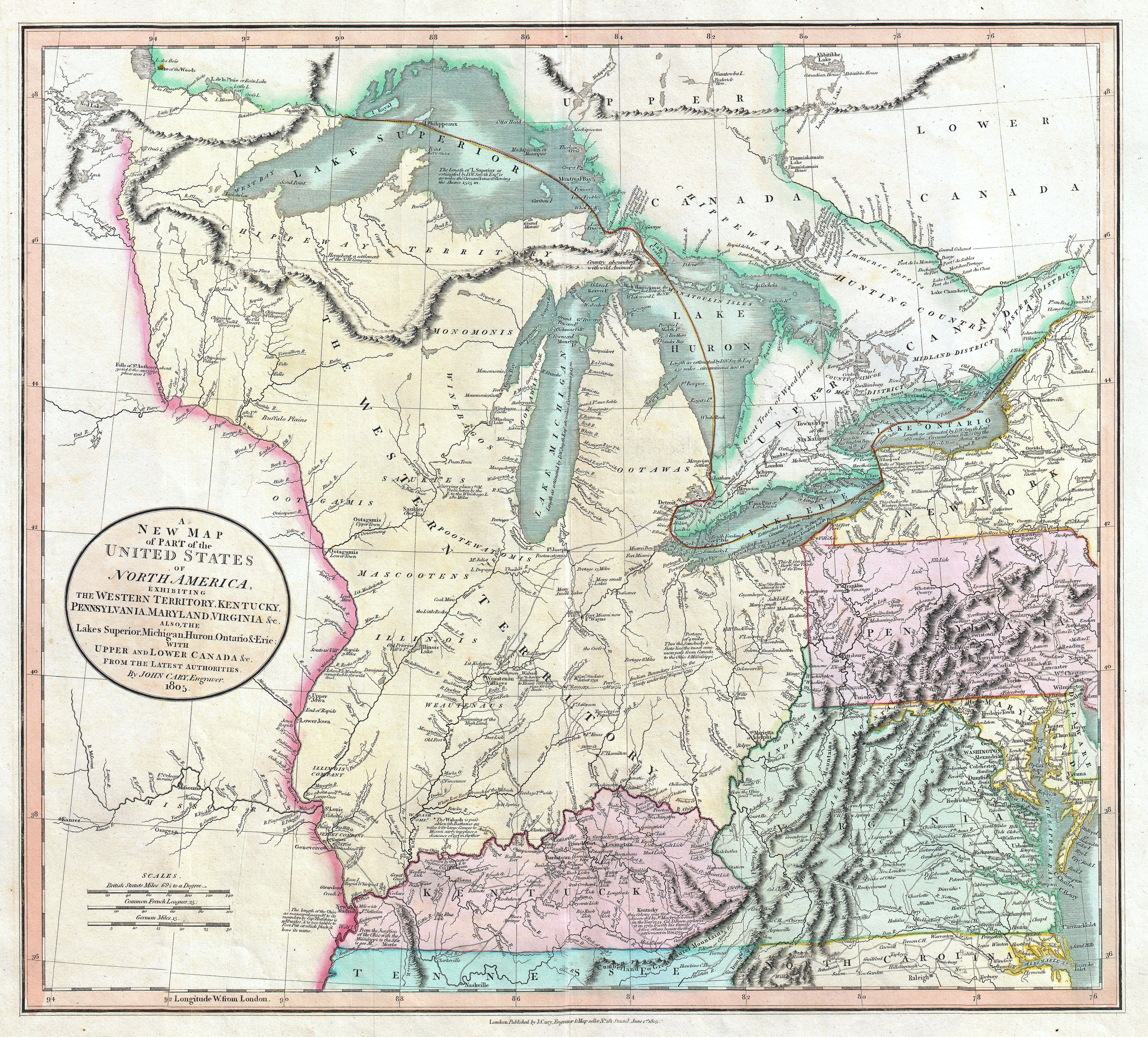
1805 Cary map of the Great Lakes and Western Territory (Kentucky, Virginia, Ohio, etc.)

Events from the year 1805 in the United States.

== Incumbents ==
=== Federal government ===
- President: Thomas Jefferson (DR-Virginia)
- Vice President:

Aaron Burr (DR-New York) (until March 4)
George Clinton (DR-New York) (starting March 4)

- Chief Justice: John Marshall (Virginia)
- Speaker of the House of Representatives: Nathaniel Macon (DR-North Carolina)
- Congress: 8th (until March 4), 9th (starting March 4)

==== State governments ====
Governors and lieutenant governors

=== Governors ===
- Governor of Connecticut: Jonathan Trumbull Jr. (Federalist)
- Governor of Delaware: David Hall (Democratic-Republican) (until January 15), Nathaniel Mitchell (Federalist) (starting January 15)
- Governor of Georgia: John Milledge (Democratic-Republican)
- Governor of Kentucky: Christopher Greenup (Democratic-Republican)
- Governor of Maryland: Robert Bowie (Democratic-Republican)
- Governor of Massachusetts: Caleb Strong (Federalist)
- Governor of New Hampshire: John Taylor Gilman (Federalist) (until June 6), John Langdon (Democratic-Republican) (starting June 6)
- Governor of New Jersey: Joseph Bloomfield (Democratic-Republican)
- Governor of New York: Morgan Lewis (Democratic-Republican)
- Governor of North Carolina: James Turner (Democratic-Republican) (until December 10), Nathaniel Alexander (Democratic-Republican) (starting December 10)
- Governor of Ohio: Edward Tiffin (Democratic-Republican)
- Governor of Pennsylvania: Thomas McKean (Democratic-Republican)
- Governor of Rhode Island: Arthur Fenner (Country) (until October 15), Henry Smith (Country) (starting October 15)
- Governor of South Carolina: Paul Hamilton (Democratic-Republican)
- Governor of Tennessee: John Sevier (Democratic-Republican)
- Governor of Vermont: Isaac Tichenor (Democratic-Republican)
- Governor of Virginia: John Page (Democratic-Republican) (until December 7), William H. Cabell (Democratic-Republican) (starting December 7)

=== Lieutenant governors ===
- Lieutenant Governor of Connecticut: John Treadwell (Federalist)
- Lieutenant Governor of Kentucky: vacant
- Lieutenant Governor of Massachusetts: Edward Robbins (political party unknown)
- Lieutenant Governor of New York: John Broome (Democratic-Republican)
- Lieutenant Governor of Rhode Island: Paul Mumford (political party unknown) (until July 20), vacant (starting July 20)
- Lieutenant Governor of South Carolina: Thomas Sumter, Jr. (Democratic-Republican)
- Lieutenant Governor of Vermont: Paul Brigham (Democratic-Republican)

== Events ==
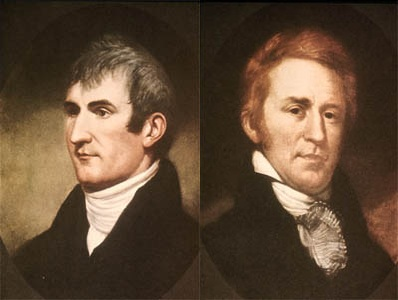
The Lewis and Clark Expedition sights the Great Falls of the Missouri River and the Pacific Ocean.

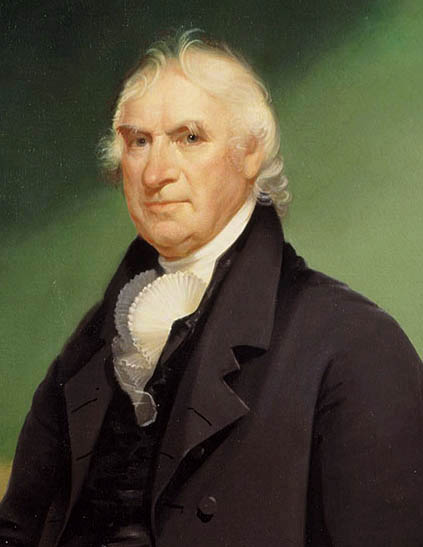
George Clinton becomes the fourth U.S. vice president

- January 11 – Michigan Territory is created.
- February 11 – Jean Baptiste Charbonneau, son of Sacagawea, is born with Meriwether Lewis aiding in the baby's delivery.
- February 15 – Harmony Society formally established in the U.S. at Harmony, Pennsylvania.
- March 1 – Justice Samuel Chase is acquitted of impeachment charges by the U.S. Senate.
- March 3 – Louisiana Territory is created.
- March 4 – Thomas Jefferson is sworn in for a second term as President of the United States, and George Clinton is sworn in as Vice President of the United States.
- April 7 – The Lewis and Clark Expedition departs Fort Mandan, beginning their journey to the Pacific Ocean.
- April 27 – Battle of Derne: United States Marines and Berbers attack the Tripolitan city of Derna (The "Shores of Tripoli").
- June 4 – The First Barbary War ends between Tripoli and the United States of America.
- June 11 – Detroit burns to the ground; most of the city is destroyed.
- June 13 – Lewis and Clark Expedition: Scouting ahead of the expedition, Meriwether Lewis and four companions sight the Great Falls of the Missouri River, confirming they are heading in the right direction.
- June 30 – Michigan Territory is effective.
- July 4 – Louisiana Territory is effective.
- October 18 – Lewis and Clark Expedition: William Clark sights Mount Hood through the fog, some 45 miles (72 km) away.
- November 7 – The Lewis and Clark Expedition arrives at the Pacific Ocean.

=== Undated ===
- Boston Gleaning Circle, a female literary organization, is established.

=== Ongoing ===
- First Barbary War (1801–1805)
- Lewis and Clark Expedition (1804–1806)

== Births ==
- January 8 – Orson Hyde, religious leader (died 1878)
- February 11 – Jean Baptiste Charbonneau, son of Sacagawea, explorer, guide, fur trapper, trader and military scout (died 1866)
- February 18 – Louis M. Goldsborough, admiral (died 1877)
- March 23 – Sears Cook Walker, mathematician and astronomer (died 1853)
- June 14 – Robert Anderson, United States Army officer during the American Civil War (died 1871 in France)
- June 15 – William B. Ogden, Chicago politician and railroad executive (died 1877)
- July 10 – Jacob M. Howard, U.S. Senator from Michigan from 1862 to 1871 (died 1871)
- September 6 – Horatio Greenough, sculptor (died 1852)
- September 19 – John Stevens Cabot Abbott, historian, pastor and pedagogical writer (died 1877)
- October 9 – William M. Gwin, U.S. Senator from California from 1850 to 1855 and from 1857 to 1861 (died 1885)
- November 28 – John Lloyd Stephens, traveler, diplomat and Mayanist archaeologist (died 1852)
- December 2 – Cicero Price, commodore (died 1888)
- December 10 – William Lloyd Garrison, abolitionist (died 1879)
- December 12 – Henry Wells, businessman, founder of Wells Fargo (died 1878)
- December 23 – Joseph Smith, religious leader, founder of the Church of Jesus Christ of Latter-day Saints (died 1844)

== Deaths ==
- January 7 – Ebenezer Sproat, Continental Army officer, pioneer in the Ohio Country (born 1752)
- January 9 – Noble Wimberly Jones, physician and delegate to the Continental Congress in 1781 and 1782 (born c. 1723)
- February 4 – John Sloss Hobart, jurist and politician (born 1738)
- June 17 – John Ames, captain in the American Revolutionary War (born 1738)
- August 28 – Christopher Gadsden, statesman (born 1724)
- September 27 – William Moultrie, general (born 1730)
- November – Robert Alexander, Maryland politician (born c. 1740)

== See also ==
- Timeline of the Lewis and Clark Expedition
- Timeline of United States history (1790–1819)
- Timeline of the Thomas Jefferson presidency § 1805
