= 1806 in the United States =

- Decades: 1780s; 1790s; 1800s; 1810s; 1820s
- See also: History of the United States (1789–1849); Timeline of United States history (1790–1819); List of years in the United States

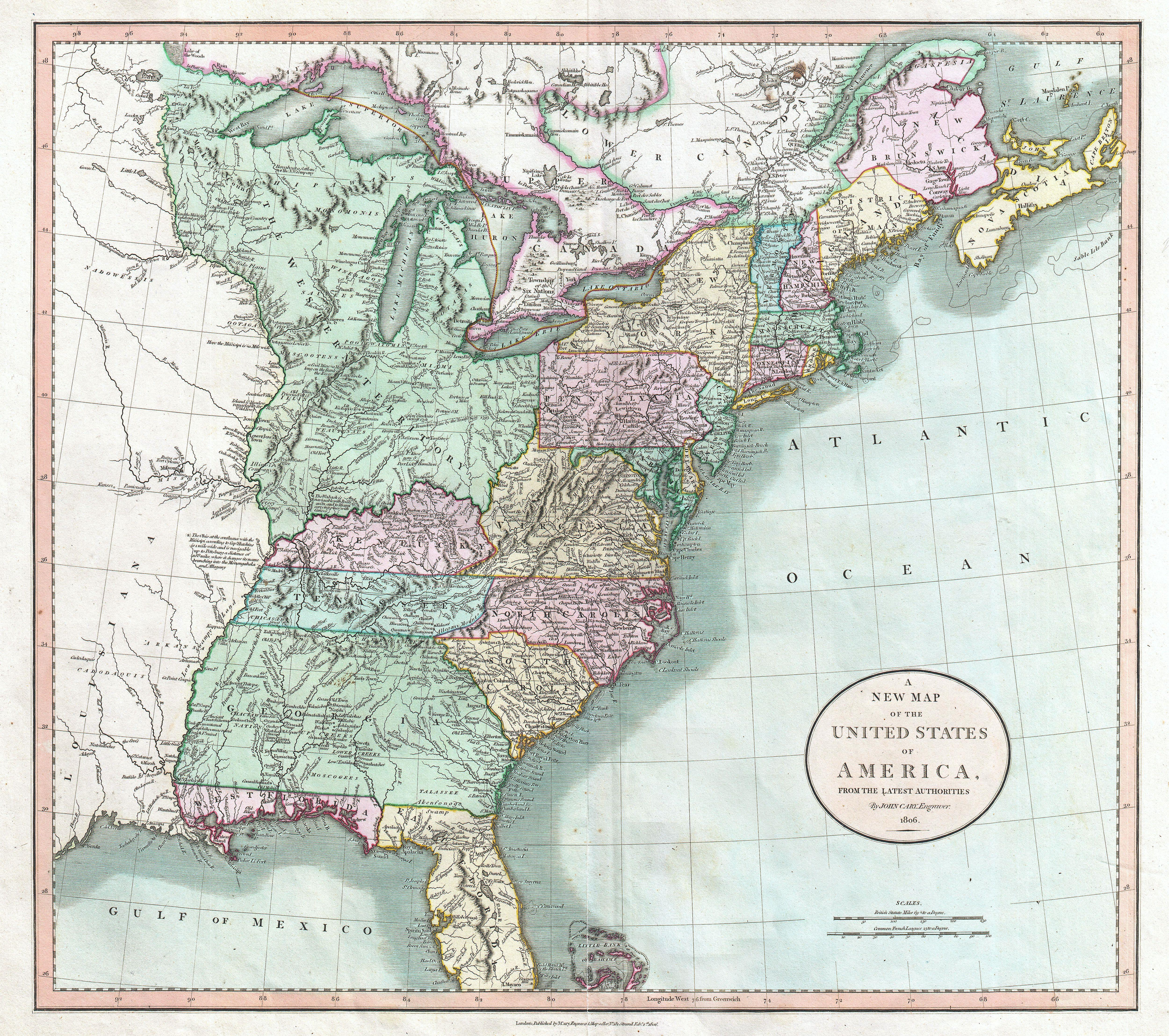
1806 John Cary map of the United States (Geographicus Rare Antique Maps)

Events from the year 1806 in the United States.

== Incumbents ==
=== Federal government ===
- President: Thomas Jefferson (DR-Virginia )
- Vice President: George Clinton (DR-New York)
- Chief Justice: John Marshall (Virginia)
- Speaker of the House of Representatives: Nathaniel Macon (DR-North Carolina)
- Congress: 9th

==== State governments ====
Governors and lieutenant governors

=== Governors ===
- Governor of Connecticut: Jonathan Trumbull, Jr. (Federalist)
- Governor of Delaware: Nathaniel Mitchell (Federalist)
- Governor of Georgia: John Milledge (Democratic-Republican) (until September 23), Jared Irwin (Democratic-Republican) (starting September 23)
- Governor of Kentucky: Christopher Greenup (Democratic-Republican)
- Governor of Maryland:
  - until November 10: Robert Bowie (Democratic-Republican)
  - November 10-12: vacant
  - starting November 12: Robert Wright (Democratic-Republican)
- Governor of Massachusetts: Caleb Strong (Federalist)
- Governor of New Hampshire: John Langdon (Democratic-Republican)
- Governor of New Jersey: Joseph Bloomfield (Democratic-Republican)
- Governor of New York: Morgan Lewis (Democratic-Republican)
- Governor of North Carolina: Nathaniel Alexander (Democratic-Republican)
- Governor of Ohio: Edward Tiffin (Democratic-Republican)
- Governor of Pennsylvania: Thomas McKean (Democratic-Republican)
- Governor of Rhode Island: Henry Smith (Country) (until May 7), Isaac Wilbour (Country) (starting May 7)
- Governor of South Carolina: Paul Hamilton (Democratic-Republican) (until December 9), Charles Pinckney (Democratic-Republican) (starting December 9)
- Governor of Tennessee: John Sevier (Democratic-Republican)
- Governor of Vermont: Isaac Tichenor (Federalist)
- Governor of Virginia: William H. Cabell (Democratic-Republican)

=== Lieutenant governors ===
- Lieutenant Governor of Connecticut: John Treadwell (Federalist)
- Lieutenant Governor of Kentucky: vacant (until month and day unknown), Thomas Posey (political party unknown) (starting month and day unknown)
- Lieutenant Governor of Massachusetts: Edward Robbins (political party unknown) (until month and day unknown), vacant (starting month and day unknown)
- Lieutenant Governor of New York: John Broome (Democratic-Republican)
- Lieutenant Governor of Rhode Island: vacant (until May 7), Isaac Wilbour (Democratic-Republican) (starting May 7)
- Lieutenant Governor of South Carolina: Thomas Sumter, Jr. (Democratic-Republican) (until December 9), John Hopkins (Democratic-Republican) (starting December 9)
- Lieutenant Governor of Vermont: Paul Brigham (Democratic-Republican)

== Events ==
- February 25 – Newspapers in Charleston, South Carolina advertise 2,058 slaves recently trafficked from Africa's Congo River basin, Gold Coast (present-day Ghana), and Windward Coast (present-day Sierra Leone, Liberia, and Ivory Coast).
- March 23 – The Lewis and Clark Expedition and their Corps of Discovery, having reached the Pacific Ocean after traveling through the Louisiana Purchase, begins its journey home.
- March 28 – Washington College (modern-day Washington & Jefferson College) is chartered by the Pennsylvania General Assembly.
- March 29 – Construction is authorized of the National Road (the first United States federal highway).
- April 18 – The U.S. Congress passes the Non-importation Act in an attempt to coerce Great Britain to suspend its impressment of American sailors and to respect American sovereignty and neutrality on the high seas.
- May 25 – George Sweeney allegedly poisons the household of his great-uncle, Founding Father George Wythe, in order to accelerate his inheritance.
- May 30 – Future President Andrew Jackson fights his second duel, killing Charles Dickinson.
- July 4 – Ship The Irish Rover sets sail from the Cove of Cork, Ireland for New York.
- July 7 – Cornerstone laid for America's First Cathedral, now known as the Baltimore Basilica. Architect: Benjamin Latrobe.
- July 15 – Pike Expedition: Near St. Louis, Missouri, United States Army Lieutenant Zebulon Pike leads an expedition from Fort Bellefontaine to explore the Louisiana Purchase.
- August 14 – The Lewis and Clark Expedition re-visit the Mandan Indians while making its return trip to St. Louis.
- September 23 – The Lewis and Clark Expedition reaches St. Louis, Missouri, ending a successful exploration of the Louisiana Territory and the Pacific Northwest.
- November 15 – Pike Expedition: During his second exploratory expedition, Lieutenant Zebulon Pike sees a distant mountain peak while near the Colorado foothills of the Rocky Mountains which is later named Pikes Peak in his honor.

=== Undated ===
- Noah Webster publishes A Compendious Dictionary of the English Language, his first American English dictionary.
- Parson Weems publishes a 2nd edition of his The Life of George Washington, with curious anecdotes laudable to himself and exemplary to his countrymen, first including the story of the young Washington and the cherry-tree.

=== Ongoing ===
- Lewis and Clark Expedition (1803-1806)

== Births ==
- January 28 – Lewis W. Green, Presbyterian minister and educator (died 1863)
- February 10 – Orville Hickman Browning, U.S. Senator from Illinois from 1866 to 1869 (died 1881)
- February 25 – Emma Catherine Embury, author and poet (died 1863)
- March 4
  - George Bradburn, abolitionist and women's rights advocate (died 1880)
  - Ephraim Wales Bull, farmer, creator of the Concord grape (died 1895)
- March 12 – Jane Pierce, First Lady of the United States (died 1863)
- May 23 – Oliver Filley, businessman, abolitionist and 16th mayor of St. Louis from 1858 to 1861 (died 1881)
- June 18 – Abijah Gilbert, U.S. Senator from Florida from 1869 to 1875 (died 1881)
- September 12 – Andrew Hull Foote, naval officer in the American Civil War (died 1863)
- October 3 – Oliver Cowdery, religious leader (died 1850)
- November 22 – Lafayette S. Foster, U.S. Senator from Connecticut from 1855 to 1867 (died 1880)
- December 12 – Stand Watie, Cherokee Nation leader and Confederate General in the American Civil War (died 1871)

== Deaths ==
- February 20 – Lachlan McIntosh, military and political leader (born 1725)
- April 10 – Horatio Gates, British soldier who served as an American general in the American Revolutionary War (born 1727 in Great Britain)
- May 30 – Charles Dickinson, attorney killed in a duel with Andrew Jackson (born 1780)
- October 9 – Benjamin Banneker, astronomer, surveyor (born 1731)
- October 25 – Henry Knox, first United States Secretary of War, military officer of the Continental Army and later the United States Army (born 1750)

== See also ==
- Timeline of the Lewis and Clark Expedition
- Timeline of United States history (1790–1819)
- Timeline of the Thomas Jefferson presidency § 1806
