= 1878 in the United States =

- Decades: 1850s; 1860s; 1870s; 1880s; 1890s
- See also: History of the United States (1865–1918); Timeline of United States history (1860–1899); List of years in the United States

Events from the year 1878 in the United States.

== Incumbents ==
=== Federal government ===
- President: Rutherford B. Hayes (R-Ohio)
- Vice President: William A. Wheeler (R-New York)
- Chief Justice: Morrison Waite (Ohio)
- Speaker of the House of Representatives: Samuel J. Randall (D-Pennsylvania)
- Congress: 45th

==== State governments ====
Governors and lieutenant governors

=== Governors ===
- Governor of Alabama: George S. Houston (Democratic) (until November 28), Rufus W. Cobb (Democratic) (starting November 28)
- Governor of Arkansas: William Read Miller (Democratic)
- Governor of California: William Irwin (Democratic)
- Governor of Colorado: John Long Routt (Republican)
- Governor of Connecticut: Richard D. Hubbard (Democratic)
- Governor of Delaware: John P. Cochran (Democratic)
- Governor of Florida: George Franklin Drew (Democratic)
- Governor of Georgia: Alfred H. Colquitt (Democratic)
- Governor of Illinois: Shelby Moore Cullom (Republican)
- Governor of Indiana: James D. Williams (Democratic)
- Governor of Iowa: Joshua G. Newbold (Republican) (until January 17), John H. Gear (Republican) (starting January 17)
- Governor of Kansas: George T. Anthony (Republican)
- Governor of Kentucky: James B. McCreary (Democratic)
- Governor of Louisiana: Francis T. Nicholls (Democratic)
- Governor of Maine: Seldon Connor (Republican)
- Governor of Maryland: John Lee Carroll (Democratic)
- Governor of Massachusetts: Alexander H. Rice (Republican)
- Governor of Michigan: Charles Croswell (Republican)
- Governor of Minnesota: John S. Pillsbury (Republican)
- Governor of Mississippi: John M. Stone (Democratic)
- Governor of Missouri: John Smith Phelps (Democratic)
- Governor of Nebraska: Silas Garber (Republican)
- Governor of Nevada: Lewis R. Bradley (Democratic)
- Governor of New Hampshire: Benjamin F. Prescott (Republican)
- Governor of New Jersey: Joseph D. Bedle (Democratic) (until January 15), George B. McClellan (Democratic) (starting January 15)
- Governor of New York: Lucius Robinson (Democratic)
- Governor of North Carolina: Zebulon Baird Vance (Democratic)
- Governor of Ohio: Thomas L. Young (Republican) (until January 14), Richard M. Bishop (Democratic) (starting January 14)
- Governor of Oregon: Stephen F. Chadwick (Democratic) (until September 11), W. W. Thayer (Democratic) (starting September 11)
- Governor of Pennsylvania: John F. Hartranft (Republican)
- Governor of Rhode Island: Charles C. Van Zandt (Republican)
- Governor of South Carolina: Wade Hampton III (Democratic)
- Governor of Tennessee: James D. Porter (Democratic)
- Governor of Texas: Richard B. Hubbard (Democratic)
- Governor of Vermont: Horace Fairbanks (Republican) (until October 3), Redfield Proctor (Republican) (starting October 3)
- Governor of Virginia: James L. Kemper (Democratic) (until January 1), Frederick W. M. Holliday (Democratic) (starting January 1)
- Governor of West Virginia: Henry M. Mathews (Democratic)
- Governor of Wisconsin: Harrison Ludington (Republican) (until January 7), William E. Smith (Republican) (starting January 7)

=== Lieutenant governors ===
- Lieutenant Governor of California: James A. Johnson (Democratic)
- Lieutenant Governor of Colorado: Lafayette Head (Republican)
- Lieutenant Governor of Connecticut: Francis Loomis (Democratic)
- Lieutenant Governor of Florida: Noble A. Hull (Democratic)
- Lieutenant Governor of Illinois: Andrew Shuman (Republican)
- Lieutenant Governor of Indiana: Isaac P. Gray (Democratic)
- Lieutenant Governor of Iowa: vacant (until January 17), Frank T. Campbell (Republican) (starting January 17)
- Lieutenant Governor of Kansas: Lyman U. Humphrey (Republican)
- Lieutenant Governor of Kentucky: John C. Underwood (Democratic)
- Lieutenant Governor of Louisiana: Louis A. Wiltz (Democratic)
- Lieutenant Governor of Massachusetts: Horatio G. Knight (Republican)
- Lieutenant Governor of Michigan: Alonzo Sessions (Republican)
- Lieutenant Governor of Minnesota: James Wakefield (Republican)
- Lieutenant Governor of Mississippi: John M. Stone (Democratic) (until month and day unknown), William H. Sims (Democratic) (starting month and day unknown)
- Lieutenant Governor of Missouri: Henry Clay Brockmeyer (Democratic)
- Lieutenant Governor of Nebraska: Othman A. Abbott (Republican)
- Lieutenant Governor of Nevada: Jewett W. Adams (Democratic)
- Lieutenant Governor of New York: William Dorsheimer (Democratic)
- Lieutenant Governor of North Carolina: Thomas J. Jarvis (Democratic)
- Lieutenant Governor of Ohio: H. W. Curtiss (Republican) (until January 14), Jabez W. Fitch (Democratic) (starting January 14)
- Lieutenant Governor of Pennsylvania: John Latta (Democratic)
- Lieutenant Governor of Rhode Island: Albert Howard (Republican)
- Lieutenant Governor of South Carolina: William Dunlap Simpson (Democratic)
- Lieutenant Governor of Tennessee: Hugh M. McAdoo (Democratic)
- Lieutenant Governor of Texas: vacant
- Lieutenant Governor of Vermont: Redfield Proctor (Republican) (until October 3), Eben Pomeroy Colton (Republican) (starting October 3)
- Lieutenant Governor of Virginia: Henry Wirtz Thomas (Republican) (until January 1), James A. Walker (Democratic) (starting January 1)
- Lieutenant Governor of Wisconsin: Charles D. Parker (Democratic) (until January 7), James M. Bingham (Republican) (starting January 7)

== Events ==
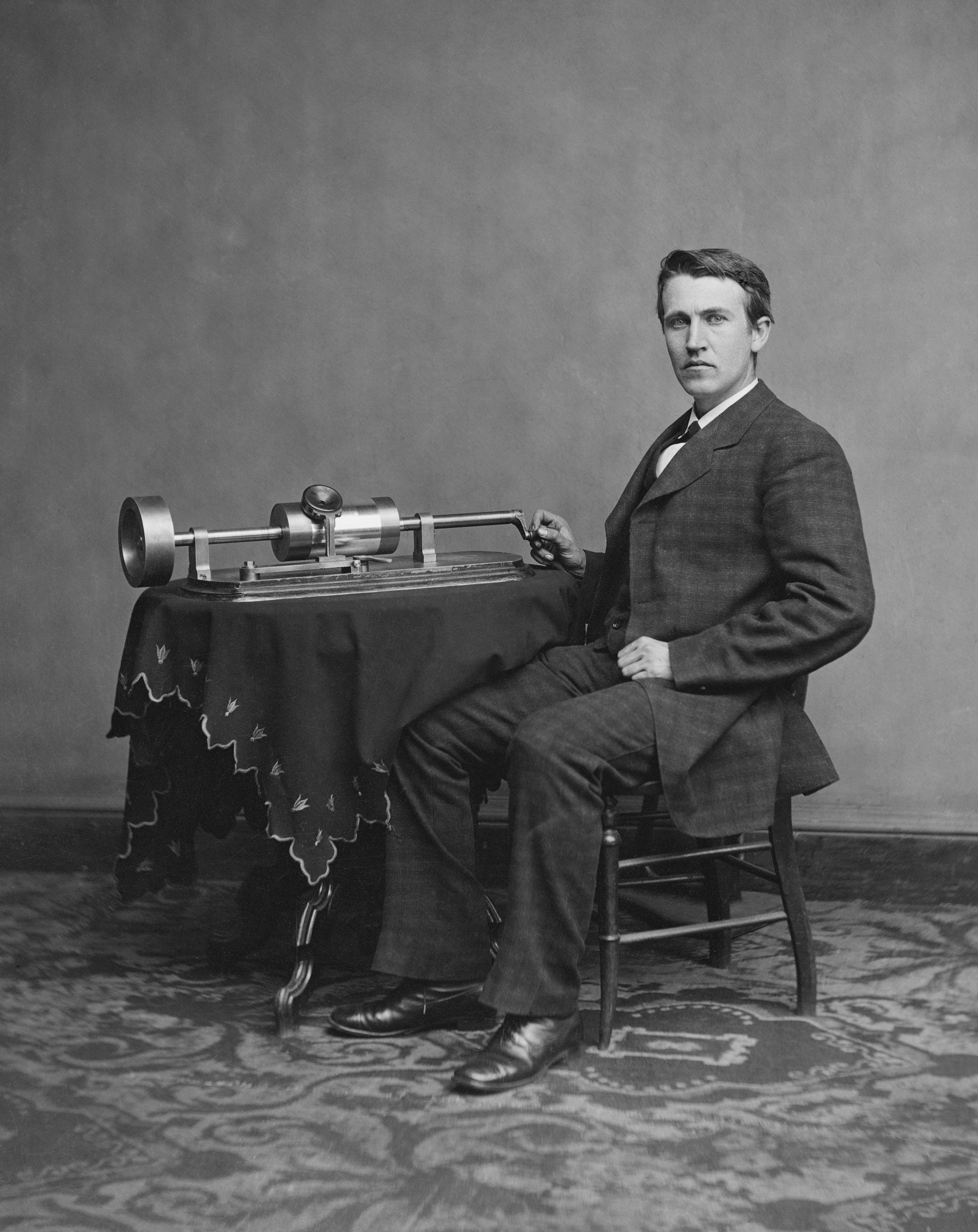
Thomas Edison and his phonograph

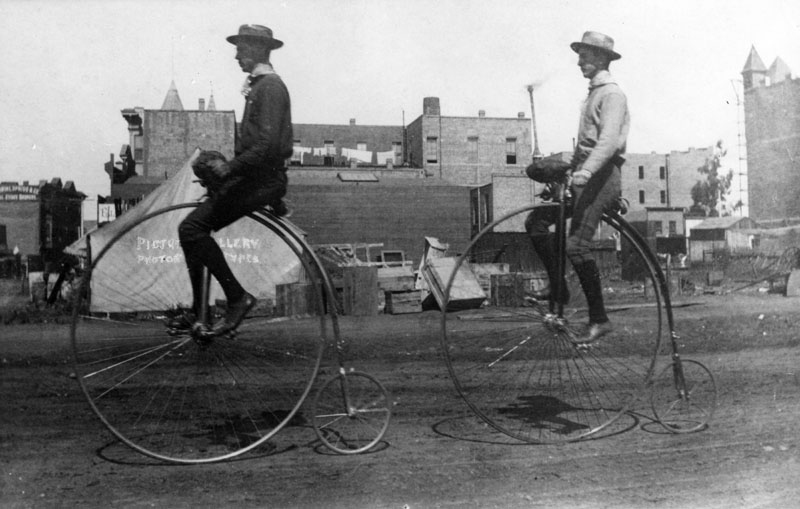
A. A. Pope starts an American bicycle craze.

- January 28
  - The world's First Telephone Exchange begins commercial operation in New Haven, Connecticut.
  - The Yale News becomes the first daily college newspaper in the U.S.
- February 18 – The Lincoln County War begins in Lincoln County, New Mexico.
- February 19 – The phonograph is patented by Thomas Edison.
- February 23 – Bland–Allison Act, leading to first minting of the Morgan dollar.
- February 28 – Mississippi State University is created by the Mississippi Legislature (under the name The Agricultural and Mechanical College of the State of Mississippi).
- March 26 – University of California, Hastings College of the Law is founded.
- April 4 – The Gunfight at Blazer's Mill occurs in Lincoln County, New Mexico.
- May 2 – The Washburn "A" Mill in Minneapolis, Minnesota explodes, killing 18.
- May 14 – Salem witchcraft trial, the last of its kind in the U.S., opens in Salem, Massachusetts.
- June 18 – Posse Comitatus Act signed into law to limit the powers of the federal government of the United States in using the United States Army to enforce domestic policy within the U.S.
- July 12 – Yellow fever epidemic begins in New Orleans. It will eventually kill 4,500 people.
- July 26 – In California, the poet and American West outlaw calling himself "Black Bart" makes his last clean getaway when he steals a safe box from a Wells Fargo stagecoach. The empty box is found later with a taunting poem inside.
- August 9 – The Wallingford Tornado of 1878, the deadliest tornado in Connecticut history, destroys the town of Wallingford, killing 34 people and injuring 70 or more.
- September 2 — Creighton University, a Jesuit university in Omaha, Nebraska, is founded.
- September 30 – The ship Priscilla arrives in Hawaii from Funchal, Madeira, marking the beginning of the Portuguese immigration to the Hawaiian Islands (1878–1913).
- October 27 – The Manhattan Savings Institution is robbed.
- November 18 – Soprano Marie Selika Williams becomes the first African American artist to perform at the White House.

=== Undated ===
- Yellow fever in Mississippi Valley kills over 13,000. 2020
- U.S. arbitration rejects Argentine claims to Paraguay's part of the Chaco region.
- The Johns Hopkins University Press, America's oldest university press, is established
- Albert Augustus Pope's Pope Manufacturing Company begins producing the Columbia high-wheel bicycle outside Boston, signalling the beginning of a bicycle craze in the U.S.
- The Remington No. 2 typewriter, the first with a shift key enabling production of lower as well as upper case characters, is introduced.
- The Wissner Piano Company is opened by Otto Wissner in Brooklyn, New York.
- Champlain College, in Burlington, VT is founded.

=== Ongoing ===
- Gilded Age (1869–c. 1896)
- Depression of 1873–79 (1873–1879)

== Sport ==
- October 2 – The Buffalo Bisons of the International League defeat the National League champion Boston Red Caps behind the pitching of Pud Galvin to become Baseball's First Undisputed Champion

== Births ==
- January 6 – Carl Sandburg, poet and historian (died 1967)
- January 9 – John B. Watson, psychologist (died 1958)
- January 29
  - Walter F. George, U.S. Senator from Georgia from 1922 to 1957 (died 1957)
  - Barney Oldfield, automobile racer (died 1946)
- January 31 – Marta Sandal, Norwegian-born singer (died 1930)
- February 1 – Hattie Caraway, U.S. Senator from Arkansas from 1931 to 1945 (died 1950)
- February 18 – Kate Gordon, psychologist (died 1963)
- February 27
  - Alvan T. Fuller, Governor of Massachusetts from 1925 to 1929 (died 1958)
  - Charles P. Strite, inventor and worker (died 1956)
- February 28 – Hugh A. Butler, U.S. Senator from Nebraska from 1941 to 1954 (died 1954)
- March 31 – Jack Johnson, boxer (died 1946)
- April 28 – Lionel Barrymore, actor (died 1954)
- May 5 – Edward Gay II, U.S. Senator from Louisiana from 1918 to 1921 (died 1952)
- May 13 – Julia Dean, stage and film actress (died 1952)
- May 21 – Glenn H. Curtiss, aviation pioneer (died 1930)
- May 25 – Bill Robinson, African American tap dancer (died 1949)
- June 1 – C. Harold Wills, automobile engineer and businessman (died 1940)
- June 4 – Thomas D. Schall, U.S. Senator from Minnesota from 1925 to 1935 (died 1935)
- June 12 – James Oliver Curwood, novelist and conservationist (died 1927)
- June 20 – Will Mastin, vaudevillian (died 1979)
- July 3 – George M. Cohan, singer, dancer, composer, actor and writer (died 1942)
- July 12 – Claude C. Bloch, admiral (died 1967)
- July 17 – Mabel Van Buren, actress (died 1947)
- July 29
  - Don Marquis, author (died 1937)
  - James M. Slattery, U.S. Senator from Illinois from 1939 to 1940 (died 1948)
- August 2 – Nathan L. Bachman, U.S. Senator from Tennessee from 1933 to 1937 (died 1937)
- August 4 – Ernest Lundeen, U.S. Senator from Minnesota from 1937 to 1940 (died 1940)
- August 13 – Harold Clarke Goddard, Shakespearean scholar (died 1950)
- August 28 – George Whipple, pathologist, recipient of the Nobel Prize in Physiology or Medicine in 1934 (died 1976)
- August 31 – Frank Jarvis, track athlete (died 1933)
- September 14
  - Ion Farris, politician, Speaker of the Florida House of Representatives (died 1934)
  - Scott Loftin, U.S. Senator from Florida in 1936 (died 1953)
- September 18 – James O. Richardson, admiral (died 1974)
- September 20 – Upton Sinclair, novelist (died 1968)
- October 2 – Richard Spikes, African American inventor (died 1963)
- October 16 – Maxie Long, track athlete (died 1959)
- October 17 – Louise Dresser, actress (died 1965)
- October 18 – Blind Uncle Gaspard, Cajun vocalist and guitarist (died 1937)
- October 19 – Alphonse Picou, jazz clarinettist (died 1961)
- October 31 – Roberta Lawson, Indigenous American (Lenape) activist and musician (died 1940)
- November 17 – Grace Abbott, social worker and activist (died 1939)
- November 26 – Major Taylor, first African-American World Champion Cyclist (died 1932)
- November 23 – Ernest King, Commander in Chief, U.S. Fleet and Chief of Naval Operations (COMINCH-CNO) during World War II (died 1956)
- December 1 – Nathaniel Baldwin, inventor and Mormon fundamentalist (died 1961)
- C. Louise Boehringer, educationalist (died 1956)
- Rufus Billings
- Sam Strong

== Deaths ==
- February 11
  - Charles Magill Conrad, U.S. Senator from Louisiana from 1842 to 1843 (born 1804)
  - Gideon Welles, politician (born 1802)
- February 18 – John Tunstall, rancher, merchant, first man killed in the Lincoln County War (born 1853)
- March 6 – Asa Biggs, U.S. Senator from North Carolina from 1855 to 1858 (born 1811)
- March 29 – Mark Hopkins, Jr., entrepreneur (born 1813)
- April 4 – Richard M. Brewer, gunslinger, cowboy (born 1850)
- April 5 – Buckshot Roberts, buffalo hunter who killed Richard M. Brewer (shot) (born 1831)
- May 25 – John Scott Harrison, member of the United States House of Representatives from Ohio, son of William Henry Harrison, father of Benjamin Harrison (born 1804)
- June 16 – Crawford Long, American surgeon and pharmacist (born 1815)
- June 27 – Sidney Breese, U.S. Senator from Illinois from 1843 to 1849 (born 1800)
- September 23 – Kinloch Falconer, 23rd Secretary of State of Mississippi (born 1838)
- October 5 – George Boyer Vashon, African-American attorney, educationalist, abolitionist, essayist and poet (born 1824)
- October 20 – Hiram Paulding, admiral (born 1797)
- November 16 – Sarah Harris Fayerweather, African-American whose 1832 admission to a Connecticut school resulted in the first integrated schoolhouse (born 1812)
- November 28 – Orson Hyde, religious leader (born 1805)
- December 10 – Henry Wells, businessman (born 1805)

== See also ==
- Timeline of United States history (1860–1899)
