= 1871 in the United States =

- Decades: 1850s; 1860s; 1870s; 1880s; 1890s
- See also: History of the United States (1865–1918); Timeline of United States history (1860–1899); List of years in the United States

Events from the year 1871 in the United States.

== Incumbents ==
=== Federal government ===
- President: Ulysses S. Grant (R-Illinois)
- Vice President: Schuyler Colfax (R-Indiana)
- Chief Justice: Salmon P. Chase (Ohio)
- Speaker of the House of Representatives: James G. Blaine (R-Maine)
- Congress: 41st (until March 4), 42nd (starting March 4)

==== State governments ====
Governors and lieutenant governors

=== Governors ===
- Governor of Alabama: Robert B. Lindsay (Democratic)
- Governor of Arkansas: Powell Clayton (Republican) (until March 17), Ozra Amander Hadley (Republican) (starting March 17)
- Governor of California: Henry Huntly Haight (Democratic) (until December 8), Newton Booth (Republican) (starting December 8)
- Governor of Connecticut: James E. English (Democratic) (until May 16), Marshall Jewell (Republican) (starting May 16)
- Governor of Delaware: Gove Saulsbury (Democratic) (until January 17), James Ponder (Democratic) (starting January 17)
- Governor of Florida: Harrison Reed (Republican)
- Governor of Georgia: Rufus Bullock (Republican) (until October 30), Benjamin Conley (Republican) (starting October 30)
- Governor of Illinois: John M. Palmer (Republican)
- Governor of Indiana: Conrad Baker (Republican)
- Governor of Iowa: Samuel Merrill (Republican)
- Governor of Kansas: James M. Harvey (Republican)
- Governor of Kentucky: John W. Stevenson (Democratic) (until February 3), Preston H. Leslie (Democratic) (starting February 3)
- Governor of Louisiana: Henry C. Warmoth (Republican)
- Governor of Maine: Joshua Chamberlain (Republican) (until January 4), Sidney Perham (Republican Party) (starting January 4)
- Governor of Maryland: Oden Bowie (Democratic)
- Governor of Massachusetts: William Claflin (Republican)
- Governor of Michigan: Henry P. Baldwin (Republican)
- Governor of Minnesota: Horace Austin (Republican)
- Governor of Mississippi: James L. Alcorn (Republican) (until November 30), Ridgley C. Powers (Republican) (starting November 30)
- Governor of Missouri: Joseph W. McClurg (Republican) (until January 4), B. Gratz Brown (Liberal Republican) (starting January 4)
- Governor of Nebraska: David Butler (Republican) (until June 2), William H. James (Republican) (starting June 2)
- Governor of Nevada: Henry G. Blasdel (Republican) (until January 2), Lewis R. Bradley (Democratic) (starting January 2)
- Governor of New Hampshire: Onslow Stearns (Republican) (until June 14), James A. Weston (Democratic) (starting June 14)
- Governor of New Jersey: Theodore Fitz Randolph (Democratic)
- Governor of New York: John Thompson Hoffman (Democratic)
- Governor of North Carolina: Tod Robinson Caldwell (Republican)
- Governor of Ohio: Rutherford B. Hayes (Republican)
- Governor of Oregon: La Fayette Grover (Democratic)
- Governor of Pennsylvania: John W. Geary (Republican)
- Governor of Rhode Island: Seth Padelford (Republican)
- Governor of South Carolina: Robert Kingston Scott (Republican)
- Governor of Tennessee: Dewitt Clinton Senter (Republican) (until October 10), John C. Brown (Democratic) (starting October 10)
- Governor of Texas: Edmund J. Davis (Republican)
- Governor of Vermont: John W. Stewart (Republican)
- Governor of Virginia: Gilbert Carlton Walker (Democratic)
- Governor of West Virginia: William E. Stevenson (Republican) (until March 4), John J. Jacob (Democratic)/(Independent) (starting March 4)
- Governor of Wisconsin: Lucius Fairchild (Republican)

=== Lieutenant governors ===
- Lieutenant Governor of Alabama: Edward H. Moren (Democratic)
- Lieutenant Governor of Arkansas: James M. Johnson (Republican) (until March 14), vacant (starting March 14)
- Lieutenant Governor of California: William Holden (Democratic) (until December 8), Romualdo Pacheco (Republican) (starting December 8)
- Lieutenant Governor of Connecticut: Julius Hotchkiss (Democratic) (until May 16), Morris Tyler (Republican) (starting May 16)
- Lieutenant Governor of Florida: vacant (until month and day unknown), Samuel T. Day (Republican) (starting month and day unknown)
- Lieutenant Governor of Illinois: John Dougherty (Republican)
- Lieutenant Governor of Indiana: William Cumback (Republican)
- Lieutenant Governor of Iowa: Madison Miner Walden (Republican) (until month and day unknown), Henry C. Bulis (Republican) (starting month and day unknown)
- Lieutenant Governor of Kansas: Charles Vernon Eskridge (Republican) (until month and day unknown), Peter Percival Elder (Republican) (starting month and day unknown)
- Lieutenant Governor of Kentucky: vacant (until September 5), John G. Carlisle (Democratic) (starting September 5)
- Lieutenant Governor of Louisiana: Oscar J. Dunn (Republican) (until November 22), P. B. S. Pinchback (Republican) (starting November 22)
- Lieutenant Governor of Massachusetts: Joseph Tucker (Republican)
- Lieutenant Governor of Michigan: Morgan Bates (Republican)
- Lieutenant Governor of Minnesota: William H. Yale (Republican)
- Lieutenant Governor of Mississippi: Ridgley C. Powers (Republican) (until month and day unknown), Alexander K. Davis (Republican) (starting month and day unknown)
- Lieutenant Governor of Missouri: Edwin Obed Stanard (Republican) (until January 4), Joseph J. Gravely (Liberal Republican) (starting January 4)
- Lieutenant Governor of Nevada: James S. Slingerland (political party unknown) (until January 2), Frank Denver (political party unknown) (starting January 2)
- Lieutenant Governor of New York: Allen C. Beach (Democratic)
- Lieutenant Governor of North Carolina: Tod R. Caldwell (Republican) (until month and day unknown), vacant (starting month and day unknown)
- Lieutenant Governor of Ohio: John C. Lee (Republican)
- Lieutenant Governor of Rhode Island: Pardon Stevens (political party unknown)
- Lieutenant Governor of South Carolina: Alonzo J. Ransier (Republican)
- Lieutenant Governor of Tennessee: Dorsey B. Thomas (Democratic) (until month and day unknown), John C. Vaughn (Democratic) (starting month and day unknown)
- Lieutenant Governor of Texas: vacant
- Lieutenant Governor of Vermont: George N. Dale (Republican)
- Lieutenant Governor of Virginia: John Lawrence Marye, Jr. (Conservative)
- Lieutenant Governor of Wisconsin: Thaddeus C. Pound (Republican)

== Events ==
=== January–March ===
- February 6 – A train collision in New York kills 22.
- February 21 – District of Columbia Organic Act of 1871
- March 22
  - In North Carolina, William Woods Holden becomes the first governor of a U.S. state to be removed from office by impeachment.
  - The U.S. Army issues an order for the abandonment of Fort Kearny, Nebraska.

=== April–June ===
- April 20 – The U.S President Ulysses S. Grant signs the Ku Klux Klan Act.
- May 4 – The first supposedly Major League Baseball game is played.
- May 8 – The first Major League Baseball home run is hit by Ezra Sutton of the Cleveland Forest Citys.
- June 10 – Captain McLane Tilton leads 109 U.S. Marines in a naval attack on the Han River forts in Korea.

=== July–September ===
- July 21–August 26 – First ever photographs of Yellowstone National Park region taken by the photographer William Henry Jackson during Hayden Geological Survey of 1871.
- July 30 – An explosion on the Staten Island Ferry kills 72 and injures 135.
- September
  - Whaling disaster of 1871: 1,219 people abandon 33 whaling ships caught in the ice pack off the northern coast of Alaska.
  - Seawanhaka Yacht Club founded at Centre Island, New York, one of the earliest surviving yacht clubs in the Western Hemisphere.
- September 2 – The disastrous Polaris expedition reaches 82°45′N, the northernmost latitude of any ship to this time.
- September 3 – New York City residents, tired of the corruption of the "Tammany Hall" political machine and "Boss" William M. Tweed, its "Grand Sachem", meet to form the 'Committee of Seventy' to reform local politics.

=== October–December ===
- October 8 – Four major fires break out in the Upper Midwest in Chicago, Illinois, Peshtigo, Wisconsin, Holland, Michigan, and Manistee, Michigan. The Great Chicago Fire is the most infamous of these, killing 300 people, destroying 17,500 buildings and leaving nearly 100,000 people homeless, although the Peshtigo Fire in Wisconsin kills as many as 2,500 people, making it the deadliest fire in United States history.
- October 24 – Chinese massacre of 1871 18 Chinese immigrants in Chinatown, Los Angeles, are killed by a mob of 500 men.
- October 27 – Boss Tweed of Tammany Hall is arrested for bribery, ending his grip on New York City.
- c. November – The South Improvement Company is formed in Pennsylvania by John D. Rockefeller and a group of major railroad interests, in an early effort to organize and control the petroleum industry in the U.S.
- November 5 – Wickenburg massacre: Six men traveling by stagecoach are reportedly murdered by the Yavapai Indians in Arizona Territory.
- November 17 – The National Rifle Association of America is granted a charter by the state of New York.
- December 19
  - The city of Birmingham, Alabama, is incorporated with the merger of three pre-existing towns.
  - Albert L. Jones of New York receives a patent for corrugated paper.

=== Ongoing ===
- Reconstruction era (1865–1877)
- Gilded Age (1869–c. 1896)

== Births ==
- February 14 – Florence Roberts, American actress (died 1927)
- February 21 – James Thomas Marshall (died 1957)
- March 6 – Ben Harney, composer and ragtime pianist (died 1938)
- May 19 – Walter Russell, polymath (died 1963)
- May 31 – John G. Townsend, Jr., U.S. Senator from Delaware from 1929 to 1941 (died 1964)
- June 17 – James Weldon Johnson, African American songwriter, author, diplomat and educator (died 1938)
- June 21 – DeWitt Jennings, actor (died 1937)
- July 6 – Evelyn Selbie, actress (died 1950)
- July 7 – Richard Carle, American actor (died 1941)
- July 27 – Ollie Murray James, U.S. Senator from Kentucky from 1913 to 1918 (died 1918)
- August 19
  - Joseph E. Widener, art collector (died 1943)
  - Orville Wright, pioneer aviator (died 1948)
- August 25 – Ross Winn, American anarchist writer, publisher (died 1912)
- August 27 – Theodore Dreiser, novelist (died 1945)
- September 9 – Magnus Johnson, U.S. Senator from Minnesota from 1923 to 1925 (died 1936)
- October 2 – Cordell Hull, United States Secretary of State, recipient of the Nobel Peace Prize (died 1955)
- October 11 – Harriet Boyd Hawes, archaeologist (died 1945)
- October 14 – William Howard Thompson, U.S. Senator from Kansas from 1913 to 1919 (died 1928)
- October 17 – Thaddeus H. Caraway, U.S. Senator from Arkansas from 1921 to 1931 (died 1931)
- October 19
  - Walter Bradford Cannon, physiologist (died 1945)
  - Clyde M. Reed, U.S. Senator from Kansas from 1939 to 1949 (died 1949)
- November 1 – Stephen Crane, novelist (died 1900)
- November 9 – Florence R. Sabin, American medical scientist (died 1953)
- November 10 – Winston Churchill, novelist (died 1947)
- December 9 – Joe Kelley, baseball player (died 1943)
- December 20 – Henry Kimball Hadley, composer (died 1937)

== Deaths ==
- January 15 – Edward C. Delavan, temperance movement leader (born 1793)
- February 12 – Alice Cary, poet, sister to Phoebe Cary (born 1820)
- April 2 – Jacob M. Howard, U.S. Senator from Michigan from 1862 to 1871 (born 1805)
- April 23 – James Monroe Whitfield, African American barber, poet and abolitionist (born 1822)
- May 11 – Thomas Buchanan Read, poet and portrait painter (born 1822)
- July 9 – John Slidell, U.S. Senator from Louisiana from 1853 to 1861 (born 1793)
- July 15 – Tad Lincoln, youngest son of President Lincoln (born 1853)
- July 31 – Phoebe Cary, poet, sister to Alice Cary (born 1824)
- September 9 – Stand Watie, Cherokee Nation leader and a general in the Confederate Army during the American Civil War (born 1806)
- September 21 – Bird Beers Chapman, delegate to the U.S. House of Representatives (born 1821)
- September 22 – Lewis Golding Arnold, U.S. Army officer and a brigadier general in the Union Army during the American Civil War (born 1817)
- October 26 – Robert Anderson, United States Army officer during the American Civil War, died in Nice, France (born 1805)

== See also ==
- Timeline of United States history (1860–1899)
