= 1878 Alabama gubernatorial election =

- August 5, 1878
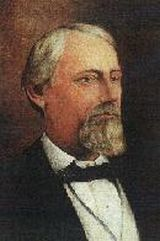
Nominee	Rufus W. Cobb
Party	Democratic
Popular vote	88,255
Percentage	100.00%
- County results Cobb: >90%
Governor before election
George S. Houston
Democratic
Elected Governor
Rufus W. Cobb
Democratic

The 1878 Alabama gubernatorial election took place on August 5, 1878, in order to elect the governor of Alabama. Democrat Rufus W. Cobb ran unopposed.

== Results ==
1878 Alabama gubernatorial election
Party	Candidate	Votes	%
Democratic	Rufus W. Cobb	88,255	100.00
Total votes		88,255	100.00
Democratic hold			
