= Sumner Lincoln Fairfield =

American poet (1803-1844)

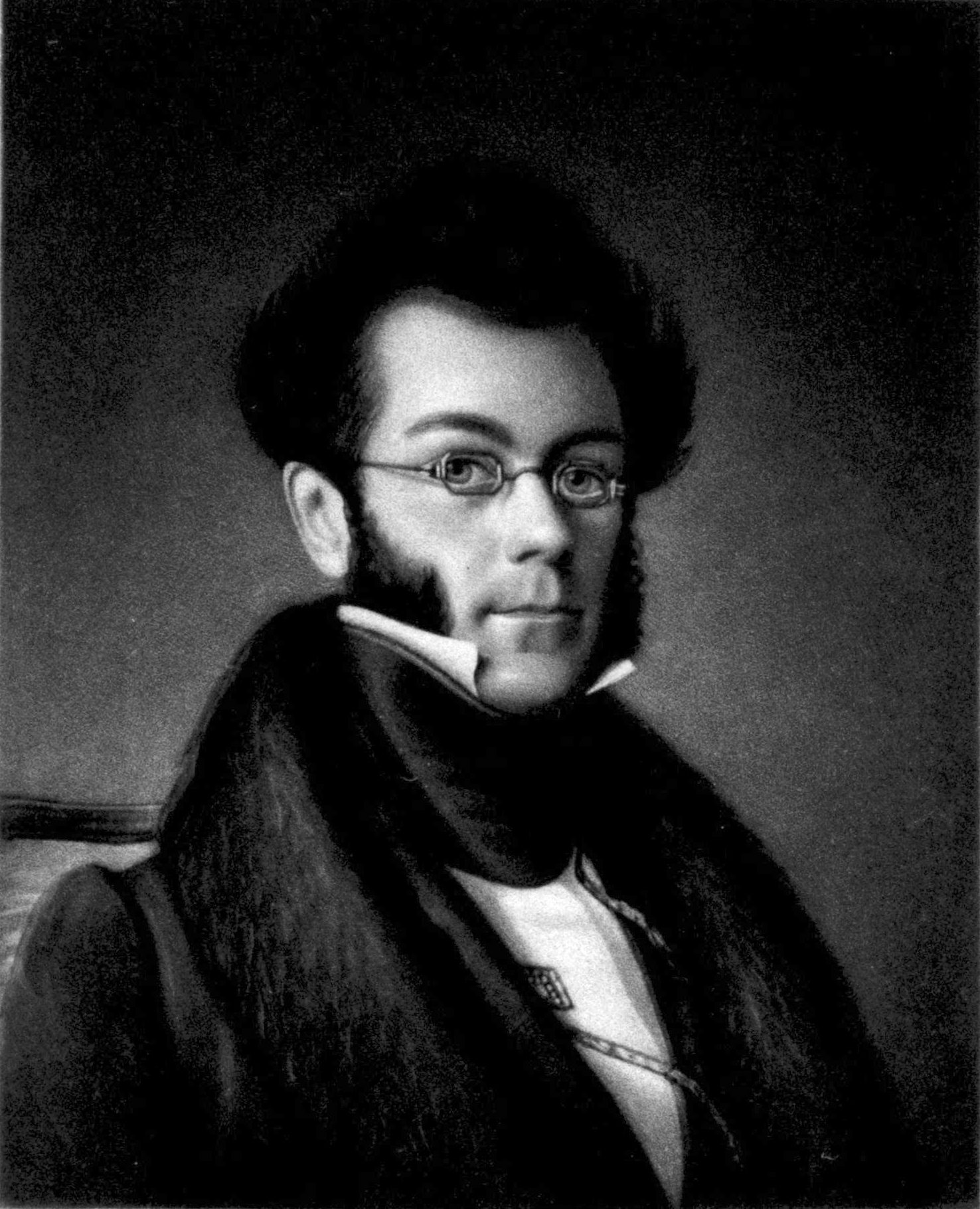
Sumner Lincoln Fairfield

Sumner Lincoln Fairfield (June 25, 1803 – March 6, 1844) was an American poet, born in Warwick, Massachusetts to Dr. Abner Fairfield and Lucy Lincoln. From 1818 to 1820, he studied at Brown University, but he was compelled to leave after two years. He taught school in Georgia and South Carolina. In December 1825 he spent four months in England and when he returned he married Jane Frazee on September 20, 1826. Sumner had a very sensitive and melancholy personality and according to his wife Jane, "His nature was haughty, unbending, and reserved; he could not brook personal or newspaper attacks. I have seen him writhe under mental pain even upon a criticism of a poem."

== Principal works ==
- The Battle of Borodino. 1821
- The Siege of Constantinople A Poem. 1822
- Memoirs of the Life of Mrs. Lucy Fairfield. 1823
- Poems. 1823
- Lays of Melpomene. 1824
- Mina A Dramatic Sketch, with Other Poems. 1825
- The Sisters of St. Clara. 1825
- The Passage of the Sea A Poem : with Other Pieces. 1826
- The Heir of the World, And Lesser Poems. 1829
- Abaddon, the Spirit of Destruction; And Other Poems. 1830
- The Last Night of Pompeii A Poem, and Lays and Legends. 1832
- The Poems and Prose Writings of Sumner Lincoln Fairfield In Two Volumes; Vol. I. 1841
