= 1880 Alabama gubernatorial election =

- August 2, 1880
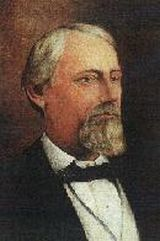

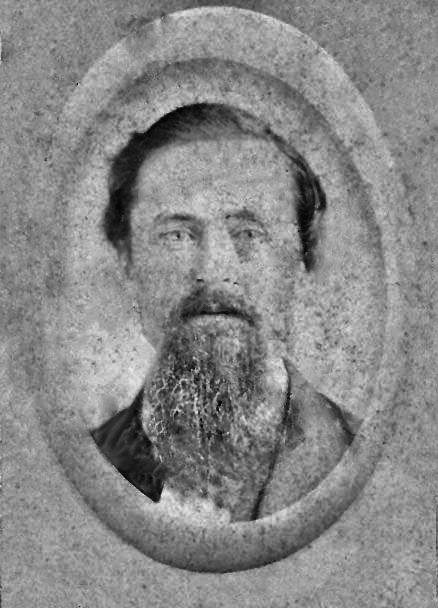
Nominee	Rufus W. Cobb	James Madison Pickens
Party	Democratic	Greenback
Popular vote	134,905	42,363
Percentage	76.10%	23.90%
- County results Cobb: 50–60% 60–70% 70–80% 80–90% >90% Pickens: 50–60% 70–80%
Governor before election
Rufus W. Cobb
Democratic
Elected Governor
Rufus W. Cobb
Democratic

The 1880 Alabama gubernatorial election took place on August 2, 1880, in order to elect the governor of Alabama. Incumbent Democrat Rufus W. Cobb ran for reelection to a second term.

== Results ==
1880 Alabama gubernatorial election
Party	Candidate	Votes	%
Democratic	Rufus W. Cobb (incumbent)	134,905	76.10
Greenback	James Madison Pickens	42,363	23.90
Total votes		177,268	100.00
Democratic hold			
