= Woman's Institute of Yonkers =

Woman's Institute of Yonkers (originally known as Free Circulating Library for Self-Supporting Women; est. 1880) was an American social service experiment in 19th-century Yonkers, New York that grew into a far-reaching charitable, relief work institution for women. It is Yonkers' oldest social service agency.

The Institute was the natural outgrowth of circumstances rather than an original intention in the scope of the work of the Institute. It was so closely interwoven with, and incidental to, the educational, industrial, social and civic activities of the Charity Organisation Society that it was impossible to separate its sphere of usefulness from them. Originating as a free circulating library, one of the most noteworthy achievements of the Institute was the work of the Fairview Garden School of Yonkers.

== History ==
In May 1880, Mary Marshall Butler and nine friends began a social service experiment in Yonkers. Butler was a pioneer in nearly all forms of social and civic work in the city. Like Butler, the other founders were members of the prominent families of Yonkers; they included Mary Marshall Butler, Harriet A. Butler, Armenia Palmer Baird, Louise Terry Collins, Harriet B. Dwight, Marcia F. Flagg, Kate S. Hawley, Charlotte Louise Jackson, Cornelia B. Lawson, and Emilie F. Randolph.

Founded on interests in real work and service, it began in two small rooms at No. 49 Palisade Avenue. It increased in size and usefulness so that when two years had passed, it was necessary to secure larger quarters. In September 1883, a house at No. 48 Palisade Avenue was offered, rent free. In 1889, the society was incorporated. In October 1892, the name "Free Circulating Library for Self-Supporting Women" was changed to "The Woman's Institute of Yonkers". The buildings at Nos. 36 and 38 Palisade Avenue were erected for the use of the society and opened to the public April 3, 1893.

== Branches ==
The many branches of work included:

- Library and reading room, until the public library took its place in 1884
- Woman's Institute Club, established in 1882. It was a charter member of the New York Association of Working Girls' Societies, later known as the National League of Girls' Clubs, with which this society continued to be affiliated.
- Class department covering instruction in domestic art and science
- An employment bureau was established in 1893. That year, 1893, witnessed the widespread distress throughout the U.S. occasioned by financial disaster. In Yonkers, as elsewhere, the closing of factories, the lack of work and consequent poverty among the working people necessitated the organizing of a Citizens' Relief Committee representing the various churches and benevolent societies. The committee met at the Woman's Institute and opened as a means of relief an Employment Bureau, upon whose roll hundreds of women were registered; about half of whom were assisted to some kind of work.
- Woman's Exchange was established in 1892, and continued until 1899.
- The lunch room was opened in 1894 and was self-supporting.
- The Penny Provident Stamp Station opened January, 1896, continued until October 1915. Soon after, the Thrift Bank was opened.
- The Civic League was organized January, 1895. Among its definite activities, some of which have passed to other channels, were the following:

- Improvement at city jail in detention for women and children
- Street improvements
- Protection of animals
- Public parks and play grounds
- School visiting committee
- The early closing movement
- Tenement house inspection

== Cooperation ==
This Institute believed in cooperation and furnished headquarters and meeting rooms, rent free to the following societies: Yonker's Association for the Blind; Girls' League of Yonkers (Inc.); Girl Scouts; Woman's Club; The Lecture League of Yonkers; Red Cross, local chapter; and Red Cross Home Nursing Classes; Society for the Prevention of Cruelty to Animals; Yonkers Visiting Nursing Association; Central Council of Social Agencies; Women justices of the peace; Yonkers branch Westchester committee on child labor and school attendance.
