= Boston Gleaning Circle =

First female literary society in the United States

The Boston Gleaning Circle was a female literary organization established by twenty women in 1805. It was the first female literary society in America. They read "any book favorable to the improvement of the mind" including history, theology, geography and poetry. Members took turns in reciting from the books.

== Sources ==
- Kelly, Mary. "A More Glorious Revolution: Women's Antebellum Reading Circles and the Pursuit of Public Influence", The New England Quarterly, Vol. 76, no. 2 (June 2003), p. 163-196.
