= Wissner Piano Company =

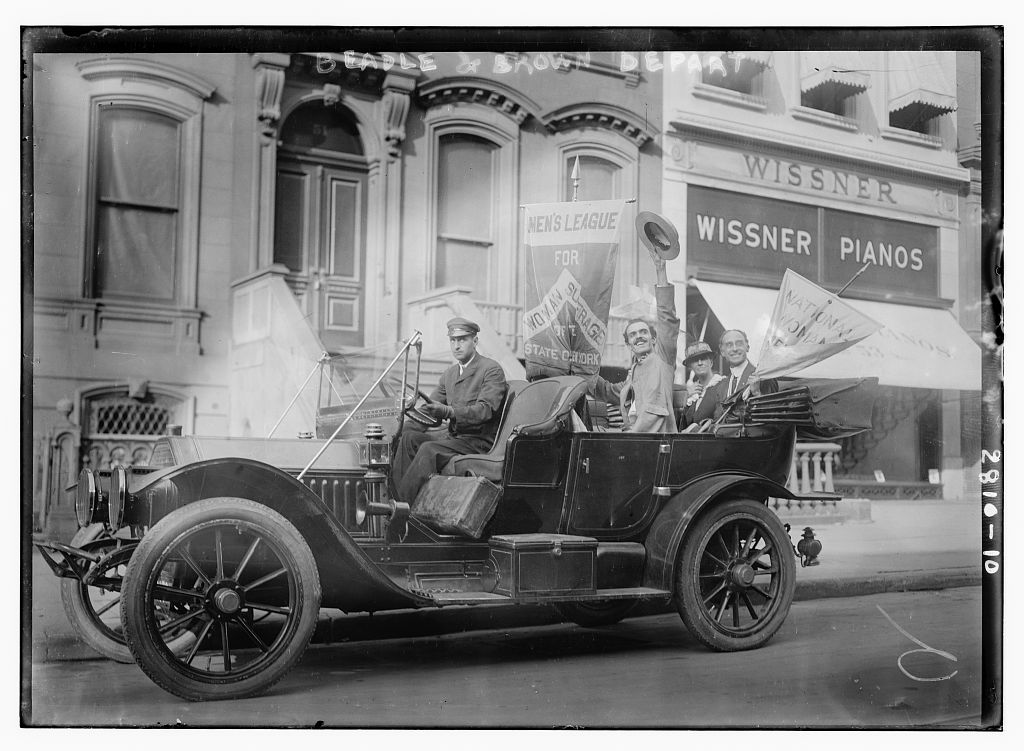
Wissner Pianos

The Wissner Piano Company was opened in Brooklyn, New York in 1878 by Otto Wissner ("a thoroughly skilled piano maker") and his two sons, William Wissner and Otto Wissner, Jr. They were well known for the high quality of their pianos. The Wissner Company went out of business around 1942.
