= John Drayton =

American judge (1766–1822)

John Drayton II
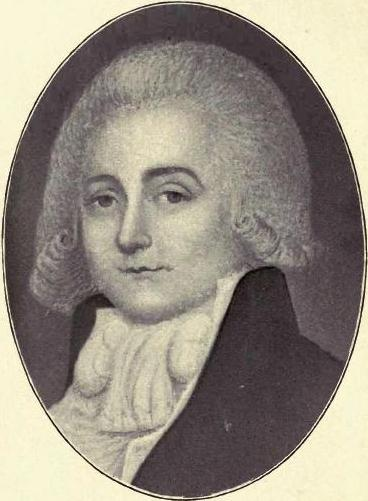

Judge of the United States District Court for the District of South Carolina
- In office May 7, 1812 – November 27, 1822
- Appointed by: James Madison
- Preceded by: Thomas Bee
- Succeeded by: Thomas Lee

40th Governor of South Carolina
- In office December 10, 1808 – December 8, 1810
- Lieutenant: Frederick Nance
- Preceded by: Charles Pinckney
- Succeeded by: Henry Middleton
- In office January 23, 1800 – December 8, 1802
- Lieutenant: Richard Winn
- Preceded by: Edward Rutledge
- Succeeded by: James Burchill Richardson

18th Lieutenant Governor of South Carolina
- In office December 18, 1798 – January 23, 1800
- Governor: Edward Rutledge
- Preceded by: Robert Anderson
- Succeeded by: Richard Winn

Personal details
- Born: John Drayton II; June 22, 1766 Charleston, Province of South Carolina, British America
- Died: November 27, 1822 (aged 56) Charleston, South Carolina, U.S.
- Party: Democratic-Republican
- Spouse: Hester Rose Tidyman (m. 1794)
- Parent: William Drayton
- Education: Inner Temple (read law)

John Drayton II (June 22, 1766 – November 27, 1822) was the 40th governor of South Carolina and a United States district judge of the United States District Court for the District of South Carolina.

== Education and career ==
Born on June 22, 1766, in Charleston, Province of South Carolina, British America, to William Henry Drayton and Dorothy Golightly, Drayton read law in 1788 at the Inner Temple in London, England. He engaged in private practice in Charleston, South Carolina in 1788, from 1789 to 1794, from 1796 to 1798, and from 1811 to 1812. He was a warden (assistant to the intendant) for Charleston starting in 1788. He was a rice planter in Georgetown County, South Carolina from 1794 to 1822. He was a member of the South Carolina House of Representatives from 1792 to 1796. He was Lieutenant Governor of South Carolina from 1798 to 1800. He was Governor of South Carolina from 1801 to 1803, and from 1809 to 1810. He was the Intendant (Mayor) of Charleston from 1803 to 1805. He was a member of the South Carolina Senate from 1805 to 1808. He was a member of the Democratic-Republican Party.

== Federal judicial service ==
Drayton was nominated by President James Madison on May 4, 1812, to a seat on the United States District Court for the District of South Carolina vacated by Judge Thomas Bee. He was confirmed by the United States Senate on May 7, 1812, and received his commission the same day. His service terminated on November 27, 1822, due to his death in Charleston.

=== Notable case ===
Drayton issued perhaps the earliest judicial decision holding that, under the laws of the United States, slaves captured in time of war on enemy ships could not be claimed as property.

== Personal life ==
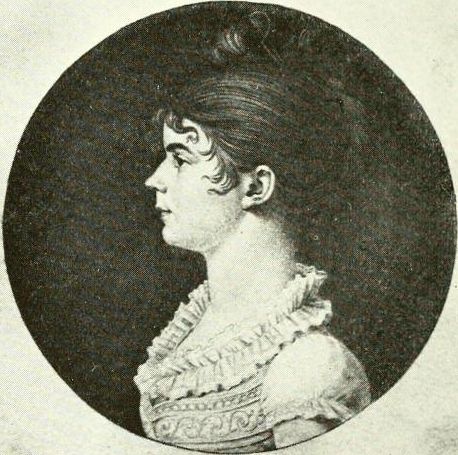
Portrait of Mrs. Drayton

Drayton married Hester Rose Tidyman, daughter of Dr. Phillip Tidyman, on October 6, 1794.

== Books ==
- Carolinian Florist
- A View of South Carolina, as Respects Her Natural and Civil Concerns
- Memoirs of the American Revolution from its Commencement to the Year 1776

Political offices
Preceded by Robert Anderson	Lieutenant Governor of South Carolina; 1798–1800	Succeeded by Richard Winn
Preceded by Edward Rutledge	Governor of South Carolina; 1800–1802	Succeeded by James Burchill Richardson
Preceded by David Deas	Mayor of Charleston, South Carolina; 1803–1804	Succeeded by Thomas Winstanley
Preceded by Charles Pinckney	Governor of South Carolina; 1808–1810	Succeeded by Henry Middleton
Legal offices
Preceded by Thomas Bee	Judge of the United States District Court for the District of South Carolina; 1812–1822	Succeeded by Thomas Lee
