= Rufus W. Cobb =

American politician (1829–1913)

Rufus Willis Cobb
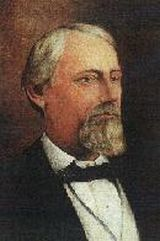

25th Governor of Alabama
- In office November 28, 1878 – December 1, 1882
- Preceded by: George S. Houston
- Succeeded by: Edward A. O'Neal

Member of the Alabama Senate
- In office 1872; 1876

Personal details
- Born: February 25, 1829 Ashville, Alabama, US
- Died: November 26, 1913 (aged 84) Birmingham, Alabama, US
- Resting place: Forest Hill Cemetery, Birmingham, Alabama, US
- Party: Democratic

Rufus Willis Cobb (February 25, 1829 – November 26, 1913) was an American Democratic politician who was the 25th governor of Alabama from 1878 to 1882. He is the only person to serve as both Governor of Alabama and Grand Master of the Grand Lodge of Alabama at the same time.

== Biography ==
Rufus Wills Cobb was born on February 25, 1829, in Ashville, St. Clair County, Alabama. Cobb's ancestors came to America from England and Wales, settling in Virginia in the colonial era and moving to Alabama in the early 1800s. He was the son of John W. and Catherine (Stevens) Leak Cobb, who lived on a plantation, Cobb Springs, at Ashville. Cobb was educated at an academy in Ashville and graduated from the University of Tennessee, at Knoxville, in 1850. Returning to Ashville, he read law in the office of John C. Thomasson and was admitted to the bar in 1855. He practiced law in St. Clair until he moved to Shelby County, Alabama, in 1867 and became a law partner of B. B. Lewis.

When Alabama declared secession from the United States in 1861, Cobb joined the Confederate States Army as captain of Co. C., Tenth Alabama Infantry Regiment, Forney's brigade, and went to Virginia with that regiment. He remained there until, in 1863, he was assigned to General Joseph Wheeler's cavalry in Tennessee and placed in charge of a scouting party. At the end of the war, Cobb resumed his law practice.

Cobb was elected to the Alabama Senate in 1872 and 1876. During his term in the state senate, he collaborated with Peter Hamilton of Mobile on a plan for readjusting the state debt, which the legislature adopted. Cobb was a friend and advisor of Governor George Smith Houston during Houston's administration.

Cobb was elected governor in 1878 and reelected in 1880. "He had a quiet administration, without striking events." (Owen, p. 357) The population of Alabama was growing; by 1880, the federal census recorded 1,262,505, and the problems of administrative finance and control of the railroads fell to Cobb. "His administration made improvements in tax assessment and reduced the cost of surplus in the state treasury." (Stewart, p. 127)

Also, during Cobb's two terms, the State Railroad Commission, the State Bar Association, and the Tuskegee Normal and Industrial Institute were created. The records of Governor Cobb's administration reflect that prohibition was a significant controversy during his last term. The prohibition forces attempted to pass a statewide local option law but were unsuccessful.

After his term as governor had expired, he retired to private life for a time, but in 1888 accepted the appointment to the office of probate judge of Shelby County. Cobb also served as president of the Central Iron Works at Helena from 1873 to 1891, continuing to hold his title while serving as governor. He was also an attorney for the Louisville and Nashville Railroad; he was involved in cotton planting and developing an iron mine, the Delmar, in northern Alabama.

Cobb belonged to all the branches of the York Rite Masons and was grand master of the grand lodge of Alabama in 1879 and 1880. He was the only man who was grand master and governor at the same time. He was a member of all the lodges of the Scottish Rite Masonry up to and including the thirty-second degree. Cobb's last residence was Birmingham. His grave is located in Birmingham's Forest Hill Cemetery.

Party political offices
Preceded by George S. Houston	Democratic nominee for Governor of Alabama; 1878, 1880	Succeeded by Edward A. O'Neal
Political offices
Preceded by George S. Houston	Governor of Alabama; 1878–1882	Succeeded by Edward A. O'Neal
