= Richard Winn =

American politician (1750–1818)

19th Lieutenant Governor of South Carolina
- In office December 4, 1800 – December 8, 1802
- Preceded by: John Drayton
- Succeeded by: Ezekiel Pickens

Member of the U.S. House of Representatives from South Carolina
- In office March 4, 1793 – March 3, 1797
- Preceded by: Thomas Sumter
- Succeeded by: Thomas Sumter
- Constituency: 4th district
- In office January 24, 1803 – March 3, 1813
- Preceded by: Thomas Sumter (4th); William Butler (5th)
- Succeeded by: Wade Hampton I (4th); David R. Evans (5th)
- Constituency: 4th district (1803); 5th district (1803-13)

Personal details
- Born: 1750 Fauquier County, Virginia
- Died: December 19, 1818 (aged 67–68) Maury County, Tennessee

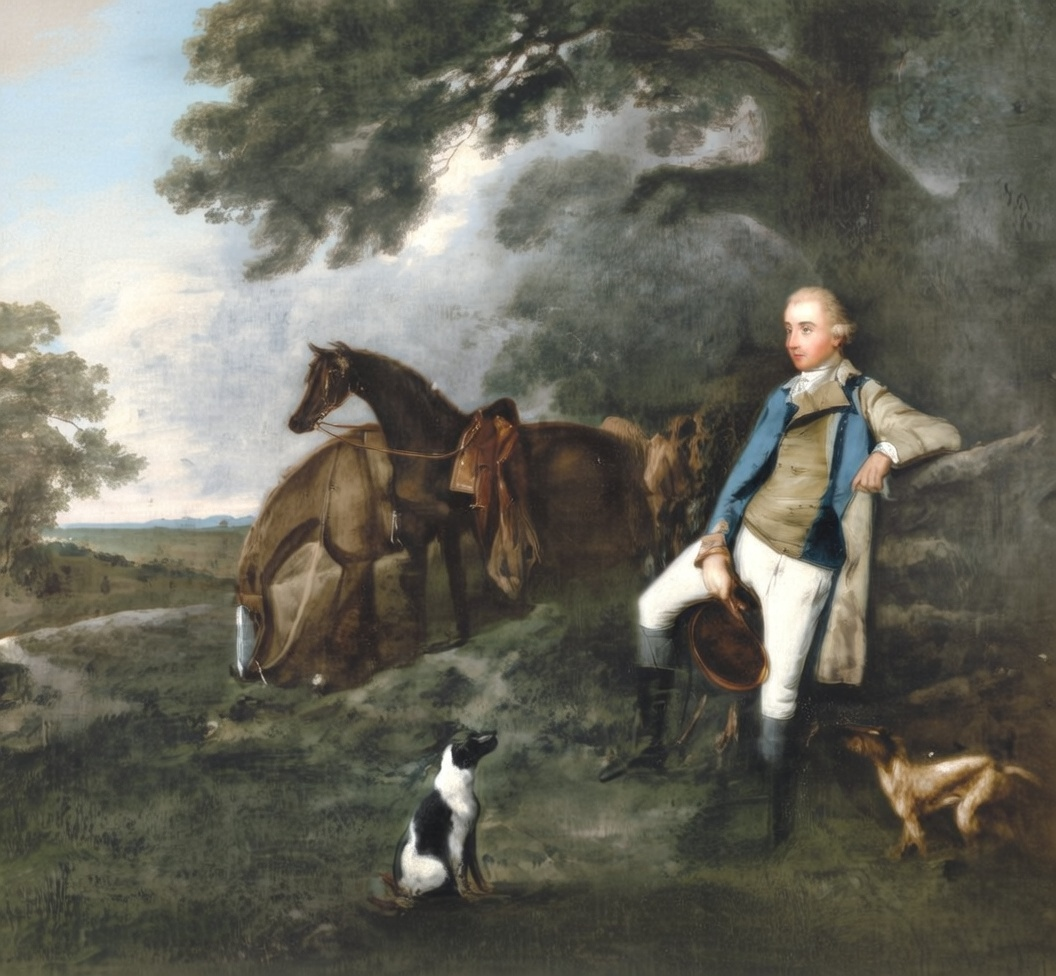
Richard Winn

Richard Winn (1750 – December 19, 1818) was an American politician, military officer, surveyor, and merchant. He served as a general in the South Carolina militia during and after the American Revolutionary War and represented South Carolina in both state and federal government.

== Early life and family ==
Richard Winn was born in 1750 in Fauquier County, Virginia. He was one of the children of Minor Winn and Margaret Conner Winn, a family that traced its American roots to early Welsh migration.

He moved south with his brothers John and William, first to Georgia and then to Fairfield County, South Carolina, where he worked as a land surveyor and merchant.

He married Priscilla McKennie, and the couple raised eleven children to adulthood.

== Revolutionary War ==
At the start of the American Revolutionary War, Winn received a commission as a lieutenant in the Third South Carolina Regiment and participated in early actions in defense of the Southern colonies.

He later served with the South Carolina militia under leaders such as General Thomas Sumter. Winn was severely wounded at the battle of Hanging Rock in 1780 but returned to service after his recovery.

After the war, he continued his service in the state militia and was appointed brigadier general and later major general of the South Carolina militia.

== Political career ==
Winn was a member of the South Carolina General Assembly from 1779 to 1786.

In 1778, he was appointed superintendent of Indian affairs for the Southern District of South Carolina.

He was elected as a Representative from South Carolina to the U.S. House of Representatives, serving in the Third and Fourth Congresses from March 4, 1793, to March 3, 1797.

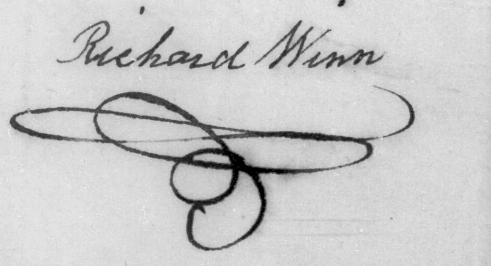
Signature of Richard Winn

Winn later returned to Congress following a special election and served from January 24, 1803, to March 3, 1813.

Between his congressional terms, he served as Lieutenant Governor of South Carolina from December 4, 1800, to December 8, 1802.

== Founding of Winnsboro ==
Winn was among the chief petitioners who laid out and chartered the village that later became Winnsboro, South Carolina. The land on which the town developed included a large tract originally owned by him.

According to local history, the settlement was known as “Winnsborough” as early as 1777 due to his position as a major landowner and emerged formally under that name in 1785 through the efforts of Richard, John Winn, and John Vanderhorst.

== Later life and death ==
After his final term in Congress, Winn relocated his family to a large tract along the Duck River in Maury County, Tennessee, where he continued in planting and mercantile pursuits.

He died on December 19, 1818, on his Tennessee property. The exact location of his burial is uncertain; however, it was historically reported to be in Fairfield County, South Carolina, with some memorialization in Greenwood Cemetery in Columbia, Tennessee.
