= Ezekiel Pickens =

American lawyer and politician

Ezekiel Pickens (March 30, 1768 – May 22, 1813) was an American lawyer and politician; he served as the 20th lieutenant governor of South Carolina from 1802 to 1804.

Pickens was the second of twelve children of General Andrew Pickens (1739-1817) and his wife Rebecca (Calhoun). Ezekiel was born at the family home near Abbeville, South Carolina; the family moved to the Hopewell plantation by 1785 (near the modern site of Clemson University), where Ezekiel was tutored in preparation for college. Pickens graduated third in his class at Princeton in 1790 and gave the valedictorian's address.

Returning to South Carolina, Pickens studied law and was admitted to the bar in 1793. A member of the Democratic-Republican Party, he represented the Pendleton District in the South Carolina House of Representatives from 1791 to 1794 and St. Thomas and St. Denis parishes in 1801 and 1802.

Pickens served as lieutenant governor of South Carolina from 1802 to 1804 under governor James Burchill Richardson.

== Family ==
Pickens' family were land speculators and leaders of the western South Carolina settlers. His father Andrew was a delegate to the Constitutional Convention and was a United States representative from 1793 to 1795. His younger brother Andrew Pickens was governor from 1816 to 1818. His aunt Floride Bonneau (~1761-1836) married John E. Colhoun, a long-time member of the South Carolina House who served as a US Senator from 1801 until his death in 1802. Their daughter Floride Bonneau Colhoun (Ezekiel Picken's first cousin) married John C. Calhoun, Vice President from 1825 to 1832.

Ezekiel married Elizabeth Bonneau (1764-about 1806). Their children were Judge Ezekiel Pickens (1794-1860), Elizabeth Bonneau Pickens (1797-1834) (wife of Governor Patrick Noble), Andrew Pickens (1799-1801), and Samuel Bonneau Pickens (1801-1851). Elizabeth Bonneau died sometime after Samuel's birth and Ezekiel remarried to Elizabeth Barksdale (1782-1859), daughter of a wealthy coastal rice planter. Their children were twins Col. Thomas Jones Pickens and Martha Barksdale Pickens, born in 1808, and Major Andrew Calhoun Pickens, born 1810.

He was a great-great-grandfather of businessman T. Boone Pickens.

Political offices
Preceded by Richard Winn	Lieutenant Governor of South Carolina; 1802–1804	Succeeded by Thomas Sumter Jr.
