= James Burchill Richardson =

American politician (1770–1836)

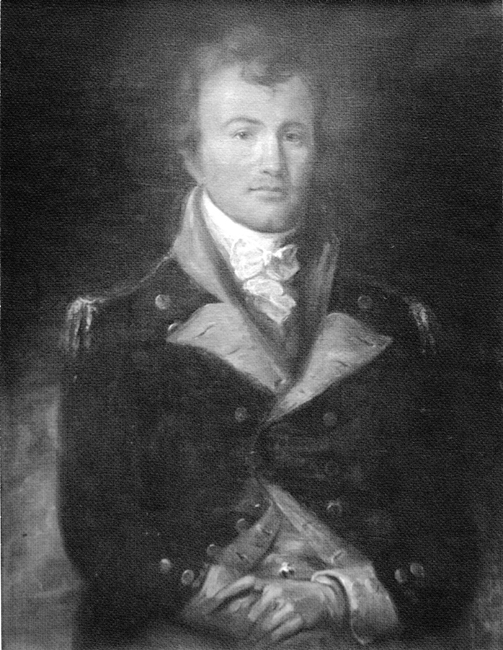

41st Governor of South Carolina
- In office December 8, 1802 – December 7, 1804
- Lieutenant: Ezekiel Pickens
- Preceded by: John Drayton
- Succeeded by: Paul Hamilton

Member of the South Carolina House of Representatives from Clarendon District
- In office November 25, 1816 – November 23, 1818
- In office November 26, 1804 – November 24, 1806
- In office November 26, 1792 – December 8, 1802

President pro tempore of the South Carolina Senate
- In office September 15, 1813 – September 24, 1813
- Preceded by: Samuel Warren
- Succeeded by: Savage Smith

Member of the South Carolina Senate from Clarendon District
- In office November 26, 1810 – December 8, 1813

Member of the South Carolina Senate from Claremont and Clarendon District
- In office November 24, 1806 – November 26, 1810

Personal details
- Born: October 28, 1770 Clarendon County, South Carolina
- Died: April 28, 1836 (aged 65) Clarendon County, South Carolina, US
- Party: Democratic-Republican

James Burchill Richardson (October 28, 1770 – April 28, 1836) was the 41st governor of South Carolina from 1802 to 1804.

== Family ==
Born in Clarendon County to Brigadier General Richard Richardson (general), a famed Revolutionary War leader, and Dorothy Sinkler. He received his education at the local schools in Clarendon County. He afterwards became a planter at the Richardsons' Big Home Plantation.

== Political career ==
In 1792, Richardson was elected to the South Carolina House of Representatives and served for ten years. The General Assembly chose him to be Governor of South Carolina in 1802 for a two-year term. During his time as governor, the legislature repealed laws against the traffic of slaves, but prohibited the importation of slaves under the age of fifteen from other states.

Upon leaving the governorship in 1804, Richardson returned as a member of the state House of Representatives. He won election to the South Carolina Senate in 1806 and served until 1814. From 1816 to 1818, Richardson was a member of the state House of Representatives for a third and final time. He spent the rest of his life on his plantation where he died on April 28, 1836.

Political offices
Preceded by John Drayton	Governor of South Carolina; 1802–1804	Succeeded by Paul Hamilton
