= Timeline of the history of the United States (1790–1819) =

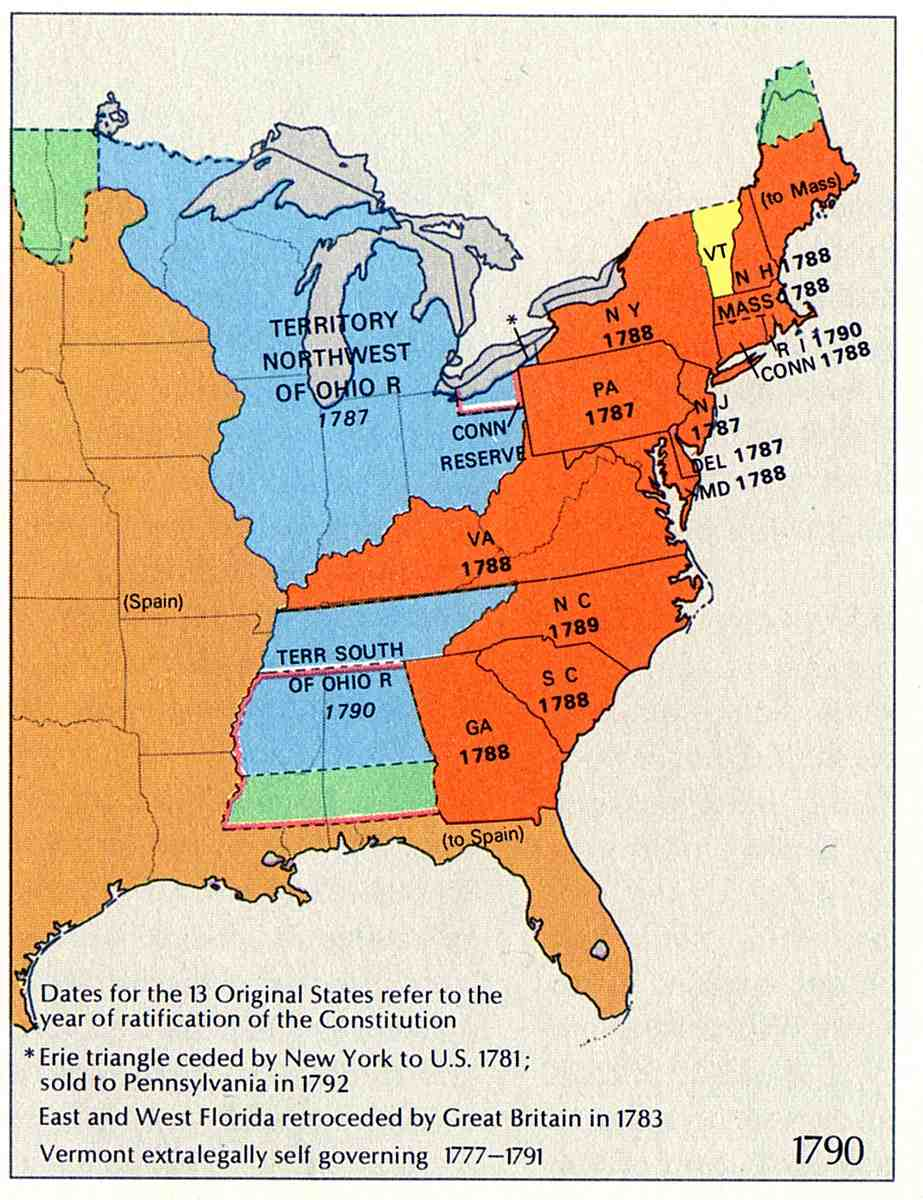
U.S. territorial extent in 1790

This section of the timeline of United States history concerns events from 1790 to 1819.

== 1790s ==
- 1790 – Rhode Island ratifies the Constitution and becomes 13th state
- 1791 – The Bill of Rights, comprising the first ten amendments to the Constitution, is adopted.
- 1791 – First Bank of the United States chartered
- 1791 – Vermont becomes the 14th state (formerly the independent Vermont Republic)
- 1792 – Kentucky becomes the 15th state (formerly Kentucky County, Virginia)
- 1792 – 1792 United States presidential election: George Washington reelected president, John Adams reelected vice president
- 1793 – Eli Whitney invents cotton gin
- March 4, 1793 – President Washington and Vice President Adams begin second terms
- 1793 – Yellow fever outbreak in Philadelphia
- 1793 – Fugitive Slave Act passed
- 1793 – Chisholm v. Georgia (2 US 419 1793) paves way for passage of 11th Amendment
- 1794 – Whiskey Rebellion
- 1794 – Battle of Fallen Timbers
- 1795 – Treaty of Greenville
- 1795 – Jay's Treaty
- 1795 – 11th Amendment "ratified by 12 of the then 15 states"
- 1795 – Pinckney's Treaty (also called Treaty of San Lorenzo)
- 1796 – Tennessee becomes the 16th state (formerly part of North Carolina)
- 1796 – Treaty of Tripoli
- 1796 – 1796 United States presidential election: John Adams is elected president, Thomas Jefferson vice president

=== Presidency of John Adams ===
- March 4, 1797 – John Adams becomes the second president, in Philadelphia; Thomas Jefferson becomes the second vice president
- 1798 – Alien and Sedition Acts
- 1798 – the Quasi-War starts
- 1798 and 1799 – Virginia and Kentucky Resolutions
- 1798 – Charles Brockden Brown's novel Wieland published
- 1799 – Charles Brockden Brown's novel Edgar Huntly published
- 1799 – Fries's Rebellion
- 1799 – Logan Act
- 1799 – George Washington dies

== 1800s ==
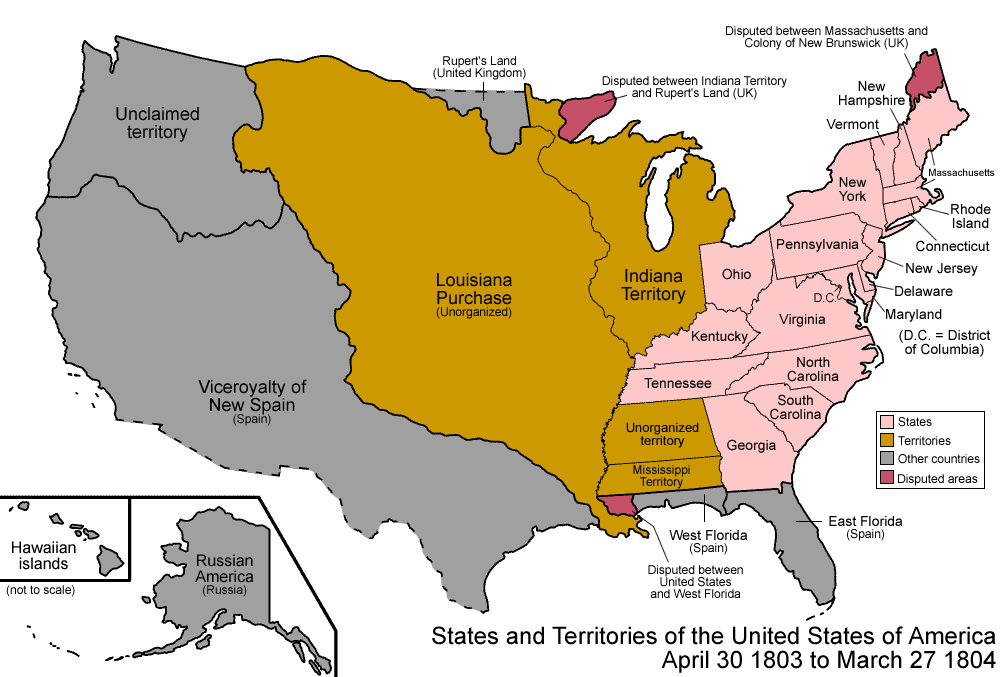
Louisiana Purchase

- 1800 – Library of Congress founded
- 1800 – Convention of 1800 ends the Quasi-War
- 1800 – 1800 United States presidential election: Thomas Jefferson and Aaron Burr tie in the Electoral College.
- 1801 – Thomas Jefferson elected president by the House of Representatives; Aaron Burr elected vice president.
- 1801 – President Adams appoints John Marshall Chief Justice

=== Presidency of Thomas Jefferson ===
- March 4, 1801 – Jefferson becomes the third president; Burr becomes the third vice president
- 1803 – Marbury v. Madison (5 US 137 1803) allows Supreme Court to invalidate law passed by the United States Congress for first time: the Judiciary Act of 1789
- 1803 – Louisiana Purchase
- 1803 – Ohio, formerly part of Connecticut, becomes the 17th state
- 1804 – 12th Amendment ratified
- 1804 – New Jersey abolishes slavery
- 1804 – Burr–Hamilton duel (Alexander Hamilton dies)
- 1804 – Lewis and Clark set out
- 1804 – 1804 United States presidential election: Thomas Jefferson reelected president; George Clinton elected vice president
- March 4, 1805 – President Jefferson begins second term; Clinton becomes the fourth vice president
- 1807 – Embargo Act of 1807
- 1807 – Robert Fulton invents steamboat
- 1807 – U.S. slave trade with Africa ends
- 1808 – 1808 United States presidential election: James Madison elected president, George Clinton reelected vice president

=== Presidency of James Madison ===
- March 4, 1809 – Madison becomes the fourth president; Vice President Clinton begins second term
- 1809 – Non-Intercourse Act (March 1)

== 1810s ==
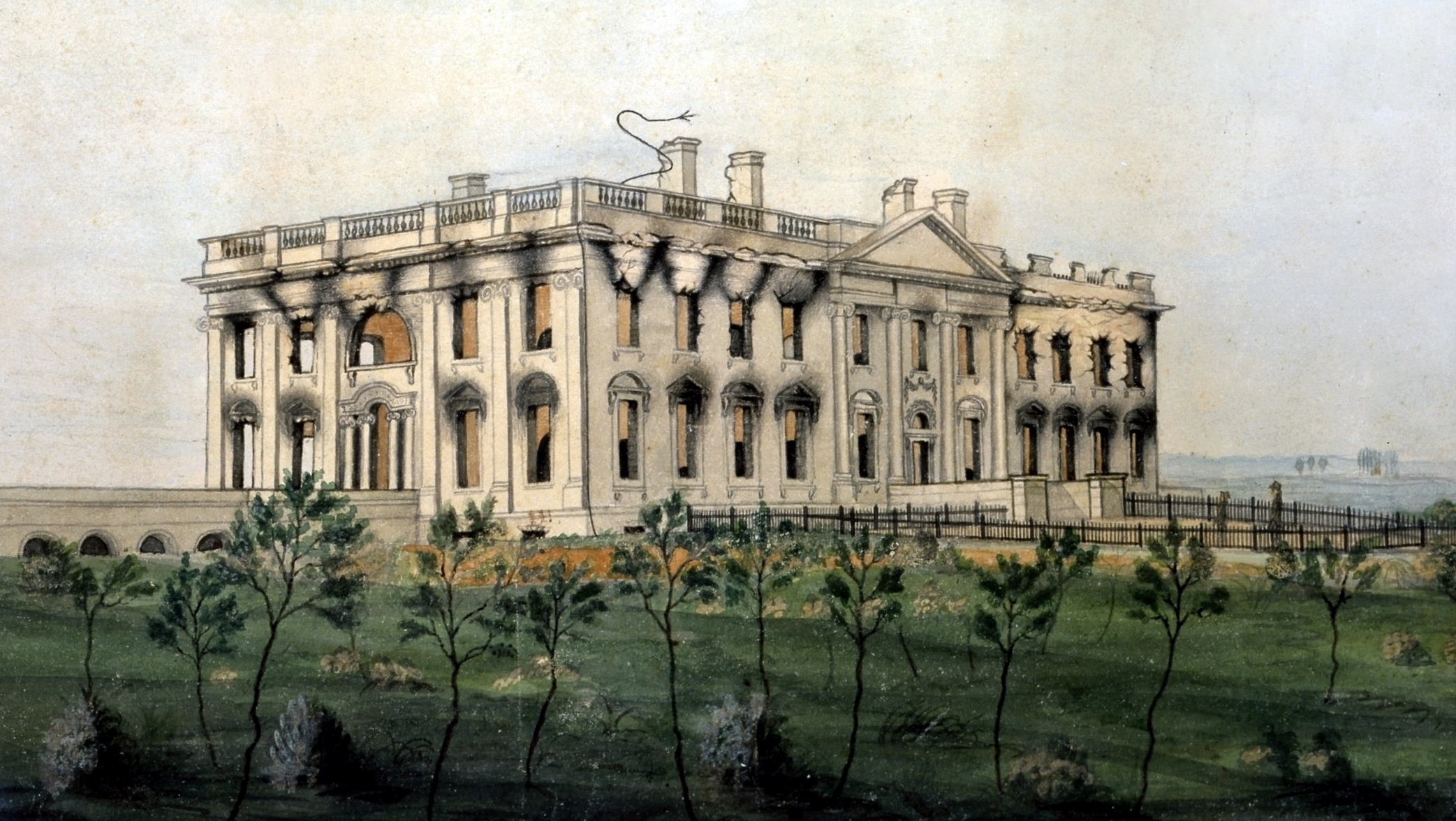
During the War of 1812, British troops burn Washington, D.C.

- 1810 – Fletcher v. Peck (10 US 87 1810) marks first time U.S. Supreme Court invalidates a state legislative act
- 1811 – First Bank of the United States charter expires
- April 20, 1812 – Vice President Clinton dies
- 1812 – War of 1812, an offshoot of the Napoleonic Wars, begins
- 1812 – Daniel Webster elected to the United States Congress
- 1812 – Louisiana becomes the 18th state
- 1812 – 1812 United States presidential election: James Madison reelected president; Elbridge Gerry elected vice president
- March 4, 1813 – President Madison begins second term; Gerry becomes the fifth vice president
- 1813-1814 - Creek War
- 1814 – British troops burn Washington, D.C., but are forced back at Baltimore
- November 23, 1814 – Vice President Gerry dies
- 1814 – Treaty of Ghent settles War of 1812
- 1815 – Battle of New Orleans
- 1816 – Indiana becomes the 19th state
- 1816 – Second Bank of the United States chartered
- 1816 – 1816 United States presidential election: James Monroe elected president, Daniel D. Tompkins vice president

=== Presidency of James Monroe ===
- March 4, 1817 – Monroe becomes the fifth president; Tompkins becomes the sixth vice president
- 1817 – Rush-Bagot Treaty
- 1817 – Harvard Law School founded
- 1817 – Mississippi becomes the 20th state
- 1818 – Cumberland Road opened
- 1818 – Illinois becomes the 21st state
- 1818 – Jackson Purchase in Kentucky
- 1819 – Panic of 1819
- 1819 – Adams-Onís Treaty, including acquisition of Florida
- 1819 – McCulloch v. Maryland (17 US 316 1819) prohibits state laws from infringing upon federal constitutional authority
- 1819 – Dartmouth College v. Woodward (17 US 518 1819) protects principle of honoring contracts and charters
- 1819 – Alabama becomes the 22nd state in the U.S.

== See also ==
- History of the United States (1789–1849)
- Timeline of the American Revolution
