= 1882 in the United States =

- Decades: 1860s; 1870s; 1880s; 1890s; 1900s
- See also: History of the United States (1865–1918); Timeline of United States history (1860–1899); List of years in the United States

Events from the year 1882 in the United States.

== Incumbents ==
=== Federal government ===
- President: Chester A. Arthur (R-New York)
- Vice President: vacant
- Chief Justice: Morrison Waite (Ohio)
- Speaker of the House of Representatives: J. Warren Keifer (R-Ohio)
- Congress: 47th

==== State governments ====
Governors and lieutenant governors

=== Governors ===
- Governor of Alabama: Rufus W. Cobb (Democratic) (until December 1), Edward A. O'Neal (Democratic) (starting December 1)
- Governor of Arkansas: Thomas James Churchill (Democratic)
- Governor of California: George Clement Perkins (Republican)
- Governor of Colorado: Frederick Walker Pitkin (Republican)
- Governor of Connecticut: Hobart B. Bigelow (Republican)
- Governor of Delaware: John W. Hall (Democratic)
- Governor of Florida: William D. Bloxham (Democratic)
- Governor of Georgia: Alfred H. Colquitt (Democratic) (until November 4), Alexander H. Stephens (Democratic) (starting November 4)
- Governor of Illinois: Shelby Moore Cullom (Republican)
- Governor of Indiana: Albert G. Porter (Republican)
- Governor of Iowa: John H. Gear (Republican) (until January 12), Buren R. Sherman (Republican) (starting January 12)
- Governor of Kansas: John P. St. John (Republican)
- Governor of Kentucky: Luke P. Blackburn (Democratic)
- Governor of Louisiana: Samuel D. McEnery (Democratic)
- Governor of Maine: Harris M. Plaisted (Democratic)
- Governor of Maryland: William T. Hamilton (Democratic)
- Governor of Massachusetts: John Davis Long (Republican)
- Governor of Michigan: David Jerome (Republican)
- Governor of Minnesota: John S. Pillsbury (Republican) (until January 10), Lucius F. Hubbard (Republican) (starting January 10)
- Governor of Mississippi: John M. Stone (Democratic) (until January 29), Robert Lowry (Democratic) (starting January 29)
- Governor of Missouri: Thomas Theodore Crittenden (Democratic)
- Governor of Nebraska: Albinus Nance (Republican)
- Governor of Nevada: John Henry Kinkead (Republican)
- Governor of New Hampshire: Charles H. Bell (Republican)
- Governor of New Jersey: George C. Ludlow (Democratic)
- Governor of New York: Alonzo B. Cornell (Republican) (until end of December 31)
- Governor of North Carolina: Thomas Jordan Jarvis (Democratic)
- Governor of Ohio: Charles Foster (Republican)
- Governor of Oregon: W. W. Thayer (Democratic) (until September 13), Z. F. Moody (Republican) (starting September 13)
- Governor of Pennsylvania: Henry M. Hoyt (Republican)
- Governor of Rhode Island: Alfred H. Littlefield (Republican)
- Governor of South Carolina: Johnson Hagood (Democratic) (until December 1), Hugh Smith Thompson (Democratic) (starting December 1)
- Governor of Tennessee: Alvin Hawkins (Republican)
- Governor of Texas: Oran M. Roberts (Democratic)
- Governor of Vermont: Roswell Farnham (Republican) (until October 5), John L. Barstow (Republican) (starting October 5)
- Governor of Virginia: Frederick W. M. Holliday (Democratic) (until January 1), William E. Cameron (Re-adjuster) (starting January 1)
- Governor of West Virginia: Jacob B. Jackson (Democratic)
- Governor of Wisconsin: William E. Smith (Republican) (until January 2), Jeremiah McLain Rusk (Republican) (starting January 2)

=== Lieutenant governors ===
- Lieutenant Governor of California: John Mansfield (Republican)
- Lieutenant Governor of Colorado: Horace Austin Warner Tabor (Republican)
- Lieutenant Governor of Connecticut: William H. Bulkeley (Republican)
- Lieutenant Governor of Florida: Livingston W. Bethel (no political party)
- Lieutenant Governor of Illinois: John Marshall Hamilton (Republican)
- Lieutenant Governor of Indiana: Thomas Hanna (Republican)
- Lieutenant Governor of Iowa: Frank T. Campbell (Republican) (until January 12), Orlando H. Manning (Republican) (starting January 12)
- Lieutenant Governor of Kansas: David Wesley Finney (Republican)
- Lieutenant Governor of Kentucky: James E. Cantrill (Democratic)
- Lieutenant Governor of Louisiana: George L. Walton (Democratic) (until month and day unknown), vacant (starting month and day unknown)
- Lieutenant Governor of Massachusetts: Byron Weston (Republican)
- Lieutenant Governor of Michigan: Moreau S. Crosby (Republican)
- Lieutenant Governor of Minnesota: Charles A. Gilman (Republican)
- Lieutenant Governor of Mississippi: William H. Sims (Democratic) (until month and day unknown), G. D. Shands (Democratic) (starting month and day unknown)
- Lieutenant Governor of Missouri: Robert Alexander Campbell (Democratic)
- Lieutenant Governor of Nebraska: Edmund C. Carns (Republican)
- Lieutenant Governor of Nevada: Jewett W. Adams (Democratic)
- Lieutenant Governor of New York: George Gilbert Hoskins (Republican) (until end of December 31)
- Lieutenant Governor of North Carolina: vacant (until month and day unknown), James L. Robinson (Democratic) (starting month and day unknown)
- Lieutenant Governor of Ohio: Andrew Hickenlooper (Republican) (until January 9), Rees G. Richards (Republican) (starting January 9)
- Lieutenant Governor of Pennsylvania: Charles Warren Stone (Republican)
- Lieutenant Governor of Rhode Island: Henry Fay (political party unknown)
- Lieutenant Governor of South Carolina: John D. Kennedy (Democratic) (until December 1), John Calhoun Sheppard (Democratic) (starting December 1)
- Lieutenant Governor of Tennessee: George H. Morgan (Democratic)
- Lieutenant Governor of Texas: Leonidas J. Storey (Democratic)
- Lieutenant Governor of Vermont: John L. Barstow (Republican) (until October 5), Samuel E. Pingree (Republican) (starting October 5)
- Lieutenant Governor of Virginia: James A. Walker (Democratic) (until January 1), John F. Lewis (Republican) (starting January 1)
- Lieutenant Governor of Wisconsin: James M. Bingham (Republican) (until January 2), Sam S. Fifield (Republican) (starting January 2)

== Events ==
=== January–March ===
- January 2
  - The Standard Oil Trust (monopoly) is secretly created to control multiple corporations set up by John D. Rockefeller and his associates.
  - Oscar Wilde arrives in the United States for an extended lecture tour.
- January 5 – Charles J. Guiteau is found guilty of the assassination of James A. Garfield (President of the United States), despite an insanity defense raised by his lawyer.
- January 13 – A train collision in New York City kills eight, including Webster Wagner, a New York state senator and founder of the luxury sleeper-car company bearing his name.
- March 18 – Morgan Earp is assassinated by outlaws while playing billiards in Tombstone, Arizona.
- March 22 – Polygamy is made a felony by the Edmunds Act passed by the United States Congress.
- March 29 – The Knights of Columbus, a Catholic fraternal service organization, is incorporated in New Haven, Connecticut by Father Michael J. McGivney.

=== April–June ===
- April 3 – Old West outlaw Jesse James is shot in the back of the head and killed by fellow outlaw Robert Ford in his home at St. Joseph, Missouri for reward.
- May 6 – The Chinese Exclusion Act, prohibiting the immigration of Chinese laborers, is the first significant law that restricts immigration into the U.S.
- June 30 – Charles J. Guiteau, the assassin of President James A. Garfield, is hanged.

=== July–September ===
- August 3 – The U.S. Congress passes the Immigration Act of 1882, imposing a head tax on arrivals in the U.S., excluding undesirable immigrants, and setting up a federal bureaucracy to manage immigration.
- August 5 – Standard Oil of New Jersey is established.
- September 4 – Thomas Edison starts the U.S.'s first commercial electrical power plant, lighting one square mile of lower Manhattan.
- September 5 – The first U.S. Labor Day parade is held in New York City.
- September 30 – The Vulcan Street Plant, the first hydroelectric central station to serve a system of private and commercial customers in North America, comes on stream in Appleton, Wisconsin.
- September – Redpath's McGee Illustrated Weekly newspaper changes its name to Redpath's Illustrated Weekly.

=== October–December ===
- October 5 – The Society for Ethical Culture of Chicago (the modern-day Ethical Humanist Society of Chicago) is founded by Felix Adler.
- October 16 – The New York, Chicago and St. Louis Railroad ("Nickel Plate Road") runs its first trains over the entire system between Buffalo, New York, and Chicago. Nine days later the Seney Syndicate sells the road to William Henry Vanderbilt for US$7.2 million.
- November 14 – Franklyn Leslie shoots Billy Claiborne dead in the streets of Tombstone, Arizona.
- December 22 – First string of Christmas lights created by Thomas Edison.

=== Undated ===
- Carolyn Merrick is elected president of the Woman's Christian Temperance Union.

=== Ongoing ===
- Gilded Age (1869–c. 1896)
- Depression of 1882–85 (1882–1885)

== Sport ==
- October 7 – The Chicago White Stockings even their series with the Cincinnati Red Stockings with a 2–0 victory. Cincinnati will drop out of the series under threats of expulsion by the American Association.
- December 6 – The National League formally admits the New York Gothams and the Philadelphia Quakers.

== Births ==
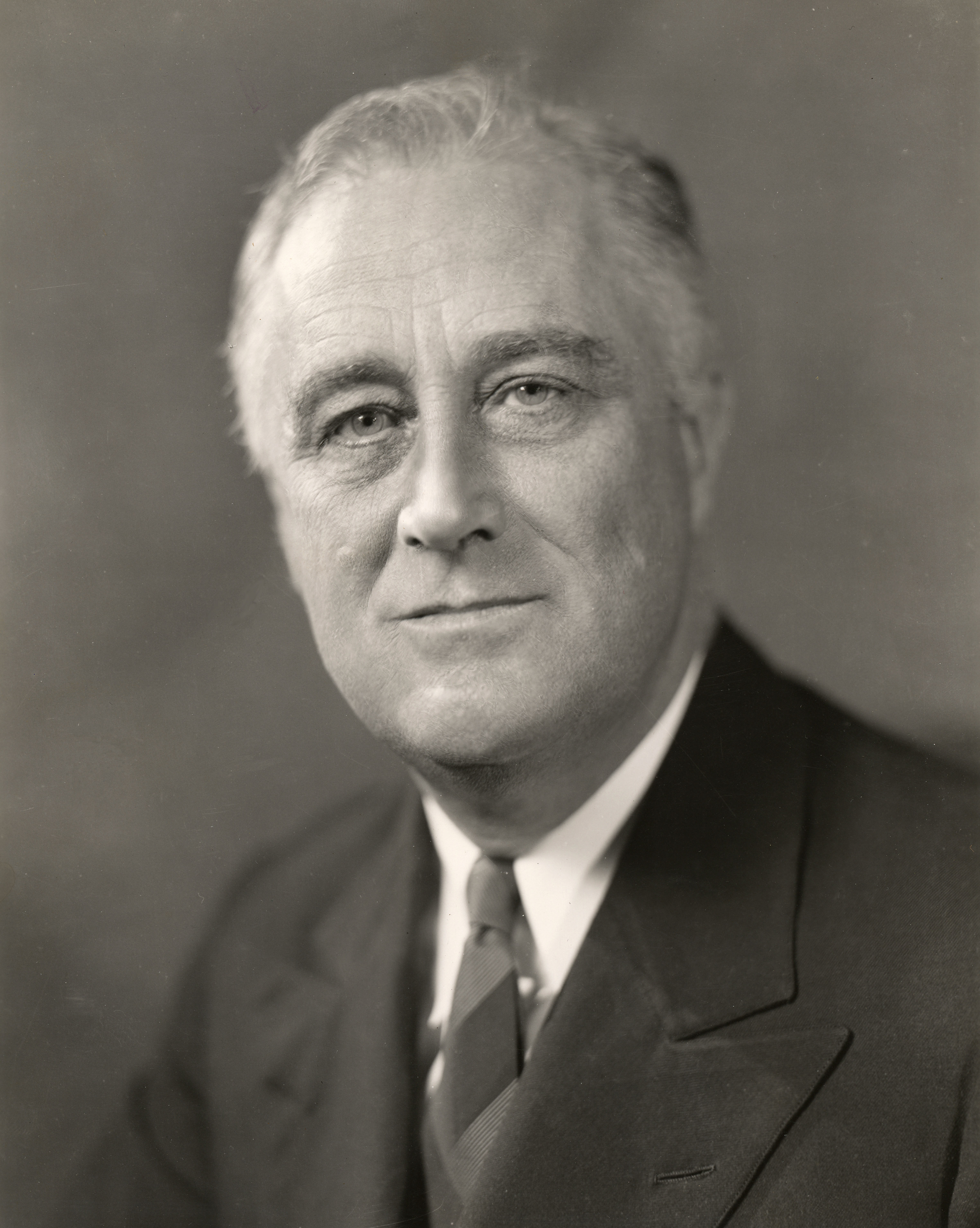
Franklin D. Roosevelt

- January 6 – Sam Rayburn, Speaker of the U.S. House of Representatives (died 1961)
- January 12 – Milton Sills, stage and film actor (died 1930)
- January 30 – Franklin D. Roosevelt, 32nd president of the United States, served from 1933 to 1945 (died 1945)
- February 8 – Thomas Selfridge, United States Army officer, first person killed in airplane crash (died 1908)
- February 18 – Sonora Smart Dodd, founder of Father's Day (died 1978)
- February 28 – Geraldine Farrar, operatic soprano and film actress (died 1967)
- May 9 – George Barker, painter (died 1965)
- May 23 – James Gleason, American actor, playwright, and screenwriter (died 1959)
- July 22 – Edward Hopper, painter (died 1967)
- July 24 – Lynn Thorndike, historian of medieval science and alchemy (died 1965)
- July 26 – Dixie Bibb Graves, U.S. Senator from Alabama from 1937 to 1938 (died 1965)
- September 1 – Georgina Jones, American tennis player (died 1955)
- September 12 – George L. Berry, U.S. Senator from Tennessee from 1937 to 1938 (died 1948)
- October 5 – Robert Goddard, rocket scientist (died 1945)
- October 14 – Éamon de Valera, third president of Ireland (died 1975 in Ireland)
- November 20 – Ethel May Halls, actress (died 1967)
- November 29 – Cattle Annie, outlaw with Little Britches (died 1978)

== Deaths ==
- January 3 – Clement Claiborne Clay, U.S. Senator from Alabama from 1853 to 1862, Confederate States Senator from Alabama from 1862 to 1864 (born 1816)
- January 30 – Henry Whitney Bellows, clergyman of the Unitarian Church (born 1814)
- February 25 – James Bates, U.S. Representative from Maine from 1831 to 1833 (born 1789)
- March 4 – Milton Latham, U.S. Senator from California from 1860 to 1863 (born 1827)
- March 24 – Henry Wadsworth Longfellow, poet and professor, dies of peritonitis in his Cambridge home (born 1807)
- April 27 – Ralph Waldo Emerson, essayist and poet (born 1803)
- June 30 – Charles Guiteau, assassin of President James A. Garfield (hung) (born 1841)
- July 16 – Mary Todd Lincoln, First Lady of the United States (born 1818)
- July 19 – George N. Stearns, founder of E. C. Stearns & Company (born 1812)
- July 23 – George Perkins Marsh, diplomat, philologist and pioneer environmentalist (born 1801)
- August 8 – Gouverneur K. Warren, civil engineer and Union Army general in the American Civil War (born 1830)
- August 16 – Benjamin Harvey Hill, U.S. Senator from Georgia from 1877 to 1882 (born 1823)
- September 27 – Fernando C. Beaman, teacher, lawyer and politician from Michigan (born 1814)
- November 5 – Robert Woodward Barnwell, U.S. Senator from South Carolina from 1862 to 1865 (born 1801)
- November 8 – Richard Arnold, Union Army brigadier general (born 1828)
- December 10 – Alexander Gardner, Scottish-born Civil War photographer (born 1821)
- December 12 – Robert Morris, abolitionist and one of the first African American lawyers (born 1823)

== See also ==
- Timeline of United States history (1860–1899)
