= 1812 in the United States =

- Decades: 1790s; 1800s; 1810s; 1820s; 1830s
- See also: History of the United States (1789–1849); Timeline of United States history (1790–1819); List of years in the United States

The following is a partial list of events from the year 1812 in the United States. After years of increasing tensions, the United States declares war on the British Empire, starting the War of 1812.

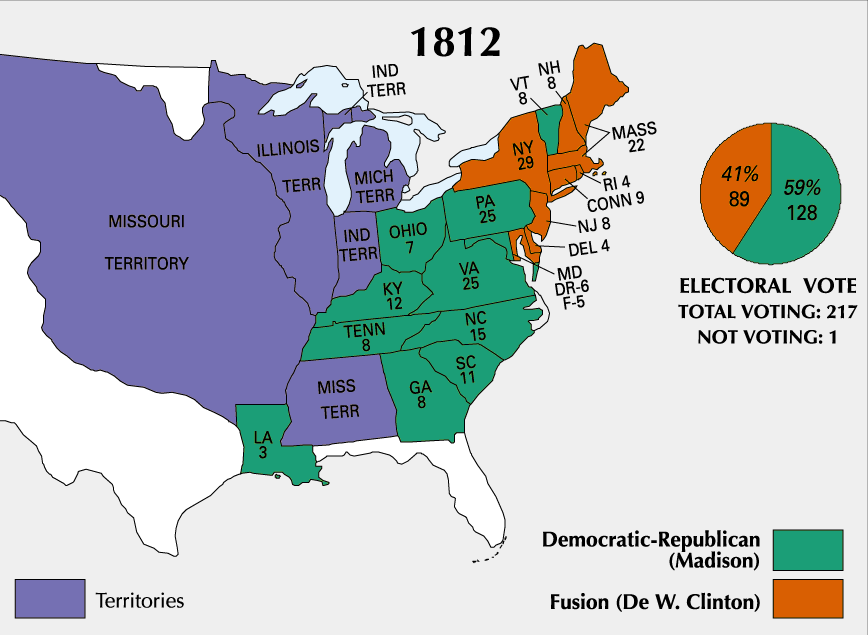
Results from the 1812 U.S. presidential election

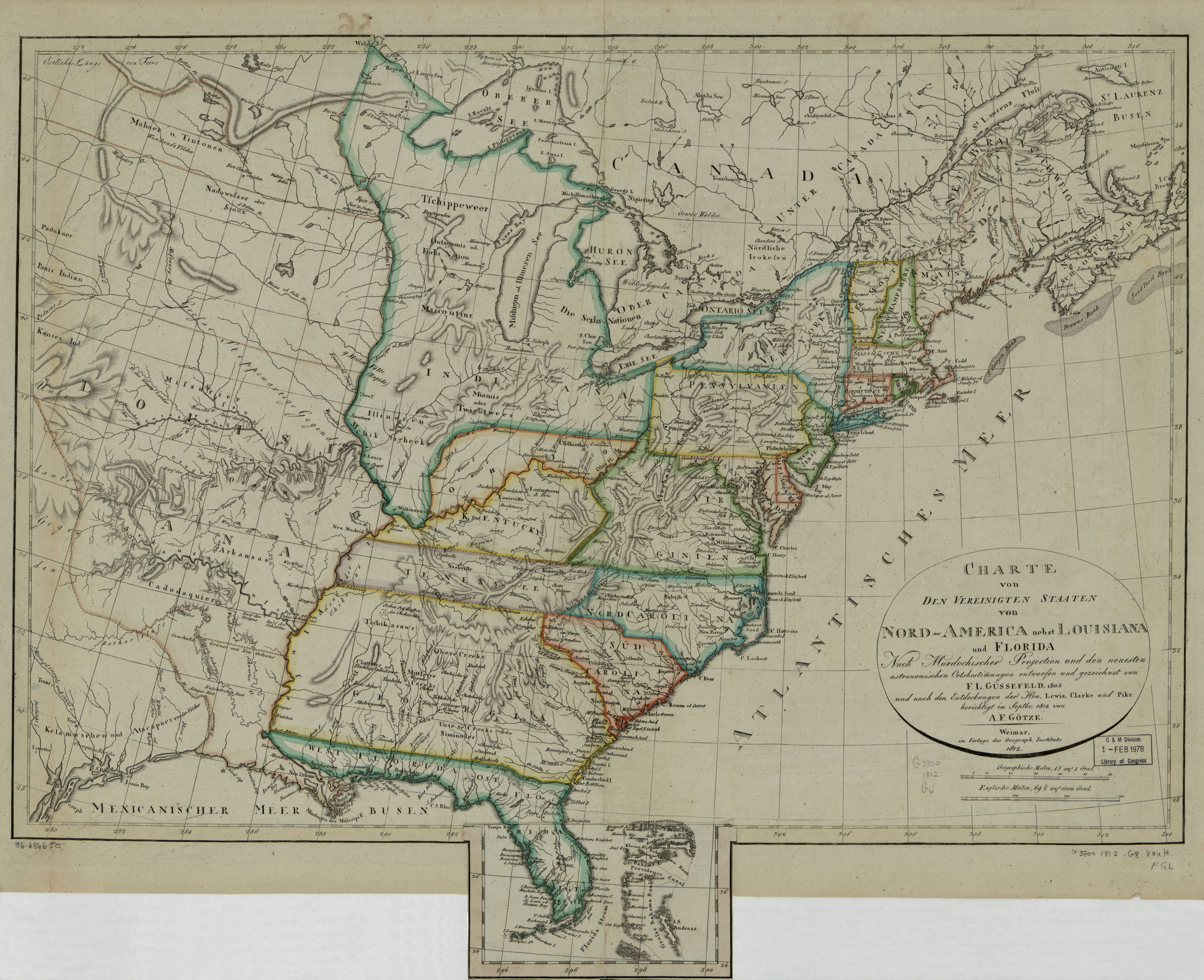
Political map of the United States published in 1812.

== Incumbents ==
=== Federal government ===
- President: James Madison (DR-Virginia)
- Vice President:

George Clinton (DR-New York) (until April 20)
vacant (starting April 20)

- Chief Justice: John Marshall (Virginia)
- Speaker of the House of Representatives: Henry Clay (DR-Kentucky)
- Congress: 12th

==== State governments ====
Governors and lieutenant governors

=== Governors ===
- Governor of Connecticut: Roger Griswold (Federalist) (until October 25), John Cotton Smith (Federalist) (starting October 25)
- Governor of Delaware: Joseph Haslet (Democratic-Republican)
- Governor of Georgia: David Brydie Mitchell (Democratic-Republican)
- Governor of Kentucky: Charles Scott (Democratic-Republican) (until August 24), Isaac Shelby (Democratic-Republican) (starting August 24)
- Governor of Louisiana: William C. C. Claiborne (Democratic-Republican) (starting April 30)
- Governor of Maryland: Robert Bowie (Democratic-Republican) (until November 25), Levin Winder (Federalist) (starting November 25)
- Governor of Massachusetts: Elbridge Gerry (Democratic-Republican) (until March 4), Caleb Strong (Federalist) (starting March 4)
- Governor of New Hampshire: John Langdon (Democratic-Republican) (until June 5), William Plumer (Democratic-Republican) (starting June 5)
- Governor of New Jersey: Joseph Bloomfield (Democratic-Republican) (until October 29), Aaron Ogden (Federalist) (starting October 29)
- Governor of New York: Daniel D. Tompkins (Democratic-Republican)
- Governor of North Carolina: William Hawkins (Democratic-Republican)
- Governor of Ohio: Return J. Meigs, Jr. (Democratic-Republican)
- Governor of Pennsylvania: Simon Snyder (Democratic-Republican)
- Governor of Rhode Island: William Jones (Federalist)
- Governor of South Carolina: Henry Middleton (Democratic-Republican) (until December 10), Joseph Alston (Democratic-Republican) (starting December 10)
- Governor of Tennessee: Willie Blount (Democratic-Republican)
- Governor of Vermont: Jonas Galusha (Democratic-Republican)
- Governor of Virginia: Peyton Randolph (Democratic-Republican) (until January 3), James Barbour (Democratic-Republican) (starting January 3)

=== Lieutenant governors ===
- Lieutenant Governor of Connecticut: John Cotton Smith (Federalist)
- Lieutenant Governor of Kentucky: Gabriel Slaughter (political party unknown) (until month and day unknown), Richard Hickman (political party unknown) (starting month and day unknown)
- Lieutenant Governor of Massachusetts: William Gray (political party unknown) (until month and day unknown), William Phillips, Jr. (political party unknown) (starting month and day unknown)
- Lieutenant Governor of New York: DeWitt Clinton (Democratic-Republican)
- Lieutenant Governor of Rhode Island: Simeon Martin (political party unknown)
- Lieutenant Governor of South Carolina: Samuel Farrow (Democratic-Republican) (until December 10), Eldred Simkins (Democratic-Republican) (starting December 10)
- Lieutenant Governor of Vermont: Paul Brigham (Democratic-Republican)

== Events ==
=== January–March ===
- January – The New England Journal of Medicine is first published in Boston by Dr John Collins Warren as the New England Journal of Medicine and Surgery and the Collateral Branches of Medical Science.
- January 10 – New Orleans, the first steamship on the Mississippi River, arrives in its namesake city, completing its maiden voyage.
- February 2 – Russia establishes a fur trading colony at Fort Ross, California.
- February 7 – The last of four major New Madrid earthquakes strike New Madrid, Missouri, with an estimated moment magnitude of over 8.
- March 26 – The Boston Gazette prints a political cartoon coining the term "Gerrymander" after former Massachusetts Governor Elbridge Gerry's approval (on February 11) of legislation creating oddly shaped electoral districts designed to help incumbents win re-election.

=== April–June ===
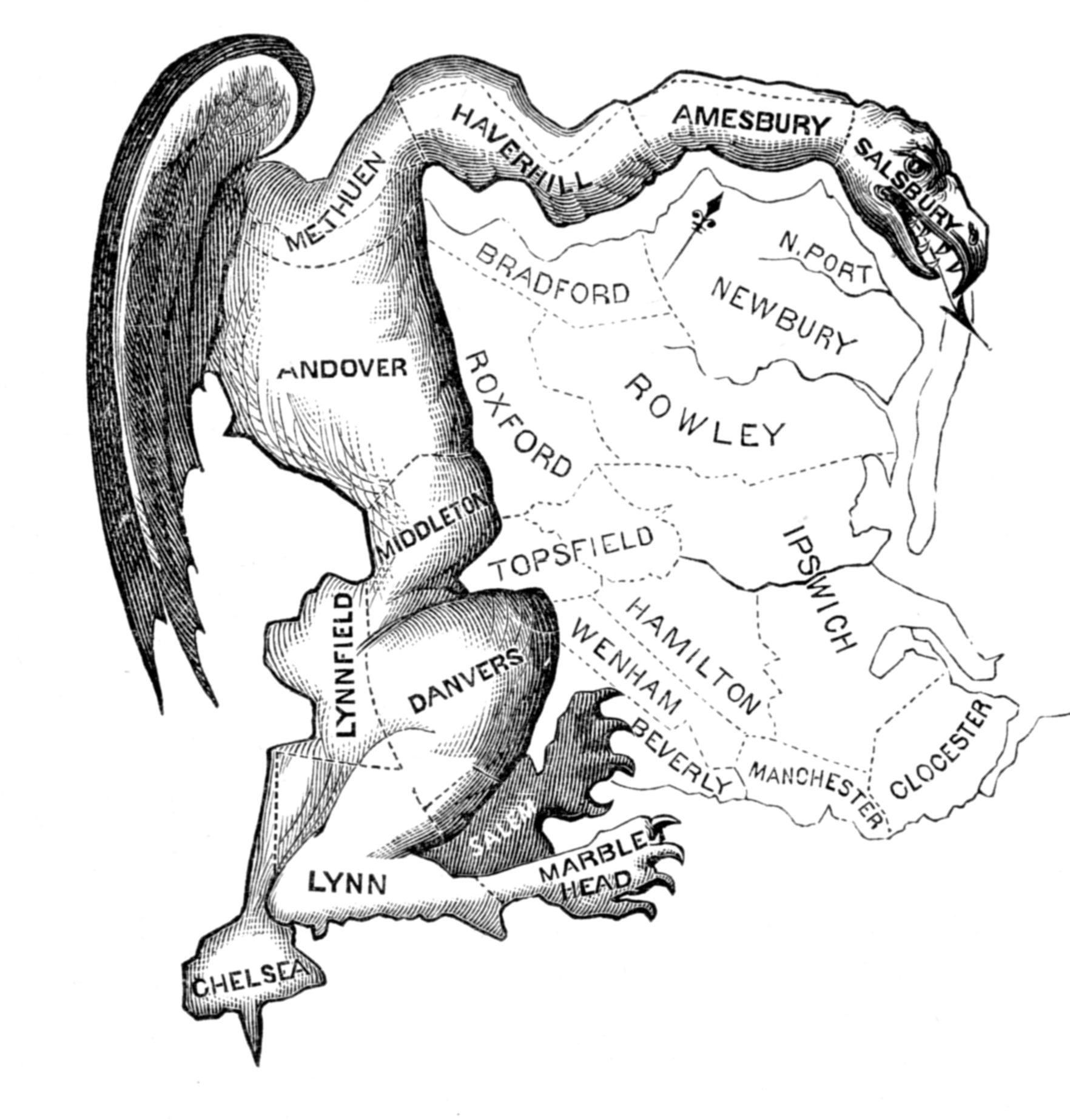
The original "Gerrymander"

- April 4 – U.S. President James Madison enacts a 90-day embargo on trade with the United Kingdom.
- April 20 – George Clinton, Vice President of the United States, dies in office.
- April 30 – Louisiana is admitted as the 18th U.S. state (see History of Louisiana).
- May 8 – Hail to the Chief is published.
- June 1 – War of 1812: U.S. President James Madison asks the U.S. Congress to declare war on Great Britain.
- June 4 – Following Louisiana's admittance as a U.S. state, the territory created by that name is renamed the Missouri Territory.
- June 18 – The War of 1812 begins between the United States and the British Empire.

=== July–September ===
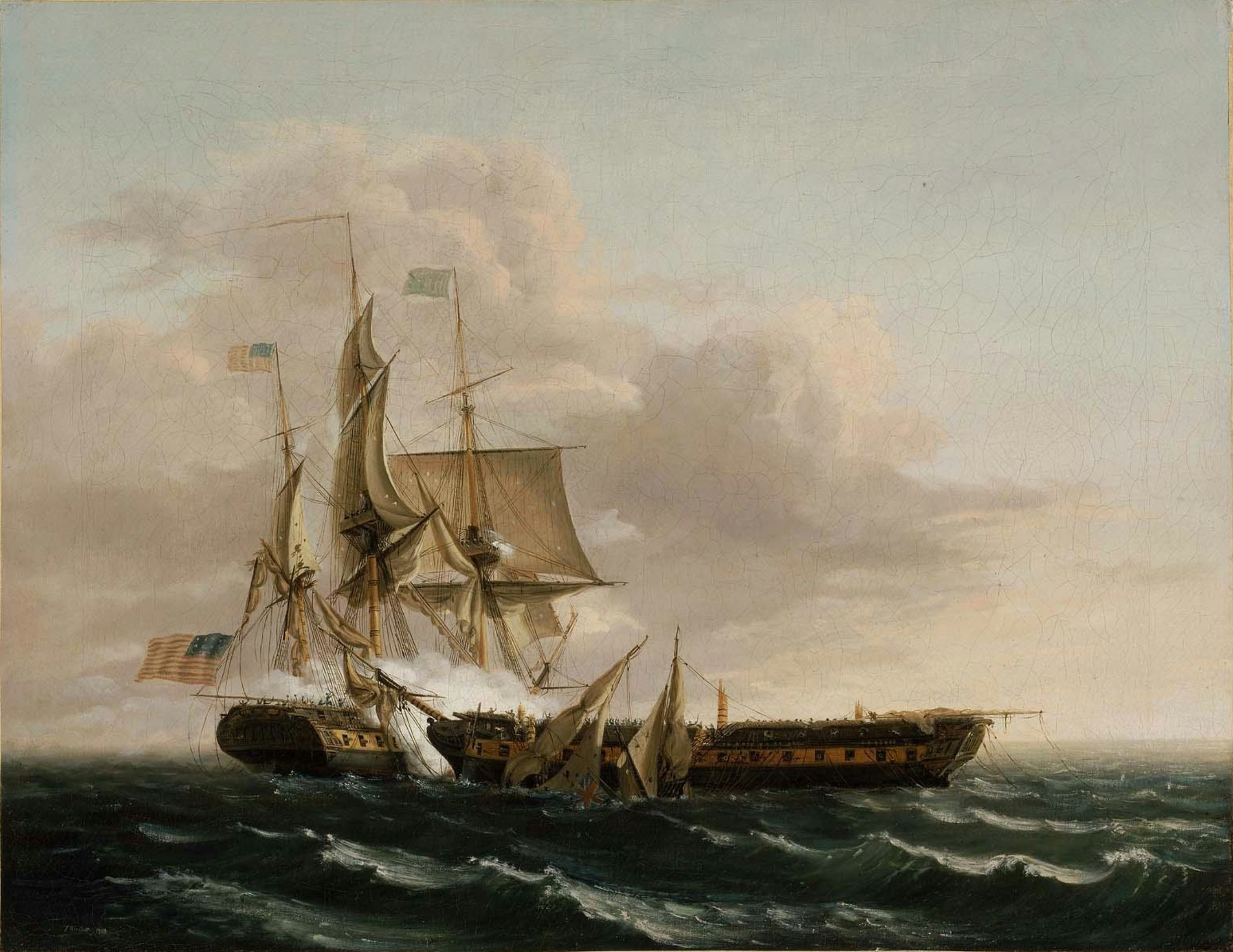
August 19: USS Constitution sinks HMS Guerriere

- July 12 – Americans invade Canada at Windsor, Upper Canada.
- August 5 – War of 1812: Tecumseh's Indian force ambushes Thomas Van Horne's 200 Americans at Brownstone Creek, causing them to flee and retreat.
- August 7 – 130 Filibusters of the Gutiérrez–Magee Expedition cross from Louisiana into Spanish Texas, soon after they capture the town of Nacogdoches.
- August 15 – War of 1812: Battle of Fort Dearborn – Potawatomi warriors overrun the U.S. fort in Illinois Territory.
- August 16 – War of 1812: American General William Hull surrenders Fort Detroit without a fight to the British Army.
- August 19 – War of 1812, USS Constitution vs HMS Guerriere: USS Constitution defeats the British frigate HMS Guerriere off the coast of Nova Scotia. The British shot is said to have bounced off Constitution's sides, earning her the nickname "Old Ironsides".
- September 13 – Gutiérrez–Magee Expedition: The Expedition, having since grown to 300 men, captures the town of Santísima Trinidad de Salcedo.

=== October–December ===
- October – The capital of Pennsylvania is permanently moved from Lancaster to Harrisburg.
- October 9 – War of 1812: American naval forces under Lieutenant Jesse Duncan Elliott capture two British warships, HMS Detroit and HMS Caledonia.
- October 13 – War of 1812 – Battle of Queenston Heights: As part of the Niagara campaign in Upper Canada, United States forces under General Stephen Van Rensselaer are repulsed from invading Canada by British and native troops led by Sir Isaac Brock (although he dies during the battle).
- November 5 – James Madison defeats DeWitt Clinton in the 1812 United States presidential election.
- November 13 – Gutiérrez-Magee Expedition: Manuel María de Salcedo, the governor of Spanish Texas, begins a four month long siege of Presidio La Bahia near Goliad. The siege continues until February 19, 1813.
- December 7 – Missouri Territory is effective.
- December 29 – War of 1812: USS Constitution defeats the British frigate HMS Java off the coast of Brazil.

=== Undated ===
- The Bishop James Madison Society is founded at the College of William & Mary, Williamsburg, Virginia.
- The City Bank of New York is founded.
- The United States General Land Office becomes an independent agency of the U.S. government, responsible for land in the public domain.
- The Williamsport Academy for the Education of Youth is founded in Pennsylvania.
- The Old Oscar Pepper Distillery (now the Woodford Reserve Distillery), the oldest Kentucky Bourbon distillery, is established along Glenn's Creek in Woodford County, Kentucky.
- Baptist Training Union now Wayland Baptist Theological Seminary is founded by Escaped and Free Slaves in Philadelphia, Pennsylvania.
- Princeton Theological Seminary is founded in New Jersey.

=== Ongoing ===
- War of 1812 (1812–1815)
- Gutiérrez–Magee Expedition (1812–1813)

== Births ==
- January 2 – Augustus C. Dodge, United States Senator from Iowa from 1848 to 1855 (died 1883)
- January 11 – Alexander H. Stephens, the only vice president of the Confederate States of America (died 1883)
- February 22 – John B. Weller, United States Senator from California from 1852 to 1857 (died 1875)
- February 15 – Charles Lewis Tiffany, founder of Tiffany & Co. (died 1902)
- February 16 – Henry Wilson, 18th vice president of the United States from 1873 to 1875 (died 1875)
- March 11 – James Speed, U.S. Attorney General from 1864 to 1866 under Presidents Abraham Lincoln and Andrew Johnson (died 1887)
- March 12 – Isaac P. Christiancy, Chief Justice of Michigan Supreme Court and U.S. Senator from Michigan from 1875 to 1879 (died 1890)
- March 13 – James E. English, United States Senator from Connecticut from 1875 to 1876 (died 1890)
- March 22 – Stephen Pearl Andrews, anarchist and proponent of pantarchy (died 1886)
- April 2 – Susan May Williams, railroad heiress who married a nephew of Emperor Napoleon I (died 1881)
- April 16 – Sarah Harris Fayerweather, African-American whose 1832 admission to a Connecticut school resulted in the first integrated schoolhouse (died 1878)
- May 4 – John W. Stevenson, United States Senator from Kentucky from 1871 to 1877 (died 1886)
- May 6 – Martin Delany, African-American abolitionist, journalist, and physician (died 1885)
- May 17 – Elias Nelson Conway, 5th Governor of Arkansas from 1852 to 1860 (died 1892)
- May 30 – John Alexander McClernand, lawyer, politician, and Union General during the American Civil War (died 1900)
- July 27 –
  - Thomas Lanier Clingman, North Carolina congressman, senator, and confederate general (died 1897)
  - Anna Cabot Quincy Waterston, writer of poems, novels, hymns, and a diary (died 1899)
- July 30 – Harrison Ludington, 13th Governor of Wisconsin from 1876 to 1878 (died 1891)
- August 11 – Joseph Projectus Machebeuf, French-American Catholic missionary and the first Bishop of Denver (died 1889)
- August 18 – John Hugh Means, 64th Governor of South Carolina from 1850 to 1852 (died 1862)
- August 22 – Joseph Mozier, American-born sculptor best known for his work in Italy. (died 1870)
- September 13 – John McMurtry, builder and architect (died 1890)
- September 18 – Herschel Vespasian Johnson, United States Senator from Georgia from 1863 to 1865 (died 1880)
- September 29 – George N. Stearns, founder of E. C. Stearns & Company (died 1882)
- October 1 – Stephen P. Hempstead, 2nd Governor of Iowa from 1850 to 1854. (died 1883)
- October 6 – Lazarus W. Powell, United States Senator from Kentucky from 1859 to 1865. (died 1867)
- October 9 – Almon W. Babbitt, Mormon pioneer and first secretary/treasurer of Utah Territory (died 1856)
- October 20 – Austin Flint, co-founder of Buffalo Medical College and president of the American Medical Association (died 1886)
- October 21 – David H. Armstrong, Canadian-born United States Senator from Missouri from 1877 to 1879 (died 1893)
- October 22 – James "Grizzly" Adams, mountain man and bear trainer (died 1860)
- November 1 – John Bernard Fitzpatrick, Bishop of Boston (died 1866)
- November 4 – Richard M. Bishop, 34th Governor of Ohio from 1878 to 1880 (died 1893)
- November 28 – George Ticknor Curtis, author, lawyer and historian (died 1894)
- December 18 – Jesse D. Bright, United States Senator from Indiana from 1845 to 1862 (died 1875)

=== Undated ===
- Stephen Mallory, United States Senator from Florida from 1851 to 1861 (died 1873)
- William K. Sebastian, United States Senator from Arkansas from 1848 to 1861 (died in 1865)

== Deaths ==
- April 19 – Toby Gilmore, formerly enslaved Continental Army veteran and land owner (born 1740s on the Guinea coast of Africa)
- April 20 – George Clinton, fourth vice president of the United States from 1805 to 1812 (born 1739)
- May 12 – Martha Ballard, diarist and midwife (born 1734 or 1735)
- May 15 – Hercules Posey, escaped from slavery at George Washington's Mount Vernon (b. c. 1748)
- June 17 – Jean La Lime, Victim of "the first murder in Chicago"; killed by John Kinzie
- December 20 – Sacagawea, Shoshone interpreter and guide on the Lewis and Clark Expedition (born c. 1788)
- December 24 – George Beck, artist and poet (born 1749)
- December 26 – Joel Barlow, poet (born 1754)

== See also ==
- Timeline of United States history (1790–1819)
- Worldwide events in 1812
- War of 1812
