= 1813 in the United States =

- Decades: 1790s; 1800s; 1810s; 1820s; 1830s
- See also: History of the United States (1789–1849); Timeline of United States history (1790–1819); List of years in the United States

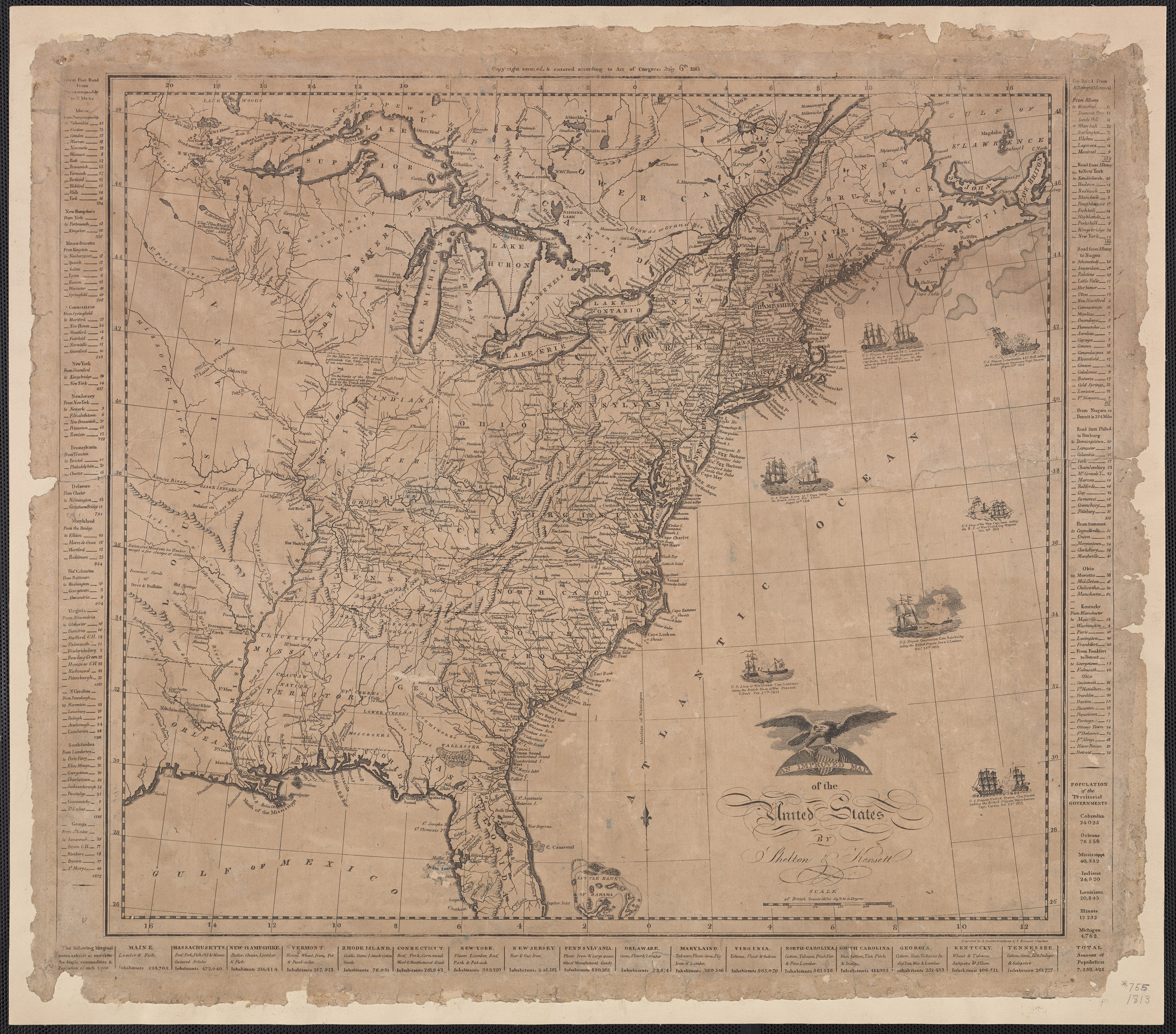
An improved Map of the United States by Shelton & Kensett, 1813

Events from the year 1813 in the United States.

== Incumbents ==
=== Federal government ===
- President: James Madison (DR-Virginia)
- Vice President:

vacant (until March 4)
Elbridge Gerry (DR-Massachusetts) (starting March 4)

- Chief Justice: John Marshall (Virginia)
- Speaker of the House of Representatives: Henry Clay (DR-Kentucky)
- Congress: 12th (until March 4), 13th (starting March 4)

==== State governments ====
Governors and lieutenant governors

=== Governors ===
- Governor of Connecticut: John Cotton Smith (Federalist)
- Governor of Delaware: Joseph Haslet (Democratic-Republican)
- Governor of Georgia: David Brydie Mitchell (Democratic-Republican) (until November 5), Peter Early (Democratic-Republican) (starting November 5)
- Governor of Kentucky: Isaac Shelby (Democratic-Republican)
- Governor of Louisiana: William C. C. Claiborne (Democratic-Republican)
- Governor of Maryland: Levin Winder (Federalist)
- Governor of Massachusetts: Caleb Strong (Federalist)
- Governor of New Hampshire: William Plumer (Democratic-Republican) (until June 3), John Taylor Gilman (Federalist) (starting June 3)
- Governor of New Jersey: Aaron Ogden (Federalist) (until October 29), William Sanford Pennington (Democratic-Republican) (starting October 29)
- Governor of New York: Daniel D. Tompkins (Democratic-Republican)
- Governor of North Carolina: William Hawkins (Democratic-Republican)
- Governor of Ohio: Return J. Meigs, Jr. (Democratic-Republican)
- Governor of Pennsylvania: Simon Snyder (Democratic-Republican)
- Governor of Rhode Island: William Jones (Federalist)
- Governor of South Carolina: Joseph Alston (Democratic-Republican)
- Governor of Tennessee: Willie Blount (Democratic-Republican)
- Governor of Vermont: Jonas Galusha (Democratic-Republican) (until October 23), Martin Chittenden (Federalist) (starting October 23)
- Governor of Virginia: James Barbour (Democratic-Republican)

=== Lieutenant governors ===
- Lieutenant Governor of Connecticut: John Cotton Smith (Federalist) (until May 13), Chauncey Goodrich (Federalist) (starting May 13)
- Lieutenant Governor of Kentucky: Richard Hickman (political party unknown)
- Lieutenant Governor of Massachusetts: William Phillips, Jr. (political party unknown)
- Lieutenant Governor of New York: DeWitt Clinton (Democratic-Republican)
- Lieutenant Governor of Rhode Island: Simeon Martin (political party unknown)
- Lieutenant Governor of South Carolina: Eldred Simkins (Democratic-Republican)
- Lieutenant Governor of Vermont: Paul Brigham (Democratic-Republican) (until October 23), William Chamberlain (Federalist) (starting October 23)

== Events ==
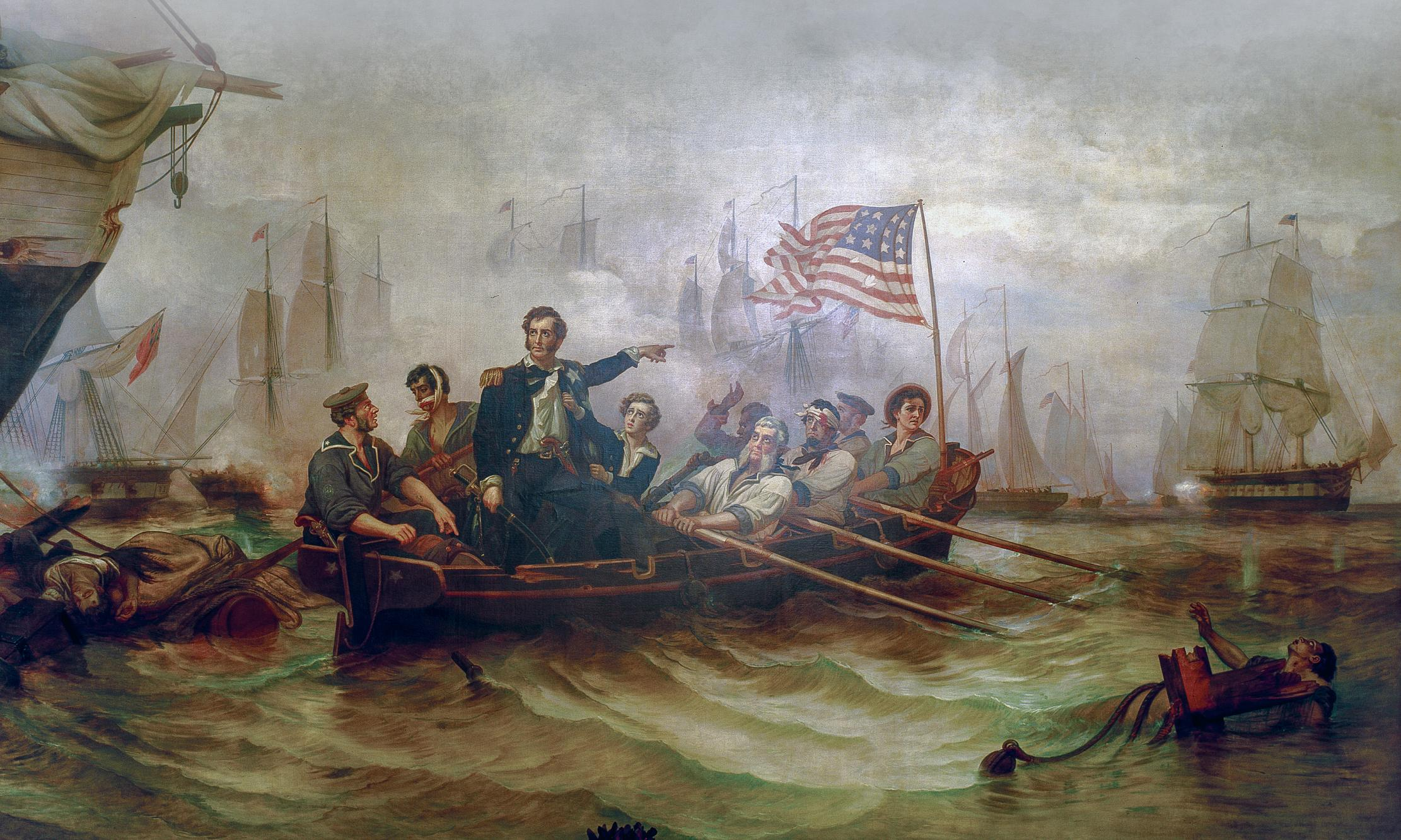
September 10: Battle of Lake Erie

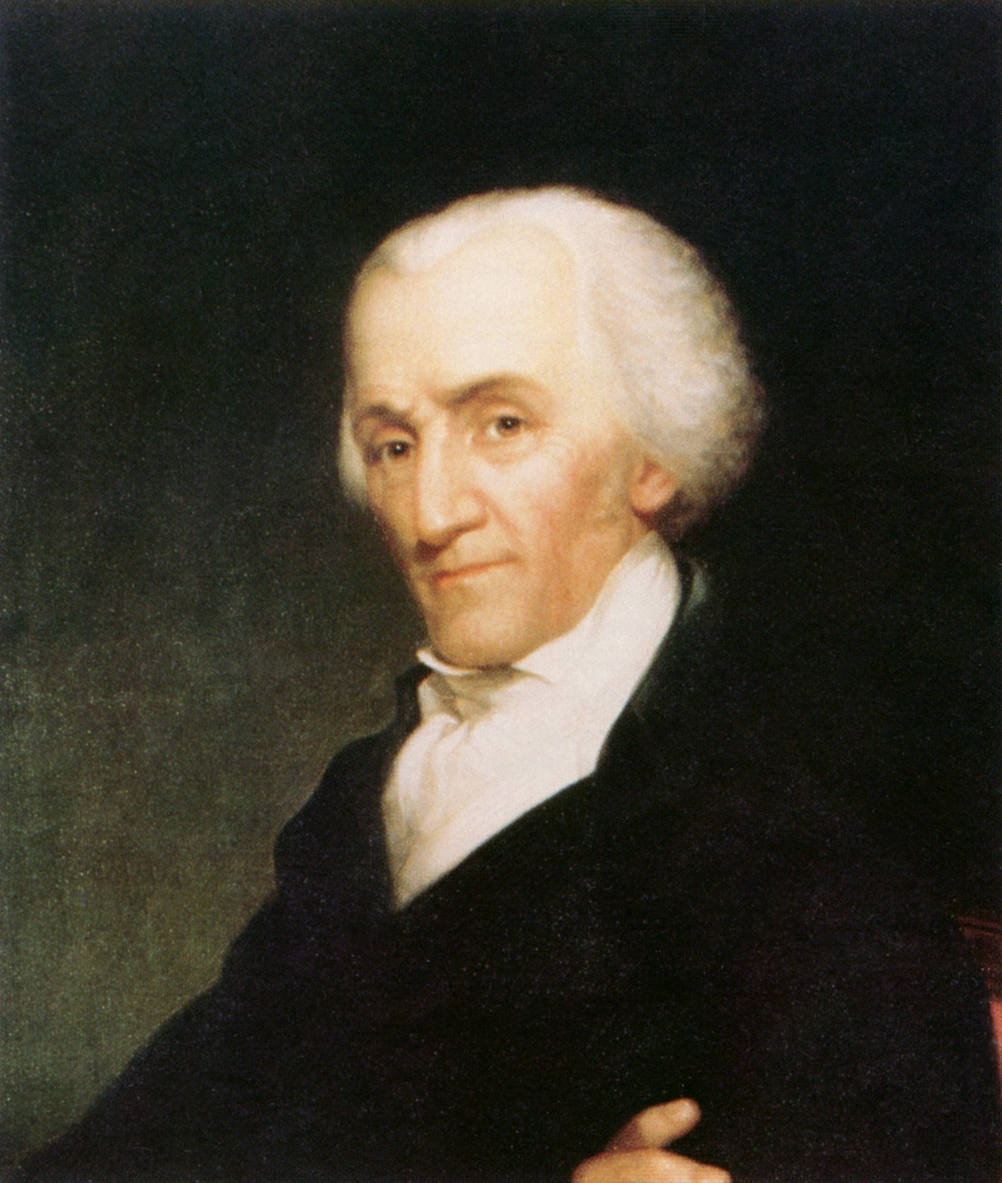
March 4: Elbridge Gerry becomes the fifth U.S. vice president

=== January–March ===
- February – War of 1812:
  - Construction of Fort Meigs in Ohio begins under the command of Major Amos Stoddard.
  - General Harrison sends out an expedition to burn the British vessels at Fort Malden by going across Lake Erie via the Bass Islands in sleighs, but the ice is not hard enough and the expedition returns.
- February 19 – Gutiérrez-Magee Expedition: Manuel María de Salcedo, the governor of Spanish Texas, lifts his four-months long siege of Presidio La Bahía in Goliad, Texas and turns towards San Antonio de Bexar, the Republican Army of the North holds the Presidio until July or August.
- March 4 – James Madison is sworn in as President of the United States for his second term, and Elbridge Gerry is sworn in as Vice President of the United States.
- March 22 – War of 1812: Col. Richard M. Johnson puts out an order for raising a regiment of mounted volunteers in Kentucky.
- March 29 – Mexican War of Independence – Battle of Rosillo Creek: The Republican Army of the North defeats the Spanish Royalist Army in present-day Bexar County, Texas, the Spanish forces retreat back to San Antonio.

=== April–June ===
- April 1 – The Spanish sign a treaty with Samuel Kemper, one of the leaders of the Republican Army of the North. Governor Manuel María de Salcedo and Simón de Herrera, the Governor of Nuevo León, are surrendered to the republicans. They and 12 other imprisoned Spanish leaders are taken back to the Rosillo Creek battle site and executed. This act is viewed with disdain by the majority of the Anglo-American leaders of the rebellion, and many Anglos leave the rebel army as a result.
- April 6 – Gutierrez de Lara drafts a declaration of independence, establishing the first Republic of Texas.
- April 27 – War of 1812 – Battle of York: United States troops raid and destroy but do not hold York, capital of Upper Canada (modern-day Toronto).
- May 1–9 – War of 1812: First Siege of Fort Meigs: British allied forces, under General Henry Proctor and Chief Tecumseh, lay siege to the fort but do not capture it.
- May 5 – War of 1812: "Dudley's Massacre": A detachment under Colonel William Dudley attempting to relieve the siege of Fort Meigs is decimated.
- May 27 – War of 1812: In Canada, American forces capture Fort George.
- June 1 – War of 1812: Capture of USS Chesapeake in Boston Harbor by British Royal Navy frigate HMS Shannon (1806).
- June 6 – War of 1812 – Battle of Stoney Creek: A British force of 700 under John Vincent defeat an American force three times its size under William H. Winder and John Chandler.
- June 20 – Battle of Alazan Creek: The Republican Army of the North defeats a Spanish force on the banks of the Alazán Creek, just west of San Antonio de Béxar.

=== July–September ===
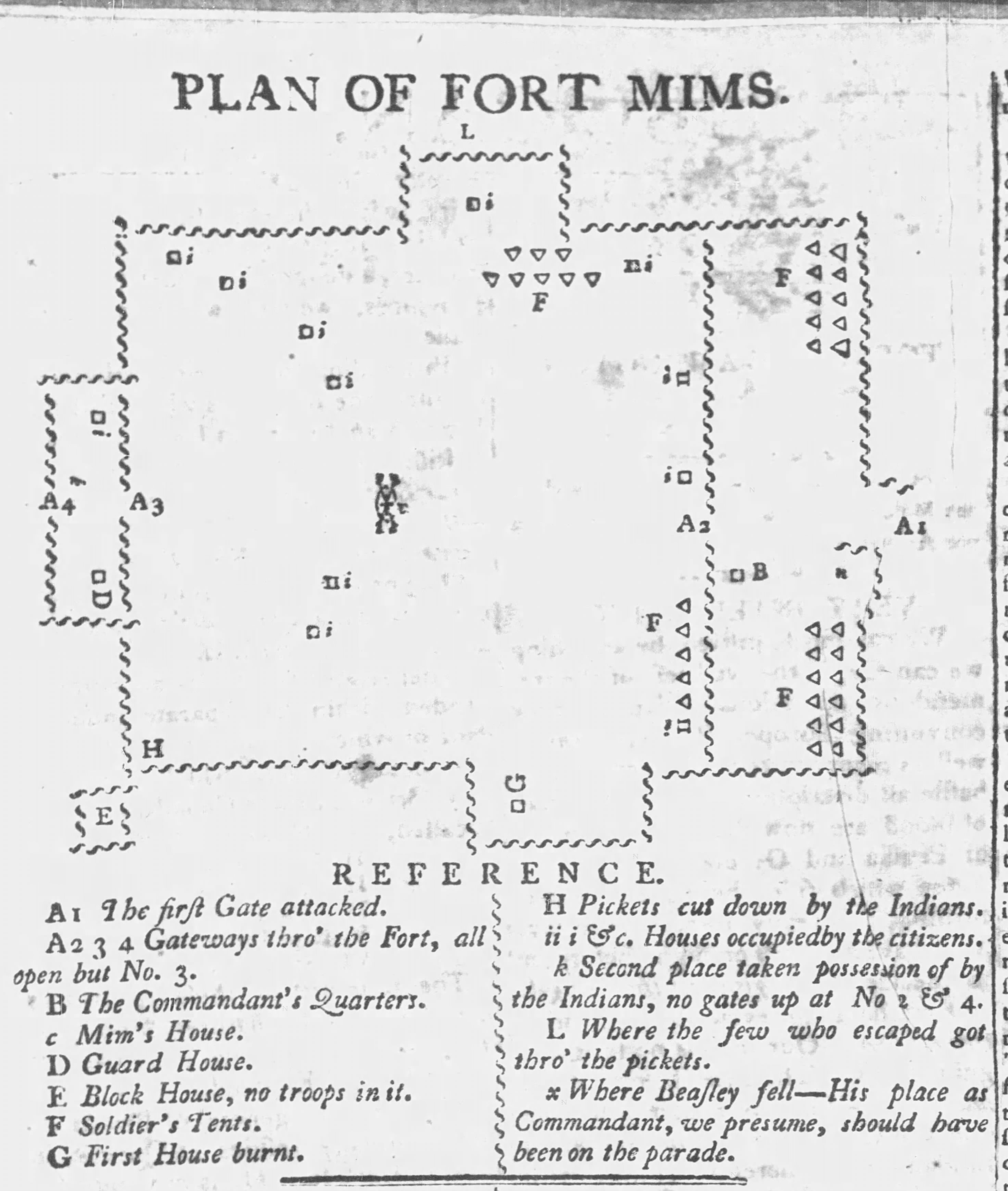
"Plan of Fort Mims" Natchez Gazette, December 1, 1813

- July – War of 1812: Second Siege of Fort Meigs fails to defeat General Green Clay.
- July 5 – War of 1812: Three weeks of British raids on Fort Schlosser, Black Rock and Plattsburgh, New York begin.
- August 18 – Battle of Medina: the Spanish authorities in Texas finally crush the Republican Army of the North at the Battle of Medina, about 20 miles south of San Antonio de Béxar, and the deadliest battle ever fought on Texan soil. This crushing defeat marks the final end of the Gutiérrez-Magee Expedition, a Filibustering expedition into Spanish Texas which had started the previous year.
- August 30 – Creek War – Fort Mims massacre: A force of Creeks belonging to the Red Sticks faction kill hundreds of settlers in Fort Mims in Alabama.
- September 4 – The Jackson-Benton tavern brawl in Nashville, Tennessee leaves Andrew Jackson with a gunshot wound.
- September 10 – War of 1812 – Battle of Lake Erie: An American squadron under Commodore Oliver Hazard Perry defeats a British squadron, capturing six ships.

=== October–December ===
- October 5 – War of 1812 – Battle of the Thames in Upper Canada: William Henry Harrison defeats the British, and Shawnee leader Tecumseh is killed in battle.
- October 26 – War of 1812 – Battle of Chateauguay: Charles de Salaberry defeats an American invasion
- November 11 – War of 1812 – Battle of Crysler's Farm: the Americans are defeated by the British.
- November 16 – The British announce a blockade of Long Island Sound, leaving only the New England coasts open to shipping.
- December 17 – A trade embargo comes into effect, aimed at New England merchants who have been supplying the British in Canada
- December 18–19 – War of 1812: British soldiers and native allies invade the United States and are successful in the Capture of Fort Niagara and attack Lewiston, New York.
- December 30 – War of 1812: British soldiers burn Buffalo, New York.

=== Undated ===
- The Philomathean Society of the University of Pennsylvania is founded (the oldest continuously existing literary society in the United States).

=== Ongoing ===
- War of 1812 (1812–1815)
- Gutiérrez-Magee Expedition (1812–1813)
- Creek War (1813–1814)

== Births ==
- January 21 – John C. Frémont, soldier, explorer and U.S. Senator from California from 1850 to 1851 (died 1890)
- February 11 – Harriet Ann Jacobs, African American memoirist and abolitionist (died 1897)
- February 15 – Frederick Holbrook, 27th Governor of Vermont from 1861 to 1863 (died 1909)
- February 16 – Joseph R. Anderson, civil engineer, industrialist and Confederate Army general (died 1892)
- February 23 – John Murray Forbes, railroad magnate, merchant, philanthropist and abolitionist (died 1898)
- March 8 – Christopher Pearse Cranch, writer and artist (died 1892)
- March 21 – James Strang, Mormon splinter group leader (died 1856)
- March 27 – Nathaniel Currier, illustrator (died 1888)
- April 9 – Lewis V. Bogy, U.S. Senator from Missouri from 1873 to 1877 (died 1877)
- April 23 – Stephen A. Douglas, U.S. Senator from Illinois from 1847 to 1861 and presidential candidate (died 1861)
- May 31 – Albert G. Brown, U.S. Senator from Mississippi from 1854 to 1861 (died 1880)
- June 8 – David Dixon Porter, admiral (died 1891)
- June 20 – Charles Timothy Brooks, translator, poet, Transcendentalist and Unitarian pastor (died 1883)
- June 24 – Henry Ward Beecher, clergyman and reformer (died 1887)
- July 15 – George Peter Alexander Healy, American portrait painter (died 1894)
- July 19 – Samuel M. Kier, industrialist (died 1874)
- August 28 – Jones Very, poet, essayist, Transcendentalist and clergyman (died 1880)
- August 29 – Henry Bergh, founder of the American Society for the Prevention of Cruelty to Animals (died 1888)
- September 1 – Mark Hopkins, Jr., entrepreneur (died 1878)
- September 17 – John Sedgwick, Union Army General (died 1864)
- September 27 – Epes Sargent, editor, poet and playwright (died 1880)
- October 12 – Lyman Trumbull, U.S. Senator from Illinois from 1855 to 1873 (died 1896)
- October 16 – Daniel D. Pratt, U.S. Senator from Indiana from 1869 to 1875 (died 1877)
- December 8 – August Belmont Sr., financier, diplomat, and chairman of Democratic National Committee (died 1890)
- December 10 – Zachariah Chandler, U.S. Senator from Michigan from 1857 to 1875 and in 1879 (died 1879)
- December 19 – Joseph P. Comegys, U.S. Senator from Delaware from 1856 to 1857 (died 1893)
- December 20 – Samuel J. Kirkwood, U.S. Senator from Iowa from 1881 to 1882 (died 1894)
- December 25 – Walker Brooke, U.S. Senator from Mississippi from 1852 to 1853 (died 1869)
- Date unknown – John Miley, Methodist theologian (died 1895)

== Deaths ==
- January 23 – George Clymer, signer of the Declaration of Independence (born 1739)
- February 3 – Samuel Ashe, 9th Governor of North Carolina from 1795 to 1798 (born 1725)
- February 6 – Augustus Magee, U.S. Army Lieutenant and Filibuster, died from a long-standing illness
- February 26 – Robert R. Livingston, lawyer, politician, diplomat from New York and a Founding Father of the United States (born 1746)
- April 19 – Benjamin Rush, signer of the Declaration of Independence, chemist, and physician (born 1746)
- April 27 – Zebulon Pike, General and explorer (born 1779)
- April 29 – John Andrews, clergyman, Provost of the University of Pennsylvania, "America's first scholar" (born 1746)
- August 9 – Abigail Amelia, first born daughter of John and Abigail Adams (born 1765)
- August 23 – Alexander Wilson, Scottish American ornithologist (born 1766)
- September 12 – Edmund Randolph, 2nd United States Secretary of State (born 1753)
- October 5 – Tecumseh, Shawnee leader (born 1768)
- October 22 – Charles Scott, army lieutenant, 4th Governor of Kentucky from 1808 to 1812 (born 1739)
- November 12 – John Hector St. John, French American writer (born 1735)
- November 17 – William Franklin, last colonial Governor of New Jersey from 1763 to 1776, son of Benjamin Franklin (born 1731)

== See also ==
- Timeline of United States history (1790–1819)
