= 1814 in the United States =

- Decades: 1790s; 1800s; 1810s; 1820s; 1830s
- See also: History of the United States (1789–1849); Timeline of United States history (1790–1819); List of years in the United States

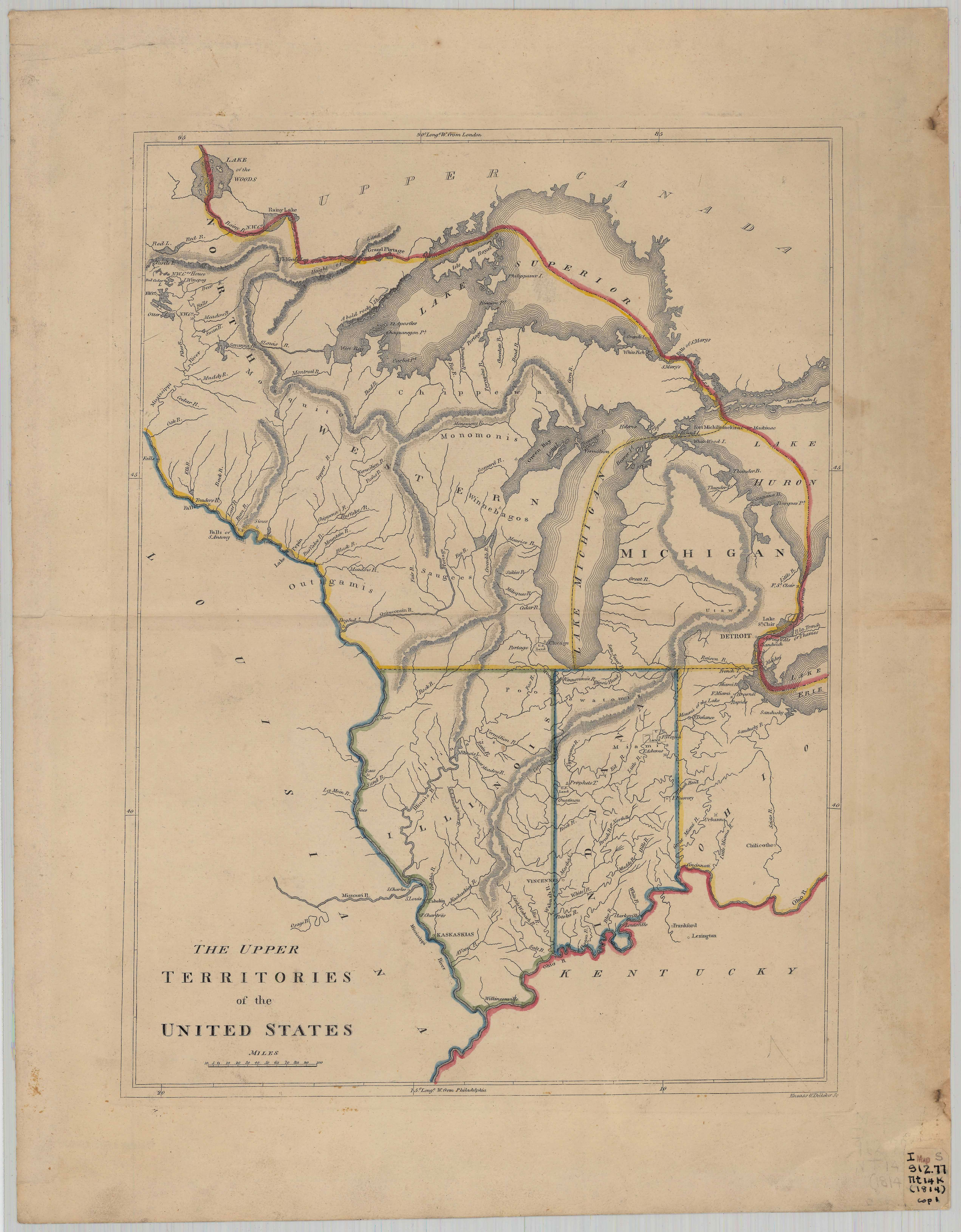
"The upper territories of the United States" (1814)

Events from the year 1814 in the United States.

== Incumbents ==
=== Federal government ===
- President: James Madison (DR-Virginia)
- Vice President:

Elbridge Gerry (DR-Massachusetts) (until November 23)
vacant (starting November 23)

- Chief Justice: John Marshall (Virginia)
- Speaker of the House of Representatives:

Henry Clay (DR-Kentucky) (until January 19)
Langdon Cheves (DR-South Carolina) (starting January 19)

- Congress: 13th

==== State governments ====
Governors and lieutenant governors

=== Governors ===
- Governor of Connecticut: John Cotton Smith (Federalist)
- Governor of Delaware: Joseph Haslet (Democratic-Republican) (until January 18), Daniel Rodney (Federalist) (starting January 18)
- Governor of Georgia: Peter Early (Democratic-Republican)
- Governor of Kentucky: Isaac Shelby (Democratic-Republican)
- Governor of Louisiana: William C. C. Claiborne (Democratic-Republican)
- Governor of Maryland: Levin Winder (Federalist)
- Governor of Massachusetts: Caleb Strong (Federalist)
- Governor of New Hampshire: John Taylor Gilman (Federalist)
- Governor of New Jersey: William Sanford Pennington (Democratic-Republican)
- Governor of New York: Daniel D. Tompkins (Democratic-Republican)
- Governor of North Carolina: William Hawkins (Democratic-Republican) (until November 29), William Miller (Democratic-Republican) (starting November 29)
- Governor of Ohio:
  - until March 24:Return J. Meigs, Jr. (Democratic-Republican)
  - March 24-December 8: Othniel Looker (Democratic-Republican)
  - starting December 8: Thomas Worthington (Democratic-Republican)
- Governor of Pennsylvania: Simon Snyder (Democratic-Republican)
- Governor of Rhode Island: William Jones (Federalist)
- Governor of South Carolina: Joseph Alston (Democratic-Republican) (until December 10), David Rogerson Williams (Democratic-Republican) (starting December 10)
- Governor of Tennessee: Willie Blount (Democratic-Republican)
- Governor of Vermont: Martin Chittenden (Federalist)
- Governor of Virginia: James Barbour (Democratic-Republican) (until December 1), Wilson Cary Nicholas (Democratic-Republican) (starting December 1)

=== Lieutenant governors ===
- Lieutenant Governor of Connecticut: Chauncey Goodrich (Federalist)
- Lieutenant Governor of Kentucky: Richard Hickman (political party unknown)
- Lieutenant Governor of Massachusetts: William Phillips, Jr. (political party unknown)
- Lieutenant Governor of New York: DeWitt Clinton (Democratic-Republican)
- Lieutenant Governor of Rhode Island: Simeon Martin (political party unknown)
- Lieutenant Governor of South Carolina: Eldred Simkins (Democratic-Republican) (until December 10), Robert Creswell (Democratic-Republican) (starting December 10)
- Lieutenant Governor of Vermont: William Chamberlain (Federalist)

== Events ==
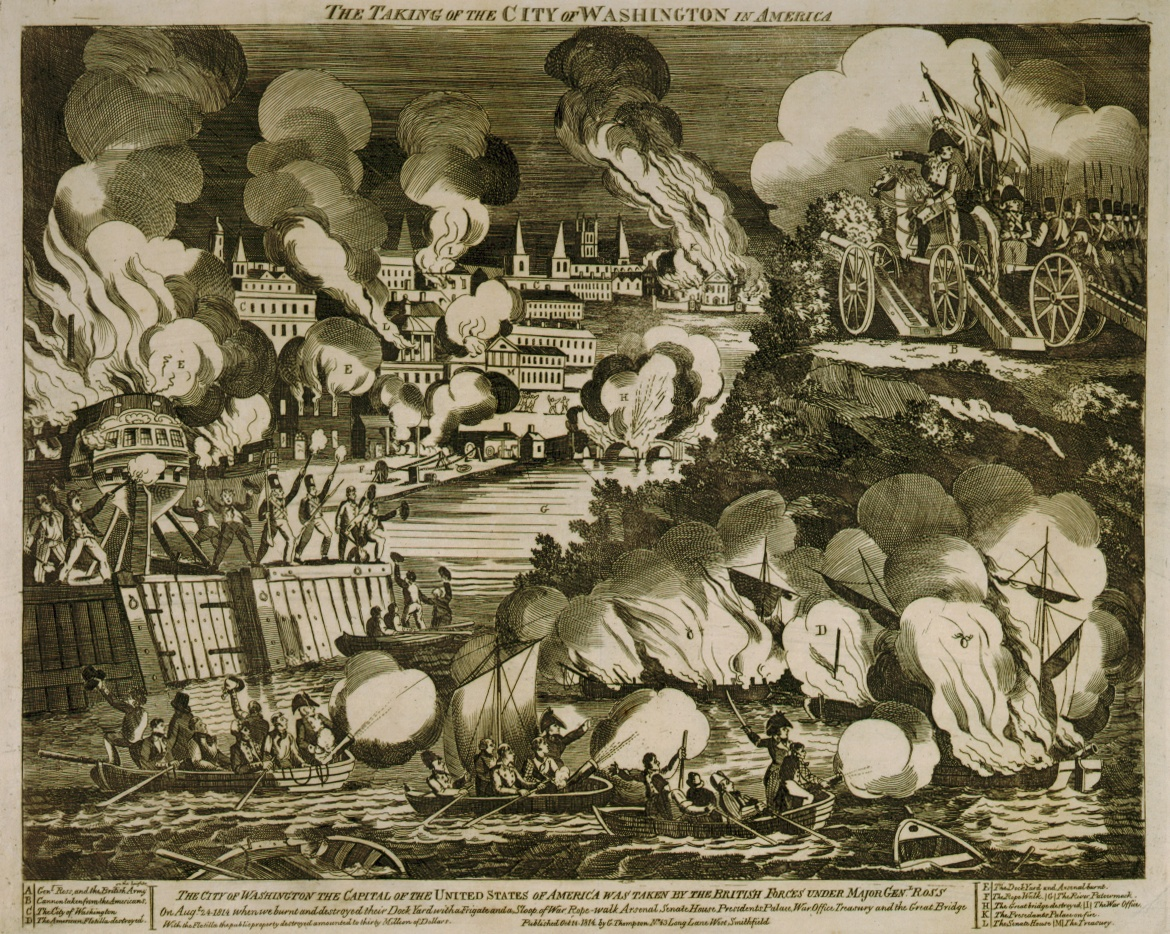
August 24: British troops burn Washington, D.C.

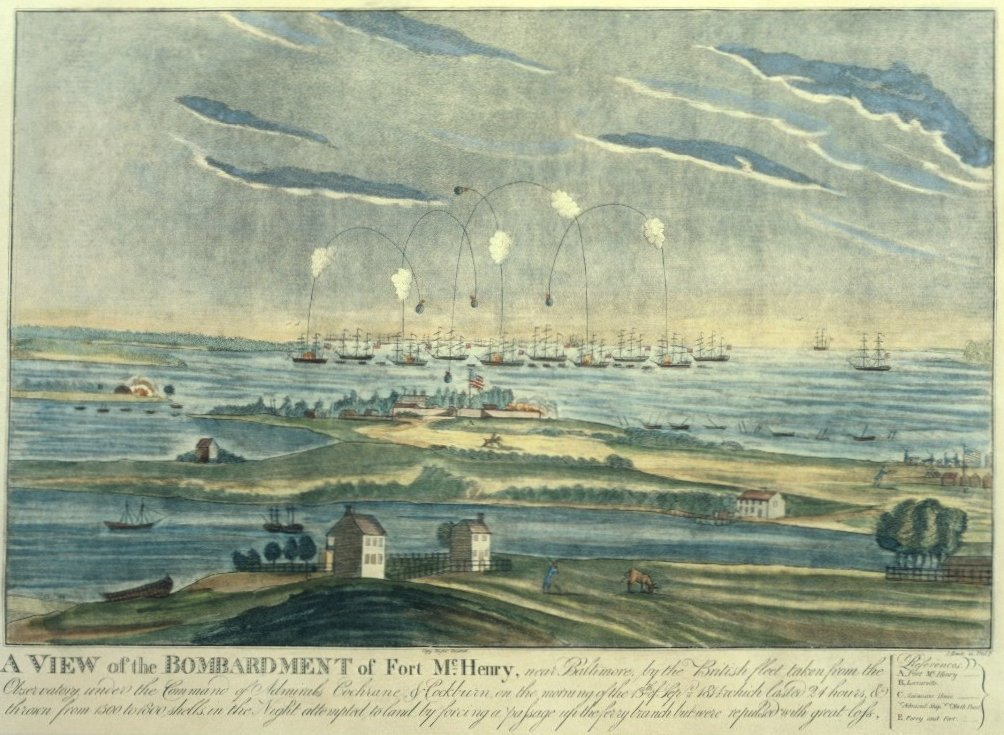
September 13: Battle of Baltimore

December 24: Treaty of Ghent ends the War of 1812

=== January–June ===
- January 22–24 – Creek War – Andrew Jackson fights the Red Sticks at the battles of Emuckfaw and Enotachopo Creek.
- January 27 – Creek War – Battle of Callabee Creek: Red Sticks unsuccessfully attack Georgia volunteers in present-day Macon County, Alabama.
- March 9 – The USS Enterprise reaches Wilmington, North Carolina, returning from the Caribbean.
- March 27 – Creek War – Battle of Horseshoe Bend: In northern Alabama, United States forces under General Andrew Jackson defeat the Creek Indians.
- May 5 – War of 1812 – The British attack Fort Ontario at Oswego, New York.

=== July–December ===
- July 5 – War of 1812 – Battle of Chippawa: American Major General Jacob Brown defeats British General Phineas Riall at Chippawa, Ontario.
- July 24 – War of 1812 – General Phineas Riall advances toward Niagara Falls, Ontario to halt Jacob Brown's American invaders.
- July 25 – War of 1812 – Battle of Lundy's Lane: Reinforcements arrive near Niagara Falls, Ontario for General Phineas Riall's British and Canadian force, and a bloody, all-night battle with Jacob Brown's Americans commences at 1800 hours; Americans retreat to Fort Erie.
- July 26–August 4 – War of 1812 – Americans fail to recapture Fort Mackinac at the Battle of Mackinac Island.
- August 24 – War of 1812 – Battle of Bladensburg: British forces defeat the Americans at Bladensburg, Maryland, allowing the British to enter Washington, D.C.
- August 24 – War of 1812 – Burning of Washington – British troops, after defeating American forces, at the Battle of Bladensburg, occupy Washington, D.C., setting numerous buildings on fire, including the Capitol and Presidential Mansion.
- August 28 – War of 1812 – Alexandria, Virginia offers surrender to the British fleet without a fight.
- September 11 – War of 1812 – Battle of Lake Champlain: An American squadron under Thomas Macdonough defeats the British squadron, ultimately forcing the invading army to retreat back into Canada.
- September 13 – War of 1812 – The British bombard Fort McHenry at Baltimore. The British failure at the Battle of Baltimore is a turning point in the war, and the American defense of the fort inspires Francis Scott Key to compose the poem later set to music as "The Star-Spangled Banner".
- September 21 – War of 1812 – British forces abandon the Siege of Fort Erie.
- November 7 – War of 1812 – Andrew Jackson seizes Pensacola, Florida.
- November 23 – Vice President Elbridge Gerry dies from heart failure. The office remains vacant through the remainder of James Madison's presidency.
- December 15 – The Hartford Convention is convened by members of the American Federalist Party.
- December 24 – War of 1812 – The Treaty of Ghent is signed, officially ending the war. The treaty is later ratified by the Americans on February 16, 1815.

=== Undated ===
- Completion of the Boston Manufacturing Company's integrated cotton weaving mill on the Charles River at Waltham, Massachusetts, engineered by Paul Moody for Francis Cabot Lowell and 'The Boston Associates', and inaugurating the Waltham-Lowell system of manufacturing.
- "The world's first complex machine mass-produced from interchangeable parts", Eli Terry's wooden pillar-and-scroll clock, comes off the production line in Plymouth, Connecticut.
- The Harmony Society establishes Harmony, Indiana Territory.

=== Ongoing ===
- War of 1812 (1812–1815)
- Creek War (1813–1814)

== Births ==
- January 1 – William Bigler, United States Senator from Pennsylvania from 1856 till 1861. (died 1880)
- February 9 – Samuel J. Tilden, 25th Governor of New York from 1875 till 1876 and 1876 Democratic presidential candidate (died 1886)
- February 22 – Henry P. Baldwin, 15th Governor of Michigan from 1869 till 1873 and United States Senator from Michigan from 1879 till 1881. (died 1892)
- April 3 – Lorenzo Snow, 5th president of the Church of Jesus Christ of Latter-day Saints (died 1901)
- April 29 – Homer V.M. Miller, United States Senator in Georgia from 1871. (died 1896)
- June 11 – Henry Whitney Bellows, clergyman of the Unitarian Church (died 1882)
- June 22 – James H. Lane United States Senator from Kansas from 1861 till 1866. (died 1866)
- July 19 – Samuel Colt, inventor (died 1862)
- July 22 – Robert Ward Johnson, United States Senator from Arkansas from 1862 till 1865. (died 1879)
- August 5 – James Dixon, United States Senator from Connecticut from 1857 till 1869. (died 1873)
- October 2 – John Elliott Ward, politician and diplomat (died 1902)
- November 13 – Joseph Hooker, general in the Union Army during American Civil War (died 1879)
- December 19 – Edwin Stanton, 27th United States Secretary of War (died 1869)
- December 28 – Jeremiah Clemens, United States Senator from Alabama from 1849 till 1853. (died 1865)

== Deaths ==
- January 7 – Ira Allen, one of the founders of Vermont and brother of Ethan Allen (born 1751)
- March 13 – Angelica Schuyler Church, eldest child of Philip Schuyler (born 1756)
- April 15 – Lewis Robards, first husband of Rachel Jackson (born 1758)
- May 12 - Robert Treat Paine, founding father of the United States (born 1731)
- October 19 – Mercy Otis Warren, historian and poet (born 1728)
- November 23 – Elbridge Gerry, fifth vice president of the United States from 1813 to 1814 (born 1744)

== See also ==
- 1814 in Canada
- 1814 in the United Kingdom
- Timeline of United States history (1790–1819)
