= 1877 in the United States =

- Decades: 1850s; 1860s; 1870s; 1880s; 1890s
- See also: History of the United States (1865–1918); Timeline of United States history (1860–1899); List of years in the United States

Events from the year 1877 in the United States.

== Incumbents ==
=== Federal government ===
- President:

Ulysses S. Grant (R-Ohio) (until March 4)
Rutherford B. Hayes (R-Ohio) (starting March 4)

- Vice President:

vacant (until March 4)
William A. Wheeler (R-New York) (starting March 4)

- Chief Justice: Morrison Waite (Ohio)
- Speaker of the House of Representatives: Samuel J. Randall (D-Pennsylvania)
- Congress: 44th (until March 4), 45th (starting March 4)

==== State governments ====
Governors and lieutenant governors

=== Governors ===
- Governor of Alabama: George S. Houston (Democratic)
- Governor of Arkansas: Augustus Hill Garland (Democratic) (until January 11), William Read Miller (Democratic) (starting January 11)
- Governor of California: William Irwin (Democratic)
- Governor of Colorado: John Long Routt (Republican)
- Governor of Connecticut: Charles R. Ingersoll (Democratic) (until January 3), Richard D. Hubbard (Democratic) (starting January 3)
- Governor of Delaware: John P. Cochran (Democratic)
- Governor of Florida: Marcellus Stearns (Republican) (until January 2), George Franklin Drew (Democratic) (starting January 2)
- Governor of Georgia: James Milton Smith (Democratic) (until January 12), Alfred H. Colquitt (Democratic) (starting January 12)
- Governor of Illinois: John Lourie Beveridge (Republican) (until January 8), Shelby Moore Cullom (Republican) (starting January 8)
- Governor of Indiana: Thomas A. Hendricks (Democratic) (until January 8), James D. Williams (Democratic) (starting January 8)
- Governor of Iowa: Samuel J. Kirkwood (Republican) (until February 1), Joshua G. Newbold (Republican) (starting February 1)
- Governor of Kansas: Thomas A. Osborn (Republican) (until January 8), George T. Anthony (Republican) (starting January 8)
- Governor of Kentucky: James B. McCreary (Democratic)
- Governor of Louisiana:
  - until January 8: William Pitt Kellogg (Republican)
  - January 8-April 24: Stephen B. Packard (Republican)
  - starting April 24: Francis T. Nicholls (Democratic)
- Governor of Maine: Seldon Connor (Republican)
- Governor of Maryland: John Lee Carroll (Democratic)
- Governor of Massachusetts: Alexander H. Rice (Republican)
- Governor of Michigan: John J. Bagley (Republican) (until January 3), Charles Croswell (Republican) (starting January 3)
- Governor of Minnesota: John S. Pillsbury (Republican)
- Governor of Mississippi: John M. Stone (Democratic)
- Governor of Missouri: Charles Henry Hardin (Democratic) (until January 8), John Smith Phelps (Democratic) (starting January 8)
- Governor of Nebraska: Silas Garber (Republican)
- Governor of Nevada: Lewis R. Bradley (Democratic)
- Governor of New Hampshire: Person C. Cheney (Republican) (until June 7), Benjamin F. Prescott (Republican) (starting June 7)
- Governor of New Jersey: Joseph D. Bedle (Democratic)
- Governor of New York: Lucius Robinson (Democratic) (starting January 1)
- Governor of North Carolina: Curtis Hooks Brogden (Republican) (until January 1), Zebulon Baird Vance (Democratic) (starting January 1)
- Governor of Ohio: Rutherford B. Hayes (Republican) (until March 2), Thomas L. Young (Republican) (starting March 2)
- Governor of Oregon: La Fayette Grover (Democratic) (until February 1), Stephen F. Chadwick (Democratic) (starting February 1)
- Governor of Pennsylvania: John F. Hartranft (Republican)
- Governor of Rhode Island: Henry Lippitt (Republican) (until May 29), Charles C. Van Zandt (Republican) (starting May 29)
- Governor of South Carolina: Wade Hampton III (Democratic)
- Governor of Tennessee: James D. Porter (Democratic)
- Governor of Texas: Richard B. Hubbard (Democratic)
- Governor of Vermont: Horace Fairbanks (Republican)
- Governor of Virginia: James L. Kemper (Democratic)
- Governor of West Virginia: John J. Jacob (Democratic)/(Independent) (until March 4), Henry M. Mathews (Democratic) (starting March 4)
- Governor of Wisconsin: Harrison Ludington (Republican)

=== Lieutenant governors ===
- Lieutenant Governor of California: James A. Johnson (Democratic)
- Lieutenant Governor of Colorado: Lafayette Head (Republican)
- Lieutenant Governor of Connecticut: George G. Sill (Republican) (starting January 3), Francis Loomis (Democratic) (starting January 3)
- Lieutenant Governor of Florida: vacant (until month and day unknown), Noble A. Hull (Democratic) (starting month and day unknown)
- Lieutenant Governor of Illinois: Archibald A. Glenn (Democratic) (until January 8), Andrew Shuman (Republican) (starting January 8)
- Lieutenant Governor of Indiana: Leonidas Sexton (Republican) (until January 13), Isaac P. Gray (Democratic) (starting January 13)
- Lieutenant Governor of Iowa: Joshua G. Newbold (Republican (until February 1), vacant (starting February 1)
- Lieutenant Governor of Kansas: Melville J. Salter (Republican) (until January 8), Lyman U. Humphrey (Republican) (starting January 8)
- Lieutenant Governor of Kentucky: John C. Underwood (Democratic)
- Lieutenant Governor of Louisiana: Caesar Antoine (Republican) (until April 24), Louis A. Wiltz (Democratic) (starting April 24)
- Lieutenant Governor of Massachusetts: Horatio G. Knight (Republican)
- Lieutenant Governor of Michigan: Henry H. Holt (Republican) (until month and day unknown), Alonzo Sessions (Republican) (starting month and day unknown)
- Lieutenant Governor of Minnesota: James Wakefield (Republican)
- Lieutenant Governor of Mississippi: John M. Stone (Democratic)
- Lieutenant Governor of Missouri: Norman Jay Coleman (Democratic) (until January 8), Henry Clay Brockmeyer (Democratic) (starting January 8)
- Lieutenant Governor of Nebraska: Othman A. Abbott (Republican) (starting month and day unknown)
- Lieutenant Governor of Nevada: Jewett W. Adams (Democratic)
- Lieutenant Governor of New York: William Dorsheimer (Democratic)
- Lieutenant Governor of North Carolina: vacant (until January 1), Thomas J. Jarvis (Democratic) (starting January 1)
- Lieutenant Governor of Ohio: Thomas Lowry Young (Republican) (until March 2), H. W. Curtiss (Republican) (starting March 2)
- Lieutenant Governor of Pennsylvania: John Latta (Democratic)
- Lieutenant Governor of Rhode Island: Henry Tillinghast Sisson (political party unknown) (until month and day unknown), Albert Howard (Republican) (starting month and day unknown)
- Lieutenant Governor of South Carolina: William Dunlap Simpson (Democratic)
- Lieutenant Governor of Tennessee: Thomas H. Paine (Democratic) (until month and day unknown), Hugh M. McAdoo (Democratic) (starting month and day unknown)
- Lieutenant Governor of Texas: vacant
- Lieutenant Governor of Vermont: Redfield Proctor (Republican)
- Lieutenant Governor of Virginia: Henry Wirtz Thomas (Republican)
- Lieutenant Governor of Wisconsin: Charles D. Parker (Democratic)

== Events ==
=== January–March ===
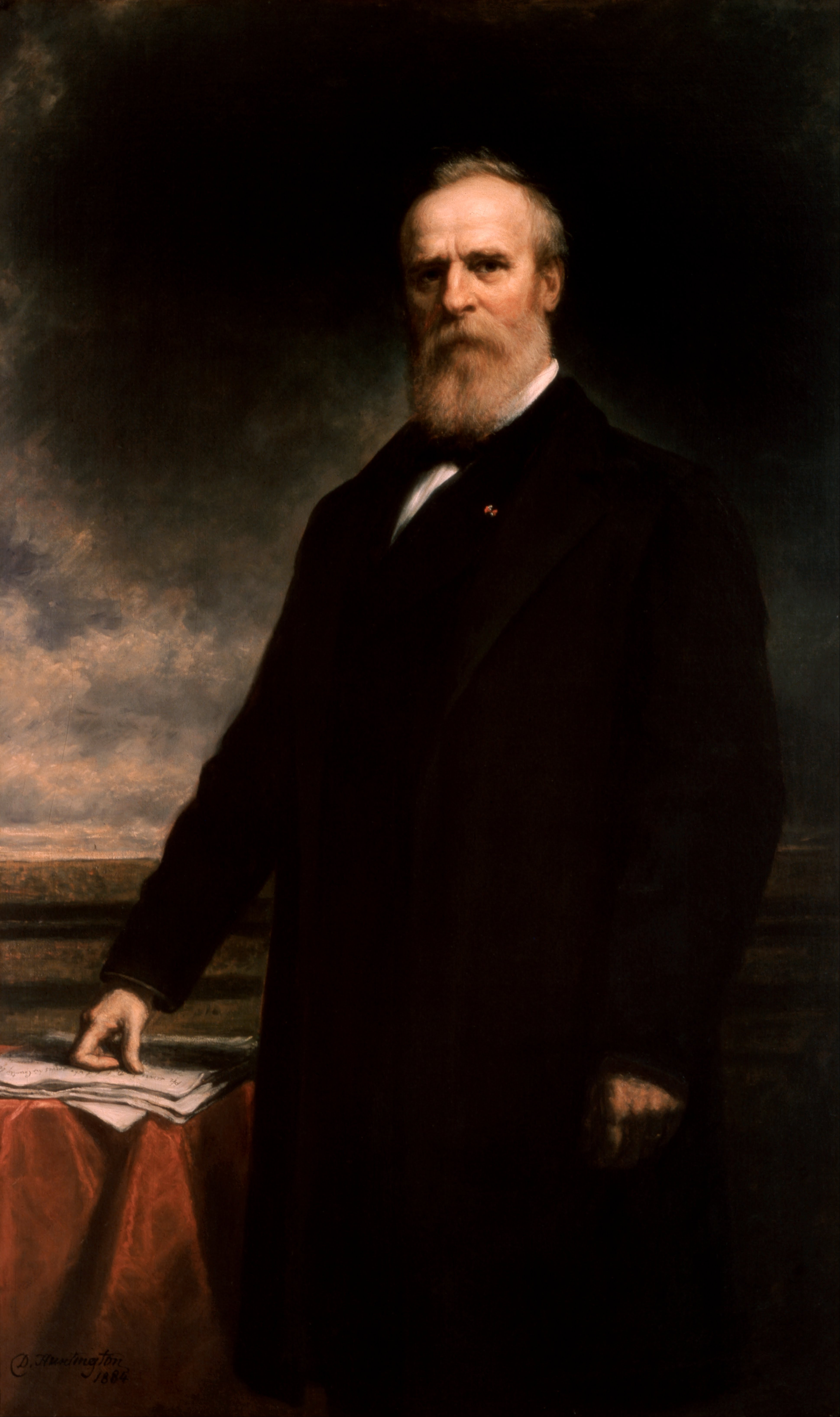
March 4: Rutherford B. Hayes becomes the 19th U.S. president

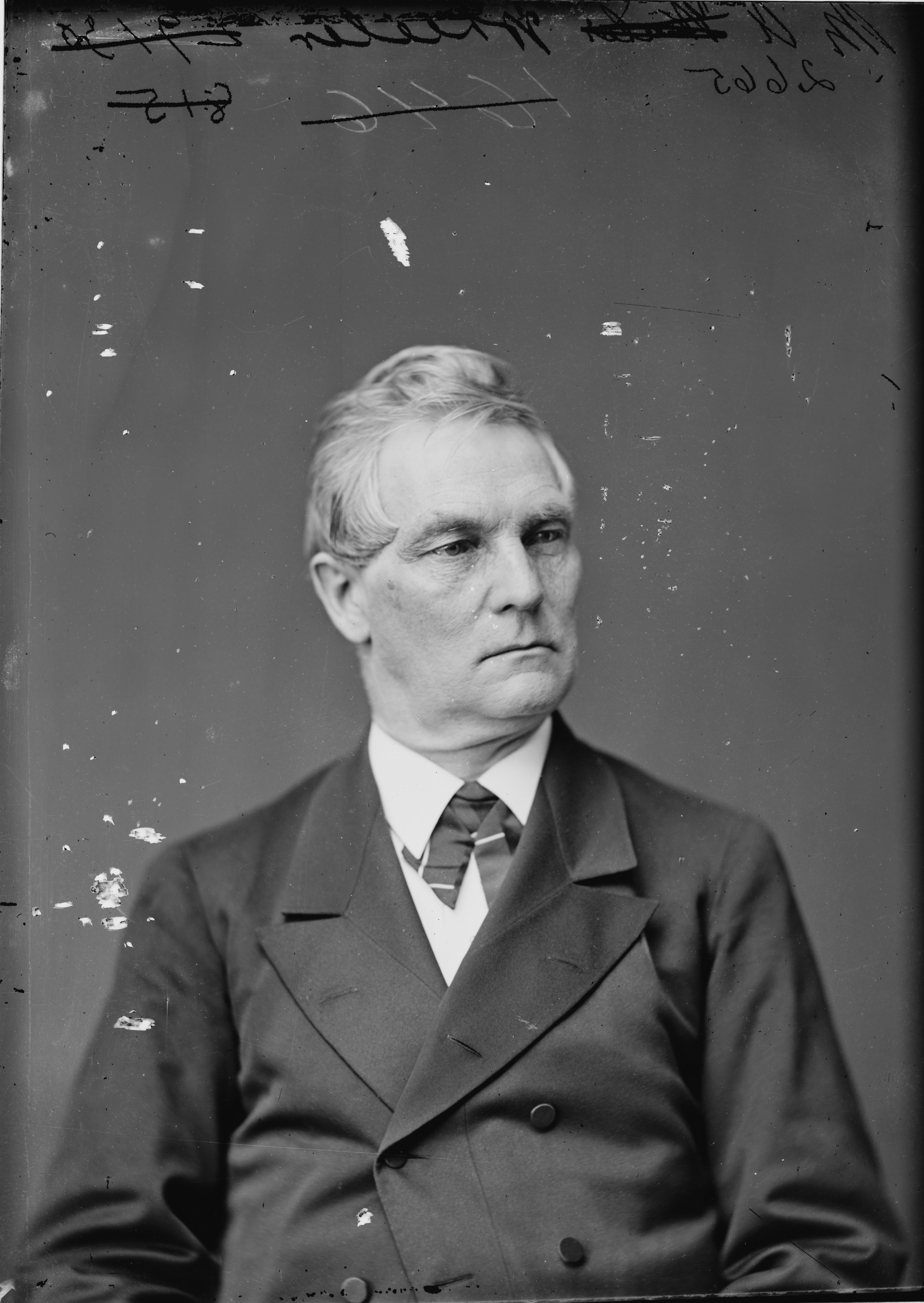
William A. Wheeler becomes the 19th U.S. vice president

- January 8 – Indian Wars – Battle of Wolf Mountain: Crazy Horse and his warriors fight their last battle with the United States Cavalry in Montana.
- February 28 – Indian Wars – Agreement of 1877 (19 Stat. 254): Congress annexes Sioux Indian land, including the Black Hills.
- March 2 – In the Compromise of 1877, the U.S. presidential election, 1876 is resolved with the selection of Rutherford B. Hayes as the winner, even though Samuel J. Tilden had won the popular vote on November 7, 1876.
- March 4
  - Rutherford B. Hayes was sworn in as the 19th president of the United States, and William A. Wheeler sworn in as the 19th vice president of the United States.
  - Romualdo Pacheco of California takes office as the first Latino to serve in the United States Congress.
- March 13 – Chester Greenwood of Farmington, Maine, patents earmuffs.

=== April–June ===
- April 15 – First telephone line installed between Boston and Somerville, Massachusetts.
- May 5 – Indian Wars: Sitting Bull leads his band of Lakota into Canada to avoid harassment by the United States Army under Colonel Nelson Miles.
- May 6 – Realizing that his people are weakened by cold and hunger, Chief Crazy Horse of the Oglala Sioux surrenders to United States troops in Nebraska.
- May 8 – At Gilmore's Gardens in New York City, the first Westminster Kennel Club Dog Show opens (ends May 11).
- June 15 – Henry Ossian Flipper becomes the first African American cadet to graduate from the United States Military Academy.
- June 17 – Indian Wars – Battle of White Bird Canyon: The Nez Perce defeat the U.S. Cavalry at White Bird Canyon in the Idaho Territory.
- June 21 – The Molly Maguires are hanged at Carbon County Prison in Jim Thorpe, Pennsylvania.

=== July–September ===
- July 10 – The then villa of Mayagüez, Puerto Rico formally receives its city charter from the Royal Crown of Spain.
- July 16 – Great Railroad Strike of 1877: Riots by Baltimore and Ohio Railroad railroad workers in Baltimore, Maryland, lead to a sympathy strike in Pittsburgh, and a worker's rebellion in St. Louis before U.S. president Rutherford B. Hayes calls in the armed forces.
- August 9 – Indian Wars – Battle of Big Hole: Near Big Hole River in Montana, a small band of Nez Percé Indians who refused government orders to move to a reservation, clash with the United States Army. The army loses 29 soldiers and Indians lose 89 warriors in a U.S. Army victory.
- August 17 – Arizona blacksmith F.P. Cahill is fatally wounded by Billy the Kid. Cahill dies the next day, becoming the first person killed by the Kid.
- September – The first meeting of the Knights of Reliance in Lampasas County, Texas, which morphed into the Farmers' Alliance and eventually became the Populist Party.
- September 5 – Indian Wars: Oglala Sioux chief Crazy Horse is bayoneted by a United States soldier, after resisting confinement in a guardhouse at Fort Robinson in Nebraska.

=== October–December ===
- October 10 – Following the recovery of Lieutenant-Colonel George Armstrong Custer's body from where he fell during the Battle of Little Big Horn the previous year, Custer is given a funeral with full military honors and is laid to rest at the United States Military Academy at West Point, New York.
- November 21 – Thomas Edison announces his invention of the phonograph, a machine that can record sound, considered Edison's first great invention. Edison demonstrates the device for the first time on December 6.
- November 22 – The first college lacrosse game is played between New York University and Manhattan College.
- December 6 – The Washington Post newspaper first published in D.C.

=== Ongoing ===
- Reconstruction era (1865–1877)
- Gilded Age (1869–c. 1896)
- Depression of 1873–79 (1873–1879)

== Sport ==
- September 29 – Boston Red Caps win their First National League Championship

== Births ==
- March 7 – Charles O. Andrews, U.S. senator from Florida from 1936 to 1946 (died 1946)
- March 9 – Albert Leo Stevens, balloonist (died 1944)
- March 16 – Thomas Wyatt Turner, civil rights activist, biologist and educator; first black person ever to receive a doctorate from Cornell (died 1978)
- April 3 – Karl C. Schuyler, U.S. senator from Colorado from 1932 to 1933 (died 1933)
- April 23 – Charles D. Herron, United States Army general (died 1977)
- May 16 – Joseph M. McCormick, U.S. senator from Illinois from 1919 to 1925 (died 1925)
- May 23 – Grace Ingalls, youngest sister of author Laura Ingalls Wilder (died 1941)
- May 26 (probable date) – Isadora Duncan, dancer (died 1927 in France)
- June 12 – Thomas C. Hart, U.S. senator from Connecticut from 1945 to 1946 (died 1971)
- July 1 – Benjamin O. Davis Sr., US Army General. First African-American to rise to the rank of brigadier general. (died 1970)
- July 2 – Rinaldo Cuneo, artist, "the painter of San Francisco" (died 1939)
- August 10 – Frank Marshall, chess player (died 1944)
- August 15 – Stanley Vestal, historian of the Old West and poet (died 1957)
- August 27 – Lloyd C. Douglas, novelist and pastor (died 1951)
- September 6 – Buddy Bolden, African American jazz cornetist (died 1930)
- October 2 – Carl Hayden, U.S. senator from Arizona from 1927 to 1969 (died 1972)
- October 13 – Theodore G. Bilbo, Governor of Mississippi from 1928 to 1932 and from 1935 to 1947 and U.S. senator from Mississippi from 1935 to 1947 (died 1947)
- October 31 – Josiah O. Wolcott, U.S. senator from Delaware from 1917 to 1921 (died 1938)
- November 12 – Warren Austin, U.S. senator from Vermont from 1931 to 1946 (died 1962)
- November 16 – Rice W. Means, U.S. senator from Colorado from 1924 to 1927 (died 1949)
- November 24
  - Alben W. Barkley, 35th vice president of the United States from 1949 to 1953 and U.S. senator from Kentucky from 1927 to 1949 and from 1955 to 1956 (died 1956)
  - Edward C. Kalbfus, admiral (died 1954)

== Deaths ==
- January 3 – John Joseph Abercrombie, Union Army brigadier general (born 1798)
- January 4 – Cornelius Vanderbilt, entrepreneur (born 1794)
- January 17 – John Pettit, U.S. senator from Indiana from 1853 to 1855 (born 1807)
- June 17 – Daniel D. Pratt, U.S. senator from Indiana from 1869 to 1875 (born 1813)
- July 16 – Samuel McLean, congressman from Montana (born 1826)
- August 28 – Ben DeBar, American actor-manager (born 1812)
- August 29 – Brigham Young, Mormon leader (born 1801)
- August 30 – Raphael Semmes, officer in the Confederate navy during the American Civil War (born 1809)
- September 5 – Crazy Horse, Oglala Lakota chief (born 1840-45)
- September 20 – Lewis V. Bogy, U.S. senator from Missouri from 1873 to 1877 (born 1813)
- October 29 – Nathan Bedford Forrest, Confederate Civil War General, first Grand Wizard of the Ku Klux Klan (born 1821)
- November 1 – Oliver P. Morton, U.S. senator from Indiana from 1867 to 1877 (born 1823)

== See also ==
- Timeline of United States history (1860–1899)
