= 1879 in the United States =

- Decades: 1850s; 1860s; 1870s; 1880s; 1890s
- See also: History of the United States (1865–1918); Timeline of United States history (1860–1899); List of years in the United States

Events from the year 1879 in the United States.

== Incumbents ==
=== Federal government ===
- President: Rutherford B. Hayes (R-Ohio)
- Vice President: William A. Wheeler (R-New York)
- Chief Justice: Morrison Waite (Ohio)
- Speaker of the House of Representatives: Samuel J. Randall (D-Pennsylvania)
- Congress: 45th (until March 4), 46th (starting March 4)

==== State governments ====
Governors and lieutenant governors

=== Governors ===
- Governor of Alabama: Rufus W. Cobb (Democratic)
- Governor of Arkansas: William Read Miller (Democratic)
- Governor of California: William Irwin (Democratic)
- Governor of Colorado: John Long Routt (Republican) (until January 14), Frederick Walker Pitkin (Republican) (starting January 14)
- Governor of Connecticut: Richard D. Hubbard (Democratic) (until January 9), Charles B. Andrews (Republican) (starting January 9)
- Governor of Delaware: John P. Cochran (Democratic) (until January 21), John W. Hall (Democratic) (starting January 21)
- Governor of Florida: George Franklin Drew (Democratic)
- Governor of Georgia: Alfred H. Colquitt (Democratic)
- Governor of Illinois: Shelby Moore Cullom (Republican)
- Governor of Indiana: James D. Williams (Democratic)
- Governor of Iowa: John H. Gear (Republican)
- Governor of Kansas: George T. Anthony (Republican) (until January 13), John P. St. John (Republican) (starting January 13)
- Governor of Kentucky: James B. McCreary (Democratic) (until September 2), Luke P. Blackburn (Democratic) (starting September 2)
- Governor of Louisiana: Francis T. Nicholls (Democratic)
- Governor of Maine: Seldon Connor (Republican) (until January 8), Alonzo Garcelon (Democratic) (starting January 8)
- Governor of Maryland: John Lee Carroll (Democratic)
- Governor of Massachusetts: Alexander H. Rice (Republican) (until January 2), Thomas Talbot (Republican) (starting January 2)
- Governor of Michigan: Charles Croswell (Republican)
- Governor of Minnesota: John S. Pillsbury (Republican)
- Governor of Mississippi: John M. Stone (Democratic)
- Governor of Missouri: John Smith Phelps (Democratic)
- Governor of Nebraska: Silas Garber (Republican) (until January 9), Albinus Nance (Republican) (starting January 9)
- Governor of Nevada: Lewis R. Bradley (Democratic) (until January 6), John H. Kinkead (Republican) (starting January 6)
- Governor of New Hampshire: Benjamin F. Prescott (Republican) (until June 5), Natt Head (Republican) (starting June 5)
- Governor of New Jersey: George B. McClellan (Democratic)
- Governor of New York: Lucius Robinson (Democratic) (until end of December 31)
- Governor of North Carolina: Zebulon Baird Vance (Democratic) (until February 5), Thomas Jordan Jarvis (Democratic) (starting February 5)
- Governor of Ohio: Richard M. Bishop (Democratic)
- Governor of Oregon: W. W. Thayer (Democratic)
- Governor of Pennsylvania: John F. Hartranft (Republican) (until January 21), Henry M. Hoyt (Republican) (starting January 21)
- Governor of Rhode Island: Charles C. Van Zandt (Republican)
- Governor of South Carolina: Wade Hampton III (Democratic) (until February 26), William Dunlap Simpson (Democratic) (starting February 26)
- Governor of Tennessee: James D. Porter (Democratic) (until February 16), Albert S. Marks (Democratic) (starting February 16)
- Governor of Texas: Richard B. Hubbard (Democratic) (until January 21), Oran M. Roberts (Democratic) (starting January 21)
- Governor of Vermont: Redfield Proctor (Republican)
- Governor of Virginia: Frederick W. M. Holliday (Democratic)
- Governor of West Virginia: Henry M. Mathews (Democratic)
- Governor of Wisconsin: William E. Smith (Republican)

=== Lieutenant governors ===
- Lieutenant Governor of California: James A. Johnson (Democratic)
- Lieutenant Governor of Colorado: Lafayette Head (Republican) (until January 14), Horace Austin Warner Tabor (Republican) (starting January 14)
- Lieutenant Governor of Connecticut: Francis Loomis (Democratic) (until January 9), David Gallup (Republican) (starting January 9)
- Lieutenant Governor of Florida: Noble A. Hull (Democratic) (until month and day unknown), vacant (starting month and day unknown)
- Lieutenant Governor of Illinois: Andrew Shuman (Republican)
- Lieutenant Governor of Indiana: Isaac P. Gray (Democratic)
- Lieutenant Governor of Iowa: Frank T. Campbell (Republican)
- Lieutenant Governor of Kansas: Lyman U. Humphrey (Republican)
- Lieutenant Governor of Kentucky: John C. Underwood (Democratic) (until September 2), James E. Cantrill (Democratic) (starting September 2)
- Lieutenant Governor of Louisiana: Louis A. Wiltz (Democratic)
- Lieutenant Governor of Massachusetts: Horatio G. Knight (Republican) (until January 2), John D. Long (Republican) (starting January 2)
- Lieutenant Governor of Michigan: Alonzo Sessions (Republican)
- Lieutenant Governor of Minnesota: James Wakefield (Republican)
- Lieutenant Governor of Mississippi: William H. Sims (Democratic)
- Lieutenant Governor of Missouri: Henry Clay Brockmeyer (Democratic)
- Lieutenant Governor of Nebraska: Othman A. Abbott (Republican) (until January 9), Edmund C. Carns (Republican) (starting January 9)
- Lieutenant Governor of Nevada: Jewett W. Adams (Democratic)
- Lieutenant Governor of New York: William Dorsheimer (Democratic) (until end of December 31)
- Lieutenant Governor of North Carolina: Thomas J. Jarvis (Democratic) (until February 5), vacant (starting February 5)
- Lieutenant Governor of Ohio: Jabez W. Fitch (Democratic)
- Lieutenant Governor of Pennsylvania: John Latta (Democratic) (until January 21), Charles Warren Stone (Republican) (starting January 21)
- Lieutenant Governor of Rhode Island: Albert Howard (Republican)
- Lieutenant Governor of South Carolina: William Dunlap Simpson (Democratic) (until February 26), vacant (starting February 26)
- Lieutenant Governor of Tennessee: Hugh M. McAdoo (Democratic) (until month and day unknown), John R. Neal (Democratic) (starting month and day unknown)
- Lieutenant Governor of Texas: vacant (until January 21), Joseph Draper Sayers (Democratic) (starting January 21)
- Lieutenant Governor of Vermont: Eben Pomeroy Colton (Republican)
- Lieutenant Governor of Virginia: James A. Walker (Democratic)
- Lieutenant Governor of Wisconsin: James M. Bingham (Republican)

== Events ==
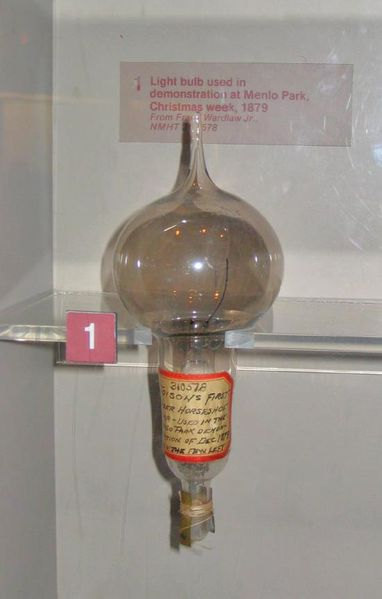
December 31: Edison demonstrates his light bulb.

- January – The constitution of California is ratified.
- January 1 – The Specie Resumption Act takes effect: the Greenback is valued the same as gold for the first time since the American Civil War.
- February 12 – At New York City's Madison Square Garden, the first artificial ice rink in North America opens.
- February 15 – Women's rights: President Rutherford B. Hayes signs a bill allowing female attorneys to argue cases before the Supreme Court of the United States.
- February 22 – In Utica, New York, Frank Woolworth opens the first of many of 5 and 10-cent Woolworth stores.
- March 3 – The United States Geological Survey is created.
- April 8 – Milk sold in glass bottles for the first time.
- April 12 – Mary Baker Eddy founds the Church of Christ, Scientist in Boston.
- May 10
  - The Archaeological Institute of America (AIA) is formed.
  - Meteorite falls near Estherville, Iowa.
- May 30 – New York City's Gilmore's Garden is renamed Madison Square Garden after President James Madison by William Henry Vanderbilt, and is opened to the public at 26th Street and Madison Avenue.
- June 21 – Infielder William White plays in one game for the Providence Grays and in conjecture becomes the first African American to play MLB.
- July 1 – Restorationist Charles Taze Russell publishes the first issue of the monthly Zion's Watch Tower and Herald of Christ's Presence which, as The Watchtower, will become the most widely circulated magazine in the world.
- July 8 – The ill-fated U.S. Jeannette Expedition departs San Francisco in an attempt to reach the North Pole by pioneering a route through the Bering Strait.
- July 19 – Doc Holliday kills for the first time after a man shoots up Holliday's New Mexico saloon.
- September – Henry George self-publishes his major work Progress and Poverty.
- September 25 – Deadwood, South Dakota fire: 2000 people are left homeless and 300 buildings destroyed; total loss of property is estimated at $3 million.
- September 29 – Meeker Massacre: Nathan Meeker and others are killed in an uprising at the White River Ute Indian Reservation in Colorado.
- October 22 – Using a filament of carbonized thread, Thomas Edison tests the first practical electric light bulb (it lasts 13½ hours before burning out).
- November – Simmons College of Kentucky, a historically black school, is founded.
- December 31 – Thomas Edison demonstrates incandescent lighting to the public for the first time in Menlo Park, New Jersey.
- Undated – Laton Alton Huffman photographs Native American woman Pretty Nose.

=== Ongoing ===
- Gilded Age (1869–c. 1896)
- Depression of 1873–79 (1873–1879)

== Sport ==
- September 26 – The Providence Grays defeat the Boston Red Caps 7–6 to clinch their First National League pennant

== Births ==
- January 3 – Grace Coolidge, First Lady of the United States and Second Lady of the United States as wife of Calvin Coolidge (died 1957)
- January 12
  - Ray Harroun, race car driver (died 1968)
  - Calbraith Perry Rodgers, pioneer aviator, makes first transcontinental U.S. flight (died 1912 in aviation accident)
- January 13 – Melvin Jones, founder of Lions Clubs International (died 1961)
- January 20 – Ruth St. Denis, dancer (died 1968)
- February 3 – Guy Gillette, U.S. Senator from Iowa from 1936 to 1945 (died 1973)
- February 12 – George McGill, U.S. Senator from Kansas from 1930 to 1939 (died 1963)
- February 17 – Dorothy Canfield Fisher, activist and novelist (died 1958)
- March 6 – William P. Cronan, 19th Naval Governor of Guam (died 1929)
- March 18 – Emma Carus, opera singer (died 1927)
- March 27 – Edward Steichen, photographer, painter and curator (died 1973)
- April 1 – Louise Gunning, vaudeville singer (died 1960)
- April 9 – Thomas Meighan, film actor (died 1936)
- April 14 – James Branch Cabell, novelist (died 1958)
- April 24 – Oris Paxton Van Sweringen, financier (died 1936)
- May 3 – Clyde L. Herring, U.S. Senator from Iowa from 1937 to 1943 (died 1945)
- May 12
  - George Landenberger, U.S. Navy captain and 23rd Governor of American Samoa (died 1936)
  - Georgia Ann Robinson, community worker, first African American woman to be appointed a Los Angeles police officer (died 1961)
- May 19
  - Nancy Astor, née Langhorne, American-born British politician (died 1964 in the United Kingdom)
  - Waldorf Astor, American-born British politician and newspaper proprietor (died 1952 in the United Kingdom)
- May 22 – Eastwood Lane, composer (died 1951)
- June 3 – Raymond Pearl, biologist (died 1940)
- June 13 – Lois Weber, film director and screenwriter (died 1939)
- June 21 – Henry Creamer, songwriter (died 1930)
- July 1
  - Nicky Arnstein, professional gambler and con artist, married to Fanny Brice (died 1965)
  - H. Craig Severance, architect (died 1941)
- July 10 – Charles P. Snyder, admiral (died 1964)
- July 28 – Lucy Burns, women's rights campaigner (died 1966)
- August 2 – James M. Tunnell, U.S. Senator from Delaware from 1941 to 1947 (died 1957)
- August 8 – Wesley Newcomb Hohfeld, professor of jurisprudence (died 1918)
- August 15 – Ethel Barrymore, actress (died 1959)
- August 20 – Ralph Budd, railroad president (died 1962)
- August 27 – Otis F. Glenn, U.S. Senator from Illinois from 1928 to 1933 (died 1959)
- August 28 – Sydney Ayres, silent film actor (died 1916)
- September 13 – James Larkin Pearson, poet and newspaper publisher, North Carolina Poet Laureate from 1953 to 1981 (died 1981)
- September 14 – Margaret Sanger, birth control advocate (died 1966)
- September 19 – Louis Joseph Vance, novelist (died 1933)
- October 2 – Wallace Stevens, poet (died 1955)
- October 5 – Francis Peyton Rous, pathologist, recipient of the Nobel Prize in Physiology or Medicine in 1966 (died 1970)
- October 12 – Chris Smith, African American vaudeville composer and performer (died 1949)
- October 15 – Jane Darwell, née Patti Woodard, actress (died 1967)
- October 21 – Eugene Burton Ely, pioneer aviator (died 1911 in aviation accident)
- November 2 – Marion Jones Farquhar, tennis player (died 1965)
- November 4 – Will Rogers, humorist (died 1935)
- November 5 – Hannah J. Patterson, suffragist and social activist (died 1937)
- November 10 – Vachel Lindsay, poet (died 1931)
- November 15 – Lewis Stone, actor, known for playing Judge Hardy (died 1953)
- November 26 – Charles Goddard, playwright and screenwriter (died 1951)
- November 28 – Guy V. Howard, U.S. Senator from Minnesota from 1936 to 1937 (died 1954)
- December 1 – Beth Slater Whitson, lyricist (died 1930)
- December 4 – Richard Von Albade Gammon, University of Georgia football fullback (died 1897)
- December 5 – Clyde Cessna, aviator, aircraft designer and manufacturer (died 1954)
- December 10 – Jouett Shouse, politician (died 1968)
- December 12 – Laura Hope Crews, actress (died 1942)
- December 15 – Bert H. Miller, U.S. Senator from Idaho in 1949 (died 1949)
- December 20 – Earle Ovington, aviator, flew first experimental airmail (died 1936)
- December 25 – Grace George, actress (died 1961)
- December 26 – Christie Benet, U.S. Senator from South Carolina in 1918 (died 1951)
- December 28
  - Arthur O. Austin, electrical engineer and inventor (died 1964)
  - Billy Mitchell, general, military aviation pioneer (died 1936)

== Deaths ==
- February 2 – Richard Henry Dana Sr., poet, critic and lawyer (born 1787)
- March 2
  - John Eberhard Faber, pencil manufacturer (born 1822 in Germany)
  - Wade Keyes, Acting Confederate States Attorney General in 1861 and 1863–1864 (born 1821)
- March 16 – George Goldthwaite, U.S. Senator from Alabama from 1871 to 1877 (born 1809)
- April 12 – Richard Taylor, Confederate general (born 1826)
- April 26 – James Patton Brownlow, U.S. Army colonel (born 1842)
- April 30 – Sarah Josepha Hale, writer (born 1788)
- May 24 – William Lloyd Garrison, abolitionist (born 1805)
- June 1
  - James Shields, U.S. Senator from Illinois from 1849 to 1855, from Minnesota from 1858 to 1859 and from Missouri in 1879 (born 1810 in Ireland)
  - Louisa Caroline Huggins Tuthill, children's writer (born 1799)
- June 26 – Richard H. Anderson, United States Army officer during the Mexican–American War, Confederate general during the American Civil War (born 1821)
- July 4 – Sarah Dorsey, novelist and historian (born 1829)
- July 7 – George Caleb Bingham, realist painter (born 1811)
- July 11 – William Allen, U.S. Senator from Ohio from 1837 to 1849 (born 1803)
- July 16 – Frederick Langenheim, pioneer of panoramic photography (born 1809 in Germany)
- July 26 – Robert Ward Johnson, U.S. Senator from Arkansas from 1862 to 1865 (born 1814)
- August 30 – John Bell Hood, Confederate general (born 1831)
- September 8 – William Morris Hunt, painter (born 1824)
- September 30 – Francis Gillette, U.S. Senator from Connecticut from 1854 to 1855 (born 1807)
- October 11 – Ethel Lynn Beers, poet (born 1827)
- October 13 – Henry Charles Carey, economist (born 1793)
- October 26 – Angelina Grimké, abolitionist writer (born 1805)
- October 31
  - Jacob Abbott, children's writer (born 1803)
  - Joseph Hooker, Union Army general during the American Civil War (born 1814)
- November 1 – Zachariah Chandler, U.S. Senator from Michigan from 1857 to 1875 and in 1879 (born 1813)
- December 31 – George S. Houston, Governor of Alabama from 1874 to 1878 and U.S. Senator from Alabama in 1879 (born 1811)

== See also ==
- Timeline of United States history (1860–1899)
