= 1821 in the United States =

- Decades: 1800s; 1810s; 1820s; 1830s; 1840s
- See also: History of the United States (1789–1849); Timeline of United States history (1820–1859); List of years in the United States

Events from the year 1821 in the United States.

== Incumbents ==
=== Federal government ===
- President: James Monroe (DR-Virginia)
- Vice President: Daniel D. Tompkins (DR-New York)
- Chief Justice: John Marshall (Virginia)
- Speaker of the House of Representatives:

John W. Taylor (DR-New York) (until March 4)
Philip P. Barbour (DR-Virginia) (starting December 4)

- Congress: 16th (until March 4), 17th (starting March 4)

==== State governments ====
Governors and lieutenant governors

=== Governors ===
- Governor of Alabama: Thomas Bibb (Democratic-Republican) (until November 9), Israel Pickens (Democratic-Republican) (starting November 9)
- Governor of Connecticut: Oliver Wolcott Jr. (Toleration)
- Governor of Delaware: Jacob Stout (Federalist) (until January 16), John Collins (Democratic-Republican) (starting January 16)
- Governor of Georgia: John Clark (Democratic-Republican)
- Governor of Illinois: Shadrach Bond (Independent)
- Governor of Indiana: Jonathan Jennings (Democratic-Republican)
- Governor of Kentucky: John Adair (Democratic-Republican)
- Governor of Louisiana: Thomas Bolling Robertson (Democratic-Republican)
- Governor of Maine:
  - until May 28:William King (Democratic-Republican)
  - May 28-December 5: William D. Williamson (Democratic-Republican)
  - starting December 5: Benjamin Ames (Democratic-Republican)
- Governor of Maryland: Samuel Sprigg (Democratic)
- Governor of Massachusetts: John Brooks (Federalist)
- Governor of Mississippi: George Poindexter (Democratic-Republican)
- Governor of Missouri: William Clark (Democratic-Republican) (until August 10), Alexander McNair (Democratic-Republican) (starting August 10)
- Governor of New Hampshire: Samuel Bell (Democratic-Republican)
- Governor of New Jersey: Isaac Halstead Williamson (Federalist)
- Governor of New York: DeWitt Clinton (Democratic-Republican)
- Governor of North Carolina: Jesse Franklin (Democratic-Republican) (until December 7), Gabriel Holmes (Democratic-Republican) (starting December 7)
- Governor of Ohio: Ethan Allen Brown (Democratic-Republican)
- Governor of Pennsylvania: Joseph Hiester (Democratic-Republican)
- Governor of Rhode Island: Nehemiah R. Knight (Democratic-Republican) (until May 2), William C. Gibbs (Democratic-Republican) (starting May 2)
- Governor of South Carolina: Thomas Bennett Jr. (Democratic-Republican)
- Governor of Tennessee: Joseph McMinn (Democratic-Republican) (until October 1), William Carroll (Democratic-Republican) (starting October 1)
- Governor of Vermont: Richard Skinner (Democratic-Republican)
- Governor of Virginia: Thomas Mann Randolph Jr. (Democratic-Republican)

=== Lieutenant governors ===
- Lieutenant Governor of Connecticut: Jonathan Ingersoll (Democratic-Republican)
- Lieutenant Governor of Illinois: Pierre Menard (Democratic-Republican)
- Lieutenant Governor of Indiana: Ratliff Boon (Democratic-Republican)
- Lieutenant Governor of Kentucky: William T. Barry (political party unknown)
- Lieutenant Governor of Massachusetts: William Phillips Jr. (political party unknown)
- Lieutenant Governor of Mississippi: James Patton (no political party)
- Lieutenant Governor of Missouri: William Henry Ashley (Democratic-Republican) (starting August 10)
- Lieutenant Governor of New York: John Tayler (Democratic-Republican)
- Lieutenant Governor of Rhode Island: Edward Wilcox (political party unknown) (until May 2), Caleb Earle (political party unknown) (starting May 2)
- Lieutenant Governor of South Carolina: William Pinckney (Democratic-Republican) (starting month and day unknown)
- Lieutenant Governor of Vermont: William Cahoon (Democratic-Republican)

== Events ==
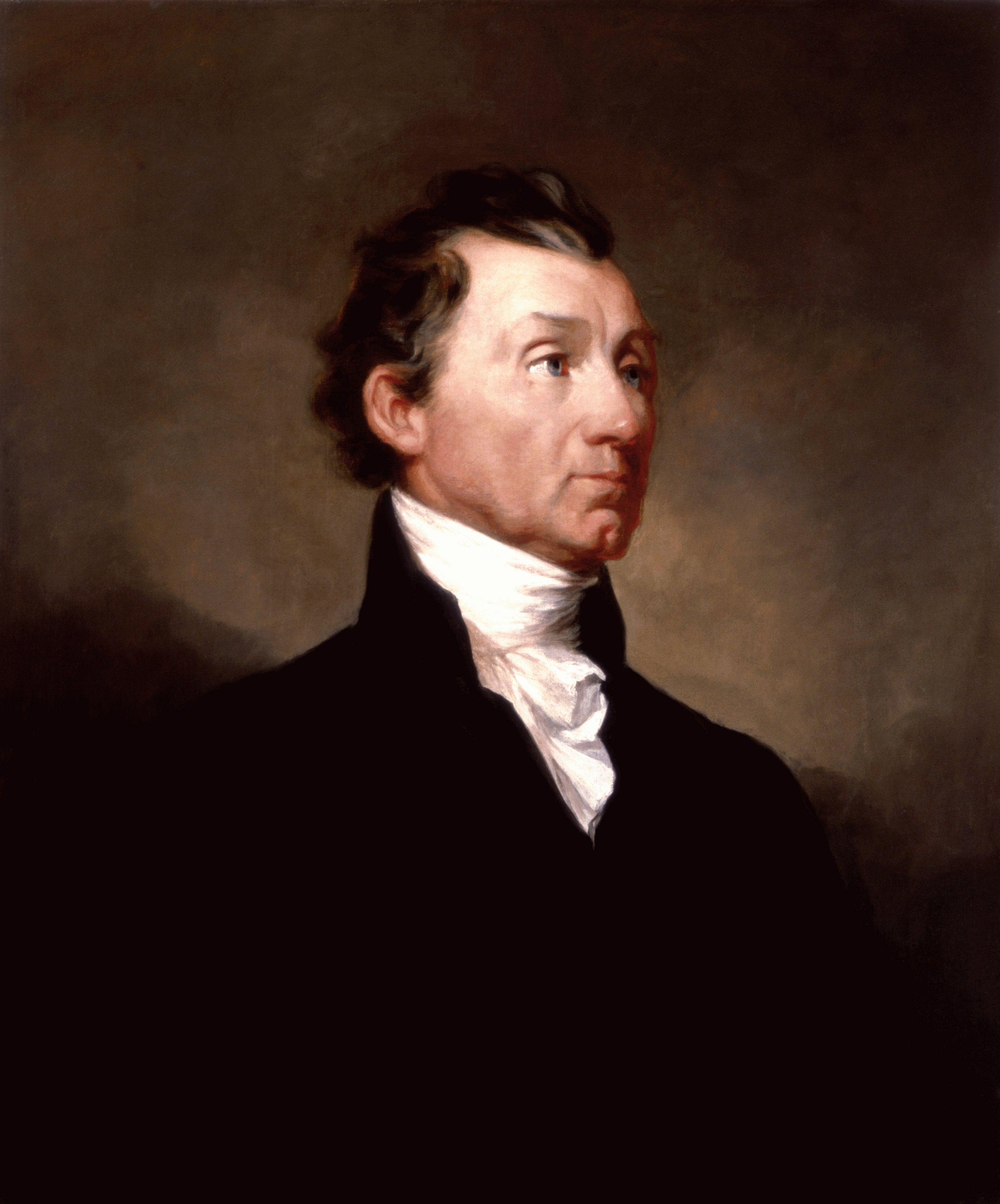
James Monroe by Samuel Morse

- February 9 – The George Washington University is chartered as The Columbian College of the District of Columbia by President James Monroe.
- March 4 – James Monroe and Daniel D. Tompkins begin their second terms as President and Vice President of the United States.
- March 5 – James Monroe is sworn in for his second term as President of the United States. Daniel D. Tompkins is sworn in for his second term as Vice President of the United States.
- June 27 – The New Hampton School is founded in the state of New Hampshire.
- July 10 – The U.S. takes possession of its newly bought territory of Florida from Spain.
- August 4 – The Saturday Evening Post is published for the first time, as a weekly newspaper.
- August 10 – Missouri is admitted as the 24th U.S. state (see History of Missouri).
- September 3 – The 1821 Norfolk and Long Island hurricane strikes New York City.
- September 18 – Amherst College is founded in Massachusetts.
- November 9 – Israel Pickens is sworn in as the third governor of Alabama, replacing Thomas Bibb.
- November 16 – American Old West: The Santa Fe Trail is used for the first time by a White American, William Becknell.
- History of Liberia – The first groups of freed slaves from the U.S. arrive in modern-day Liberia and found Monrovia.
- Widener University is founded in Wilmington, Delaware, as The Bullock School for Boys.
- Benjamin Lundy publishes the first issue of his abolitionist newspaper, Genius of Universal Emancipation.

=== Ongoing ===
- Era of Good Feelings (1817–1825)

== Births ==
- January 2 – Napoleon LeBrun, architect (died 1901)
- January 8 – James Longstreet, one of the foremost Confederate generals of the American Civil War (died 1904)
- January 16 – John C. Breckinridge, 14th vice president of the United States from 1857 to 1861, U.S. Senator from Kentucky in 1861 (died 1875)
- February 4 – Frederick Goddard Tuckerman, sonneteer (died 1873)
- February 19 – Francis Preston Blair Jr., U.S. Senator from Missouri from 1871 to 1873 (died 1875)
- March 20 – Ned Buntline (Edward Zane Carroll Judson Sr.), publisher, dime novelist and publicist (died 1886)
- April 12
  - Samuel G. Arnold, U.S. Senator from Rhode Island from 1862 to 1863 (died 1880)
  - Adonijah Welch, U.S. Senator from Florida from 1868 to 1869. (died 1889)
- April 15 – Joseph E. Brown, U.S. Senator from Georgia from 1880 to 1891 (died 1894)
- July 6 – Edmund Pettus, U.S. Senator from Alabama from 1897 to 1907 (died 1907)
- July 8 – Maria White Lowell, poet and abolitionist (died 1853)
- July 13 – Nathan Bedford Forrest, Confederate Civil War General, first Grand Wizard of the Ku Klux Klan (died 1877)
- September 22 – John Conness, Irish-born U.S. Senator from California from 1863 to 1869 (died 1909)
- October 7 – Richard H. Anderson, United States Army officer during the Mexican–American War, Confederate general during the American Civil War (died 1879)
- October 10 – Wade Keyes, Acting Confederate States Attorney General in 1861 and 1863–1864 (died 1879)
- October 22 – Collis P. Huntington, railroad promoter (died 1900)
- December 25 – Clara Barton, humanitarian and founder of the American branch of the Red Cross. (died 1912)

== Deaths ==
- January 4 – Elizabeth Ann Seton, saint (born 1774)
- March 13 – Waightstill Avery, lawyer and soldier, fought a duel with Andrew Jackson (born 1741)
- October 11 – John Ross Key, commissioned officer in the Continental Army, judge, lawyer and father of Francis Scott Key (born 1754)
- October 24 – Elias Boudinot, President of the Continental Congress (born 1740)
- Full date unknown – Lucy Terry first known African American poet (born c. 1730 in Africa)

== See also ==
- Timeline of United States history (1820–1859)
