= 1811 in the United States =

- Decades: 1790s; 1800s; 1810s; 1820s; 1830s
- See also: History of the United States (1789–1849); Timeline of United States history (1790–1819); List of years in the United States

Events from the year 1811 in the United States.

== Incumbents ==
=== Federal government ===
- President: James Madison (DR-Virginia)
- Vice President: George Clinton (DR-New York)
- Chief Justice: John Marshall (Virginia)
- Speaker of the House of Representatives:

Joseph Bradley Varnum (DR-Massachusetts) (until March 4)
Henry Clay (DR-Kentucky) (starting November 4)

- Congress: 11th (until March 4), 12th (starting March 4)

==== State governments ====
Governors and lieutenant governors

=== Governors ===
- Governor of Connecticut: John Treadwell (Federalist) (until May 9), Roger Griswold (Federalist) (starting May 9)
- Governor of Delaware: George Truitt (Federalist) (until January 15), Joseph Haslet (Democratic-Republican) (starting January 15)
- Governor of Georgia: David Brydie Mitchell (Democratic-Republican)
- Governor of Kentucky: Charles Scott (Democratic-Republican)
- Governor of Maryland: Edward Lloyd (Democratic-Republican) (until November 16), Robert Bowie (Democratic-Republican) (starting November 16)
- Governor of Massachusetts: Elbridge Gerry (Democratic-Republican)
- Governor of New Hampshire: John Langdon (Democratic-Republican)
- Governor of New Jersey: Joseph Bloomfield (Democratic-Republican)
- Governor of New York: Daniel D. Tompkins (Democratic-Republican)
- Governor of North Carolina: David Stone (Democratic-Republican) (until December 11), William Hawkins (Democratic-Republican) (starting December 11)
- Governor of Ohio: Return J. Meigs Jr. (Democratic-Republican)
- Governor of Pennsylvania: Simon Snyder (Democratic-Republican)
- Governor of Rhode Island: James Fenner (Democratic-Republican) (until May 1), William Jones (Federalist) (starting May 1)
- Governor of South Carolina: Henry Middleton (Democratic-Republican)
- Governor of Tennessee: Willie Blount (Democratic-Republican)
- Governor of Vermont: Jonas Galusha (Democratic-Republican)
- Governor of Virginia:
  - until January 15: John Tyler Sr. (Democratic-Republican)
  - January 15–19: George William Smith (Democratic-Republican)
  - January 19 – April 3: James Monroe (Democratic-Republican)
  - April 3 – December 26: George William Smith (Democratic-Republican)
  - December 26–27: vacant
  - starting December 27: Peyton Randolph (Democratic-Republican)

=== Lieutenant governors ===
- Lieutenant Governor of Connecticut: Roger Griswold (Federalist) (until May 9), John Cotton Smith (Federalist) (starting May 9)
- Lieutenant Governor of Kentucky: Gabriel Slaughter (political party unknown)
- Lieutenant Governor of Massachusetts: William Gray (political party unknown)
- Lieutenant Governor of New York: John Tayler (Democratic-Republican) (until month and day unknown), DeWitt Clinton (Democratic-Republican) (starting month and day unknown)
- Lieutenant Governor of Rhode Island: Isaac Wilbour (Democratic-Republican) (until May 1), Simeon Martin (political party unknown) (starting May 1)
- Lieutenant Governor of South Carolina: Samuel Farrow (Democratic-Republican)
- Lieutenant Governor of Vermont: Paul Brigham (Democratic-Republican)

== Events ==
- January 8 – An unsuccessful slave revolt is led by Charles Deslandes in St. Charles and St. James, Louisiana.
- January 22 – The Casas Revolt begins in San Antonio, Texas.
- March 4 – The charter of the First Bank of the United States expires.
- March 22 – The Commissioners' Plan of 1811 for Manhattan is presented.
- July 9 – British explorer David Thompson posts a notice at the confluence of the Columbia and Snake Rivers (in modern-day Washington (state)) claiming the area for the United Kingdom.
- October 11 – Inventor John Stevens' boat, the Juliana, begins operation as the first steam-powered ferry (service between New York, New York, and Hoboken, New Jersey).
- November 7 – Battle of Tippecanoe: American troops led by William Henry Harrison defeat the Native American chief Tecumseh.
- December 16 – The New Madrid earthquake in Mississippi Valley near New Madrid reverses the course of the river for a while. Other earthquakes along the fault occur on January 23, 1812, and February 7, 1812.
- December 26 – The Richmond Theatre fire in Virginia kills 72 people, including the Governor of Virginia, George William Smith, and the president of the First National Bank of Virginia, Abraham B. Venable.
- Great Comet of 1811 visible overhead through the fall.

== Births ==
- January 5 – Richard Brodhead, U.S. Senator from Pennsylvania from 1851 to 1857 (died 1863)
- January 6 – Charles Sumner, U.S. Senator from Massachusetts from 1851 to 1874 (died 1874)
- January 16 – William Alexander Richardson, U.S. Senator from Illinois from 1863 to 1865 (died 1875)
- January 17 – George S. Houston, Governor of Alabama from 1874 to 1878 and U.S. Senator from Alabama in 1879 (died 1879)
- February 3 – Horace Greeley, author and statesman, founder and editor of the New-York Tribune (died 1872)
- February 4 – Asa Biggs, U.S. Senator from North Carolina from 1855 to 1858 (died 1878)
- February 8 – Edwin D. Morgan, 21st Governor of New York from 1859 to 1862 (died 1883)
- February 24
  - Edward Dickinson Baker, English-born U.S. Senator from Oregon from 1860 to 1861 (died 1861)
  - Henry S. Lane, U.S. Senator from Indiana from 1861 to 1867 (died 1881)
- March 15 – Robert Allen, Union Army brigadier general (died 1886)
- March 20 – George Caleb Bingham, artist, soldier and politician (died 1879)
- August 6 – Judah P. Benjamin, U.S. Senator from Louisiana from 1853 to 1861, 1st Confederate States Attorney General, 2nd Confederate States Secretary of War, 3rd Confederate States Secretary of State (died 1884)
- June 14 – Harriet Beecher Stowe, abolitionist and author best known for the novel Uncle Tom's Cabin (died 1896)
- July 11 – Isaac A. Van Amburgh, animal trainer (died 1865)
- December 19 – Aaron Shaw, U.S. Representative from Illinois (died 1887)

== Deaths ==
- June 19 – Samuel Chase, Associate Justice of the United States Supreme Court, signatory of the Declaration of Independence (born 1741)
- August 2 – William Williams, signatory of the Declaration of Independence (born 1731)

== See also ==
- Timeline of United States history (1790–1819)
