= Ethel May Halls =

American film and theatre actress

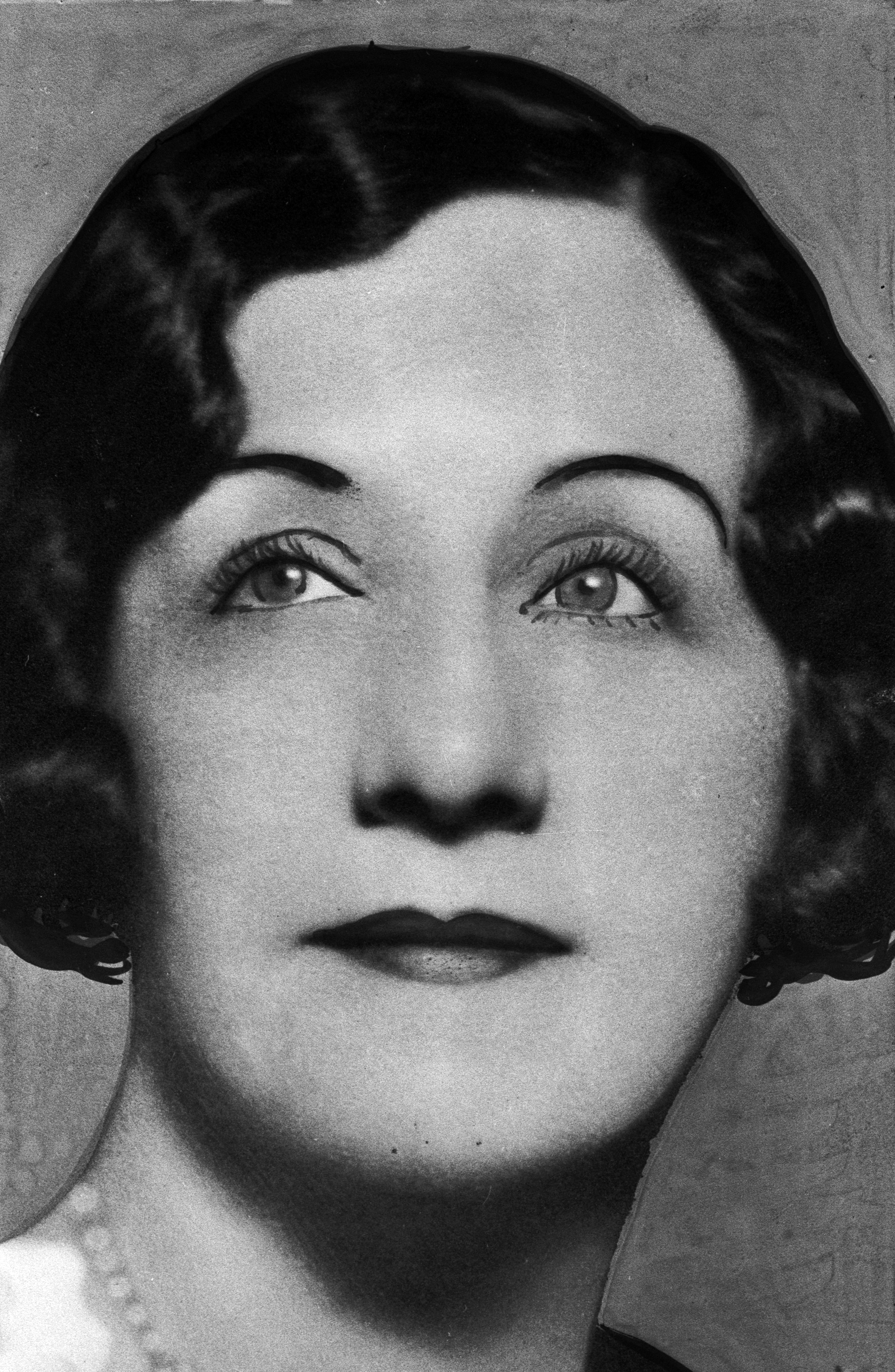
Ethel May Halls

Ethyl May Halls (November 20, 1882 – September 16, 1967) was an American film and theatre actress for nearly 70 years. After being a Florodora girl she worked for Biograph Studios for several years in films with among others Mary Pickford and Rudolph Valentino. She appeared in many bit parts in Hollywood right up until the 1940s.

Halls was born in Canada and died September 16, 1967, in Hollywood, California.
