= George Barker (painter) =

American painter

George Barker (9 May 1882 – 1965) was a portrait and landscape painter from the United States. Born in Omaha, Nebraska, much of his work was done in Southern California. While teaching at Long Beach Polytechnic High School in the late 1920s, he mentored several art students that later went on to being accomplished artist themselves. Among them were John Williams, Sueyo Serisawa and Alan Woods.
