= Richard Hickman =

American politician

Richard Hickman (1757–1832) was the fifth lieutenant governor of Kentucky, serving in that capacity from 1812 to 1816 under Isaac Shelby during Shelby's second term as governor.

Hickman was born in Virginia in 1757 to Maj. James Hickman and Hannah Lewis Hickman. He served as Clark County's first legislative representative from 1793 to 1798. He further served on the 1799 Kentucky Constitutional Convention. Following the Constitutional Convention, he became one of the first twelve men to be members of the Kentucky Senate, and served in that body three separate times from 1800 to 1808, again from 1811 to 1812, and finally from 1819 to 1822.

He was elected Lieutenant Governor of Kentucky under Governor Isaac Shelby, and served briefly as acting governor in 1813, during the time that Shelby was leading Kentucky troops in the War of 1812.

Hickman is U.S. President Barack Obama's 7th-great uncle.

Political offices
Preceded by Gabriel Slaughter	Lieutenant Governor of Kentucky; 1812–1816	Succeeded by Gabriel Slaughter
