= William Phillips Jr. =

American politician (1750–1827)

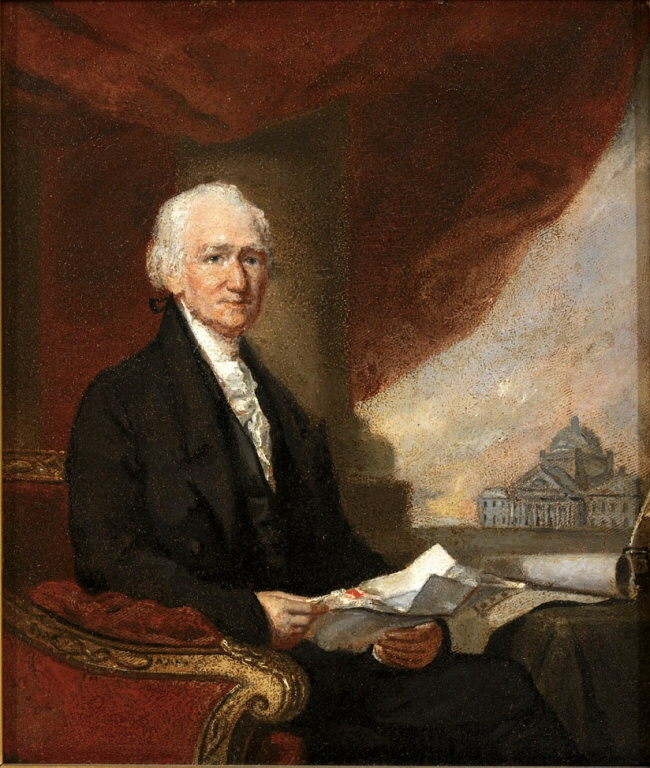

10th Lieutenant Governor of Massachusetts
- In office 1812–1823
- Governor: Caleb Strong; John Brooks
- Preceded by: William Gray
- Succeeded by: Levi Lincoln Jr.

Personal details
- Born: March 30, 1750 Boston, Massachusetts
- Died: May 26, 1827 (aged 77) Boston, Massachusetts
- Party: Federalist

William Phillips Jr. (March 30, 1750 – May 26, 1827) was a Boston merchant, politician and philanthropist.

Phillips was born in Boston, Massachusetts, the son of William Phillips Sr. He joined his father in business and became wealthy. He was a descendant of Rev. George Phillips of Watertown, the progenitor of the New England Phillips family in America.

Phillips was elected the tenth lieutenant governor of Massachusetts, serving from 1812 to 1823. He drafted the letter inviting New England Governors to send delegates to the Hartford Convention of 1815. On his death, he bequeathed large sums to Phillips Academy, Andover, and to Andover Theological Seminary.

Phillips married Miriam Mason (1754–1823) on September 13, 1774, in Norwich, Massachusetts. They had seven children. Phillips was the grandfather of Samuel H. Walley who was a U.S. representative from Massachusetts.

He was also the first president of the Massachusetts General Hospital and has a building there named after him.

Phillips was elected a member of the American Antiquarian Society in 1813. He died in Boston.

The town of Phillipston, Massachusetts was named after Phillips on February 5, 1814.

Political offices
Preceded by William Gray	Lieutenant Governor of Massachusetts; 1812–1823	Succeeded by Levi Lincoln Jr.
