= 1955 in the United States =

- Decades: 1930s; 1940s; 1950s; 1960s; 1970s
- See also: History of the United States (1945–1964); Timeline of United States history (1950–1969); List of years in the United States

Events from the year 1955 in the United States.

== Incumbents ==
=== Federal government ===
- President: Dwight D. Eisenhower (R-Kansas/New York)
- Vice President: Richard Nixon (R-California)
- Chief Justice: Earl Warren (California)
- Speaker of the House of Representatives:

Joseph William Martin Jr. (R-Massachusetts) (until January 3)
Sam Rayburn (D-Texas) (starting January 3)

- Senate Majority Leader:

William F. Knowland (R-California) (until January 3)
Lyndon B. Johnson (D-Texas) (starting January 3)

- Congress: 83rd (until January 3), 84th (starting January 3)

==== State governments ====
Governors and lieutenant governors

=== Governors ===
- Governor of Alabama: Gordon Persons (Democratic) (until January 17), Jim Folsom (Democratic) (starting January 17)
- Governor of Arizona: John Howard Pyle (Republican) (until January 3), Ernest McFarland (Democratic) (starting January 3)
- Governor of Arkansas: Francis Cherry (Democratic) (until January 11), Orval Faubus (Democratic) (starting January 11)
- Governor of California: Goodwin Knight (Republican)
- Governor of Colorado: Daniel I.J. Thornton (Republican) (until January 11), Edwin C. Johnson (Democratic) (starting January 11)
- Governor of Connecticut: John Davis Lodge (Republican) (until January 5), Abraham A. Ribicoff (Democratic) (starting January 5)
- Governor of Delaware: J. Caleb Boggs (Republican)
- Governor of Florida: Charley Eugene Johns (Democratic) (until January 4), LeRoy Collins (Democratic) (starting January 4)
- Governor of Georgia: Herman Talmadge (Democratic) (until January 11), Marvin Griffin (Democratic) (starting January 11)
- Governor of Idaho: Len Jordan (Republican) (until January 3), Robert E. Smylie (Republican) (starting January 3)
- Governor of Illinois: William G. Stratton (Republican)
- Governor of Indiana: George N. Craig (Republican)
- Governor of Iowa: Leo Elthon (Republican) (until January 13), Leo A. Hoegh (Republican) (starting January 13)
- Governor of Kansas: Edward F. Arn (Republican) (until January 10), Fred Hall (Republican) (starting January 10)
- Governor of Kentucky: Lawrence W. Wetherby (Democratic) (until December 13), Happy Chandler (Democratic) (starting December 13)
- Governor of Louisiana: Robert F. Kennon (Democratic)
- Governor of Maine: Burton M. Cross (Republican) (until January 5), Edmund Muskie (Democratic) (starting January 5)
- Governor of Maryland: Theodore R. McKeldin (Republican)
- Governor of Massachusetts: Christian A. Herter (Republican)
- Governor of Michigan: G. Mennen Williams (Democratic)
- Governor of Minnesota: C. Elmer Anderson (Republican) (until January 5), Orville L. Freeman (Democratic) (starting January 5)
- Governor of Mississippi: Hugh L. White (Democratic)
- Governor of Missouri: Phil M. Donnelly (Democratic)
- Governor of Montana: J. Hugo Aronson (Republican)
- Governor of Nebraska: Robert B. Crosby (Republican) (until January 6), Victor Anderson (Republican) (starting January 6)
- Governor of Nevada: Charles H. Russell (Republican)
- Governor of New Hampshire: Hugh Gregg (Republican) (until January 6), Lane Dwinell (Republican) (starting January 6)
- Governor of New Jersey: Robert B. Meyner (Democratic)
- Governor of New Mexico: Edwin L. Mechem (Republican) (until January 1), John F. Simms (Democratic) (starting January 1)
- Governor of New York: W. Averell Harriman (Democratic) (starting January 1)
- Governor of North Carolina: Luther H. Hodges (Democratic)
- Governor of North Dakota: Clarence Norman Brunsdale (Republican)
- Governor of Ohio: Frank J. Lausche (Democratic)
- Governor of Oklahoma: Johnston Murray (Democratic) (until January 10), Raymond D. Gary (Democratic) (starting January 10)
- Governor of Oregon: Paul L. Patterson (Republican)
- Governor of Pennsylvania: John S. Fine (Republican) (until January 18), George M. Leader (Democratic) (starting January 18)
- Governor of Rhode Island: Dennis J. Roberts (Democratic)
- Governor of South Carolina: James Francis Byrnes (Democratic) (until January 18), George Bell Timmerman Jr. (Democratic) (starting January 18)
- Governor of South Dakota: Sigurd Anderson (Republican) (until January 4), Joe Foss (Republican) (starting January 4)
- Governor of Tennessee: Frank G. Clement (Democratic)
- Governor of Texas: Allan Shivers (Democratic)
- Governor of Utah: J. Bracken Lee (Republican)
- Governor of Vermont: Lee E. Emerson (Republican) (until January 6), Joseph B. Johnson (Republican) (starting January 6)
- Governor of Virginia: Thomas Bahnson Stanley (Democratic)
- Governor of Washington: Arthur B. Langlie (Republican)
- Governor of West Virginia: William C. Marland (Democratic)
- Governor of Wisconsin: Walter J. Kohler Jr. (Republican)
- Governor of Wyoming: Clifford Joy Rogers (Republican) (until January 3), Milward L. Simpson (Republican) (until January 3)

=== Lieutenant governors ===
- Lieutenant Governor of Alabama: James B. Allen (Democratic) (until January 17), William G. Hardwick (Democratic) (starting January 17)
- Lieutenant Governor of Arkansas: Nathan Green Gordon (Democratic)
- Lieutenant Governor of California: Harold J. Powers (Republican)
- Lieutenant Governor of Colorado: Gordon L. Allott (Republican) (until January 11), Stephen L. R. McNichols (Democratic) (starting January 11)
- Lieutenant Governor of Connecticut: Edward N. Allen (Republican) (until January 5), Charles W. Jewett (Democratic) (starting January 5)
- Lieutenant Governor of Delaware: John W. Rollins (Democratic)
- Lieutenant Governor of Georgia: Marvin Griffin (Democratic) (until January 11), S. Ernest Vandiver (Democratic) (starting January 11)
- Lieutenant Governor of Idaho: Edson H. Deal (Republican) (until January 3), J. Berkeley Larsen (Republican) (starting January 3)
- Lieutenant Governor of Illinois: John William Chapman (Republican)
- Lieutenant Governor of Indiana: Harold W. Handley (Republican)
- Lieutenant Governor of Iowa: Leo Elthon (Republican)
- Lieutenant Governor of Kansas: Fred Hall (Republican) (until January 10), John McCuish (Republican) (starting January 10)
- Lieutenant Governor of Kentucky: Emerson Beauchamp (Democratic) (until December 13), Harry Lee Waterfield (Democratic) (starting December 13)
- Lieutenant Governor of Louisiana: C. E. "Cap" Barham (Democratic)
- Lieutenant Governor of Massachusetts: Sumner G. Whittier (Republican)
- Lieutenant Governor of Michigan: Clarence A. Reid (Republican) (until January 1), Philip A. Hart (Democratic) (starting January 1)
- Lieutenant Governor of Minnesota: Donald O. Wright (Republican) (until month and day unknown), Karl Rolvaag (Democratic) (starting month and day unknown)
- Lieutenant Governor of Mississippi: Carroll Gartin (Democratic)
- Lieutenant Governor of Missouri: James T. Blair Jr. (Democratic)
- Lieutenant Governor of Montana: George M. Gosman (Republican)
- Lieutenant Governor of Nebraska: Charles J. Warner (Republican) (until September 24), vacant (starting September 24)
- Lieutenant Governor of Nevada: vacant (until month and day unknown), Rex Bell (Republican) (starting month and day unknown)
- Lieutenant Governor of New Mexico: Tibo J. Chávez (Democratic) (until January 1), Joseph Montoya (Democratic) (starting January 1)
- Lieutenant Governor of New York: vacant (until January 1), George DeLuca (Democratic) (starting January 1)
- Lieutenant Governor of North Carolina: vacant
- Lieutenant Governor of North Dakota: Clarence P. Dahl (Republican)
- Lieutenant Governor of Ohio: John William Brown (Republican)
- Lieutenant Governor of Oklahoma: James E. Berry (Democratic) (until month and day unknown), Cowboy Pink Williams (Democratic) (starting month and day unknown)
- Lieutenant Governor of Pennsylvania: Lloyd H. Wood (Republican) (until January 18), Roy E. Furman (Democratic) (starting January 18)
- Lieutenant Governor of Rhode Island: John S. McKiernan (Democratic)
- Lieutenant Governor of South Carolina: George Bell Timmerman Jr. (Democratic) (until January 18), Ernest Hollings (Democratic) (starting January 18)
- Lieutenant Governor of South Dakota: Rex A. Terry (Republican) (until January 4), L. Roy Houck (Republican) (starting January 4)
- Lieutenant Governor of Tennessee: Jared Maddux (Democratic)
- Lieutenant Governor of Texas: Ben Ramsey (Democratic)
- Lieutenant Governor of Vermont: Joseph B. Johnson (Republican) (until January 6), Consuelo N. Bailey (Republican) (starting January 6)
- Lieutenant Governor of Virginia: Allie Edward Stokes Stephens (Democratic)
- Lieutenant Governor of Washington: Emmett T. Anderson (Republican)
- Lieutenant Governor of Wisconsin: George M. Smith (Republican) (until January 3), Warren P. Knowles (Republican) (starting January 3)

== Events ==
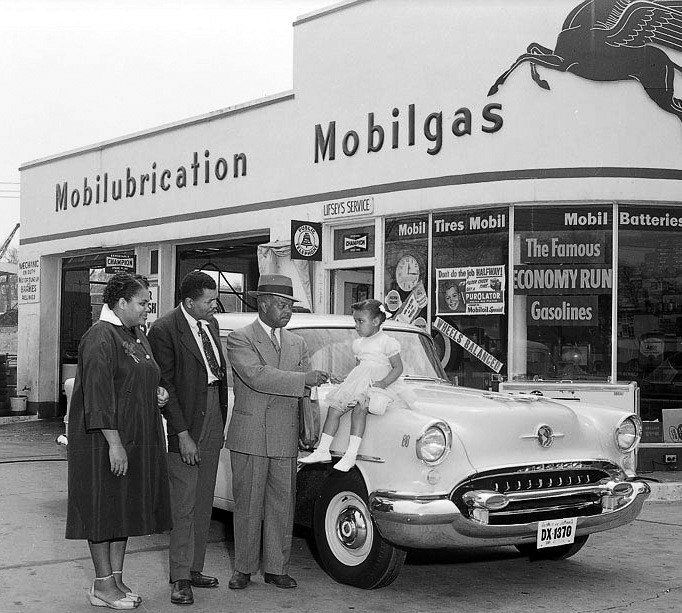
1955: An African American family with their new Oldsmobile in Washington, D.C.

=== January ===
- January 7 – Marian Anderson is the first African-American singer to perform at the Metropolitan Opera in New York City.
- January 22 – The Pentagon announces a plan to develop intercontinental ballistic missiles (ICBMs) armed with nuclear weapons.
- January 28 – The United States Congress authorizes President Dwight D. Eisenhower to use force to protect Formosa from the People's Republic of China.

=== February ===
- February 1 – Major tornadoes in Mississippi.
- February 10 – The Seventh Fleet of the United States Navy helps the Republic of China evacuate Chinese Nationalist army and residents from the Tachen Islands to Taiwan.
- February 12 – President Dwight D. Eisenhower sends the first U.S. advisors to South Vietnam.
- February 14 – WFLA-TV signs on the air in Tampa/St. Petersburg, Florida.
- February 22 – In Chicago's Democratic primary, Mayor Martin H. Kennelly loses to the head of the Cook County Democratic Party, Richard J. Daley, 364,839 to 264,77.

=== March ===
- March 9 – Claudette Colvin, a fifteen-year-old African-American girl, refuses to give up her seat on a bus in Montgomery, Alabama, to a white woman after the driver demands it. She is carried off the bus backwards whilst being kicked and handcuffed and harassed on the way to the police station. She becomes a plaintiff in Browder v. Gayle (1956), which rules bus segregation to be unconstitutional.
- March 5 – WBBJ signs on the air in the Jackson, Tennessee as WDXI, to expanded U.S. commercial television in rural areas.
- March 7 – The 1954 Broadway musical version of Peter Pan, starring Mary Martin, is presented on television for the first time by NBC (also the first time that a stage musical is presented in its entirety on TV exactly as performed on stage). The program gains the largest viewership of a TV special up to this time and becomes one of the first great television classics.
- March 12 – African-American jazz saxophonist Charlie Parker dies in New York City at age 34.
- March 19 – KXTV of Stockton, California signs on the air as the 100th commercial television station in the U.S.
- March 20 – The film adaptation of Evan Hunter's Blackboard Jungle premieres, featuring the famous single "Rock Around the Clock" by Bill Haley & His Comets. Teenagers jump from their seats to dance to the song. On July 9 it becomes the first Rock and roll single to reach Number One on the U.S. charts.
- March 26 – Bill Hayes tops the U.S. charts for five weeks with "The Ballad of Davy Crockett" and starts a (fake) coonskin cap craze.
- March 28 – The important income tax case of Commissioner v. Glenshaw Glass Co. is decided in the Supreme Court.
- March 30 – The 27th Academy Awards ceremony is simultaneously held at RKO Pantages Theatre in Hollywood (hosted by Bob Hope) and at NBC Century Theatre in New York (hosted by Thelma Ritter). Elia Kazan's On the Waterfront wins and receives the most respective awards and nominations with eight and 12, including Best Motion Picture and Kazan's second Best Director win.

=== April ===
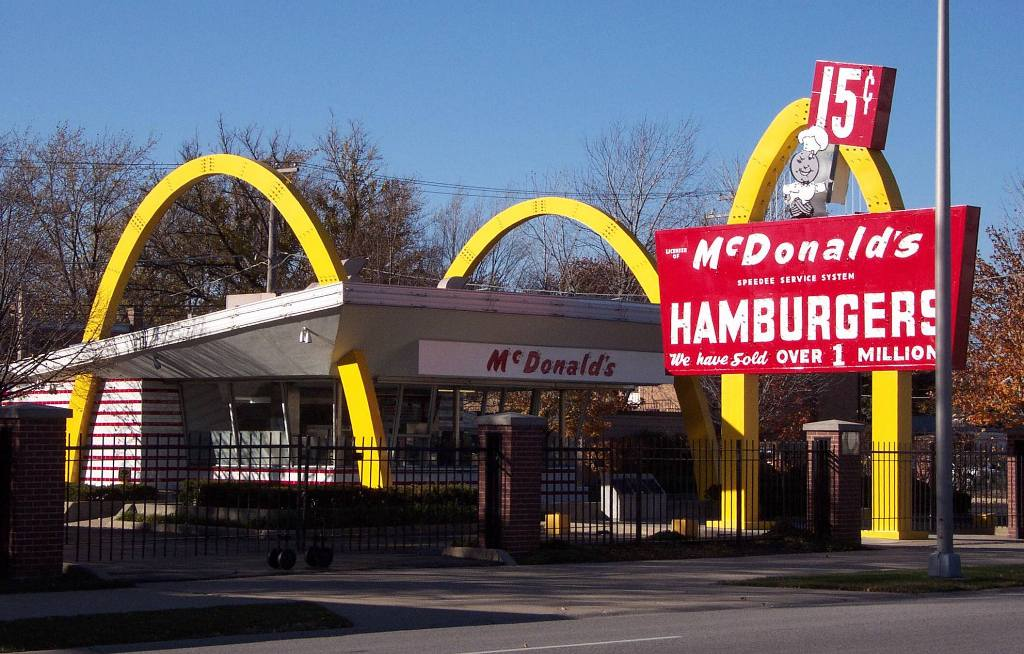
April 15: McDonald's

- April – Theresa Meikle becomes the presiding judge of San Francisco County Superior Court, the first woman elected to such a position in any major U.S. city.
- April 5 – Richard J. Daley defeats Robert Merrian to become mayor of Chicago by a vote of 708,222 to 581,555.
- April 10 – In the National Basketball Association championship, the Syracuse Nationals defeat the Fort Wayne Pistons 92-91 in Game 7 to win the title.
- April 12 – Jonas Salk's polio vaccine, having passed large-scale trials earlier in the U.S., receives full approval by the Food and Drug Administration.
- April 14 – The Detroit Red Wings win the Stanley Cup in ice hockey for the 7th time in franchise history, but will not win again until 1997.
- April 15 – Ray Kroc opens his first McDonald's in Des Plaines, Illinois.

=== May ===
- May 9 – A young Jim Henson introduces the earliest version of Kermit the Frog (made in March), in the premiere of his puppet show Sam and Friends, on WRC-TV in Washington, D.C.
- May 21 – Chuck Berry records his first single, "Maybellene", for Chess Records in Chicago.

=== June ===
- June 7 – The $64,000 Question premieres on CBS television, with Hal March as the host.
- June 16 – Lady and the Tramp premieres in Chicago. It is the first animated film distributed by Disney's own Buena Vista Film Distribution and the first filmed in CinemaScope widescreen.

=== July ===
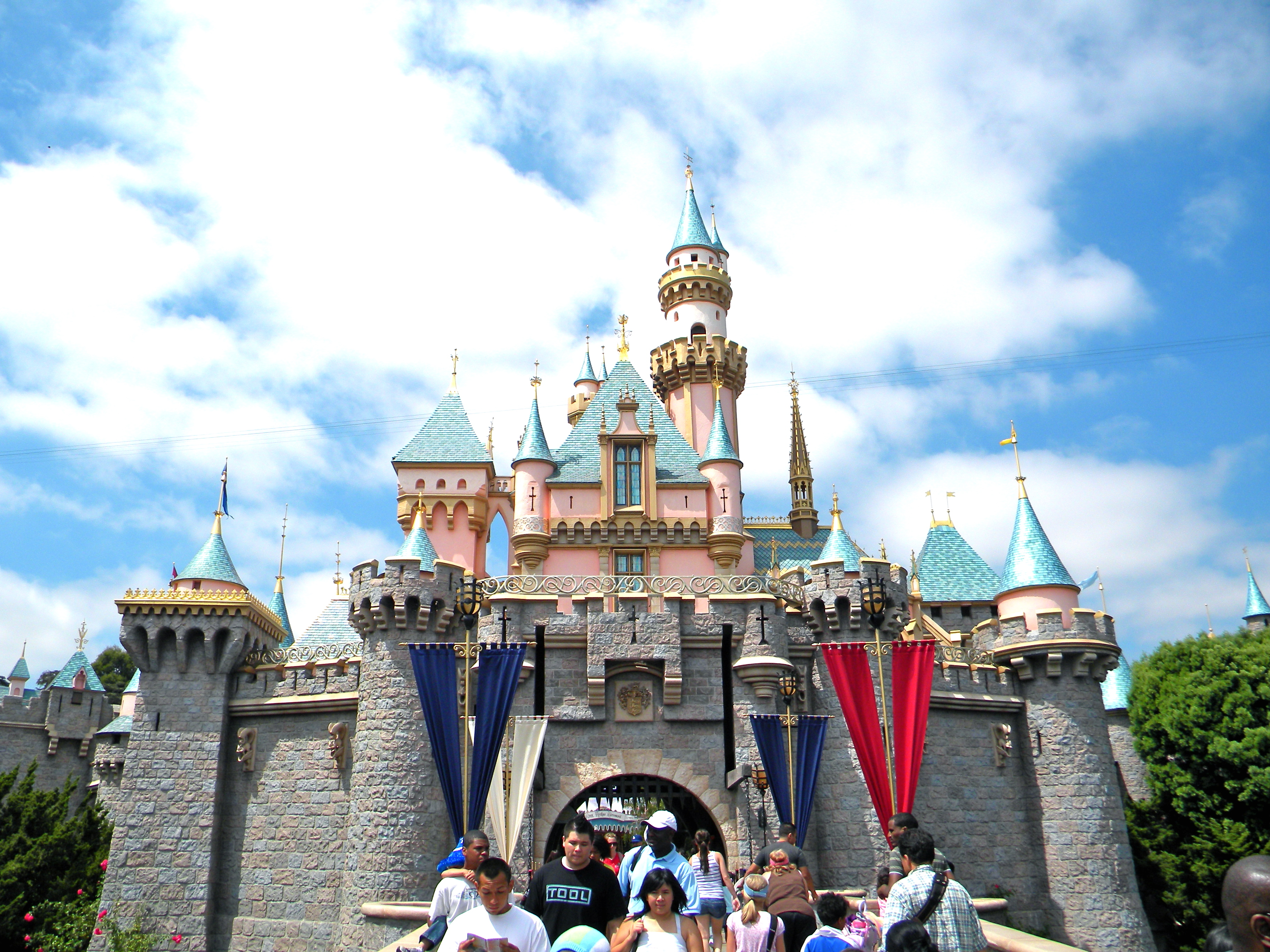
July 17: Disneyland opens

- July 17
  - The Disneyland theme park opens in Anaheim, California, an event broadcast on the ABC television network.
  - The first atomic-generated electrical power is sold commercially, partially powering Arco, Idaho, from the National Reactor Testing Station; on July 18, Schenectady, New York, receives power from a prototype nuclear submarine reactor at Knolls Atomic Power Laboratory.
- July 18 – Illinois Governor William Stratton signs the Loyalty Oath Act, that mandates all public employees take a loyalty oath to the State of Illinois and the U.S. or lose their jobs.
- July 18–23 – Geneva Summit between the U.S., Soviet Union, United Kingdom and France.

=== August ===
- August 1 – The prototype Lockheed U-2 reconnaissance aircraft first flies, in Nevada.
- August 4 – American Airlines Flight 476, a Convair CV-240-0 attempting an emergency landing at Forney Army Airfield, Fort Leonard Wood, Missouri following an engine fire, crashes just short of the runway; all 27 passengers and three crew members are killed.
- August 19 – Hurricane Diane hits the northeast, killing 200 and causing over $1 billion in damage.
- August 22 – Eleven schoolchildren are killed when their school bus is hit by a freight train in Spring City, Tennessee.
- August 28 – African-American teenager Emmett Till is lynched and shot in the head for allegedly grabbing and threatening a white woman, identified as Carolyn Bryant, in Money, Mississippi. His white murderers, Roy Bryant, the husband of Carolyn, and J. W. Milam, the half-brother of Roy, are acquitted by an all-white jury on September 23. Decades later, Carolyn recants her testimony.

=== September ===
- September 3 – African American rock singer Little Richard records "Tutti Frutti" in New Orleans; it is released in October.
- September 10 – Western series Gunsmoke debuts on the CBS television network.
- September 24 – President Dwight D. Eisenhower suffers a coronary thrombosis while on vacation in Denver.
- September 26 – "America's Sweethearts", singers Eddie Fisher and Debbie Reynolds, marry.
- September 30 – Film actor James Dean, aged 24, is killed when his Porsche 550 Spyder collides with another automobile at a highway junction near Cholame, California.

=== October ===
- October – First meeting of the lesbian group that becomes the Daughters of Bilitis.
- October 3 – The Mickey Mouse Club airs on the ABC television network.
- October 4 – The Brooklyn Dodgers win the World Series in baseball, defeating the New York Yankees 2–0 in Game 7 of the 1955 Fall Classic.
- October 7 – At the Six Gallery in San Francisco, Allen Ginsberg gives a spirited reading of his poem "Howl". Jack Kerouac and other Beat writers chant and shout along. The event is often seen as the birth of the counterculture.
- October 11 – 70-mm film is introduced with the theatrical release of Rodgers and Hammerstein's masterpiece Oklahoma!.
- October 20 – Disc jockey Bill Randle of WERE (Cleveland) is the key presenter of a concert at Brooklyn High School (Ohio), featuring Pat Boone and Bill Haley & His Comets and opening with Elvis Presley, not only Elvis's first performance north of the Mason–Dixon line, but also his first filmed performance, for a documentary on Randle titled The Pied Piper of Cleveland.
- October 27 – The film Rebel Without a Cause, starring James Dean, is released.

=== November ===
- November 1 – A time bomb explodes in the cargo hold of United Airlines Flight 629, a Douglas DC-6B airliner flying above Longmont, Colorado, killing all 39 passengers and five crew members.
- November 5 – Racial segregation is forbidden on trains and buses in U.S. interstate commerce.
- November 12 – The Bugs Bunny cartoon Roman-Legion Hare debuts.
- November 20 – Bo Diddley makes his television debut on Ed Sullivan's Toast Of The Town show for the CBS network.
- November 27 – Fred Phelps establishes the Westboro Baptist Church in Topeka, Kansas.

=== December ===
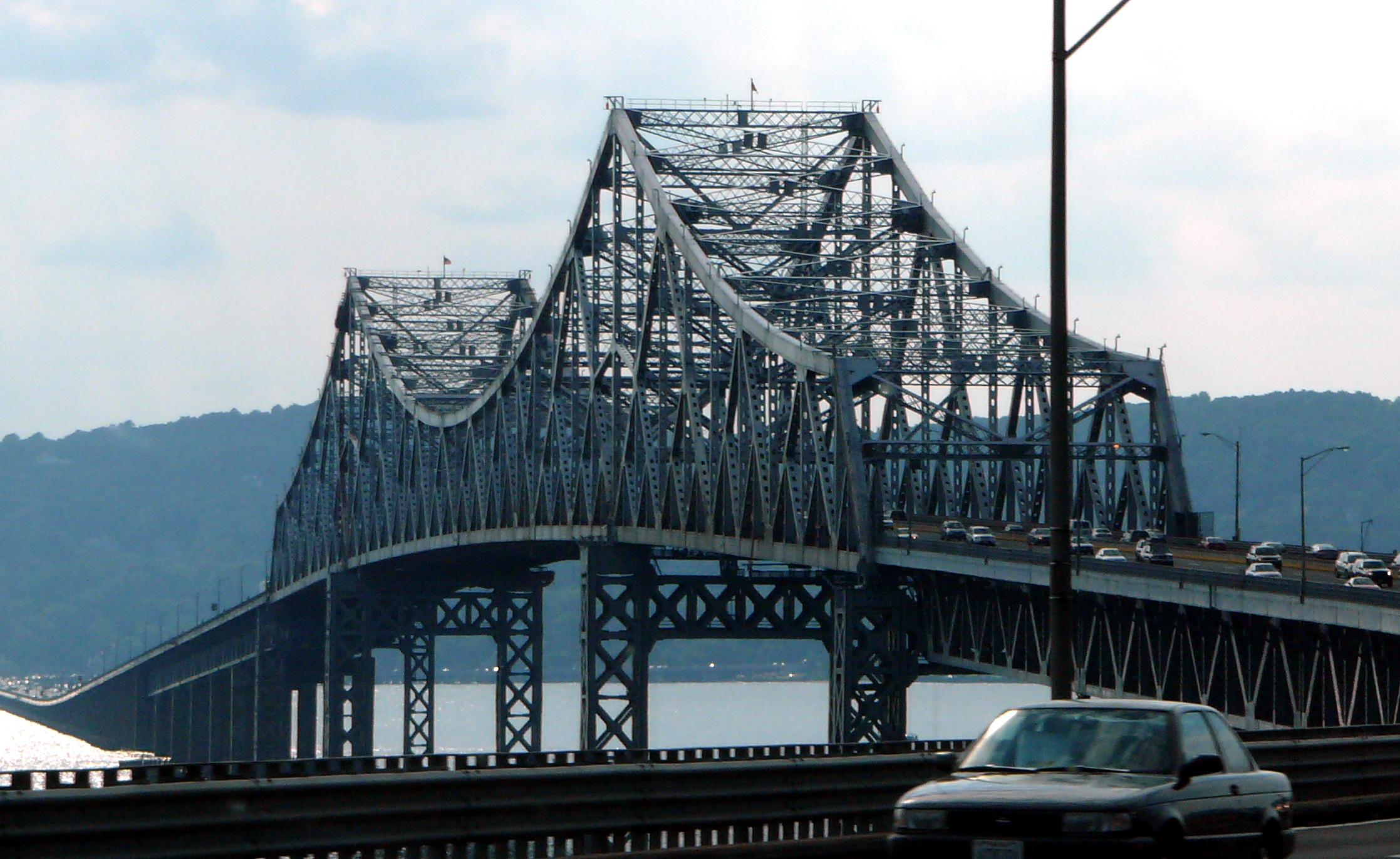
December 14: Tappan Zee Bridge

- December 1 – Rosa Parks is arrested for refusing to surrender her seat on a bus to a white person in Montgomery, Alabama.
- December 5
  - The American Federation of Labor and the Congress of Industrial Organizations merge to become the AFL–CIO.
  - The Montgomery Improvement Association is formed in Montgomery, Alabama by Dr. Martin Luther King Jr. and other Black ministers to coordinate the Montgomery bus boycott by Black people.
- December 14 – Tappan Zee Bridge in New York opens to traffic.
- December 15 – Johnny Cash's "Folsom Prison Blues", recorded on July 30, is released by Sun Records.
- December 22 – Cytogeneticist Joe Hin Tjio discovers the correct number of human chromosomes (46).
- December 31
  - General Motors becomes the first American corporation to make over US$1 billion in a year.
  - Michigan J. Frog, a Warner Bros. cartoon character, makes his debut in One Froggy Evening.

=== Unknown date ===
- The Peoria Zoo opens in Illinois.
- Agricultural tractors outnumber horses on U.S. farms for the first time.
- Tappan introduce the first domestic microwave oven.

=== Ongoing ===
- Cold War (1947–1991)
- Second Red Scare (1947–1957)

== Births ==
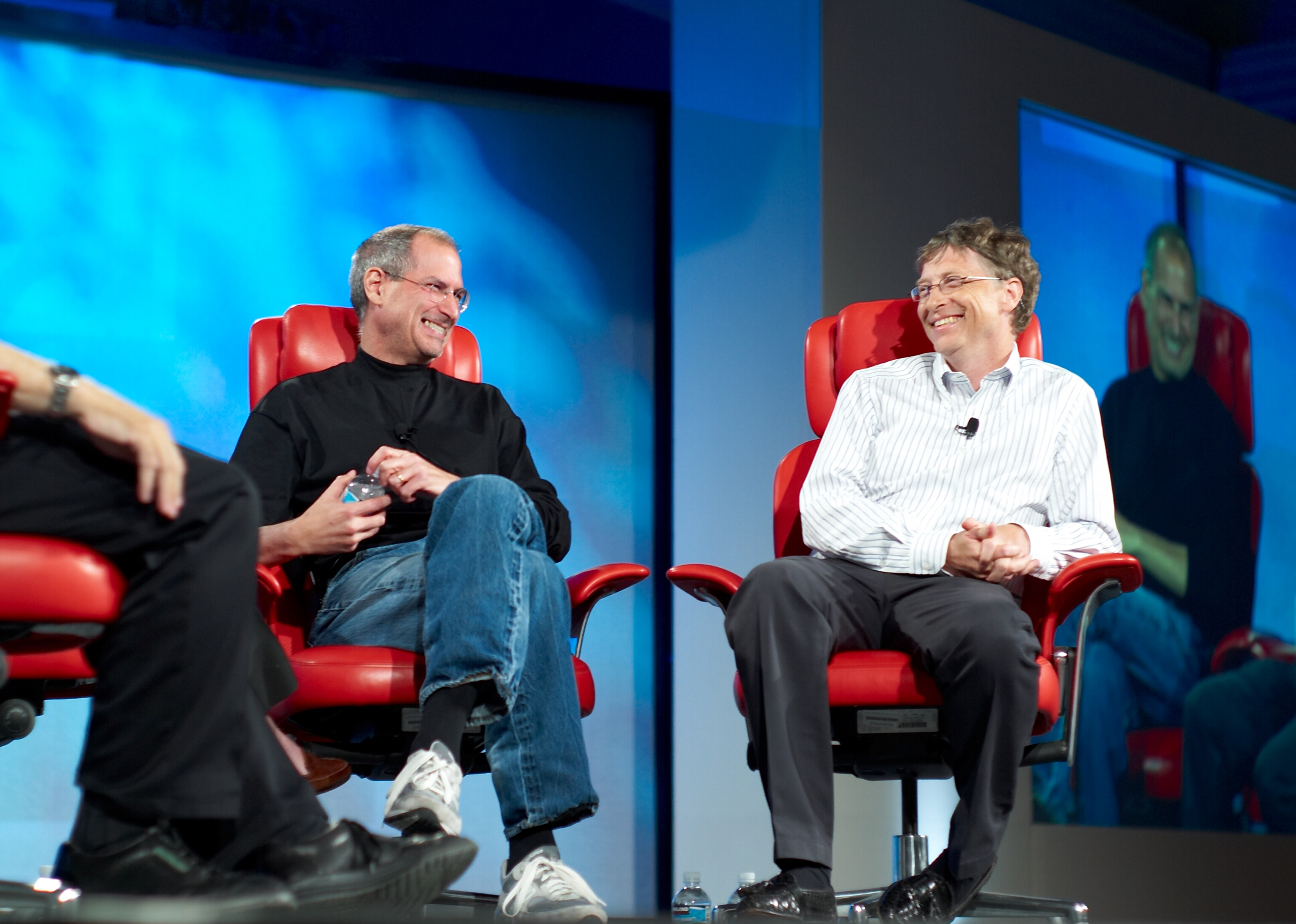
Steve Jobs and Bill Gates

=== January–June ===
- January 1 – LaMarr Hoyt, baseball player (d. 2021)
- January 2 – Bonnie Arnold, film producer
- January 3
  - Hal Rayle, voice actor
  - Jon Tiven, composer
- January 4
  - Cecilia Conrad, economist and academic
  - Brian Ray, session musician
  - Lea Fite, politician (d. 2009)
- January 9
  - Michiko Kakutani, journalist and critic
  - J. K. Simmons, actor
- January 11 – Max Lucado, writer on Christian themes
- January 12 – Rockne S. O'Bannon, writer and producer
- January 13 – Jay McInerney, novelist
- January 18 – Kevin Costner, film actor, producer and director
- January 21 – Jeff Koons, "kitsch" artist
- January 22 – Neil Bush, businessman and investor
- January 23 – Ruth Haring, chess player (d. 2018)
- January 24 – Lynda Weinman, author
- January 26 – Eddie Van Halen, guitarist and innovator (d. 2020)
- January 27 – John Roberts, Chief Justice of the Supreme Court of the U.S. from 2005
- January 28 – Joe Beckwith, baseball player (d. 2021)
- January 29 – Eddie Jordan, basketball player and coach and politician
- January 30
  - John Baldacci, politician, 73rd Governor of Maine
  - Tom Izzo, basketball player and coach
  - Curtis Strange, golfer and sportscaster
- February 6 – Michael Pollan, author and journalist
- February 8
  - John Grisham, writer of legal thrillers
  - Jim Neidhart, pro wrestler (d. 2018)
- February 10
  - Jim Cramer, hedge fund manager and television personality
  - Lusia Harris, basketball player (d. 2022)
- February 12
  - Bill Laswell, bass player and producer
  - Chet Lemon, baseball player (d. 2025)
- February 15
  - Janice Dickinson, model, agent, and author
  - Christopher McDonald, actor
- February 18
  - Cheetah Chrome, musician
  - Tim Hankinson, soccer coach (d. 2022)
  - Lisa See, novelist
- February 21 – Kelsey Grammer, TV actor
- February 21 – Kevin Carl Scholz, architect, entrepreneur, professor, artist and business owner
- February 23
  - Flip Saunders, basketball coach (d. 2015)
  - Francesca Simon, children's books writer
  - Jeffrey Sprecher, CEO of Intercontinental Exchange
- February 24 – Steve Jobs, entrepreneur and inventor (d. 2011)
- February 28 – Gilbert Gottfried, actor and stand-up comedian (d. 2022)
- March 2 – Ken Salazar, U.S. Senator from Colorado from 2005 to 2009
- March 5 – Penn Jillette, magician
- March 17 – Gary Sinise, film & TV actor
- March 19 – Bruce Willis, actor
- March 22 – Pete Sessions, politician
- March 30
  - Connie Cato, country music singer
  - Rhonda Jo Petty, pornographic actress
  - Randy VanWarmer, singer-songwriter (d. 2004)
- April 1
  - Terry Nichols, criminal
  - Martin H. Levenglick, lawyer, New York
- April 6 – Michael Rooker, actor
- April 7
  - Grace Hightower, philanthropist, actress and singer
  - Gregg Jarrett, lawyer-journalist
- April 8
  - Ricky Bell, American football player (d. 1984)
  - Ron Johnson, U.S. Senator from Wisconsin from 2011
  - Barbara Kingsolver, novelist, essayist and poet
  - William Spriggs, economist (d. 2023)
  - David Wu, Taiwanese-American lawyer and politician
- April 11 – Micheal Ray Richardson, basketball player and coach (d. 2025)
- April 16 – Bruce Bochy, French-born American baseball player and manager
- April 26 – Mike Scott, baseball player
- April 29 – Kate Mulgrew, TV actress
- April 30 – Fred Hiatt, journalist and editor (d. 2021)
- May 2 – Ed Murray, Democratic politician and former mayor of Seattle
- May 6 – Tom Bergeron, TV game show host
- May 7 – Ben Poquette, basketball player
- May 8 – Carl E. Douglas, lawyer
- May 10 – Mark David Chapman, murderer
- May 16
  - Dean Corren, politician and scientist (d. 2023)
  - Debra Winger, film actress
- May 17
  - Bill Paxton, film actor (d. 2017)
  - Marc Weiner, comedian, puppeteer, and actor
- May 18 – Brad Raffensperger, politician
- May 26
  - Randy Burke, American football player (d. 2025)
  - Wesley Walker, American football player and educator
- May 29 – John Hinckley Jr., attempted assassin of Ronald Reagan
- May 31
  - Bruce Adolphe, pianist, composer, and scholar
  - Marty Ehrlich, multi-instrumentalist (saxophone, clarinet, and flute)
- June 1
  - David Schultz, professional wrestler
  - Tony Snow, journalist (d. 2008)
- June 7 – Joey Scarbury, singer-songwriter
- June 12 – William Langewiesche, author and journalist (d. 2025)
- June 14 – Michael D. Duvall, businessman and politician
- June 16 – Laurie Metcalf, TV actress
- June 25 – Patricia Smith, African-American poet, "spoken-word performer", playwright, author and writing teacher

=== July–December ===
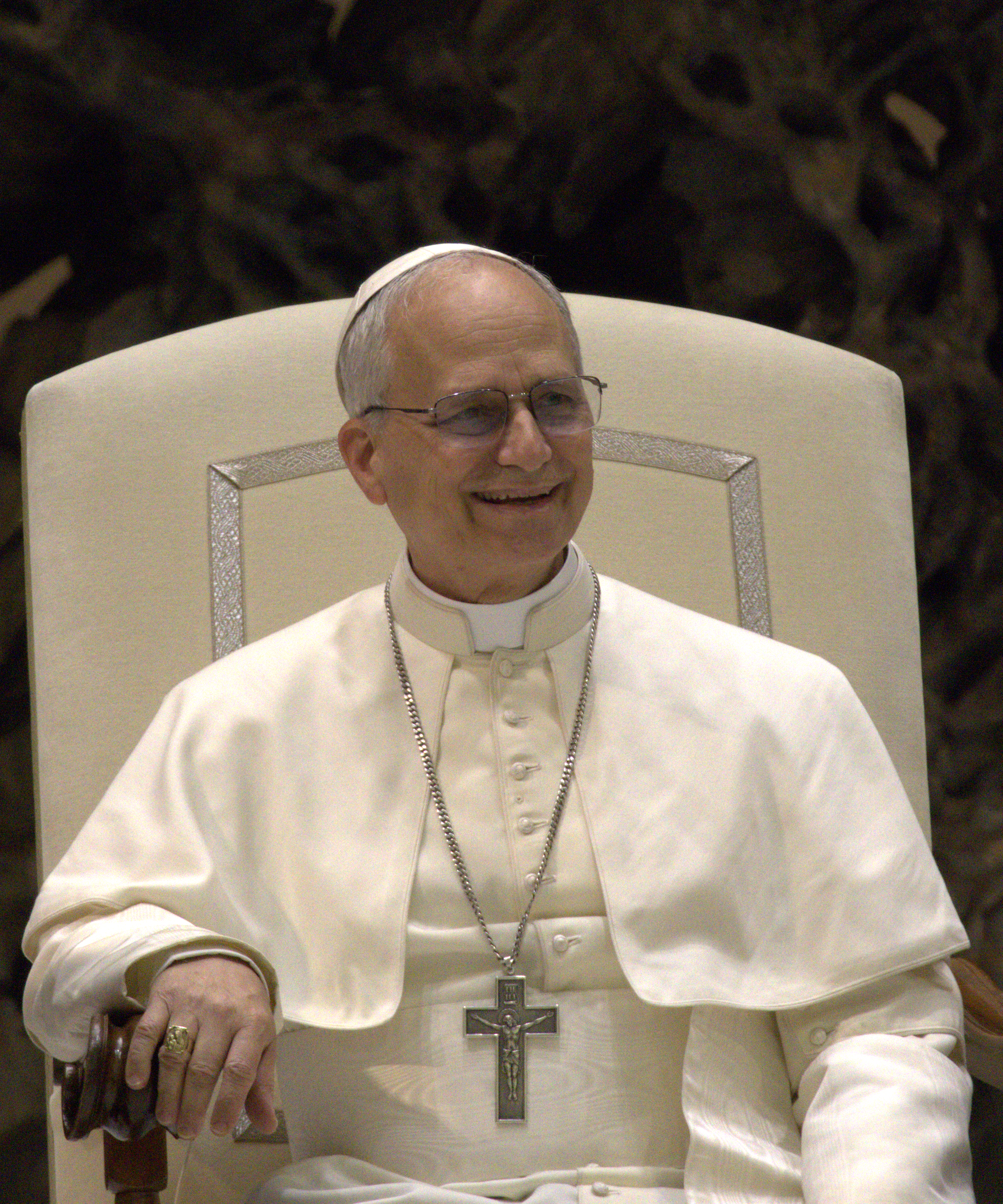
Pope Leo XIV

- July 1 – Lisa Scottoline, writer of legal thrillers
- July 2 – Stephen Walt, political scientist
- July 9 – Lindsey Graham, U.S. Senator from South Carolina from 2003 (d. 2026)
- July 18 – Nancy Garrido, kidnapper
- July 21 – Howie Epstein, bass player, songwriter and producer (Tom Petty and the Heartbreakers) (d. 2003)
- July 22 – Willem Dafoe, actor
- July 24 – F. Blair Wimbush, retired American railroad executive and lawyer
- July 26
  - Jim Avila, television journalist (d. 2025)
  - Michele Pillar, Christian music singer
- August 2
  - Caleb Carr, novelist and military historian (d. 2024)
  - Phase 2 (Lonny Wood), graffiti artist (d. 2019)
  - Butch Vig, record producer and drummer (Garbage)
- August 4
  - Alberto Gonzales, 80th United States Attorney General
  - Billy Bob Thornton, film actor, director, screenwriter, producer and singer-songwriter
- August 13 – Daryl, magician (d. 2017)
- August 24 – Mike Huckabee, Governor of Arkansas
- August 29 – Jack Lew, 76th United States Secretary of the Treasury
- August 30 – Marvin Powell, American football player (d. 2017)
- August 31 – Edwin Moses, track & field athlete
- September 1 – Billy Blanks, martial artist and inventor of Tae Bo exercise program
- September 8 – Terry Tempest Williams, writer, educator and activist
- September 14 – Pope Leo XIV
- September 17 – Charles Martinet, actor and voice actor
- September 19
  - Rebecca Blank, economist and academic administrator (d. 2023)
  - Rex Smith, actor and singer
- September 29
  - Joe Donnelly, U.S. Senator from Indiana from 2013 to 2019
  - Gwen Ifill, journalist and author (d. 2016)
- October 15 – Emily Yoffe, journalist and advice columnist
- October 17 – Tyrone Mitchell, murderer (suicide 1984)
- October 20
  - Thomas Newman, film composer
  - Sheldon Whitehouse, U.S. Senator from Rhode Island from 2007
- October 21 – Tommy Boggs, baseball player (d. 2022)
- October 26 – Michelle Boisseau, poet (d. 2017)
- October 28
  - Ronnie Bass, American football player and sportscaster
  - Bill Gates, software designer and entrepreneur
- October 30 – Heidi Heitkamp, U.S. Senator from North Dakota from 2013 to 2019
- November 4 – David Julius, physiologist, recipient of the Nobel Prize in Physiology or Medicine
- November 5 – Kris Jenner, television personality
- November 6
  - Maria Shriver, journalist and Arnold Schwarzenegger's former wife from 1986 to 2021.
  - Paul Romer, economist, recipient of the Nobel Memorial Prize in Economic Sciences
- November 13
  - Roy Cooper, rodeo cowboy (d. 2025)
  - Whoopi Goldberg, comic actress
- November 23
  - Steven Brust, fantasy author and musician
  - Peter Douglas, television and film producer
  - Mary Landrieu, U.S. Senator from Louisiana from 1997 to 2015
- November 27 – Bill Nye, science communicator, television presenter and mechanical engineer
- November 29 – Robert Jeffress, pastor
- November 30
  - Richard Burr, U.S. Senator from North Carolina from 2005 to 2023
  - Kevin Conroy, stage, screen and voice actor (d. 2022)
- December 11
  - Gene Grossman, economist and academic
  - Stu Jackson, basketball player, coach and manager
- December 16 – Carol Browner, lawyer, environmentalist and businesswoman
- December 19 – Rob Portman, U.S. Senator from Ohio from 2011 to 2023
- December 21 – Jane Kaczmarek, television actress
- December 26 – Evan Bayh, U.S. Senator from Indiana from 1999 to 2011
- December 27 – Barbara Olson, lawyer and TV commentator (d. 2001)

=== Unknown dates ===
- Mark Marderosian, cartoonist

== Deaths ==
=== January ===
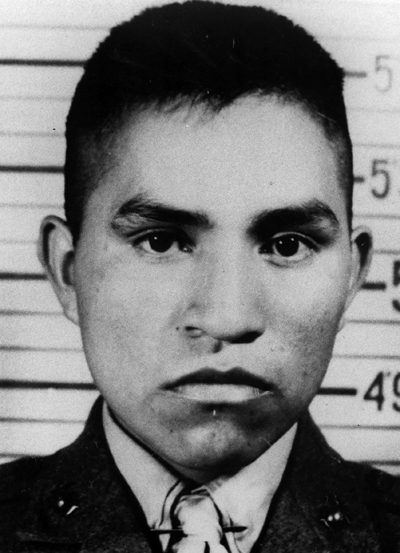
Ira Hayes

- January 1 – Arthur C. Parker, part-Seneca archeologist and ethnographer of Native Americans (b. 1881)
- January 20 – Robert P. Tristram Coffin, poet, essayist and novelist (b. 1892)
- January 21 – Archie Hahn, sprinter (b. 1880)
- January 24 – Ira Hayes, Native American U.S. Marine flag raiser on Iwo Jima (b. 1923)
- January 31 – John Mott, YMCA leader, recipient of the Nobel Peace Prize (b. 1865)

=== February ===
- February 11 – Ona Munson, actress (b. 1903)
- February 12
  - Tom Moore, Irish-American film actor (b. 1883)
  - S. Z. Sakall, Hungarian-American actor (b. 1883)
- February 20
  - Oswald Avery, physician and medical researcher (b. 1877)
  - Rajarsi Janakananda, millionaire and disciple of Paramahansa Yogananda (b. 1892)
- February 22 – John T. Walker, Marine Corps lieutenant general (b. 1893)
- February 27 – Trixie Friganza, actress (b. 1870)

=== March ===
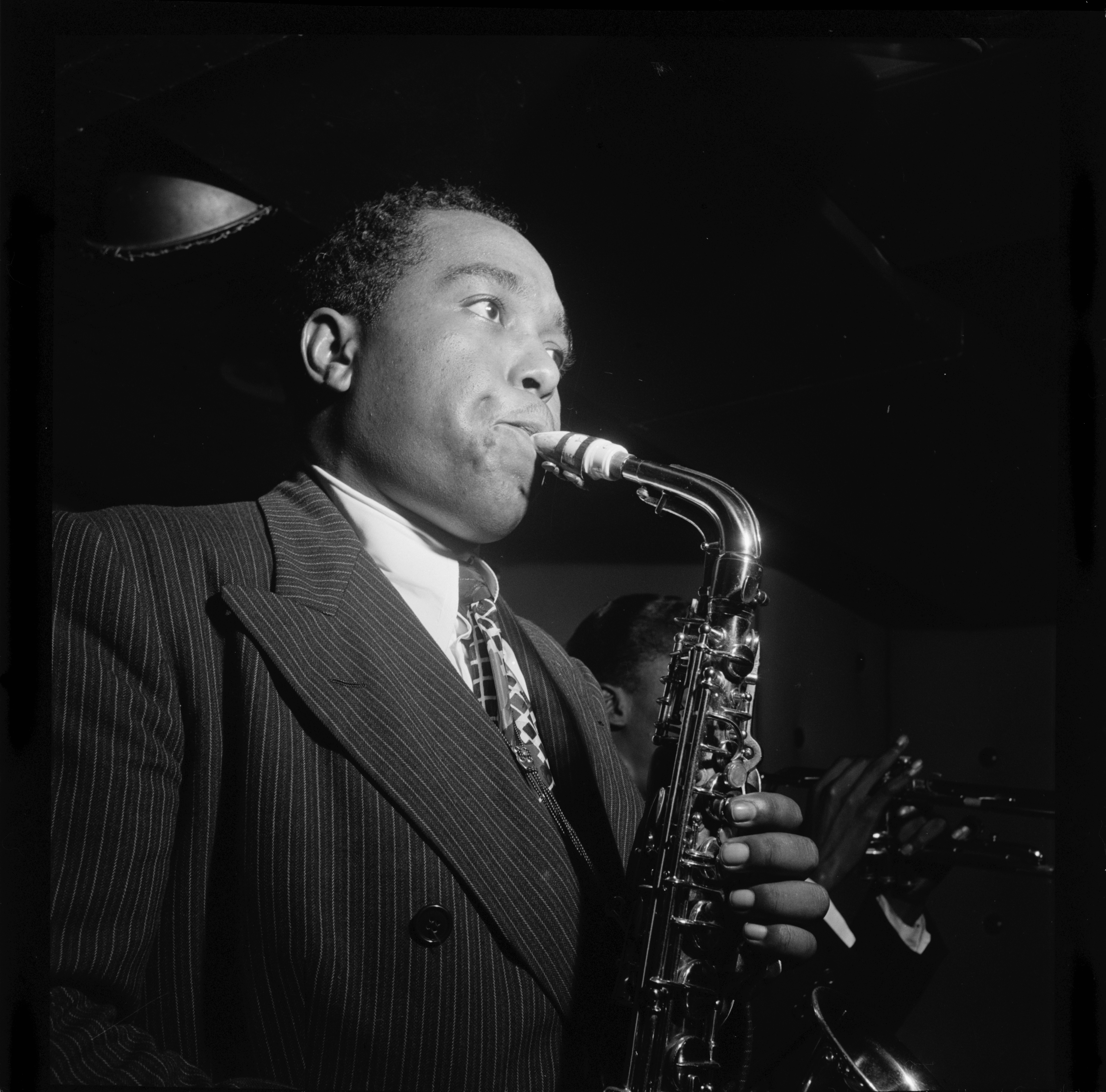
Charlie Parker

- March 3 – Katharine Drexel, Roman Catholic saint (b. 1858)
- March 5 – William C. deMille, screenwriter and film director (b. 1878)
- March 9 – Matthew Henson, African-American explorer (b. 1866)
- March 11 – Oscar F. Mayer, German-American entrepreneur (b. 1859)
- March 12 – Charlie Parker, African-American jazz saxophonist (b. 1920)
- March 21 – Walter White, civil rights activist (b. 1893)
- March 24 – John W. Davis, politician and presidential candidate (b. 1873)

=== April ===
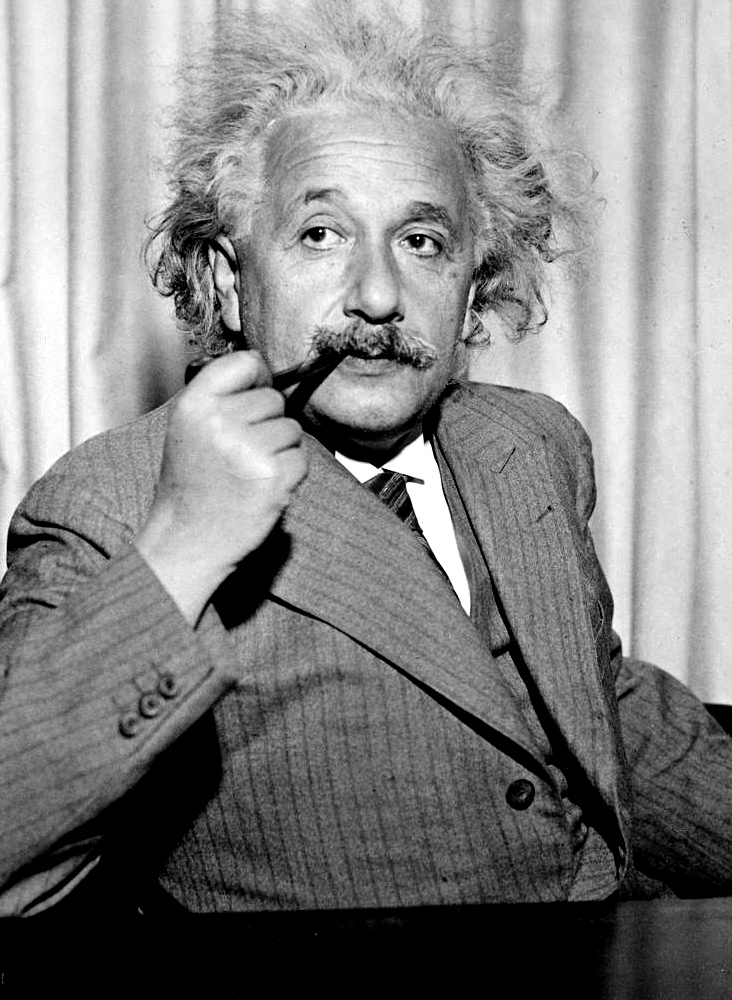
Albert Einstein

- April 1 – Robert R. McCormick, newspaper publisher (Chicago Tribune) (b. 1880)
- April 7 – Theda Bara, silent film actress (b. 1885)
- April 14 – Cleve Abbott, African-American football player and coach (b. 1894)
- April 15 – Edgar J. Kaufmann, merchant and patron of Fallingwater (b. 1885)
- April 18 – Albert Einstein, theoretical physicist, developer of theory of relativity (b. 1879 in Germany)
- April 25 – Constance Collier, English actress and acting coach (b. 1878)

=== May ===
- May 2 – Truman Abbe, surgeon who received awards for his research on radium in medicine (b. 1873)
- May 11
  - Francis Pierlot, actor (b. 1875)
  - Bradley Walker Tomlin, painter (b. 1899)
- May 14 – Charles Pelot Summerall, general (b. 1867)
- May 16 – James Agee, writer (b. 1909)
- May 18 – Mary McLeod Bethune, educator (b. 1875)
- May 22 – Richard "Skeets" Gallagher, actor (b. 1891)
- May 25 – Wardell Gray, jazz tenor saxophonist (b. 1921)
- May 30 – Bill Vukovich, race-car driver (b. 1918)

=== June ===
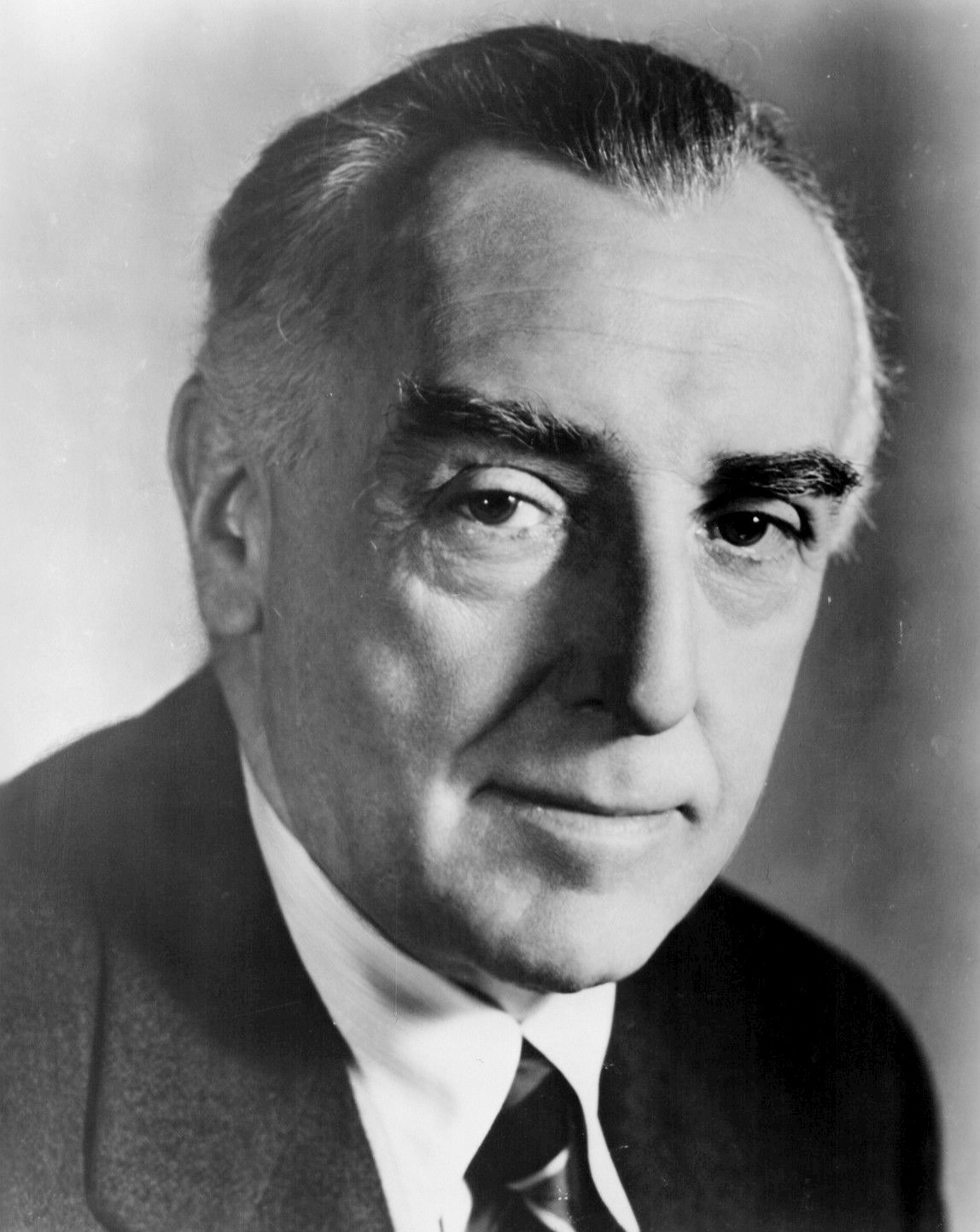
Walter Hampden

- June 5 – Pattillo Higgins, oil pioneer and businessman (b. 1863)
- June 10 – Margaret Abbott, golfer, first American woman to take first place in the Olympics (b. 1876)
- June 11 – Walter Hampden, film actor (b. 1879)
- June 13 – Nora Trueblood Gause, humanitarian (b. 1851)
- June 17 – Carlyle Blackwell, actor (b. 1884)

=== July ===
- July 10 – Frank Hamer, lawman and ranger (b. 1884)
- July 13 – Stanley Price, film and television actor (b. 1892)
- July 23 – Cordell Hull, United States Secretary of State, recipient of the Nobel Peace Prize (b. 1871)
- July 31 – Robert Francis, actor (b. 1930)

=== August ===
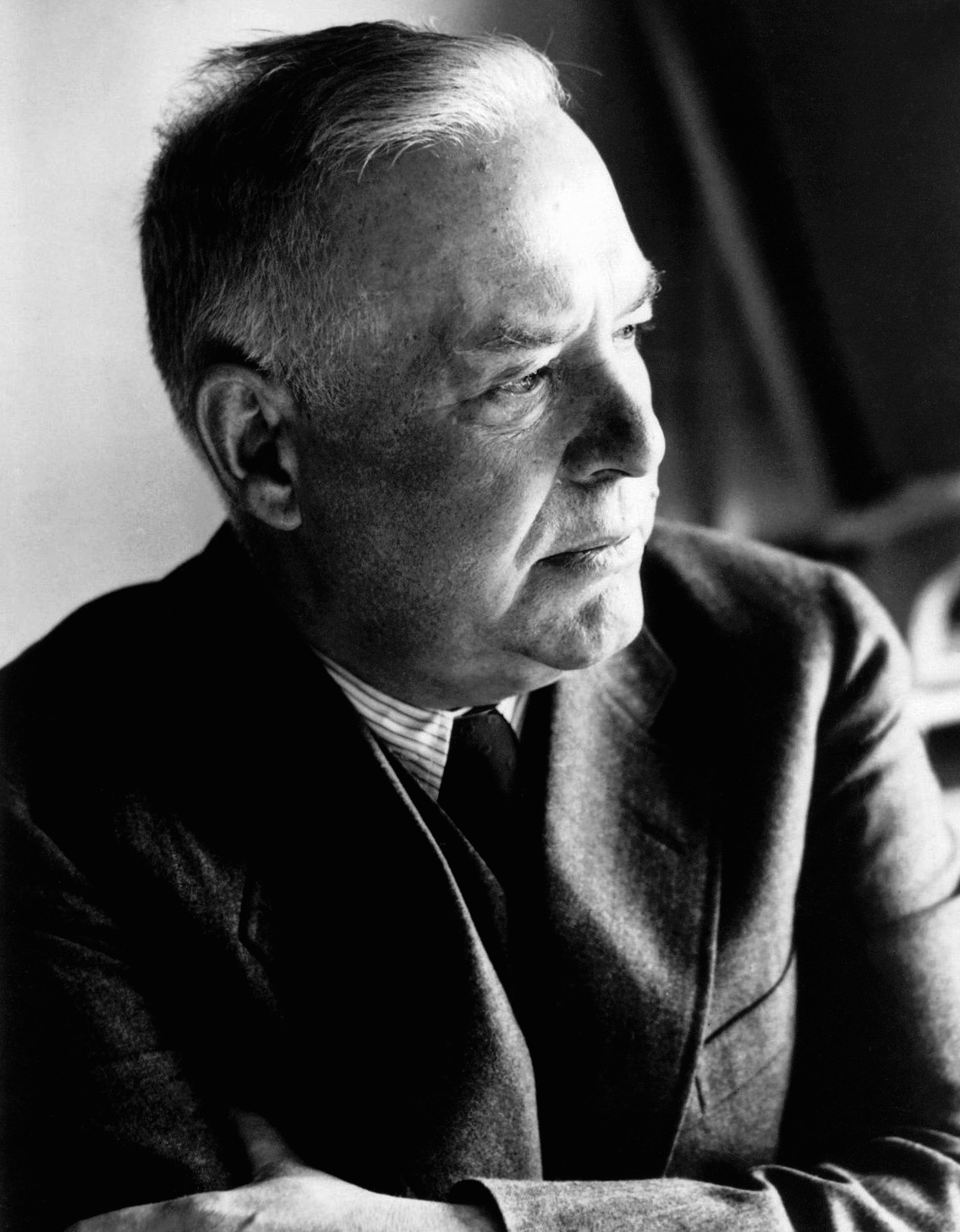
Wallace Stevens

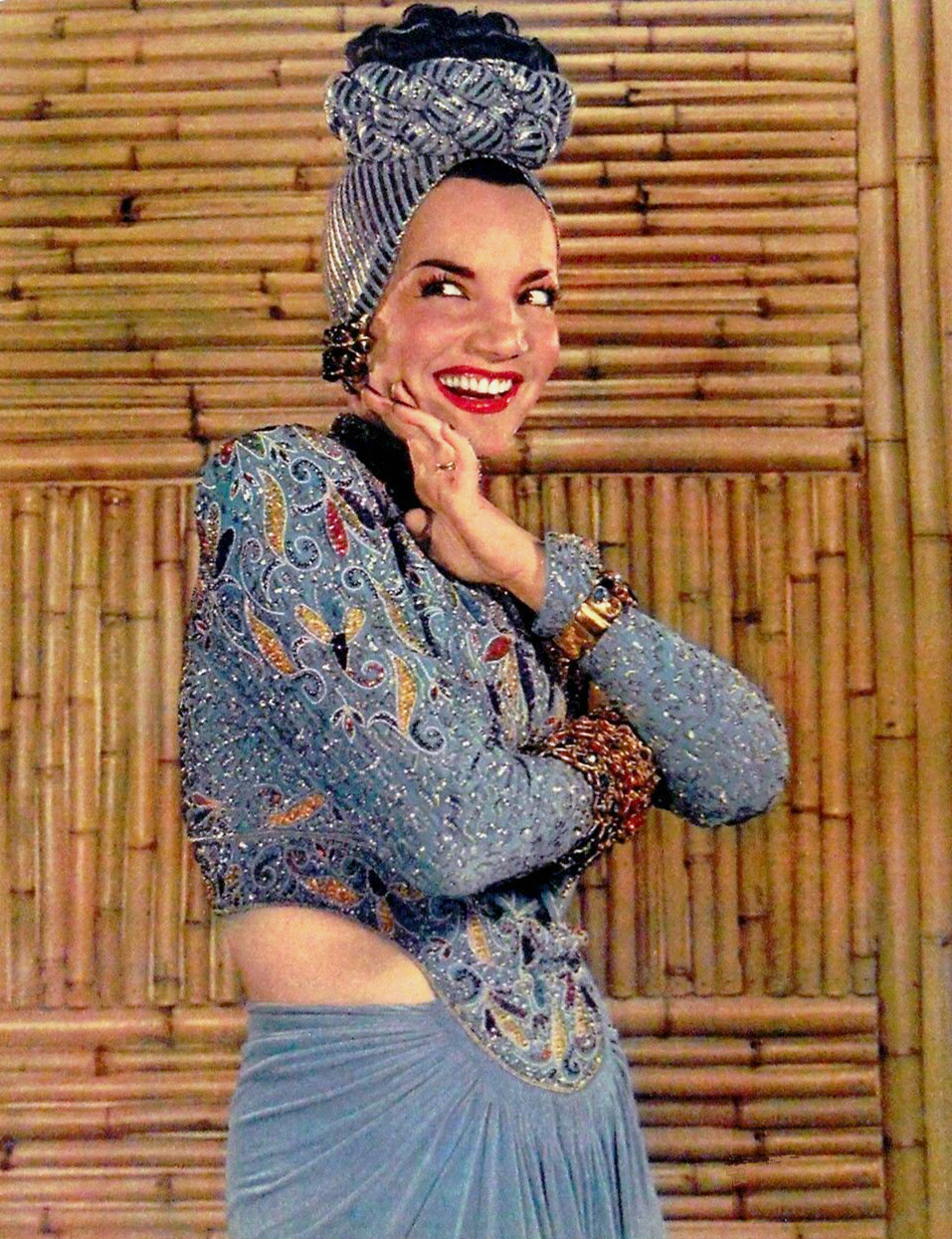
Carmen Miranda

- August 2 – Wallace Stevens, poet (b. 1879)
- August 5 – Carmen Miranda, Portuguese-born Brazilian singer and actress (b. 1909)
- August 8 – Grace Hartman, actress (b. 1907)
- August 11
  - Frank Seiberling, innovator and entrepreneur (b. 1859)
  - Robert W. Wood, optical physicist (b. 1868)
- August 12 – James B. Sumner, chemist, Nobel Prize laureate (b. 1887)
- August 14 – Herbert Putnam, Librarian of Congress (b. 1861)
- August 22 – Olin Downes, music critic (b. 1886)
- August 28
  - Bob Gordon, jazz saxophonist (b. 1928)
  - Emmett Till, murder victim (b. 1941)

=== September ===
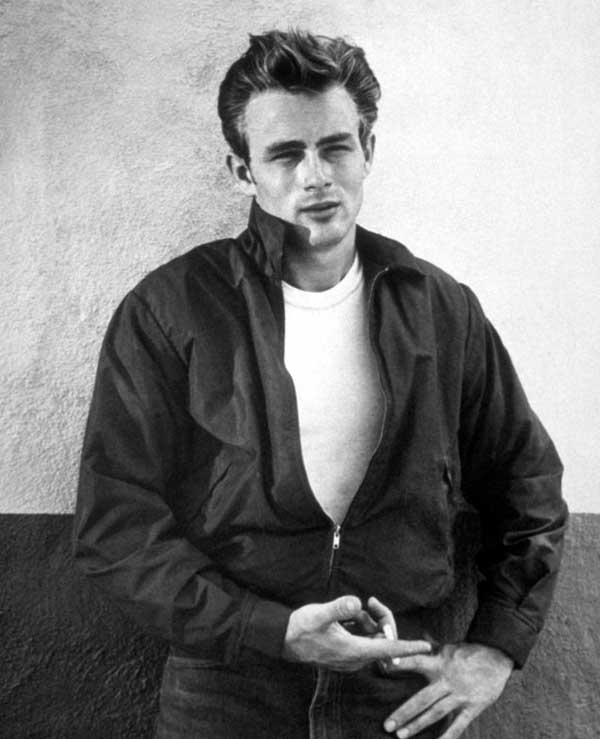
James Dean

- September 1 – Philip Loeb, actor (b. 1891)
- September 2 – Stephen Victor Graham, United States Navy Rear Admiral and 18th Governor of American Samoa (b. 1874)
- September 3 – Georgina Jones, tennis player (b. 1882)
- September 20 – Robert Riskin, screenwriter (b. 1897)
- September 23 – Martha Norelius, Olympic swimmer (b. 1908)
- September 27 – Leslie Garland Bolling, African-American sculptor (b. 1898)
- September 28 – Sarah Blizzard, labor activist (b. 1864)
- September 30
  - Michael Chekhov, Russian actor and film director (b. 1891)
  - James Dean, film actor (b. 1931)
  - Louis Leon Thurstone, pioneer of psychometrics and psychophysics (b. 1887)

=== October ===
- October 1 – Charles Christie, film studio owner (b. 1880)
- October 8 – Iry LeJeune, Cajun musician (b. 1928)
- October 9 – Alice Joyce, actress (b. 1890)
- October 19 – John Hodiak, film actor (b. 1914)
- October 31 – William Woodward Jr., banker and horse breeder, shot in mariticide (b. 1920)

=== November ===
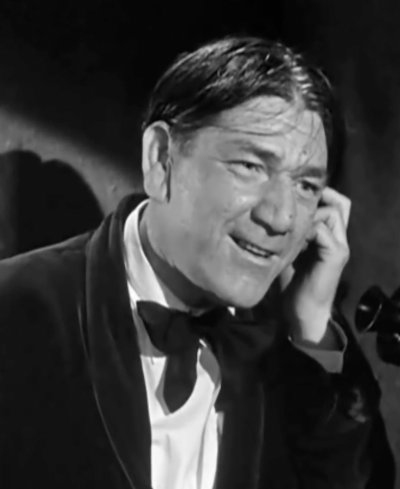
Shemp Howard

- November 1 – Dale Carnegie, writer and lecturer (b. 1888)
- November 4 – Cy Young, baseball player (Cleveland Spiders), member of MLB Hall of Fame (b. 1867)
- November 9 – Tom Powers, actor (b. 1890)
- November 11 – Jerry Ross, lyricist and composer (b. 1926)
- November 14 – Robert E. Sherwood, playwright (b. 1896)
- November 15 – Lloyd Bacon, actor and film director (b. 1889)
- November 17 – James P. Johnson, pianist and composer (b. 1894)
- November 22 – Shemp Howard, film actor and comedian (The Three Stooges) (b. 1895)
- November 29 – Rene Paul Chambellan, sculptor (b. 1893)

=== December ===
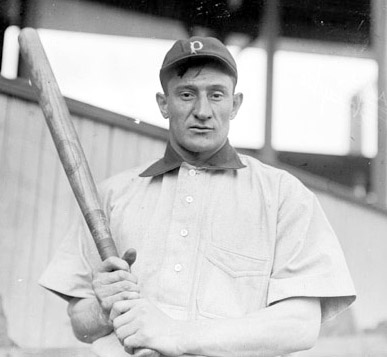
Honus Wagner

- December 1 – Chief Thundercloud, character actor (b. 1899)
- December 5 – Paul Harvey, actor (b. 1882)
- December 6
  - George Platt Lynes, photographer (b. 1907)
  - Honus Wagner, baseball player (Pittsburgh Pirates), member of MLB Hall of Fame (b. 1874)
- December 22 – Otto Eppers, cartoonist (b. 1893)
- December 24 – Nana Bryant, actress (b. 1888)
- December 25
  - Thomas J. Preston Jr., professor of archeology at Princeton University; second husband of Frances Cleveland (widow of President Grover Cleveland) (b. 1862)
  - Elizabeth Harrison Walker, daughter of President Benjamin Harrison and Mary Dimmick Harrison (b. 1897)
- December 27 – Ham Fisher, comic strip writer and cartoonist (b. 1900)

== See also ==
- 1955–56 in American soccer
- List of American films of 1955
- Timeline of United States history (1950–1969)
