= Wimbush =

Wimbush is a surname of English origin. People with that surname include:

- Brandon Wimbush (born 1996), American football player
- Derrick Wimbush (born 1980), American football player
- F. Blair Wimbush (born 1955), American railroad executive, lawyer and civic and professional leader
- Henry B Wimbush (1858–1943), English landscape painter, book illustrator and postcard artist
- John L. Wimbush (1854–1914), English landscape and portrait painter
- Martin Wimbush (born 1949), British actor
- Mary Wimbush (1924–2005), English actress
- Richard Wimbush (1903–1994), British Anglican priest

== See also ==
- Winbush (disambiguation)
