= Diss Town Hall =

Municipal building in Diss, Norfolk, England

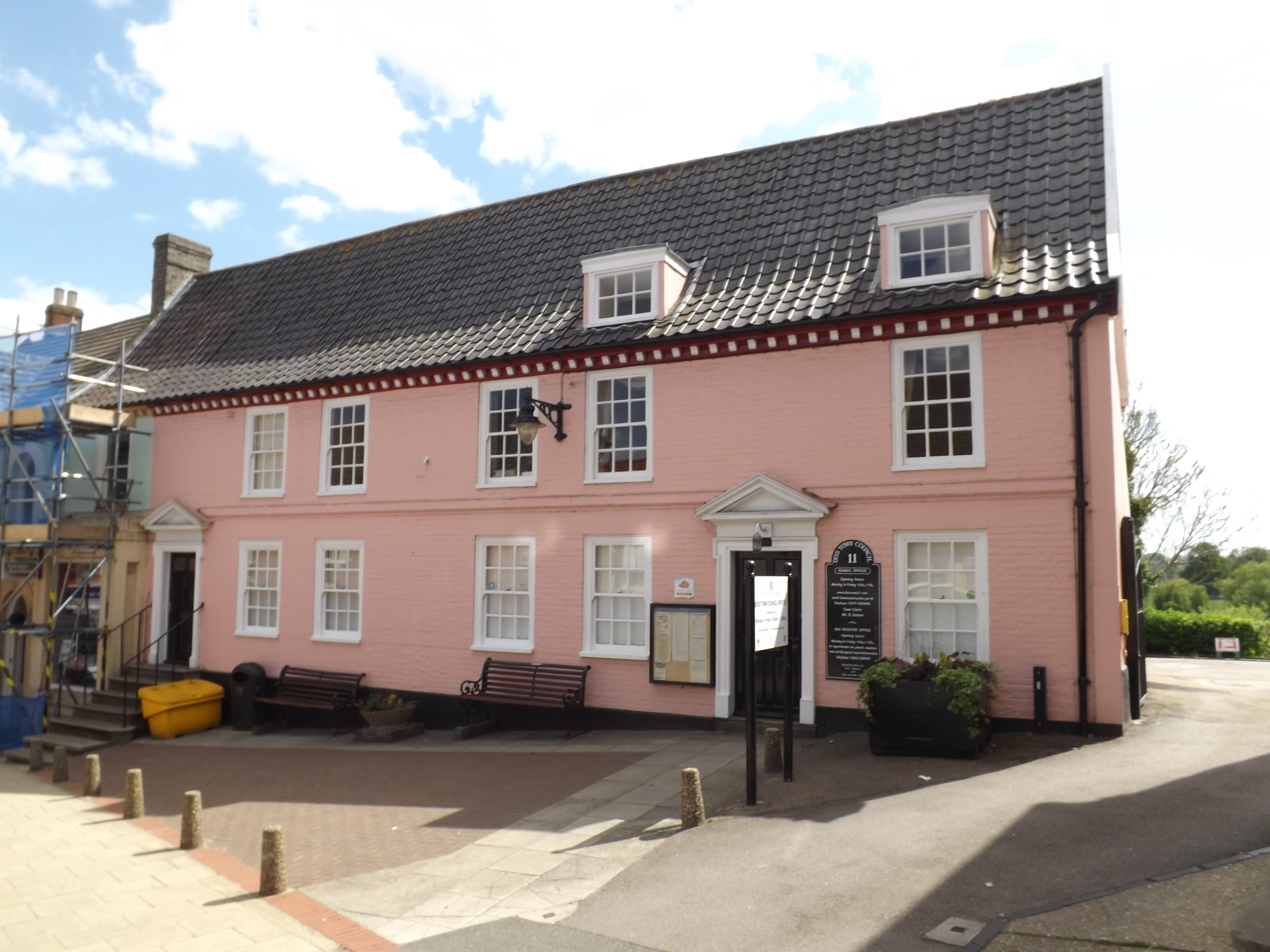
- The building in 2015

- Shown in Norfolk
- 52.3771°N 1.1078°E
- Location: Market Hill, Diss

History
- Built: c.1830 (houses first combined)

Site notes
- Architectural style: Neoclassical style

Listed Building – Grade II
- Official name: 11 and 12, Market Hill
- Designated: 29 December 1950
- Reference no.: 1170035

Diss Town Hall is a municipal building on Market Hill in Diss, Norfolk, a town in England.The building, which currently accommodates the offices of Diss Town Council, is a Grade II listed building.

== History ==
The complex has its origins in two houses constructed in the 18th century. In around 1830 the two were united under the ownership of Thomas Leach, a local manufacturer of worsted and woollens. In about 1850, he redivided the property, and let one of the properties, No. 10, to his son-in-law, John Pennington, who was a wine salesman. After Leach died, probably in the 1870s, ownership passed to Pennington, who continued to live in No. 10, letting the other property, No. 11, to a local school mistress, Susan Dix. In 1887, Pennington sold both houses to a consortium of three property owners, who then let No. 11 to a pharmacist, John Cadge. In 1920, No. 11 was sold to a greengrocer, Albert James Cooper.

After the local rural sanitary authority was succeeded by Diss Urban District Council in 1894, the new civic leaders established their offices at The Terrace in Diss. As the responsibilities of the council increased, it sought larger premises and, in 1938, the council decided to acquire both No. 10 and No. 11 Market Hill to accommodate a dedicated council chamber and municipal offices.

The building continued to serve in that capacity for much of the next four decades, but ceased to be the local seat of government when South Norfolk District Council was formed at Farthing Green House in Loddon in 1974. The building on Market Hill subsequently became the offices of Diss Town Council, although the town council held its meetings at the Corn Hall.

The council chamber continues to be used for public events. In November 2012, a ceremony was held there during which the Royal Anglian Regiment received the Freedom of Diss.

== Architecture ==
The brick building has two storeys and an attic, with a pantiled roof. Each floor has six windows, but the leftmost bay has been incorporated into the neighbouring building. There are two doors, one up stone steps with a wrought iron rail. Each has a doorcase with a pediment. At roof level, there is a modillioned cornice. The right-hand section is fenestrated by two dormer windows at attic level. Internally, the principal room is the council chamber, which features exposed roof trusses and purlins. The building was grade II listed in 1950.
