= William Basham =

William Basham may refer to:

- W. Ralph Basham (born 1943), American government official
- William Richard Basham (1804–1877), English physician
