= Diss, Norfolk =

Town in Norfolk, England

Coordinates: 52.3812°N 1.1079°E

Diss
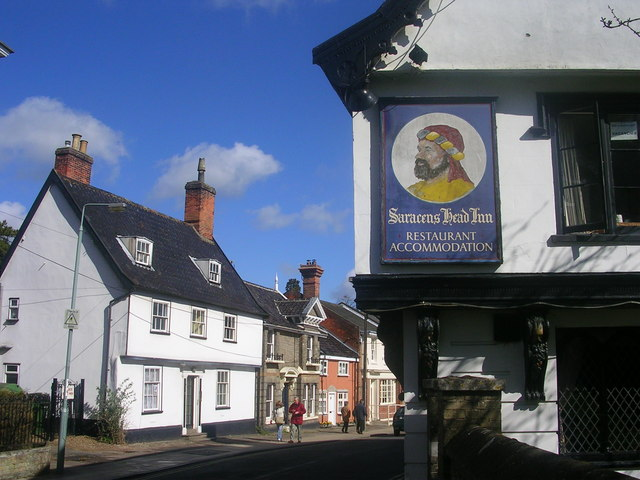
- The Saracen's Head pub

- Coat of arms of Diss Town Council

- Location within Norfolk
- Area: 5.32 km^{2} (2.05 sq mi)
- Population: 10,714 (2021 census)
  - Density: 2,014/km^{2} (5,220/sq mi)
- OS grid reference: TM1180
- Civil parish: Diss
- District: South Norfolk
- Shire county: Norfolk
- Region: East
- Country: England
- Sovereign state: United Kingdom
- Post town: DISS
- Postcode district: IP22
- Dialling code: 01379
- Police: Norfolk
- Fire: Norfolk
- Ambulance: East of England
- UK Parliament: Waveney Valley

Diss is a market town and civil parish in the district of South Norfolk in Norfolk, England. It is near to the boundary with Suffolk. It had a population of 7,572 in 2011. It lies in the valley of the river Waveney, around a mere covering 6 acres (2.4 ha) and up to 18 feet (5.5 m) deep, although there is another 51 feet (16 m) of mud.

== Toponymy ==
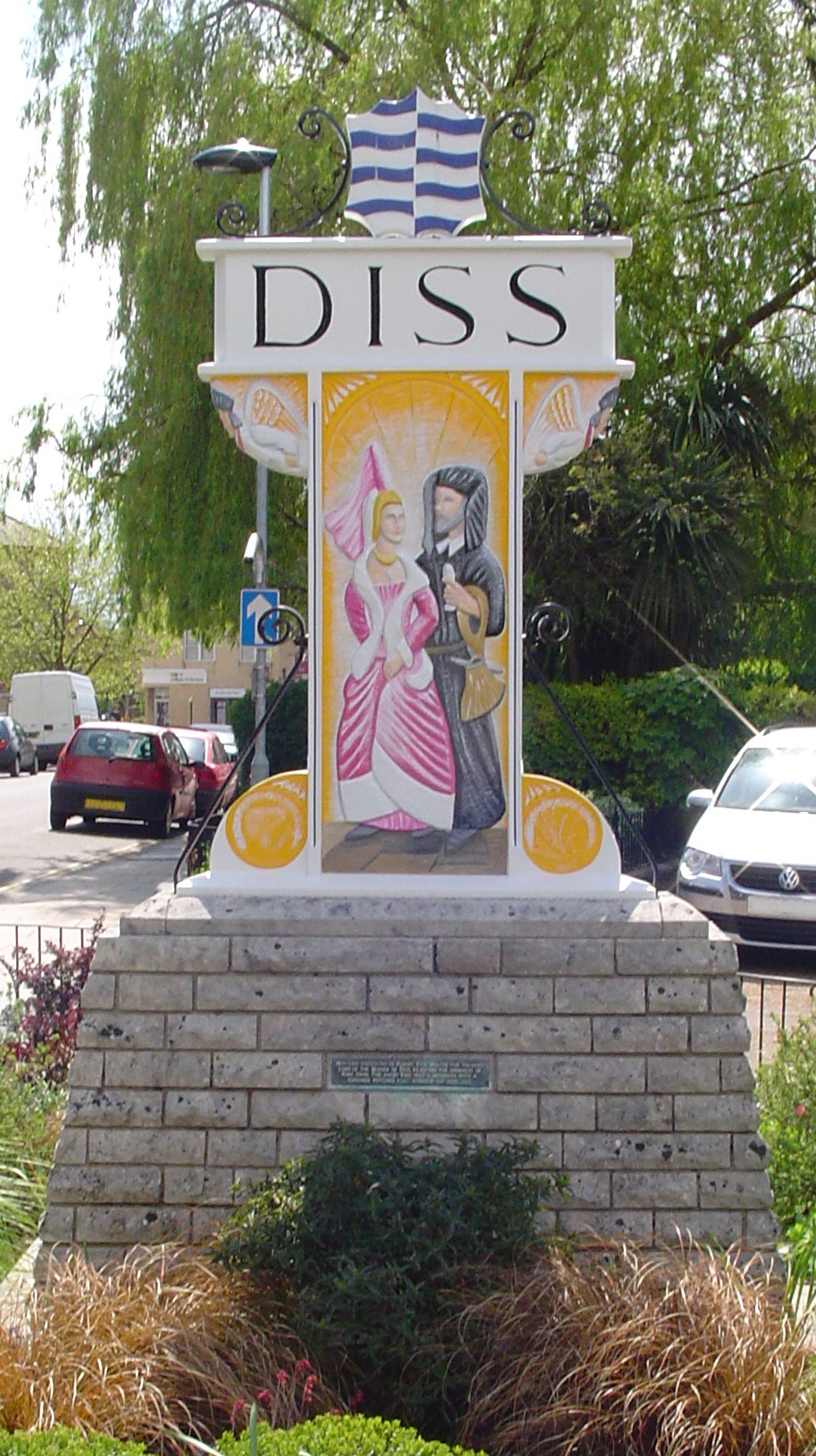
Placename sign

The town's name originates from the Anglo-Saxon word dic (initially pronounced deek, then deetch, and meaning 'ditch' or 'embankment'), which is also the source of the word ditch itself.

== History ==
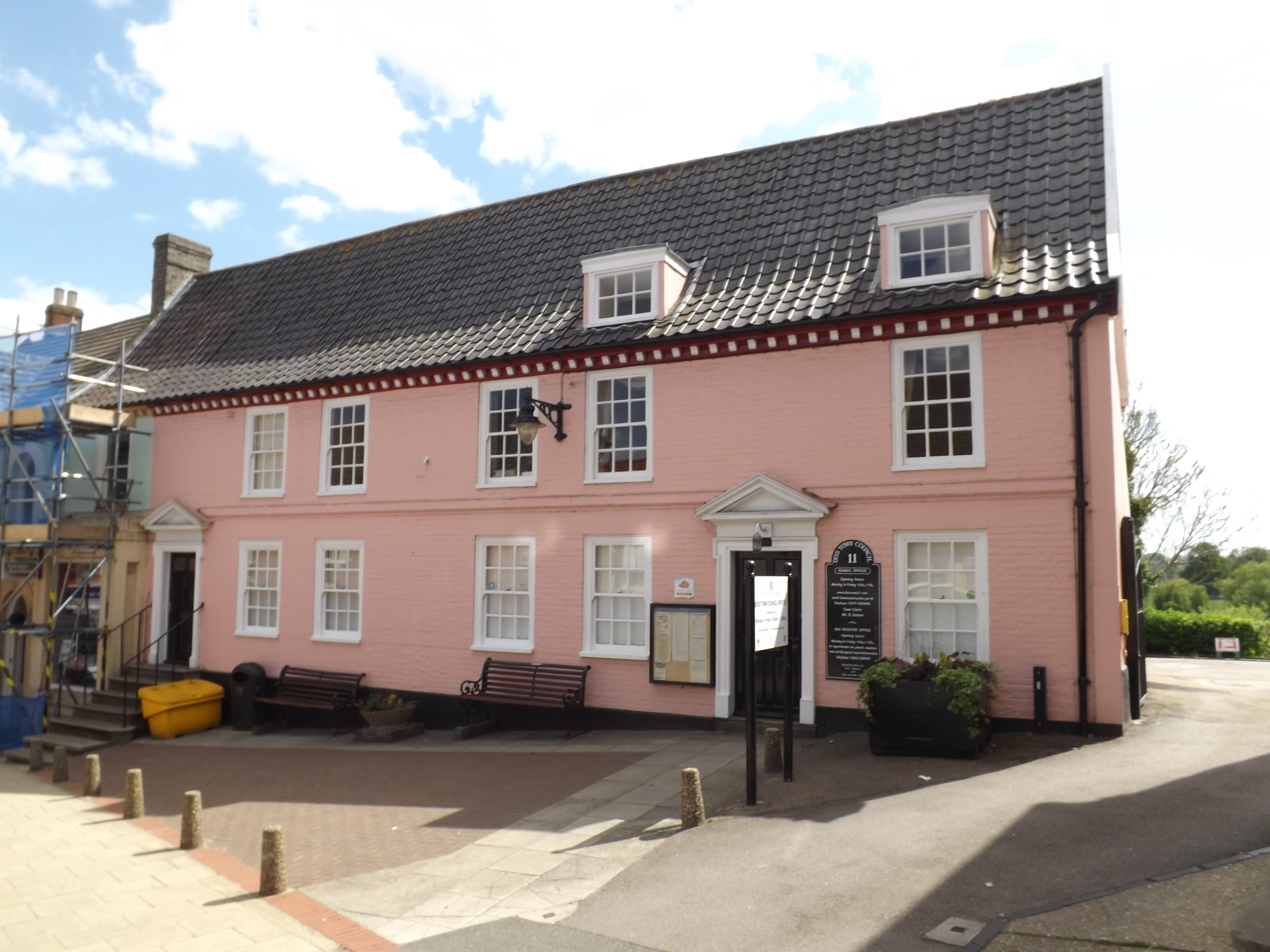
Diss Town Hall

Diss has several historic buildings, including an early 14th-century parish church and an 1850s Corn Hall, which is still in use. Under Edward the Confessor, Diss was part of the Hartismere hundred of Suffolk, It was recorded as such in the Domesday Book of 1086. It is recorded as being in the King's possession as demesne (direct ownership) of the Crown; at that time, there was a church and a glebe of 4 acres (1.6 ha).

This was thought to be worth £15 per annum, which had doubled by the time of William the Conqueror to £30, with the benefit of the whole hundred and half belonging to it. It was then found to be a league long, around 3 miles (4.8 km) and half that distance wide, and paid 4d. in Danegeld. From this it appears that it was still relatively small, but it soon grew, when it subsumed Watlingsete Manor, a neighbouring area as large as Diss, and seemingly more populated according to the geld or tax that it paid. The town includes part of Heywode, as appears from its joining to Burston, into which the manor extended.

Diss was granted by King Henry I to Richard de Lucy, some time before 1135. The Testa de Neville finds it not known whether Diss was rendered to Richard de Lucy as an inheritance or for his service, but adds it was doubtless for the latter. Richard de Lucy became Chief Justiciar to King Stephen and Henry II.

In 1152, Richard de Lucy received the right to hold a market in Diss and, before 1161, he gave a third of a hundred of Diss (Heywood or Hewode) together with the market in frank marriage with his daughter Dionisia to Sir Robert de Mountenay. After Richard de Lucy's death in 1179, the inheritance of the other two parts of Diss hundred passed to his daughter Maud, who married Walter FitzRobert.

The whole estate later fell to the Lordship of the FitzWalters, who were raised to Baron FitzWalter in 1295. In 1299, the then Lord FitzWalter obtained a charter of confirmation for a fair every year at his manor of Diss, to be held around the feast day of Saint Simon and Jude (28 October) and several days after. A grant made in 1298 to William Partekyn of Prilleston (now Billingford) presented for homage and half a mark of silver two homesteads in Diss, with liberty of washing his wool and cloths in Diss Meer. This came on the express condition that the gross dye be washed off first. It seems that Diss church was built by the same Lord, as his arms appear in the stone of the south porch of the church several times.

Soon after the Battle of Agincourt in 1415, Edward Plantagenet, Duke of York and Earl of Rutland, came to hold Diss manor, hundred and market, together with Hemenhale, and the title of Lord FitzWalter became attached to the estate.

It was part of a larger estate that included:

- Hemenhale and Diss manors, with the hundred of Diss in Norfolk
- The manors of Shimpling and Thorne in Suffolk
- The manors of Wodeham-Walter (now Woodham Walter), Henham, Leiden (now part of Leaden Roding), Vitring, Dunmow Parva (now Little Dunmow), Burnham (Note: Possibly the modern village of Burnham-on-Crouch.), Winbush and Shering (now Sheering) in Essex.

Shortly afterwards, the estate was acquired by the Ratcliffe family, which inherited the title of Baron FitzWalter. The family owned the land until at least 1732, styling themselves Viscounts FitzWalter.

John Skelton, tutor and court poet to Henry VIII, was appointed rector at St. Mary's Church in Diss in about 1503. He retained the benefice until his death. Events there formed the subject of some of his poems, such as the humorous invective "Ware the Hauke", in which another priest goes falconing in St Mary's, barring the doors against him and causing chaos in the church.

Opposite the 14th-century parish Church of St Mary the Virgin stands a 16th-century building known as the Dolphin House. This was one of the town's major buildings, as its impressive dressed-oak beams denote. It may have been a wool merchant's house. Formerly a pub, the Dolphin, from the 1800s to the 1960s, the building now houses some small businesses.

Next to Dolphin House is the town's market place, the town's geographical and social centre. The market is held every Friday (except Good Friday and other holidays, when it is rescheduled to Thursday): a variety of local traders sell fresh fruit and vegetables, meat, fish and cheeses. It was first granted a charter by Richard the Lionheart. The town's post office and main shopping street, Mere Street, are also near the marketplace, and Diss Town Hall is located nearby on Market Hill.

Early in 1871, alterations at a house in Mount Street about 100 yards (100 m) north of the parish church led workmen to remove the brick flooring of a ground-floor room and insert the joists of a boarded floor. They found in the centre, some 18 inches (50 cm) from the surface, a hoard of over 300 coins, all silver but for two gold nobles.

From 1927 until 1982, Cambridge businessman Jack Baldry and his son Derek operated a factory in the town that produced soda water, lemonade and cola for the pubs of East Anglia. Baldry also owned soft drinks factories in Cambridge and Sawston The old brewery in Diss that Jack converted into a soda factory is still known locally as Baldry's Yard.

The Diss Museum has been located in a building called the Shambles since 1993.

The 100th Bomb Group Memorial Museum is located 4.5 mi (7.2 km) east of Diss at the former RAF Thorpe Abbotts airfield.

In March 2006, Diss became the third UK town to join Cittaslow, an international body promoting a concept of "Slow Towns". However, it has since withdrawn.

== Climate ==
Climate data for Scole, (Note: The weather station is located 2.0 miles (3.2 km) from Diss town centre.) (1991–2020 normals, extremes 1971–1980)
Month	Jan	Feb	Mar	Apr	May	Jun	Jul	Aug	Sep	Oct	Nov	Dec	Year
Record high °C (°F)	14.2 (57.6)	15.0 (59.0)	19.1 (66.4)	22.9 (73.2)	26.9 (80.4)	34.3 (93.7)	32.1 (89.8)	32.9 (91.2)	29.0 (84.2)	23.7 (74.7)	17.0 (62.6)	15.8 (60.4)	34.3 (93.7)
Mean daily maximum °C (°F)	7.2 (45.0)	8.0 (46.4)	10.8 (51.4)	14.1 (57.4)	17.6 (63.7)	20.8 (69.4)	22.8 (73.0)	22.7 (72.9)	19.7 (67.5)	15.0 (59.0)	10.7 (51.3)	7.8 (46.0)	14.8 (58.6)
Daily mean °C (°F)	4.4 (39.9)	4.8 (40.6)	6.7 (44.1)	9.4 (48.9)	12.7 (54.9)	15.5 (59.9)	17.4 (63.3)	17.4 (63.3)	14.9 (58.8)	11.3 (52.3)	7.4 (45.3)	5.0 (41.0)	10.6 (51.0)
Mean daily minimum °C (°F)	1.5 (34.7)	1.5 (34.7)	2.6 (36.7)	4.7 (40.5)	7.7 (45.9)	10.2 (50.4)	11.9 (53.4)	12.0 (53.6)	10.0 (50.0)	7.5 (45.5)	4.0 (39.2)	2.2 (36.0)	6.3 (43.3)
Record low °C (°F)	−13.3 (8.1)	−12.0 (10.4)	−4.3 (24.3)	−4.3 (24.3)	−1.6 (29.1)	1.7 (35.1)	3.7 (38.7)	4.0 (39.2)	0.8 (33.4)	−1.5 (29.3)	−6.2 (20.8)	−9.7 (14.5)	−13.3 (8.1)
Average precipitation mm (inches)	52.3 (2.06)	44.5 (1.75)	44.6 (1.76)	37.9 (1.49)	38.0 (1.50)	57.1 (2.25)	45.3 (1.78)	58.1 (2.29)	46.1 (1.81)	66.4 (2.61)	78.2 (3.08)	57.8 (2.28)	626.2 (24.65)
Average precipitation days (≥ 1.0 mm)	11.4	8.3	10.5	9.0	8.3	9.0	9.7	8.1	8.5	10.5	11.7	10.5	115.5
Mean monthly sunshine hours	64.4	71.4	118.3	175.0	217.2	207.2	217.5	200.3	162.3	110.8	68.4	62.3	1,675.3
Source 1: Met Office (precipitation days 1981–2010)
Source 2: Starlings Roost Weather

== Transport ==
Diss railway station lies to the east of the town. It is a stop on the Great Eastern Main Line between Norwich and Stowmarket. Greater Anglia operates two trains per hour in each direction to Norwich and to London Liverpool Street, via Ipswich, Colchester and Chelmsford. It is the only station operated by Greater Anglia, and one of the few in the United Kingdom, to serve only inter-city trains.

Bus services are operated primarily by Konectbus and Simonds, both owned by the Transport Made Simple group, which operates out of its East Anglia hub near to the railway station. Routes connect the town with Norwich, Bury St Edmunds, Beccles and Long Stratton.

The town lies on four main roads:

- The A1066 runs through the town; it connects the nearby Scole roundabout with Thetford, via Roydon, Bressingham, South Lopham and Garboldisham
- The A140 also passes via Diss just to the east, providing the town with access to Long Stratton and Norwich to the north, and Stowmarket and Ipswich to the south
- The A143 passes to the south, allowing access to Bury St Edmunds to the west and Harleston, Bungay and then options for Great Yarmouth or Beccles and Lowestoft to the east
- The B1077 road, which links Swaffham and Ipswich, providing links to Watton, Attleborough, Old Buckenham, Winfarthing, Shelfanger, Eye, Occold and Debenham.

== Religion ==
Diss has at least nine places of worship; they include the 13th-century Anglican parish church, the Catholic (St Henry Morse), with Methodist, Baptist and community churches.

== Media ==
Local news and television programmes are provided by BBC East and ITV Anglia. Television signals are received from the Tacolneston TV transmitter.

Local radio stations are BBC Radio Norfolk on 95.1 FM, Heart East on 102.4 FM, Greatest Hits Radio Norfolk & North Suffolk on 99.9 FM and Park Radio, a community radio station that broadcasts on 107.6 FM.

The town's two local newspapers are the Diss Express and the Diss Mercury.

== Sport and recreation ==
The town's sports clubs include Diss Town Football Club and Diss Rugby Club, based in nearby Roydon.

The town has a squadron of Royal Air Force Air Cadets and one of the Army Cadet Force.

== In popular culture ==
A railway journey from London forms the subject of a poem by Sir John Betjeman, "A Mind's Journey to Diss". He also made a short documentary film in 1964, entitled Something about Diss.

== Notable people ==
- John Skelton (c. 1463–1529), poet, is thought to have been born here.
- Thomas Jenkinson Woodward (1745–1820), botanist, died here.
- Thomas Lord (1755–1832), founder of Lord's Cricket Ground, spent childhood here.
- William Richard Basham (1804–1877), medical specialist in dropsy and renal disease, was born here.
- John Goldworth Alger (1836–1907), journalist and writer on the French Revolution, was born here.
- James Bickerton Fisher (1843–1910), solicitor and member of the New Zealand House of Representatives, was born here.
- Catherine Engelhart Amyot (1845–1926), Danish portrait and genre painter, had three children born here (Thomas in 1879, Catherine Florence in 1880 and Noel Ethel in 1882).
- Ethel Le Neve (1883–1967), mistress of the wife-murderer Hawley Harvey Crippen, was born here.
- Elsie Vera Cole (1885–1967), painter and engraver, died here.
- Doreen Wallace (1897–1989), novelist and agricultural writer, taught here in the 1920s and returned for her last eleven years.
- Mary Wilson (1916–2018), centenarian wife of Prime Minister Harold Wilson, was born here.
- Mervyn Cawston (born 1952), professional football goalkeeper, was born here.
- Matthew Upson (born 1979), professional footballer for Arsenal F.C. and England, attended Diss High School.
- Declan Rudd (born 1991), professional football goalkeeper, was born here.
