= William Richard Basham =

English physician

William Richard Basham, M.D. (1804–1877) was an English physician.

== Biography ==
Basham was born at Diss, Norfolk, England. He was at first placed in a banking house, but entered as a student at Westminster Hospital in 1831. In 1833, he went to Edinburgh, and took his M.D. degree in the following year. After this he made a voyage to China, where, in a skirmish on the Canton River, he received a wound in the leg. In 1843, he was appointed physician to the Westminster Hospital, and he devoted himself to the school, giving lectures on medicine until 1871.

== Works ==
He was a specialist in dropsy and renal disease, and wrote on these subjects. The illustrations in his works were from his own pencil. He was the author of:

- On Dropsy Connected With Disease of the Kidneys (morbus Brightii) .... London: J. Churchill, 1858 (3rd ed., 1866).
- Renal Diseases: a clinical guide to their diagnosis and treatment. London: J. Churchill, 1870.
- Aids to the Diagnosis of Diseases of the Kidney. London: J. & A. Churchill, 1872.
