= Connie Cato =

American singer-songwriter

- Born: March 30, 1955 (age 69)
- Origin: St. Louis, Missouri, U.S.
- Genres: Country
- Occupation: Singer
- Instrument: Vocals
- Years active: 1973–1980s
- Labels: Capitol

Connie Cato (born March 30, 1955) is a country music singer. Signed to Capitol Records, Cato released three studio albums in the 1970s and several singles including the top twenty hit "Hurt" in 1975. She stopped recording in the early 1980s.

== Discography ==
=== Albums ===
Year	Album	US Country	Label
1974	Super Connie Cato	32	Capitol
1975	Good Hearted Woman	29	Capitol
1977	Whoever Finds This I Love You	—	Capitol

=== Singles ===
Year	Single	Chart Positions		Album
Year	Single	US Country	CAN Country	Album
1973	"How Come You Struck the Match"	—	—	(single only)
1973	"Four on the Floor"	—	—	Super Connie Cato
1973	"Superskirt"	33	—	Super Connie Cato
1974	"Super Kitten"	73	—	Super Connie Cato
1974	"Lincoln Autry"	92	—	Super Connie Cato
1975	"Hurt"	14	19	Good Hearted Woman
1975	"Yes"	83	—	Good Hearted Woman
1975	"Who Wants a Slightly Used Woman"	53	—	(single only)
1976	"I Love a Beautiful Guy"	91	—	Whoever Finds This I Love You
1976	"Here Comes That Rainy Day Feeling Again"	80	—	Whoever Finds This I Love You
1976	"I'm Sorry"	76	—	Whoever Finds This I Love You
1977	"Whoever Finds This, I Love You"	—	—	Whoever Finds This I Love You
1977	"Don't You Ever Get Tired (Of Hurting Me)"	92	—	Whoever Finds This I Love You
1978	"Yellow House of Love"	—	—	(single only)
1978	"I Won't Take It Lyin' Down"	—	—	(single only)
1980	"Hangin' On My Heart"	—	—	(single only)
1980	"Somebody's Leavin'"	—	—	(single only)
1981	"What About My Heart"	—	—	(single only)
1981	"Roses for Sale'"	—	—	(single only)
