= Winbush =

Winbush is a surname of English origin. People with that surname include:

- Angela Winbush (born 1955), American R&B/soul singer-songwriter
  - Angela Winbush (album), the third studio album by Angela Winbush
- Anthony Winbush (born 1994), American football player
- Camille Winbush (born 1990), American television actress, comedian and recording artist
- Harry Winbush (1903–1990), Australian architect
- Nelson W. Winbush (born 1929), American educator
- Raymond Winbush (born 1948), American scholar

== See also ==
- Wimbush (disambiguation)
