= Corn Hall, Diss =

Commercial building in Diss, Norfolk, England

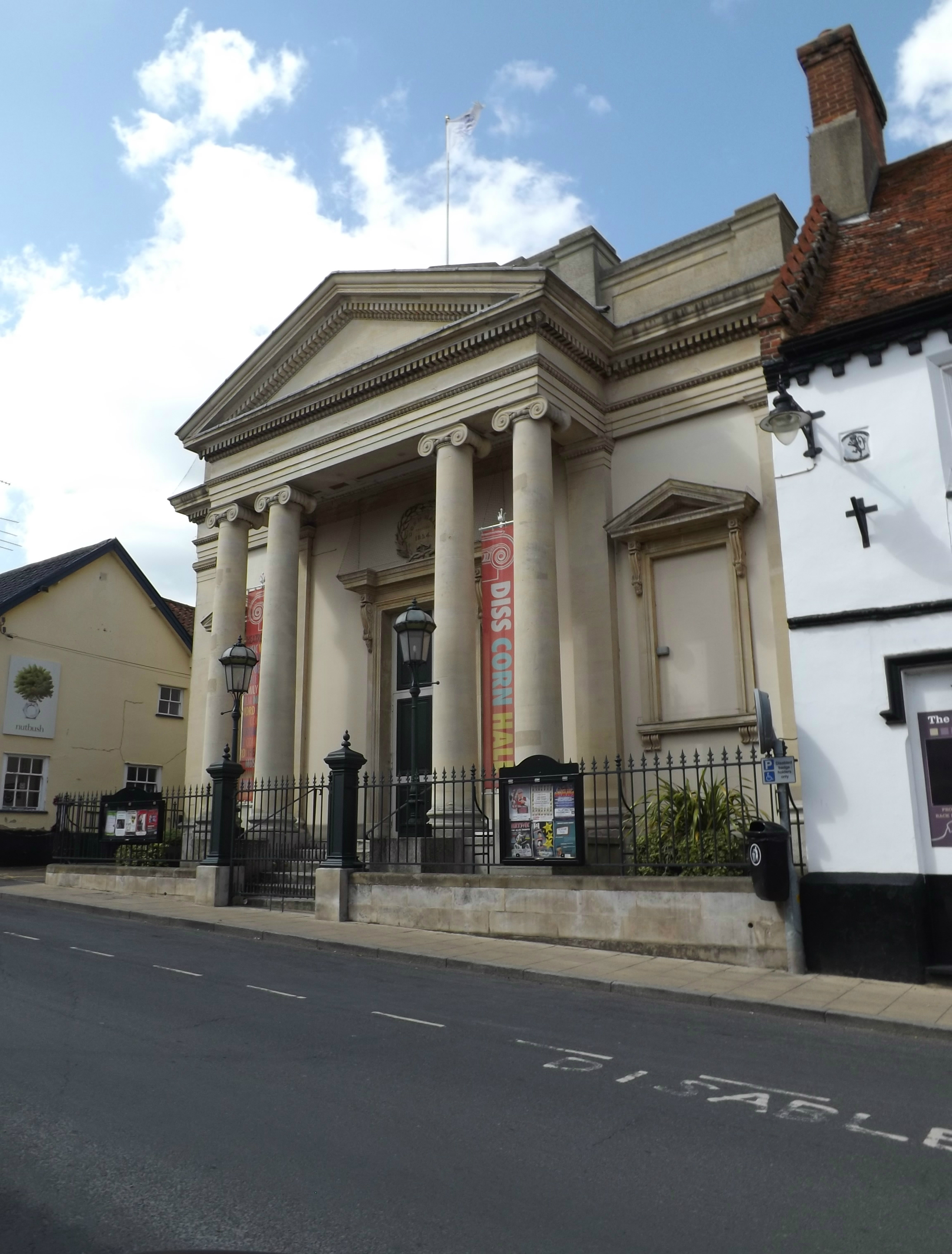
- Corn Hall, Diss

- Shown in Norfolk
- 52.3776°N 1.1072°E
- Location: St Nicholas Street, Diss

History
- Built: 1854

Site notes
- Architect: George Atkins
- Architectural style: Neoclassical style

Listed Building – Grade II
- Official name: Corn Hall
- Designated: 8 June 1972
- Reference no.: 1083969

The Corn Hall is a commercial building in St Nicholas Street, Diss, Norfolk, England. The structure, which is now used as an arts centre, is a Grade II listed building.

== History ==
The building was commissioned by the lord of the manor, Thomas Lombe Taylor, whose seat was at Starston Place in Starston. He selected a site on the north side of St Nicholas Street. It was designed by a local architect, George Atkins, in the neoclassical style, built in ashlar stone at a cost of £10,000 and was completed in 1854.

The design featured a symmetrical main frontage of three bays facing St Nicholas Street. The central bay featured a tetrastyle portico formed by four Ionic order columns supporting a modillioned pediment. Behind the portico, a doorway with an architrave and brackets supported a cornice. The outer bays were decorated by blind windows with window sills and brackets supporting pediments. Internally, the principal rooms were the main hall, which was 77 feet (23 m) long and 42 feet (13 m) wide, and a library containing between 2,000 and 3,000 volumes. The official opening was celebrated by a concert performed by an orchestra of between 80 and 90 local people, with all the money raised being donated to the Patriotic Fund.

The architectural historian, Nikolaus Pevsner, was impressed by the design, remarking on the "remarkably civilised facade" and commenting that "the effect...[of this]...is striking". Shortly after it opened, the building also became the venue for the local petty sessions. The use of the building as a corn exchange declined significantly in the wake of the Great Depression of British Agriculture in the late 19th century. Instead, it became a community events venue hosting dances, whist drives and bridge drives.

The owners of the building, Diss Town Council, transferred the responsibility for the management of the building to the Diss Corn Hall Trust when the trust was formed in July 2009. An extensive programme of refurbishment project, involving the conversion of the building into an arts centre to a design by Hudson Architects, commenced in January 2016. Following the project's completion, which a cost £1.7 million with financial support from the National Lottery Heritage Fund, the new arts centre was opened by the Mayor Mike Barwell on 5 May 2017.

The building houses a portrait of benefactor Thomas Lombe Taylor, painted by English portrait artist Sir William Boxall.

== See also ==
- Corn exchanges in England
