= Lea Fite =

American politician (1955–2009)

Lea Fite (January 4, 1955 – October 26, 2009) was an Alabama state legislator. Fite was elected as a Democrat to the Alabama House of Representatives in 2002. He attended Jacksonville State University and was a supermarket owner. Fite died of a seizure on October 26, 2009.

Lea Fite was instrumental in passing legislation in the Alabama House of Representatives to close a loophole denying coverage to victims of breast and cervical cancer.

Fite was known for bridging the gap between Republicans and Democrats in the Alabama Legislature.

Fite was a politician reminiscent of better times. He was deeply connected with his constituents, and served the community both in a capacity as a politician and local community member.
