= Kevin Carl Scholz =

American architect

Kevin Carl Scholz (born February 22, 1955) is an American architect, entrepreneur, professor, artist, owner of Scholz and Associates and current Chairman of SMART (formerly Youthnet). He is best known for his architectural work, his best known buildings being the Utah Veteran's Memorial Park, the Corporate Offices of Neways International, and the newest Timpanogos Harley-Davidson dealership. He was a torch bearer for the 2002 Olympic Winter Games held in Salt Lake City, Utah. He also founded Youthnet (now SMART), the organization that originally created the now nationally instituted "Clean Out the Cabinet" campaign.

== Early life ==
Scholz was born on February 22, 1955, to Carl Oswald Scholz, a United States Marine, and Rose Tindal Scholz in Arcata, California. His father, Carl, died in a logging accident when Kevin was only three. He graduated from Ukiah High School. He graduated with a Bachelor of Arts degree from Brigham Young University in Art and Design in 1982. He became a licensed architect in 1985 after working for various firms. He founded his own architectural firm, Scholz and Associates, in 1987.

He married Brooke Bithell of Idaho Falls, Idaho in 1977. They have four children, and they reside in Springville, Utah.

== Career ==
Scholz is mostly known for his local work in Utah County, Utah, USA. The Veteran's Memorial Park in Riverton, Utah, was designed gratis in memory of the local veterans. For his efforts, the Veteran's Committee named and dedicated the Park's chapel to Kevin's father, Carl Scholz, who was a Marine during the Korean war. Scholz also designed the corporate offices of Neways International, located in Springville, Utah. His architectural talent was challenged when he was asked to design the Timpanogos Harley-Davidson dealership in Lindon, Utah, using all recycled materials in accordance with "green" building standards. He is also internationally known for his work on various projects in the Kingdom of Tonga.

Scholz is the current chairman of SMART, formerly Youthnet, an organization geared toward preventing children and teenagers from engaging in high-risk behaviors, such as substance abuse. Youthnet originally started the "Clean Out the Cabinet" campaign that is now a national effort. In recognition of these efforts, Kevin, along with his wife Brooke, were awarded the Beacon of Hope award in 2008. He was also selected to be a torch bearer in the 2002 Winter Olympics held in Salt Lake City, Utah.

For 19 years, Kevin taught in the visual arts department at Brigham Young University in Provo, Utah. He now teaches art and design at Utah Valley University in Orem, Utah, in addition to his architectural work at Scholz and Associates.
