= F. Blair Wimbush =

American railroad executive (born 1955)

- Born: Frederick Blair Wimbush; Halifax County, Virginia, US
- Education: University of Rochester; University of Virginia School of Law
- Occupations: Business Executive; Lawyer; Virginia Port Authority board member
- Spouse: Jane Wimbush

Frederick Blair Wimbush (born 1955), is a retired American railroad executive and lawyer. He continues to be a civic and professional leader. From 1980 to 2004, Wimbush progressed through positions of increasing responsibility in the Norfolk and Western Railway Company and Norfolk Southern Corporation Law Departments, including senior general counsel in 2002. In June 2004, he was elected vice president, real estate of Norfolk Southern Corporation, parent company of Norfolk Southern Railway Company. In November 2007, he became the first, and as of August 11, 2012, the only, executive level Corporate Sustainability Officer in the railroad industry, in addition to his real estate position. He managed several large conservation and energy efficiency projects for the company and has spoken on corporate sustainability at several corporate and educational conferences. He retired from Norfolk Southern Corporation after 35 years of service on May 1, 2015. Wimbush has served on the boards of the Hampton Roads Association of Commercial Real Estate, Hampton Roads Economic Development Alliance, and the Monarch Bank Norfolk City Board. On April 4, 2015, Virginia Governor Terry McAuliffe announced that Wimbush had been appointed to the Virginia Port Authority board. On June 24, 2016, Governor McAuliffe reappointed Wimbush to a full five-year term ending June 30, 2021.

Wimbush has been a leader in several legal and civic organizations. He was named a Fellow of the Virginia Law Foundation in 1998, a Fellow of the American Bar Foundation in 2005, and has been recognized as one of Virginia's Legal Elite by "Virginia Business." He has been president of the Virginia Commission on Women and Minorities in the Legal Profession; president of the Virginia Law Foundation; board membership on the Old Dominion and Virginia Bar Associations; member of the Supreme Court of Virginia Task Force on Gender Bias; member of the Virginia Bar Association Committee on Special Issues of National and State Importance. He is the former alumni council president at University of Virginia School of Law, a University of Virginia School of Law Business Advisory Council member and a member of the University of Virginia Law School Foundation board of trustees.

Wimbush has been active in charitable organizations, including the American Red Cross and Big Brothers Big Sisters of America. He has been president of the Roanoke Museum of Fine Arts; chairman of the board of the Virginia Symphony Orchestra, where he helped steer the orchestra through difficult financial times in 2008 and immediately following years; and a member of the board of trustees of the Virginia Historical Society.

His accomplishments have been recognized through his entries in "Marquis Who's Who" and "Who's Who Among African Americans."

== Early life and education ==
F. Blair Wimbush was born 1955, in Halifax County, Virginia. His parents are Freddie Blair Wimbush and Sue Carol (Lovelace) Wimbush. He graduated from Martinsville High School, Martinsville, Virginia in 1973.

Wimbush received a B.A. in political science from the University of Rochester in 1977, and juris doctor from the University of Virginia School of Law in 1980. He attended the Duke University Fuqua School of Business, Norfolk Southern Management Development Program, in 1996. In 2004, he attended the six-week Advanced Management Program at the Harvard Business School.

In 1981, Wimbush married Jane Seay, an engineering graduate of the University of Virginia who later earned an M.B.A., at Old Dominion University, .

== Legal career ==
After working as an intern in 1979, Blair Wimbush began his railroad career in 1980 as an attorney for Norfolk and Western Railway Company, two years before its consolidation with Southern Railway Company, as subsidiaries of Norfolk Southern Corporation. He progressed through a number of leadership positions in the Norfolk Southern Law Department, including General Counsel – Operations and Senior General Counsel. Among other projects, he helped develop the EPA's Clean Air Act Locomotive Emissions Standards in 1997. His achievements merited inclusion in Virginia's Legal Elite as recognized by "Virginia Business."

== Executive career ==
In June 2004, F. Blair Wimbush Jr. was elected vice president, real estate, of Norfolk Southern Corporation, parent company of Norfolk Southern Railway Company. In November 2007, he became the first, and as of August 11, 2012, the only, executive-level corporate sustainability officer in the railroad industry, in addition to his real estate position. He has managed several large conservation projects for the company while leading the company's efforts to enhance relationships with environmental stakeholders and to measure and minimize the railroad's environmental footprint. His job includes pushing to conserve fuel, increase energy efficiency, reduce carbon emissions, recycle, and promote environmental partnerships.

In 2008, Wimbush assisted with the donation of an environmentally significant conservation easement on 12,500 acres of Norfolk Southern's Brosnan Forest property in the low country of South Carolina. Norfolk Southern donated a conservation easement to the Lowcountry Open Land Trust that will protect the property from development forever. Wimbush said: "We wanted to ensure that we could preserve the long-term health of this irreplaceable natural resource." The easement will protect the natural environment for animals and the ACE Basin watershed. On October 22, 2013, Wimbush announced that Norfolk Southern Corporation and Finite Carbon completed the successful development and registration of the Brosnan Forest Improved Forest Management carbon project. According to the company, the project met the Climate Action Reserve's forest project protocol and resulted in more than 282,000 eligible carbon offset credits at initial registration.

On February 26, 2011, Norfolk Southern announced that its Arnold B. McKinnon headquarters building in Norfolk, Virginia earned the 2010 U.S. Environmental Protection Agency’s Energy Star, the national symbol for protecting the environment through energy efficiency. Commercial buildings that earn the Energy Star use an average of 35 percent less energy than typical buildings and release 35 percent less carbon dioxide into the atmosphere. Wimbush stated: "Norfolk Southern is committed to increasing energy efficiency in all its buildings and facilities and incorporating sustainable designs and materials in new construction projects."

On February 17, 2012, Norfolk Southern Corporation announced that it had earned the top ranking among railroads in the S&P 500 Clean Capitalism Ranking published by Corporate Knights, a media, research, and financial products company that focuses on clean capitalism. Wimbush, said "It reflects our commitment to proactive management of sustainability issues and strong stakeholder communication." The company ranked 66 out of the 500 S&P companies.

Wimbush also led Norfolk Southern's participation in the GreenTrees (a privately managed reforestation and carbon sequestration program) initiative: Trees and Trains. By June 2011, Norfolk Southern and GreenTrees announced a conservation agreement that committed Norfolk Southern to planting 6 million trees across 10,000 Mississippi Delta acres. Trees were planted on 1,400 acres by the end of 2011. Wimbush said that reforestation was a key component in Norfolk Southern's approach to reducing the railroad's impact on the environment. Largely as a result of this initiative, on April 17, 2012, Norfolk Southern announced that The American Carbon Registry gave Norfolk Southern its Corporate Excellence award for making a public commitment to reducing CO_{2} emissions 10 percent below 2009 levels by 2014 and for reaching nearly 40 percent of that five-year goal in the first year. By the end of the project's third year, nearly 70 percent of the planned 6.04 million native cottonwood and hardwood trees in an ecologically important region had been planted.

Wimbush has spoken on corporate sustainability at several corporate and educational conferences, including the 2012 Georgia Foreign Trade Conference, at his alma mater, the University of Rochester, on March 28, 2012, the 2011 Green Supply Chain Forum at The Ryder Center for Supply Chain Management of Florida International University, the 22nd Annual Environment Virginia Symposium at Virginia Military Institute on April 7, 2011, and the 2009 Railroad Environmental Conference, October 27–29, 2009 at the University of Illinois Railroad Engineering Program. He is the scheduled speaker for the Virginia Commonwealth University Energy and Sustainability Conference January 30–31, 2013. On September 2–4, 2014, Norfolk Southern, BNSF Railway, and GE Transportation hosted 3-day discussion with industry leaders to address sustainability in the rail industry. Wimbush said: "Norfolk Southern is proud to continue its journey to fully integrate sustainability into all aspects of its business and operations, and looks forward to gaining keen insights from the best practices of industry and NGO participants at this symposium."

In May 2012, he was serving on the boards of the Hampton Roads Association of Commercial Real Estate, Hampton Roads Economic Development Alliance, and the Monarch Bank Norfolk City Board. As of the 2014 annual report, he continued to serve on the board of the Hampton Roads Economic Development Alliance. As of May 2015, he continued to serve on the Monarch Bank Norfolk City Board.

On August 21, 2013, Wimbush announced that Norfolk Southern's Birmingham Regional intermodal facility at McCalla, Alabama, received Leadership in Energy and Environmental Design (LEED) certification. After proposing several "green" upgrades to an expansion of a rail yard in the Englewood neighborhood on the south side of Chicago, Wimbush helped Norfolk Southern secure a zoning change to allow expansion of the rail yard. Norfolk Southern also donated the 59th Street rail line to the city for a park development. The expansion was expected to add 400 jobs in a low income neighborhood, according to a September 2013 report.

With respect to its sustainability efforts, Norfolk Southern was recognized in the Carbon Disclosure Project's S&P 500 Climate Disclosure Leadership Index for 2014. Wimbush said: "We choose to disclose the railroad's carbon performance through CDP to be transparent and accountable to investors, customers, and communities in how we manage and attempt to mitigate environmental impacts of our operations. We are working hard to get even better."

One of the last projects Wimbush participated in before his retirement was showcased on March 27, 2015, when Norfolk Southern CEO C. Wick Moorman announced the start of a $53-million energy conversion project at its Juniata Locomotive Shop that will substantially reduce carbon emissions and water usage at the facility. The project includes replacement of the shop's coal boilers with natural gas heaters, installation of a 1.2-megawatt capacity combined heat and power generator that will produce enough electricity to sustain the entire 16-building complex, adding insulation, energy-efficient windows at key locations, high-speed roll-up doors on locomotive bays, and replacing roofing.

Wimbush retired May 1, 2015, after 35 years with Norfolk Southern. He was credited with leading the company's successful efforts to adopt an enterprise-wide, results-driven approach to moderating its impact on the environment. Norfolk Southern CEO C. Wick Moorman stated "Blair’s contributions are reflected both in the personal environmental efforts our people make every day, as well as in our broad-based achievements that range from meaningful reductions in fuel and energy consumption to our 'Trees to Trains' program for reforesting a large part of the Mississippi Alluvial Valley. He retires with our gratitude for a much cleaner, much greener, and far more environmentally-conscious railroad."

== Civic and professional leadership ==
Blair Wimbush has been a leader in several legal and civic organizations. He was named a Fellow of the Virginia Law Foundation in 1998 and a Fellow of the American Bar Foundation in 2005. He has been recognized as one of Virginia's Legal Elite for Civil Litigation by "Virginia Business." He is a member of the Virginia State Bar and the American Bar Association, National Bar Association, Virginia Bar Association, Old Dominion Bar Association, Twin City Bar Association and Norfolk-Portsmouth Bar Association.

He has been president of the Virginia Commission on Women and Minorities in the Legal Profession; president of the Virginia Law Foundation; board member for the Old Dominion Bar Association and Virginia Bar Association; member of the Supreme Court of Virginia Task Force on Gender Bias; and member of the Virginia Bar Association Committee on Special Issues of National and State Importance. He is a member of the Virginia Bar Association's 125th Summer Meeting Celebration Committee for the event on July 23–26, 2015.

As of August 2012, he is the former alumni council president at University of Virginia School of Law, a University of Virginia School of Law Business Advisory Council member and a member of the University of Virginia Law School Foundation board of trustees. He was a member of the reunion committee for the May 2015 reunion of the University of Virginia School of Law Class of 1980.

Wimbush has been active in charitable organizations, including the American Red Cross and Big Brothers Big Sisters of America.

He has been president of the Roanoke Museum of Fine Arts. In 2005, he became a member of the executive committee of the board of the Virginia Symphony Orchestra and in 2006, he became chairman of the development committee. As chairman of the board of the Virginia Symphony Orchestra, he helped steer the orchestra through difficult financial times in 2008 and immediately following years. Under his leadership, the orchestra secured a loan from the Norfolk Economic Development Authority and avoided bankruptcy. As of May 2015, he continued to serve as a member of the Virginia Symphony Foundation board of directors.

In 2006, he was named a member of the board of trustees of the Virginia Historical Society for a six-year term.

Wimbush serves on the awards selection committee for the Harry F. Byrd Jr. Leadership Award. The award recognizes Virginia high school students exhibiting excellence of character, leadership, devotion to duty, and academic accomplishment.

Wimbush also has been a member of the advisory board of the E. V. Williams Center for Real Estate and Economic Development at Old Dominion University. As of May 2015, he continued to serve on the Williams Center advisory board.

As of May 2015, Wimbush was serving as an executive board member of VIRGINIAforever, which describes its organization as a diverse coalition of businesses, environmental organizations, and outdoor enthusiasts that advocates for increased funding for water quality improvements and land conservation across the Commonwealth.

On April 4, 2015, Virginia governor Terry McAuliffe announced that Wimbush had been appointed to the Virginia Port Authority board, replacing a board member whose term was up on June 30, 2016, and who had resigned. On June 24, 2016, Governor McAuliffe reappointed Wimbush to a full five-year term ending June 30, 2021.

F. Blair Wimbush's accomplishments have resulted in recognition through his entries in "Marquis Who's Who" and "Who's Who Among African Americans."

== See also ==
- Norfolk Southern Corp.
- Norfolk Southern Railway
- Virginia Port Authority
