= English Opera =

English Opera or The English Opera may refer to:

- Opera in English, performed since the 17th century
- The English National Opera, an English opera company founded by Lilian Baylis, originally based at Sadler's Wells Theatre
- The Lyceum Theatre, London, commonly known as "The English Opera" or "The English Opera House" until the 1840s
- The English Opera Company, managed by Louisa Pyne and William Harrison which set up residence in Covent Garden at the Royal Opera House
- The Palace Theatre, London, originally named the Royal English Opera House and intended as a home for English Grand Opera
- English's Opera House, a former theater in Indianapolis, Indiana, United States
