= Greenback Party =

1874–1889 American political party

- Founded: 1874; 152 years ago
- Dissolved: 1889; 137 years ago
- Succeeded by: People's Party ("Populists"); Union Labor Party
- Ideology: Anti-monopolism; Laborism; Monetary reform Agrarianism (initially)
- Political position: Left-wing
- House of Representatives (1878-79): 13 / 293 (peak)

The Greenback Party (known successively as the Independent Party and the Greenback Labor Party) was an American political party with an anti-monopoly ideology which was active from 1874 to 1889. The party ran candidates in three presidential elections, in 1876, 1880 and 1884, before it dissolved.

The party's name referred to the non-gold backed paper money, commonly known as "greenbacks", that had been issued by the North during the American Civil War and shortly afterward. The party opposed the deflationary lowering of prices paid to producers that was entailed by a return to a bullion-based monetary system, the policy favored by the Republican and Democratic parties. Continued use of unbacked currency, it was believed, would better foster business and assist farmers by raising prices and making debts easier to pay.

Initially an agrarian organization associated with the policies of the Grange, the organization took the name Greenback Labor Party in 1878 and attempted to forge a farmer–labor alliance by adding industrial reforms to its agenda, such as support of the 8-hour day and opposition to the use of state or private force to suppress union strikes. The organization faded into obscurity in the second half of the 1880s, with its basic program reborn shortly under the aegis of the People's Party, commonly known as the "Populists". Later, during the early 20th century, parts of the agenda from both parties were accomplished by the Progressives.

== Organizational history ==
=== Background ===
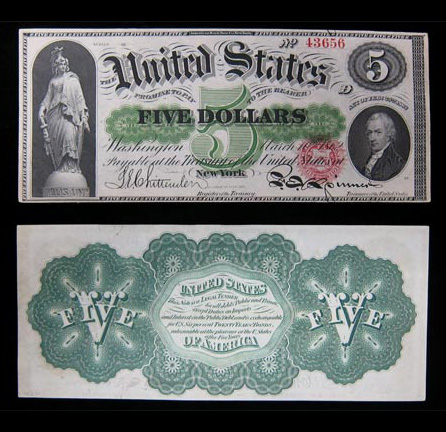
A $5 United States Note of the series of 1862 popularly known as a "greenback" from the color of ink used on the reverse

The American Civil War of 1861 to 1865 greatly affected the financial system of the United States of America, creating vast new war-related expenditures while disrupting the flow of tax revenue from the Southern United States, organized as the Confederate States of America. The act of Southern secession prompted a brief and severe business panic in the North and a crisis of public confidence in the Federal government. The government's initial illusions of a quick military victory proved ephemeral and in the wake of Southern victories the federal government found it increasingly difficult to sell the government bonds necessary to finance the war effort.

Two 1861 bond sales of $50 million each conducted through private banks went without a hitch, but bankers found the market for the 7.3% securities soft for a third bond issue. A general fear arose that the country's gold supply was inadequate and that the nation would soon leave the gold standard. In December runs on deposits began in New York City, forcing banks there to disburse a substantial part of their hard metal reserves. On December 30, 1861, New York banks suspended the redemption of their banknotes with gold. This spontaneous action was followed shortly by banks in other states suspending payment on their own banknotes and the U.S. Treasury itself suspending redemption of its own Treasury notes. The gold standard was thus effectively suspended.

United States Secretary of the Treasury Salmon P. Chase had already anticipated the coming financial crisis, proposing to Congress the establishment of a system of national banks, each empowered to issue banknotes backed not with gold but with federal bonds. This December 1861 proposal was initially ignored by Congress, which in February 1862 decided instead to pass the First Legal Tender Act, authorizing the production of not more than $150 million of these legal tender United States Notes. Two additional issues were deemed necessary, approved in June 1862 and January 1863, so that by the end of the war some $450 million of this non-gold-backed currency was in circulation.

The new United States Notes were popularly known as "greenbacks" due to the vibrant green ink used on the reverse side of the bill. A dual currency system emerged in which this fiat money circulated side by side with ostensibly gold-backed currency and gold coin, with the value of the former bearing a discount in trade. The greatest differential in value of these currencies came in 1864, when the value of a gold dollar equaled $1.85 in greenback currency.

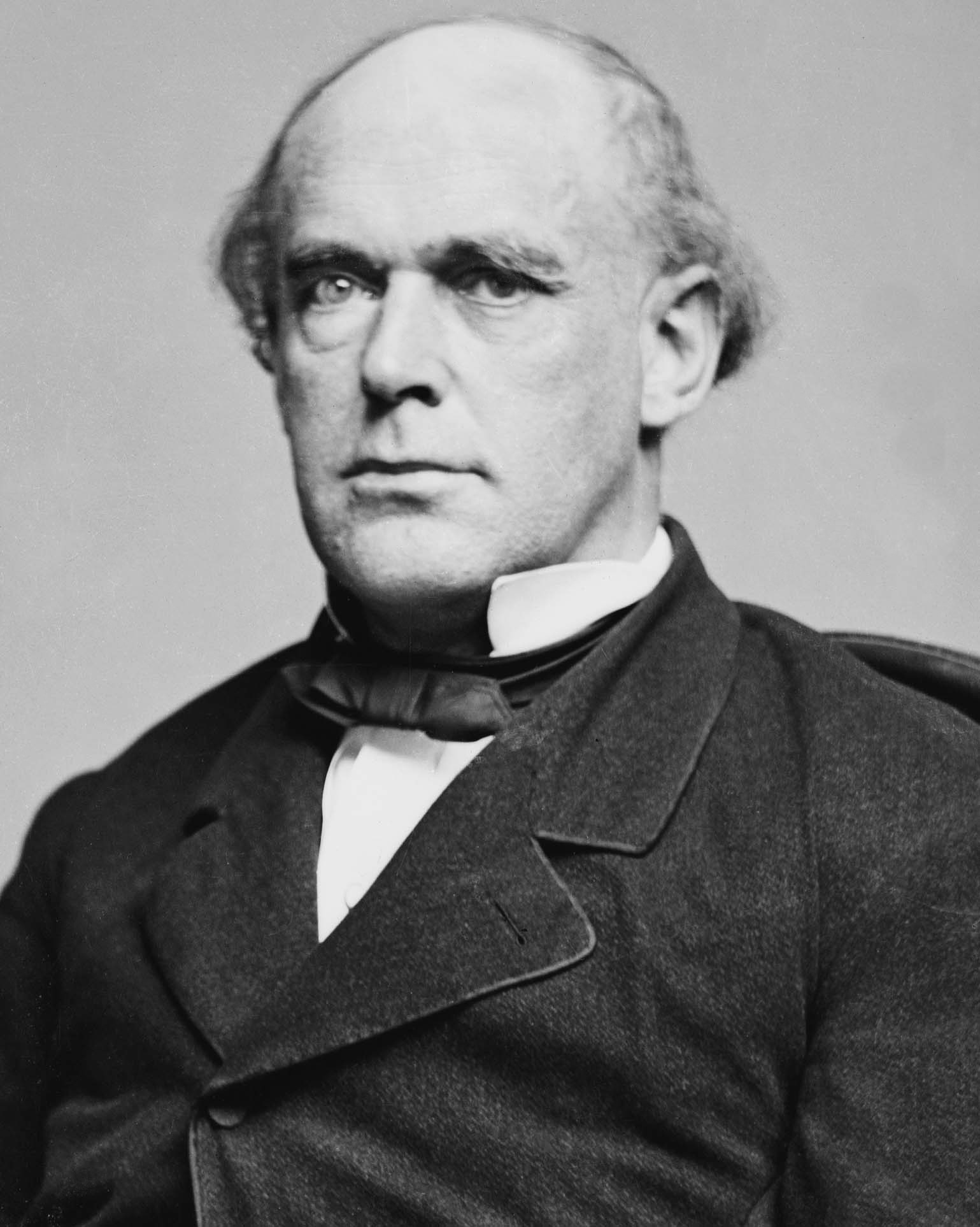
Salmon P. Chase, Abraham Lincoln's Secretary of the Treasury, was a leading exponent of so-called "greenback" currency during the American Civil War

Congress finally enacted Treasury Secretary Chase's National Bank plan in January 1863, creating another form of currency, also backed by government bonds rather than gold and redeemable in United States Notes. This non-gold-based currency became the functional equivalent of greenbacks in circulation, further expanding the money supply.

With the production of consumer goods impacted by the conversion of factories to wartime production and the expansion of the money supply, the United States of America experienced a period of protracted inflation during the Civil War. Between the years 1860 and 1865, the cost of living nearly doubled. As is the case in all inflationary periods, there were winners and losers created by the significant fall in currency value, with banks and creditors receiving less real value from the loans repaid by debtors. Pressure began to build in the financial industry for a rectification of the weak currency situation.

A change of heads at the Treasury Department in March 1865 proved the occasion for a change of course in American monetary policy. New Secretary of the Treasury Hugh McCulloch not only declared himself sympathetic to the banking industry's desire for restoration of a gold-based currency, but he declared the resumption of gold payments to be his primary aim. In December 1865, McCulloch formally sought approval from Congress to retire the greenback currency from circulation, a necessary first step towards restoration of the gold standard. In response, Congress passed the Contraction Act of 1866, calling for the withdrawal of $10 million in United States Notes within the first 6 months and an addition $4 million per month thereafter. Substantial contraction of the physical money supply followed.

About $44 million in greenback currency was successfully withdrawn from circulation before a recession in 1867 helped fuel opposition in Congress to the deflationary redemption program. In February 1868, Congress terminated the Redemption Act and a state of what is today known as gridlock emerged, during which Congress refused to either formally leave the gold standard or to redeem its non-gold currency in circulation. Secretary of the Treasury of the Grant administration George S. Boutwell formally abandoned the contraction policy and embraced the ongoing state of political inertia.

Currency policy emerged as a hot topic in national politics, with politically active farmers and representatives of the fledgling national trade union movement endorsing a weak greenback-type currency as conducive to the needs of these groups as debtors. A looser currency supply was seen as a way of breaking the perceived stranglehold on the national economy held by banks and wealthy industrialists. Chief among these supporters of so-called "Greenbackism" was the National Labor Union (NLU), established in 1866. This and other groups began to turn to political action in 1870 in an effort to advance their political agenda, with an August 1870 convention calling for the establishment of the National Labor Reform Party.

Joining organized labor were the organized farmers in the form of the Patrons of Husbandry, commonly known as the Grange. Established in 1867, the Grange concerned itself with the monopoly power exerted by railroads, which used various aggressive pricing mechanisms for its own benefit against the farmers who shipped commodities over its lines. When the Grangers turned to politics around the start of the 1870s, railroad price reform was chief on its agenda, with currency reform making it easier for debtors to repay their loans a distinctly lesser concern.

The Greenback Party would be an alliance of organized labor and reform-minded farmers intent on toppling the political hegemony of the industrial- and banking-oriented Republican Party which ruled the North during the Reconstruction period.

=== 1873 economic crisis and response ===
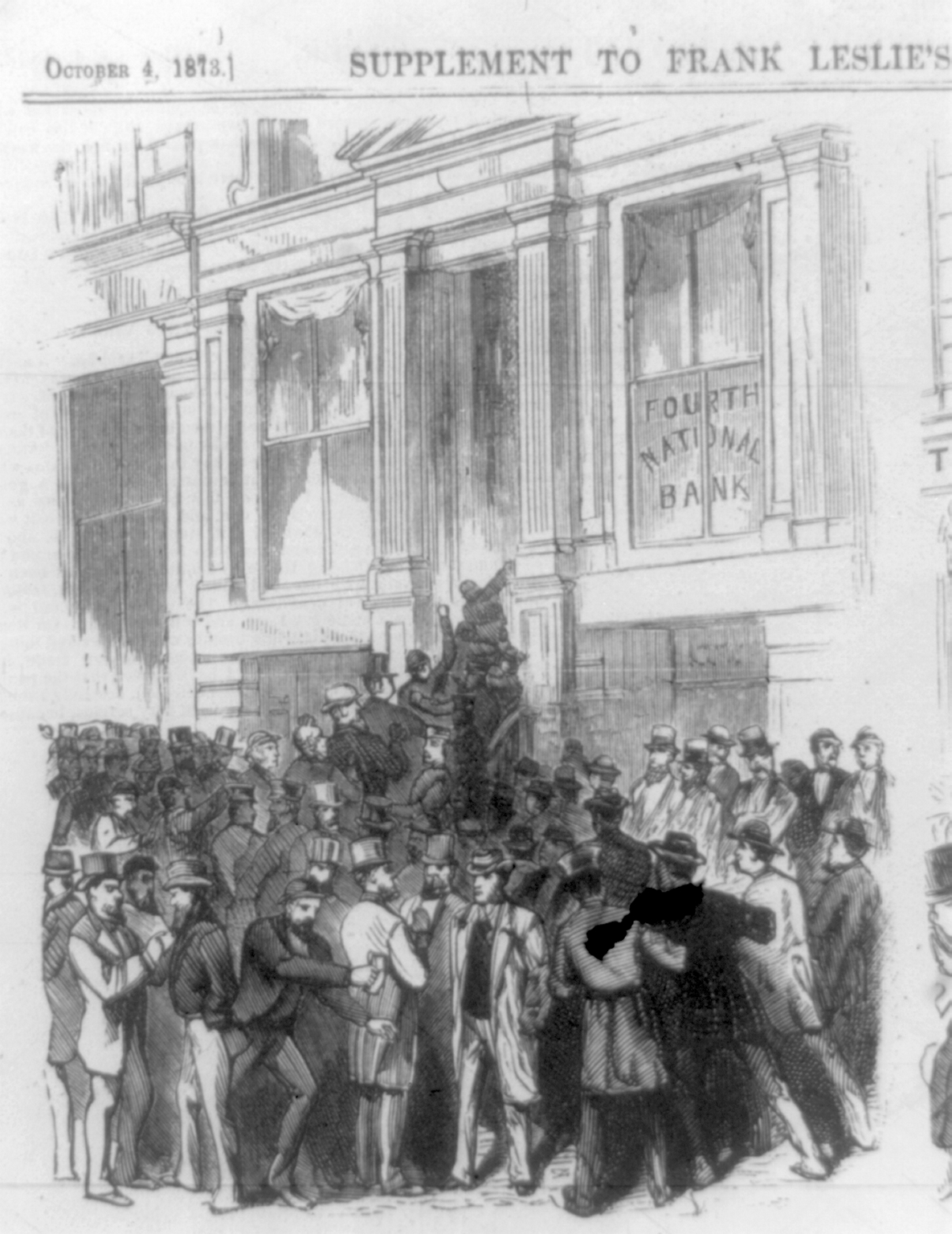
Contemporary news illustration of a run on the 4th National Bank of New York during the Panic of 1873

The late 1860s and early 1870s were a time of frenetic railway construction and associated land speculation. Rather than a managed system of national railroad construction through public works or leaving the construction of lines strictly to market forces, Congress attempted to spur the growth of the industry through the grant of enormous tracts of public lands to privately owned railway companies. In May 1869, the First transcontinental railroad across the North American continent was completed, bringing many localities to within reach of a national market for the first time.

A frenzy to complete additional railway lines to open up new frontier areas for development followed, a situation in which the United States government and the great railroad companies of the day maintained a common interest. In an effort to speed such development, Congress granted cash loans and some 129 million acres (52.2 million hectares) of publicly owned land to subsidize construction.

A great part of this massive stockpile of land needed to be converted into cash by the railways to finance their building activities, since railroad construction was a costly undertaking. New settlement had to be attracted to the virgin lands west of the Missouri River, which had been previously regarded by the public as worthless to the needs of agriculture due to insufficiencies of the soil as well as the arid climate. Millions of advertising dollars were spent by the railway companies promoting the agricultural development of the land which they had to sell. Populations skyrocketed and marginal lands were sold and settled.

In 1873, the economic bubble burst. The Panic began with a crisis in the overextended railroad industry, when the brokerage house Jay Cooke & Company found itself unable to sell enough Northern Pacific Railroad bonds to meet its financial obligations, leading to a default on loans and setting off a financial chain reaction. Runs began on banks, causing a series of bank failures, and manufacturers shuttered their production, laying off workers. Dozens of marginal railroads went bankrupt while unemployment skyrocketed. A lengthy depression ensued, continuing through 1878.

Pressure was placed on Congress to alleviate the business crisis through reinflation of the currency, pitting railroad promoters and the iron industry against Eastern bankers and the merchant elite, who favored a stable, gold-based currency. Although those favoring currency expansion won the day in Congress, which passed an Inflation Bill calling for a $46 million boost in output of National Bank notes that would raise the ceiling on unbacked currency back to $400 million, the legislation was vetoed by President Grant on April 22, 1874.

The next Congress moved in the other direction, with the Republican leadership making use of steamroller tactics in order to finally resolve the dual currency situation through passage of the Specie Payment Resumption Act. Under the plan the government would accumulate a sufficient gold reserve over the next several years through the sale of interest-bearing bonds for gold, using the accumulated metal to redeem the greenback currency on January 1, 1879. This deflationary move further tightened the already contracting economy, moving currency reform higher on the list of objectives of politically minded farmers.

With the Democratic Party still discredited in the minds of many Northerners for its pro-Southern orientation and the Republican Party dominated by pro-gold interests, conditions had become ripe for the emergence of a new political organization to challenge the political hegemony of the two established parties of American politics.

=== Establishment ===
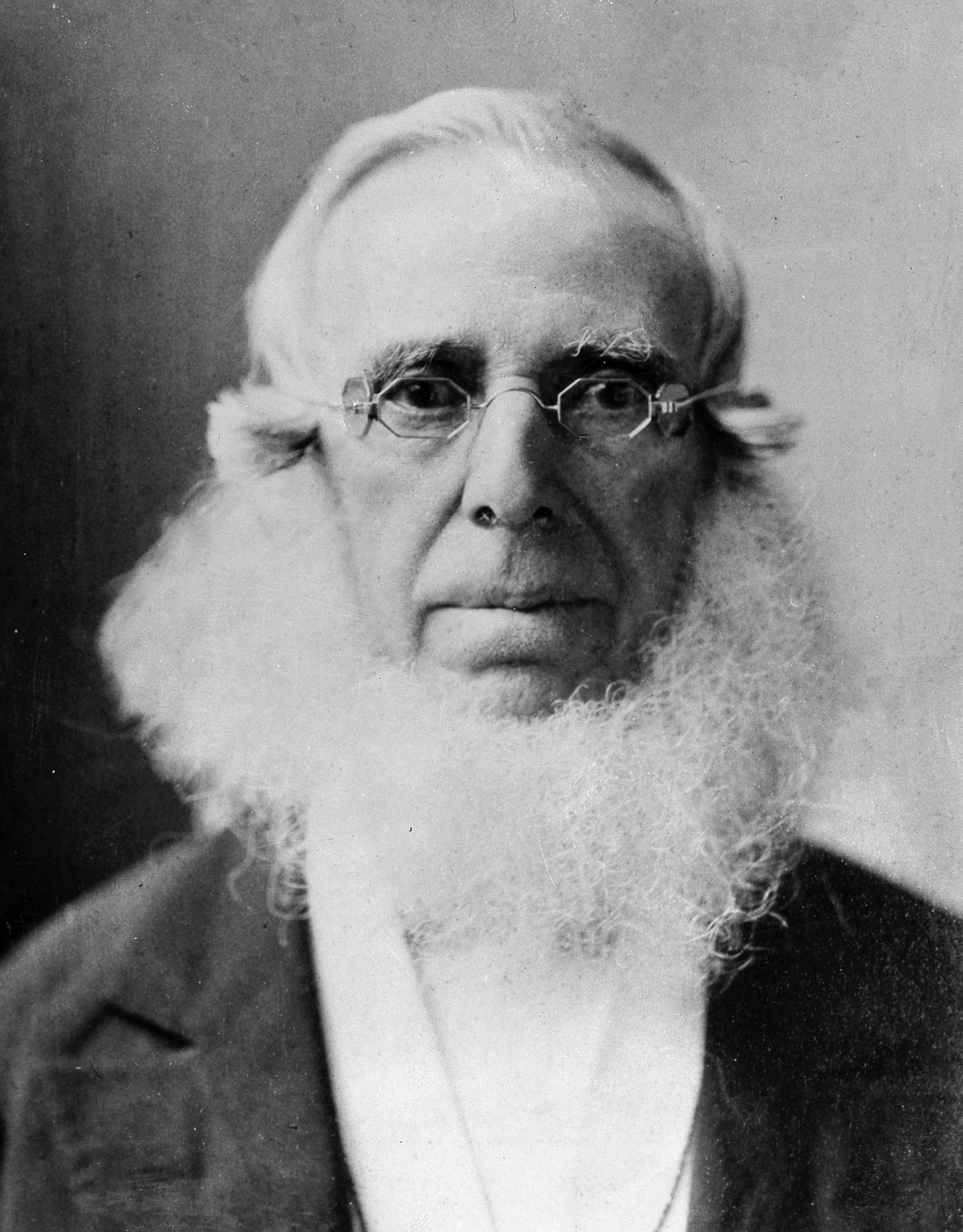
Peter Cooper of New York, presidential candidate of the Greenback Party.

The Greenback Party emerged gradually from the consolidation of like-minded state-level political organizations of differing names. According to historian Paul Kleppner, the origin of the Greenback Party is to be found in the state of Indiana, where early in 1873 a group of reform-minded farmers and political activists declared themselves free of the two established parties and established themselves as the Independent Party. One of the founding members, John C. Wilde, is cited several times in a northern Michigan newspaper from 1898 explaining the reasons for the beginning of the Party. The group nominated a slate for statewide office, running on a platform which called for expansion of the national currency. (In Wisconsin in the same year, a short-lived Reform Party, also called Liberal Reform Party or People's Reform Party, a coalition of Democrats, reform-minded Republicans, and Grangers secured the election of William Robert Taylor as Governor of Wisconsin for a two-year term, as well as a number of state legislators, but it never formed a coherent organization.)

The Indiana Independent organization cast its eyes upon a broader existence the following year, issuing a convention call in August 1874 urging all "greenback men" to assemble at Indianapolis in November to form a new national political party. The result of this call was an undelegated gathering of individuals held in November in Indianapolis which was more akin to an organizational conference than a formal convention. No new party was formally established, but a governing Executive Committee was named for the prospective National Independent Party, with the body assigned the task of composing a declaration of principles and issuing another call for a formal founding convention.

Several regional conventions took place in 1875, merging the activities of local political parties towards a single end. Most of those attending these initial gatherings were farmers or lawyers, with few urban wage workers or trade union officials — the union movement having been shattered and atomized following the Panic of 1873.

The party nominated its first national ticket at a convention held in Indianapolis in May 1876. The party's platform focused upon repeal of the Specie Resumption Act of 1875 and the renewed use of non-gold-backed United States Notes in an effort to restore prosperity through an expanded money supply. The convention nominated New York economics pamphleteer Peter Cooper as its presidential standard-bearer.

Cooper declared to the convention:

The paper currency, commonly called 'legal tenders' or 'greenbacks,' was actually paid out for value received as so much gold, when gold could not be obtained ... But whether our currency will always be on a par with gold or not, ... the commercial and industrial prosperity of a country do not depend upon the amount of gold and silver there is in circulation. Our prosperity must continually depend upon the industry, the enterprise, and the busy internal trade and a true independence of foreign nations, which a paper circulation, well based on credit, has always been found to promote.

The Greenback movement argued that the previous effort of using an unbacked currency had been sabotaged by monied interests, which had prevailed upon Congress to restrict the functionality of the notes — declaring them unsuitable for the payment of taxes or national debt. This inevitably depreciated the value of the unbacked currency when circulated side by side with fully functional gold-backed notes, the Greenback movement argued. Moreover, this differential in values was exploited by speculators, who purchased unbacked currency at a severe discount with gold-backed notes and then pressured Congress into redemption of the same at a 1-to-1 rate — thereby netting the speculator a tidy profit.

The Greenback Party of 1876 drew the support almost exclusively from farmers — few urban workmen cast ballots for the Greenback ticket. The situation changed somewhat in the summer of 1877, however, when a strike movement erupted across the country, leading to the suppression of local strike actions by Federal troops and a radicalization of workers. A myriad of local political organizations, independent not only of the Republican and Democratic Parties but also of the fledgling Greenback Party sprung up around the country, concentrated in the states of Ohio, Pennsylvania, and New York.

=== Development ===
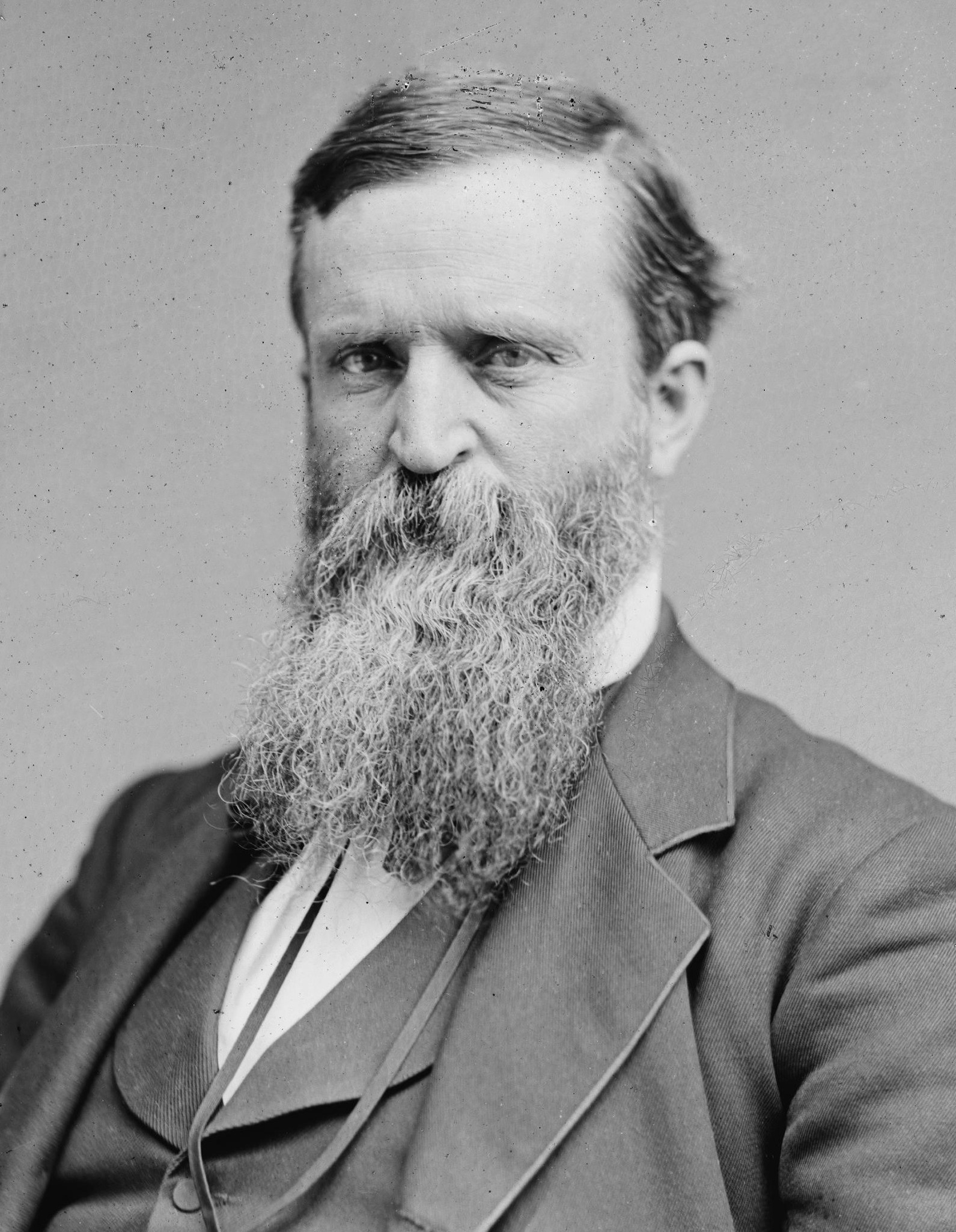
James B. Weaver, presidential nominee of the Greenback Labor Party, was later a prominent figure in the Populist movement.

In the late 1870s, the party controlled local government in a number of industrial and mining communities and contributed to the election of 21 members in the United States Congress independent of the two major parties. The movement found particular success at the 1874 elections in Wisconsin, California, Iowa and Kansas.

This led the Chicago Weekly Tribune to state that the movement offered, "an opportunity to accomplish something for the country at large — not for the farmers merely, but for all who live by their industry, as distinguished from those who live by politics, speculations and class-legislation." Frustrated by their inability to get Democrats or Republicans to adopt inflationary monetary policy, southern and western leaders of monetary reform met in Indianapolis and proposed the creation of a new political party for currency reform. They would meet again in Cleveland to formally launch the Greenback Party in 1875. The Greenbackers condemned the National Banking System, created by the National Banking Act of 1863, the harmonization of the silver dollar (Coinage Act of 1873 was in fact the "Crime of '73" to Greenback), and the Resumption Act of 1875, which mandated that the U.S. Treasury issue specie (coinage or "hard" currency) in exchange for greenback currency upon its presentation for redemption beginning on January 1, 1879, thus returning the nation to the gold standard. Together, these measures created an inflexible currency controlled by banks rather than the federal government. Greenbacks contended that such a system favored creditors and industry to the detriment of farmers and laborers.

In 1880, the Greenback Party broadened its platform to include support for an income tax, an eight-hour day, and allowing women the right to vote. Ideological similarities also existed between the Grange and the Greenback movement. For example, both the Grange and the GAP favored a national graduated income tax and proposed that public lands be given to settlers rather than sold to land speculators. The town of Greenback, Tennessee, was named after the Greenback Party about 1882.

The party seems to have made use of slightly different official names in some states, with the organization appearing on the ballot in the November 1880 Sacramento, California, city election as the "Greenback Labor and Socialist Party".

Among its national spokesmen, although not the best known, was Thomas Ewing, Jr., a noted Free State advocate in Kansas before the civil war, a controversial major general of Union forces during the war, and a Republican turned Democrat after the Grant Administration. His national debates on Greenback monetary policy led the party's growth and influence as spokesmen against the post-war redevelopment of monopolistic gold-based capitalism. Ewing's advice to Andrew Johnson had helped point the administration towards an anti-gold-standard Treasury department.

Ewing served in Congress from 1877 to 1881 during the Hayes administration as a leading spokesman for those national politicians who wanted the nation's money supply used to expand commerce and fund westward expansion of the nation, not repay in gold the interest on civil war bonds Eastern bankers had bought to fund much of the civil war effort but whose antebellum lending practices to the South had helped slavery flourish. His 1875 national debates with hard money New York Governor Stewart L. Woodford set the stage for a rapid but brief rise in party national influence.

=== Decline and dissolution ===
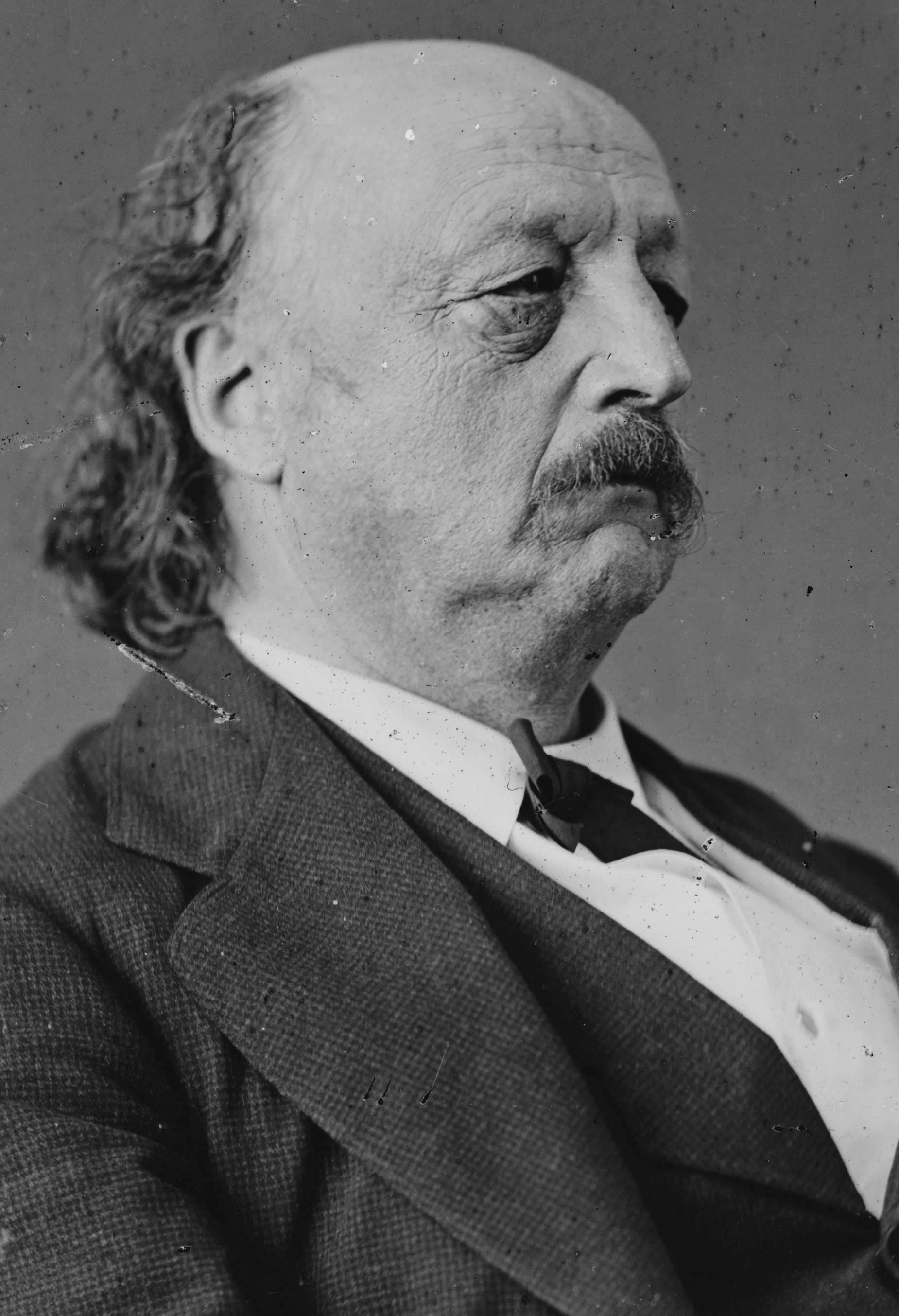
Representative Benjamin F. Butler of Massachusetts was the Greenback nominee for president in 1884

The Greenback Party was in decline throughout the entire Grover Cleveland administration. In the election of 1884, the party failed to win any House seats outright, although they did win one seat in conjunction with Plains States Democrats, James B. Weaver, as well as a handful of other seats by endorsing the Democratic nominee.

In the election of 1886, only two dozen Greenback candidates ran for the House, apart from another six who ran on fusion tickets. Again, Weaver was the party's only victory. Much of the Greenback news in early 1888 took place in Michigan, where the party remained active.

In early 1888, it was not clear if the Greenback Party would hold another national convention. The 4th Greenback Party National Convention assembled in Cincinnati, Ohio, on May 16, 1888. There were so few delegates who attended that no actions were taken. On August 16, 1888, George O. Jones, chairman of the national committee, called a second session of the national convention. The second session of the national convention met in Cincinnati on September 12, 1888. Only seven delegates attended. Chairman Jones issued an address criticizing the two major parties, and the delegates made no nominations. With the failure of the convention, the Greenback Party ceased to exist.

=== Legacy ===
Many Greenback activists, including 1880 Presidential nominee James B. Weaver, later participated in the Populist Party. By the middle of the 1880s, Greenback Labor nationally was losing its labor-based support, in part as a result of craft union voluntarism and in part as a result of Irish defections back to the Democratic Party.

Historian Paul Kleppner has observed that one of the traditional functions of third parties in the American political system has been the raising of new issues, the testing of their viability amongst the electorate, and the pressuring of established political parties to appropriate these issues as part of their own electoral agenda. In this the Greenback Party and the People's Party which followed it were ultimately successful, moving the Democratic Party to espouse looser monetary policy and an ultimate abandonment of the gold standard.

== Conventions ==
Convention	Location	Date	Comments
Indiana Organizational Conference	Indianapolis	Nov. 25, 1874	Meeting of the "Independent Party" of Indiana. Plans to call a national convention.
National Organizational Convention	Cleveland	March 1875	Establishes national Independent Party.
Organizational Convention	Cincinnati	September 1875	Organized by philanthropist Horace H. Day in protest of March 1875 convention's failure to address labor concerns. Participants voted to fuse with Independent Party.
1st National Convention	Indianapolis	May 16–18, 1876	Convention of the national Independent Party (Greenback Party) attended by 239 delegates from 17 states. Nominated Peter Cooper for President.
Greenback Labor Party Founding Convention	Toledo, Ohio	February 22, 1878	Convention united the Greenback Party with the Labor Reform Party to establish the "Greenback Labor Party". Expands platform to include labor concerns.
2nd Greenback Labor National Convention	Chicago	June 9–10, 1880	Attended by 714 delegates. Nominated James B. Weaver for president and Barzillai J. Chambers for VP.
3rd Greenback Labor National Convention	Indianapolis	May 28–29, 1884	Benjamin Franklin Butler nominated for president and Absolom M. West for VP.
4th Greenback Labor Convention (aborted)	Cincinnati	May 16, 1888	So few delegates in attendance that no action was taken.
4th Greenback Labor National Convention	Cincinnati	Sept. 12, 1888	Only 8 delegates attended and no candidates were nominated.

== Electoral history ==
=== Federal Offices ===
U.S. Presidency
Year	Nominee	Running-mate	# votes	% votes (Nationally)	% votes (Where Organized)	Place	Performance Map
1876	Peter Cooper	Samuel Fenton Cary	83,726	0.99 / 100 (Note: Of 8,418,659 votes)	1.48 / 100 (Note: Of 5,643,579 votes)	3rd	
1880	James B. Weaver	Barzillai J. Chambers	308,649	3.35 / 100 (Note: Of 9,219,477 votes)	3.51 / 100 (Note: Of 8,781,342 votes)	3rd	
1884	Benjamin Butler	Absolom M. West	134,294	1.33 / 100 (Note: Of 10,060,145 votes)	1.60 / 100 (Note: Of 8,414,853 votes)	4th	

=== State Offices ===
U.S. Governors
Election	State	Nominee	Fusion	Votes			State	Nominee	Fusion	Votes			Seats (Party and Endorsed)	
Election	State	Nominee	Fusion	No.	Share	Place	State	Nominee	Fusion	No.	Share	Place	Seats (Party and Endorsed)	
1876	Connecticut (April)	Charles Atwater	Greenback	1,966	1.99 / 100	3rd	Missouri	J. P. Alexander	Greenback	2,962	0.85 / 100	3rd	0 / 38	Steady
1876	Connecticut (November)	Charles Atwater	Greenback	630	0.52 / 100	4th	Nebraska	Jonathan F. Gardner	Greenback	3,022	5.79 / 100	3rd	0 / 38	Steady
1876	Indiana	Henry W. Harrington	Greenback	12,710	2.93 / 100	3rd	New York	Richard M. Griffin	Greenback	1,436	0.14 / 100	4th	0 / 38	Steady
1876	Michigan	Levi Sparks	Greenback	8,297	2.62 / 100	3rd	West Virginia	J. M. Laidley	Greenback	332	0.33 / 100	3rd	0 / 38	Steady
1877	Iowa	Daniel P. Stubbs	Greenback	34,316	13.97 / 100	3rd	New Jersey	Thomas B. Hoxey	Greenback	5,069	2.68 / 100	3rd	0 / 38	Steady
1877	Maine	Henry C. Munson	Greenback	5,291	5.18 / 100	3rd	Ohio	Lewis H. Bond	Greenback	12,489	2.25 / 100	3rd	0 / 38	Steady
1877	Massachusetts	Wendell Phillips	Greenback	3,552	1.93 / 100	4th	Rhode Island	William Foster Jr.	Greenback	77	0.31 / 100	3rd	0 / 38	Steady
1877	Minnesota	William Meighen	Greenback	2,396	2.40 / 100	3rd	Wisconsin	Edward P. Allis	Greenback	26,216	14.72 / 100	3rd	0 / 38	Steady
1878	Colorado	R. G. Buckingham	Greenback	2,783	9.72 / 100	3rd	New Hampshire (March)	Samuel Flint	Greenback	269	0.35 / 100	3rd	0 / 38	Steady
1878	Connecticut	Charles Atwater	Greenback	8,314	7.94 / 100	3rd	New Hampshire (November)	Warren G. Brown	Greenback	6,507	8.57 / 100	3rd	0 / 38	Steady
1878	Delaware	Kensey Johns Stewart	Greenback	2,835	20.77 / 100	2nd	Oregon	M. Wilkins	Greenback	1,434	4.38 / 100	3rd	0 / 38	Steady
1878	Kansas	David P. Mitchell	Greenback	27,057	19.57 / 100	3rd	Pennsylvania	Samuel R. Mason	Greenback	81,758	11.65 / 100	3rd	0 / 38	Steady
1878	Maine	Joseph L. Smith	Greenback	41,371	32.79 / 100	2nd	Rhode Island	William Foster Jr.	Greenback	590	2.99 / 100	3rd	0 / 38	Steady
1878	Massachusetts	Benjamin Butler	Greenback	109,435	42.69 / 100	2nd	Tennessee	Richard M. Edwards	Greenback	15,155	10.28 / 100	3rd	0 / 38	Steady
1878	Michigan	Henry S. Smith	Greenback	73,313	25.93 / 100	3rd	Texas	William H. Hamman	Greenback	55,002	21.20 / 100	2nd	0 / 38	Steady
1878	Nebraska	Levi G. Todd	Greenback	9,475	18.08 / 100	3rd	Vermont	Carlos C. Martin	Greenback	2,635	4.55 / 100	2nd	0 / 38	Steady
1879	Iowa	Daniel Campbell	Greenback	45,674	15.65 / 100	3rd	Minnesota	William Meighen	Greenback	4,264	4.02 / 100	3rd	0 / 38	Steady
1879	Kentucky	Charles W. Cook	Greenback	18,954	8.38 / 100	3rd	New York	Harris Lewis	Greenback	20,286	2.26 / 100	4th	0 / 38	Steady
1879	Maine	Joseph L. Smith	Greenback	47,987	34.68 / 100	2nd	Ohio	A. Sanders Piatt	Greenback	9,072	1.36 / 100	3rd	0 / 38	Steady
1879	Maryland	Howard Meeks	Greenback	265	0.17 / 100	3rd	Rhode Island	Samuel Hill	Greenback	318	2.03 / 100	3rd	0 / 38	Steady
1879	Massachusetts	Benjamin Butler	Greenback	109,149	44.80 / 100	2nd	Wisconsin	Reuben May	Greenback	12,996	6.88 / 100	3rd	0 / 38	Steady
1880	Alabama	James M. Pickens	Greenback	42,363	23.90 / 100	2nd	Missouri	Luman A. Brown	Greenback	36,340	9.14 / 100	3rd	1 / 38	▲1
1880	Arkansas	William P. Parks	Greenback	31,424	27.18 / 100	2nd	Nebraska	Oliver T. B. Williams	Greenback	3,898	4.46 / 100	3rd	1 / 38	▲1
1880	Colorado	A. J. Chittenden	Greenback	1,408	2.64 / 100	3rd	New Hampshire	Warren G. Brown	Greenback	503	0.58 / 100	3rd	1 / 38	▲1
1880	Connecticut	Henry C. Baldwin	Greenback	897	0.68 / 100	3rd	New Jersey	Thomas B. Hoxey	Greenback	2,759	1.12 / 100	3rd	1 / 38	▲1
1880	Illinois	Alson Streeter	Greenback	28,898	4.65 / 100	3rd	South Carolina	L. W. R. Blair	Greenback	4,277	3.51 / 100	2nd	1 / 38	▲1
1880	Indiana	Robert Gregg	Greenback	14,881	3.16 / 100	3rd	Tennessee	Richard M. Edwards	Greenback	3,614	1.48 / 100	4th	1 / 38	▲1
1880	Kansas	H. P. Vrooman	Greenback	19,481	9.80 / 100	3rd	Texas	William H. Hamman	Greenback	33,721	12.76 / 100	3rd	1 / 38	▲1
1880	Maine	Harris M. Plaisted	Greenback	73,713	49.91 / 100	Elected	Vermont	Madison O. Heath	Greenback	1,578	2.23 / 100	3rd	1 / 38	▲1
1880	Massachusetts	Horace B. Sargent	Greenback	4,864	1.72 / 100	3rd	West Virginia	N. B. French	Greenback	13,027	10.96 / 100	3rd	1 / 38	▲1
1880	Michigan	David Woodman	Greenback	31,085	8.90 / 100	3rd							1 / 38	▲1
1881	Iowa	David M. Clark	Greenback	28,112	11.96 / 100	3rd	Rhode Island	Charles P. Adams	Greenback	285	1.76 / 100	3rd	1 / 38	Steady
1881	Massachusetts	Israel W. Andrews	Greenback	4,889	3.10 / 100	3rd	Wisconsin	Edward P. Allis	Greenback	7,002	4.07 / 100	4th	1 / 38	Steady
1881	Minnesota	Charles H. Roberts	Greenback	2,676	2.54 / 100	3rd							1 / 38	Steady
1882	Arkansas	Rufus King Garland Jr.	Greenback	10,142	6.89 / 100	3rd	New Hampshire	John Woodbury	Greenback	444	0.58 / 100	3rd	2 / 38	▲1
1882	California	Thomas J. McQuiddy	Greenback	1,020	0.62 / 100	4th	New York	Epenetus Howe	Greenback	11,974	1.31 / 100	4th	2 / 38	▲1
1882	Colorado	George Woy	Greenback	1,220	1.99 / 100	3rd	Pennsylvania	Thomas A. Armstrong	Greenback	23,484	3.16 / 100	4th	2 / 38	▲1
1882	Connecticut	Abel P. Tanner	Greenback	697	0.60 / 100	4th	Rhode Island	Charles P. Adams	Greenback	120	0.77 / 100	3rd	2 / 38	▲1
1882	Kansas	Charles L. Robinson	Greenback	20,933	11.67 / 100	3rd	South Carolina	J. Hendrix McLane	Greenback	17,719	20.84 / 100	2nd	2 / 38	▲1
1882	Maine	Solon Chase	Greenback	1,324	0.96 / 100	3rd	Tennessee	J. R. Beasley	Greenback	9,660	4.23 / 100	3rd	2 / 38	▲1
1882	Massachusetts	Benjamin Butler	Democratic	133,946	52.27 / 100	Elected	Texas	George Washington Jones	Independent	102,501	40.41 / 100	2nd	2 / 38	▲1
1882	Michigan	Josiah Begole	Democratic	154,269	49.42 / 100	Elected	Vermont	Carlos C. Martin	Greenback	1,535	2.96 / 100	3rd	2 / 38	▲1
1882	Nebraska	Edward P. Ingersoll	Greenback	16,991	19.07 / 100	3rd							2 / 38	▲1
1883	Iowa	James B. Weaver	Greenback	23,089	7.06 / 100	3rd	New Jersey	Benjamin Urner	Greenback	2,960	1.42 / 100	4th	1 / 38	▼1
1883	Massachusetts	Benjamin Butler	Democratic	150,228	48.10 / 100	Lost Re-election; 2nd	Ohio	Charles Jenkins	Greenback	2,937	0.41 / 100	4th	1 / 38	▼1
1884	Colorado	John E. Washburn	Greenback	2,104	3.15 / 100	3rd	Michigan	Josiah Begole	Democratic	186,887	46.68 / 100	Lost Re-election; 2nd	0 / 38	▼1
1884	Connecticut	James L. Curtis	Greenback	1,379	1.00 / 100	4th	New Hampshire	George Carpenter	Greenback	490	0.58 / 100	4th	0 / 38	▼1
1884	Illinois	Jesse Harper	Greenback	8,605	1.28 / 100	4th	Tennessee	(FNU) Buchanan	Greenback	549	0.21 / 100	3rd	0 / 38	▼1
1884	Indiana	Hiram Z. Leonard	Greenback	8,338	1.68 / 100	3rd	Texas	George Washington Jones	Independent	88,450	27.11 / 100	2nd	0 / 38	▼1
1884	Kansas	H.L. Phillips	Greenback	9,998	3.77 / 100	3rd	Vermont	Samuel Soule	Greenback	635	1.00 / 100	3rd	0 / 38	▼1
1884	Maine	Hosea B. Eaton	Greenback	3,142	2.21 / 100	3rd	Wisconsin	William L. Utley	Greenback	4,274	1.34 / 100	4th	0 / 38	▼1
1884	Massachusetts	Matthew J. McCafferty	Greenback	24,363	8.01 / 100	3rd							0 / 38	▼1
1885	Iowa	Elias Doty	Greenback	314	0.09 / 100	4th	New York	George O. Jones	Greenback	2,130	0.21 / 100	4th	0 / 38	Steady
1885	Massachusetts	James Sumner	Greenback	2,227	1.06 / 100	4th	Ohio	John W. Northrop	Greenback	2,001	0.27 / 100	4th	0 / 38	Steady
1886	Pennsylvania	Robert J. Houston	Greenback	4,835	0.59 / 100	4th	Vermont	Truman B. Smith	Greenback	644	1.13 / 100	4th	0 / 38	Steady

== Elected officials ==
=== U.S. House of Representatives ===
The following were Greenback members of the U.S. House of Representatives:

46th United States Congress, March 4, 1879 - March 3, 1881.

- William M. Lowe (1842–1882), Alabama's 8th congressional district
- Albert P. Forsythe (1830–1906), Illinois's 15th congressional district
- Gilbert De La Matyr (1825–1892), "National" Indiana's 7th congressional district
- James B. Weaver (1833–1912), Iowa's 6th congressional district
- Edward H. Gillette (1840–1918), Iowa's 7th congressional district
- George W. Ladd (1818–1892), Maine's 4th congressional district
- Thompson H. Murch (1838–1886), Maine's 5th congressional district
- Nicholas Ford (1833–1897), Missouri's 9th congressional district
- Daniel Lindsay Russell (1845–1908), North Carolina's 3rd congressional district
- Hendrick B. Wright, Pennsylvania's 12th congressional district
- Seth H. Yocum (1834–1895), Pennsylvania's 20th congressional district
- George Washington Jones (1828–1903), Texas's 5th congressional district
- Bradley Barlow (1814–1889), Vermont's 3rd congressional district

47th United States Congress, March 4, 1881, to March 3, 1883.

- William M. Lowe, Alabama's 8th congressional district.—Seated June 3, 1882, subsequently died August 12, 1882.
- George W. Ladd, Maine's 4th congressional district
- Thompson H. Murch, Maine's 5th congressional district
- Ira S. Haseltine Missouri's 6th congressional district
- Theron M. Rice Missouri's 7th congressional district
- Nicholas Ford, Missouri's 9th congressional district
- Joseph H. Burrows Missouri's 10th congressional district
- Charles N. Brumm, Pennsylvania's 13th congressional district
- James Mosgrove, Pennsylvania's 25th congressional district
- George Washington Jones, Texas' 5th congressional district

48th United States Congress, March 4, 1883, to March 3, 1885.

- Benjamin F. Shively, Anti-Monopolist Indiana's 13th congressional district
- Luman Hamlin Weller, Iowa's 4th congressional district
- Charles N. Brumm, Pennsylvania's 13th congressional district

49th United States Congress, March 4, 1885, to March 3, 1887.

- James Weaver, Iowa's 6th congressional district

50th United States Congress, March 4, 1887, to March 3, 1889.

- James Weaver, Iowa's 6th congressional district

=== Other elected officials ===
- Harriel G. Geiger, lawyer and state legislator in Texas
- Robert A. Kerr, state legislator in Texas
- George Plaisted Sanderson, mayor of Lynn, Massachusetts
- William Williams, mayor of Gloucester, Massachusetts

== See also ==
- Producerism
- United States Note
- List of political parties in the United States
- List of 19th century American labor parties
