= Governor Waller =

Governor Waller may refer to:

- Bill Waller (1926–2011), 56th Governor of Mississippi
- Thomas M. Waller (1839–1924), 51st Governor of Connecticut
