= 1882 Connecticut gubernatorial election =

- November 7, 1882
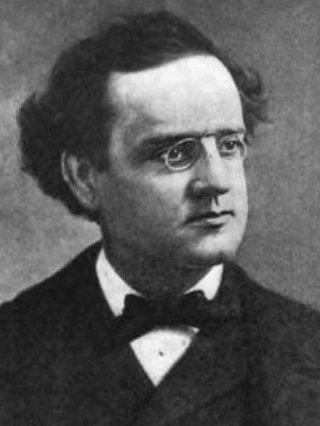

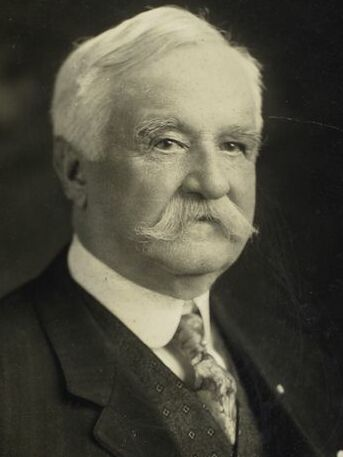
Nominee	Thomas M. Waller	Morgan Bulkeley
Party	Democratic	Republican
Popular vote	59,014	54,853
Percentage	51.04%	47.44%
- Waller: 40–50% 50–60% 60–70% 70–80% Bulkeley: 40–50% 50–60% 60–70% 70–80%
Governor before election
Hobart B. Bigelow
Republican
Elected Governor
Thomas M. Waller
Democratic

The 1882 Connecticut gubernatorial election was held on November 7, 1882. Democratic nominee Thomas M. Waller defeated Republican nominee Morgan Bulkeley with 51.04% of the vote.

== General election ==
=== Candidates ===
Major party candidates

- Thomas M. Waller, Democratic
- Morgan Bulkeley, Republican

Other candidates

- George Rogers, Prohibition
- Abel P. Tanner, Greenback

=== Results ===
1882 Connecticut gubernatorial election
Party	Candidate	Votes	%	±%
Democratic	Thomas M. Waller	59,014	51.04%	
Republican	Morgan Bulkeley	54,853	47.44%	
Prohibition	George Rogers	1,034	0.89%	
Greenback	Abel P. Tanner	697	0.60%	
Majority		4,161		
Turnout				
Democratic gain from Republican		Swing		
