= 1879 Ohio gubernatorial election =

- October 14, 1879
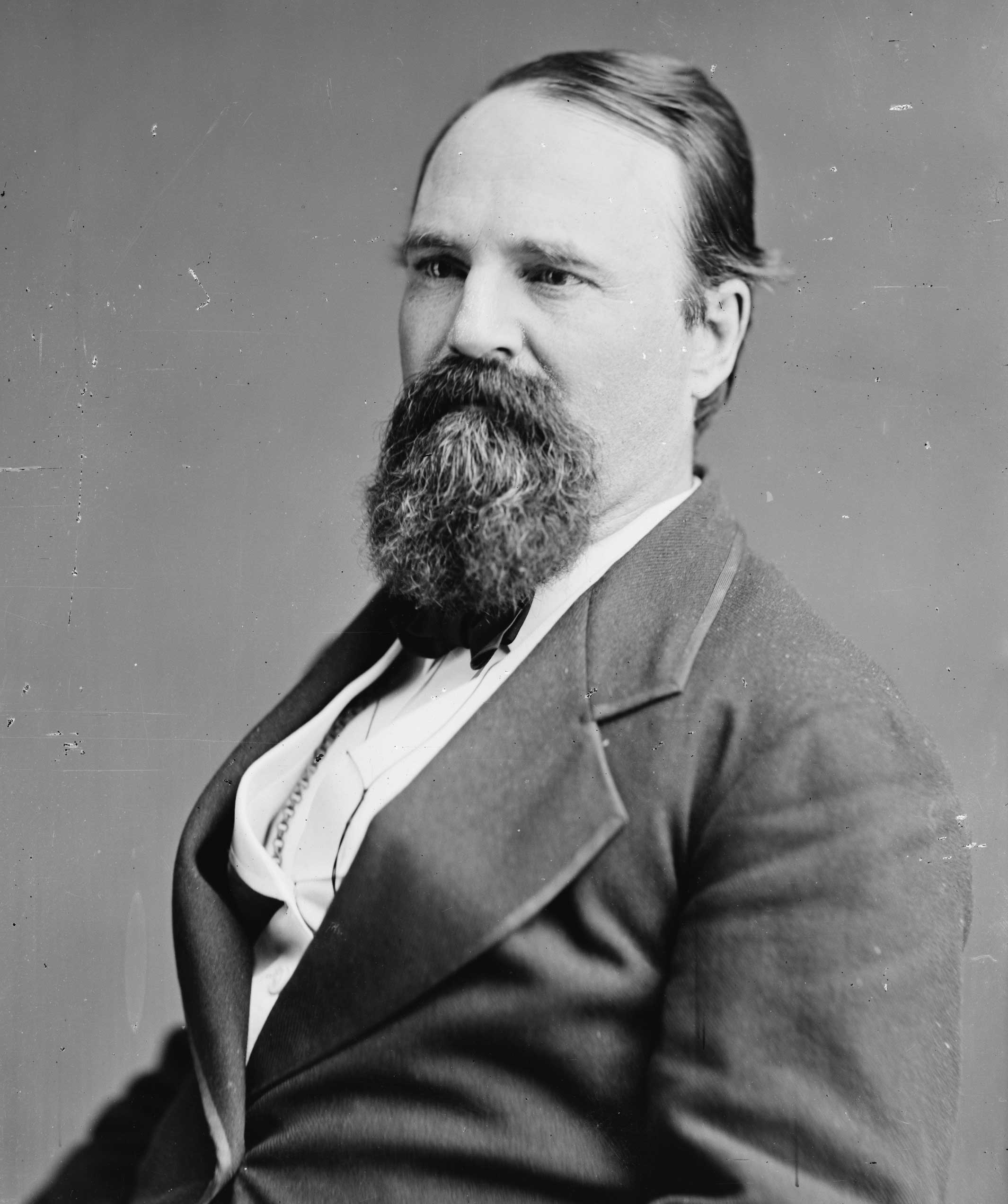

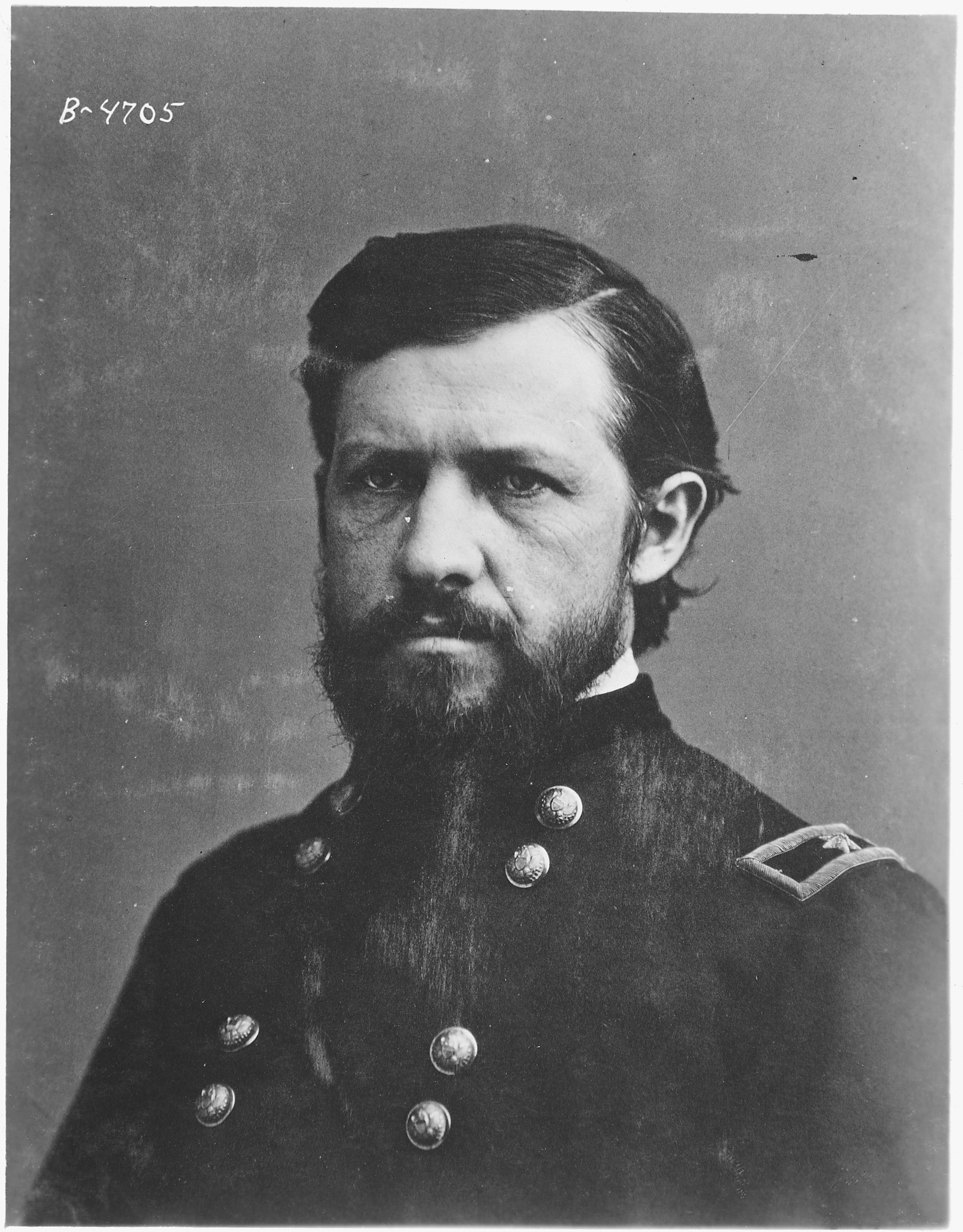
Nominee	Charles Foster	Thomas Ewing Jr.
Party	Republican	Democratic
Popular vote	336,261	319,132
Percentage	50.25%	47.69%
- County results Foster: 40–50% 50–60% 60–70% 70–80% Ewing: 40–50% 50–60% 60–70% 70–80%
Governor before election
Richard M. Bishop
Democratic
Elected Governor
Charles Foster
Republican

The 1879 Ohio gubernatorial election was held on October 14, 1879. Republican nominee Charles Foster defeated Democratic nominee Thomas Ewing Jr. with 50.25% of the vote.

== General election ==
=== Candidates ===
Major party candidates

- Charles Foster, Republican
- Thomas Ewing Jr., Democratic

Other candidates

- A. Sanders Piatt, Greenback
- Gideon T. Stewart, Prohibition
- John Hood, Independent

=== Results ===
1879 Ohio gubernatorial election
Party	Candidate	Votes	%	±%
Republican	Charles Foster	336,261	50.25%	
Democratic	Thomas Ewing Jr.	319,132	47.69%	
Greenback	A. Sanders Piatt	9,072	1.36%	
Prohibition	Gideon T. Stewart	4,145	0.62%	
Independent	John Hood	547	0.08%	
Majority		17,129		
Turnout				
Republican gain from Democratic		Swing		
