= 1877 Rhode Island gubernatorial election =

- April 4, 1877
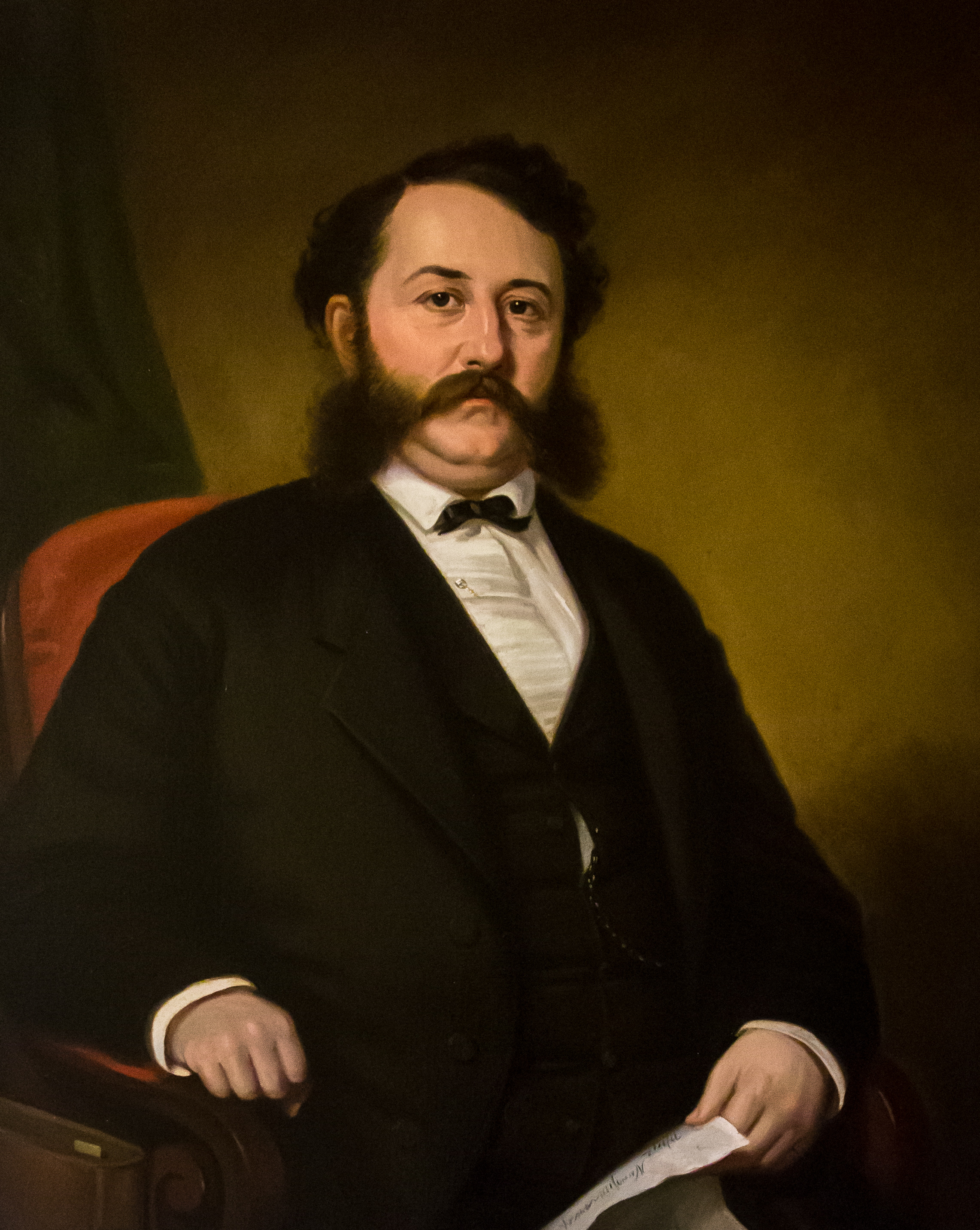

| Nominee | Charles C. Van Zandt | Jerothmul B. Barnaby |
| Party | Republican | Democratic |
| Popular vote | 12,455 | 11,783 |
| Percentage | 50.93% | 48.18% |
- County results Zandt: 50–60% 60–70% Barnaby: 50–60%
Governor before election
Henry Lippitt
Republican
Elected Governor
Charles C. Van Zandt
Republican

The 1877 Rhode Island gubernatorial election was held on April 4, 1877. Republican nominee Charles C. Van Zandt defeated Democratic nominee Jerothmul B. Barnaby with 50.93% of the vote.

== General election ==
=== Candidates ===
Major party candidates

- Charles C. Van Zandt, Republican
- Jerothmul B. Barnaby, Democratic

Other candidates

- William Foster Jr., Greenback

=== Results ===
1877 Rhode Island gubernatorial election
| Party | Candidate | Votes | % | ±% |
|---|---|---|---|---|
| Republican | Charles C. Van Zandt | 12,455 | 50.93% | |
| Democratic | Jerothmul B. Barnaby | 11,783 | 48.18% | |
| Greenback | William Foster Jr. | 77 | 0.31% | |
| Others | Others | 141 | 0.58% | |
| Majority | | 672 | 2.75% | |
| Turnout | | | | |
| Republican hold | | Swing | | |
