= Henry Baldwin Harrison =

American politician (1821–1901)

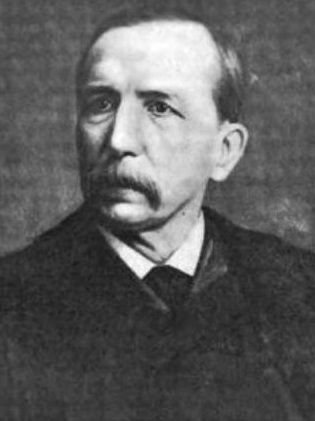

52nd Governor of Connecticut
- In office January 8, 1885 – January 7, 1887
- Lieutenant: Lorrin A. Cooke
- Preceded by: Thomas M. Waller
- Succeeded by: Phineas C. Lounsbury

Member of the Connecticut House of Representatives
- In office 1883; 1873; 1865

Member of the Connecticut Senate
- In office 1854

Personal details
- Born: September 11, 1821 New Haven, Connecticut, U.S.
- Died: October 29, 1901 (aged 80) New Haven, Connecticut, U.S.
- Party: Whig, Republican
- Spouse: Mary Elizabeth Osborne
- Education: Yale College
- Profession: lawyer, politician

Henry Baldwin Harrison (September 11, 1821 – October 29, 1901) was a Republican politician and the 52nd governor of Connecticut.

== Biography ==
Harrison was born in New Haven, Connecticut. He graduated from Yale College as valedictorian in 1846, where he was a member of Skull and Bones, and studied at Yale Law School. He was a member of Connecticut Sons of the American Revolution.

He married Mary Elizabeth Osborne (the daughter of Yale Law School professor and U.S. Representative Thomas Burr Osborne and Ann Sherwood).

== Career ==
Harrison ran for office as a Whig, and in 1854, he won a seat in the Connecticut Senate (4th District). Active in the Whig Party, and author of the Personal Liberty Bill, he was instrumental in bringing about the nullification of the Fugitive Slave Law. During the years from 1855 to 1856, he was one of the men who organized the Republican Party in Connecticut. He lost a bid for Lieutenant Governor of Connecticut in 1857, and for Governor of Connecticut in 1874, but he returned to the Connecticut House of Representatives in 1865, 1873, and 1883; during his last term, he was Speaker of the House.

Harrison was elected governor in 1884, and from 1885 to 1887, Harrison served as Governor of Connecticut. His contributions included initiatives on prohibition and abolition of slavery. Issues of great concern to him were education and workers' rights. He served in the Legislature at the time of the Industrial Revolution and witnessed the growing problems caused by industrialization. As Governor, he created the state Bureau of Labor Statistics, and he pushed for compulsory education to the age of 16 for Connecticut's children.

== Death and legacy ==
Harrison died in New Haven on October 29, 1901, and is interred at Grove Street Cemetery in New Haven. Harrison gave a moving eulogy at the funeral of his cousin, also a Governor of the State of Connecticut, Roger Sherman Baldwin. Harrison said, "It has been well said that Governor Baldwin was a great lawyer. He was an upright, a just, a conscientious and honorable man. Governor Baldwin was a true son of Connecticut. His memory deserves all honors from Connecticut, and from every one of her children."

Party political offices
Preceded by Henry P. Haven	Republican nominee for Governor of Connecticut; 1874	Succeeded by J. Greene
Preceded by Morgan Bulkeley	Republican nominee for Governor of Connecticut; 1884	Succeeded by Phineas C. Lounsbury
Political offices
Preceded by Thomas M. Waller	Governor of Connecticut; 1885–1887	Succeeded by Phineas C. Lounsbury
