= 1874 Connecticut gubernatorial election =

- April 6, 1874
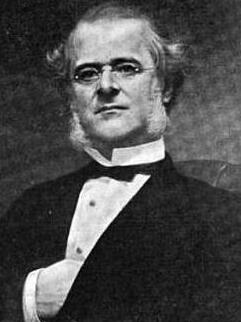

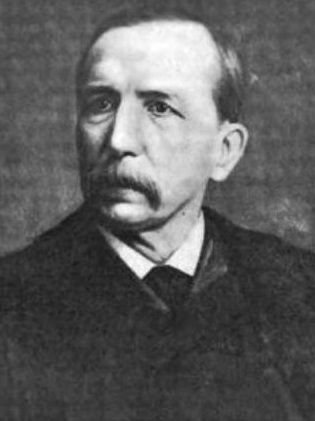

Nominee	Charles R. Ingersoll	Henry B. Harrison	Henry D. Smith
Party	Democratic	Republican	Temperance
Popular vote	46,755	39,973	4,960
Percentage	50.87%	43.49%	5.40%
- Ingersoll: 40–50% 50–60% 60–70% 70–80% Harrison: 40–50% 50–60% 60–70% 70–80%
Governor before election
Charles R. Ingersoll
Democratic
Elected Governor
Charles R. Ingersoll
Democratic

The 1874 Connecticut gubernatorial election was held on April 6, 1874. Incumbent governor and Democratic nominee Charles R. Ingersoll defeated Republican nominee Henry B. Harrison with 50.87% of the vote.

== General election ==
=== Candidates ===
Major party candidates

- Charles R. Ingersoll, Democratic
- Henry B. Harrison, Republican

Other candidates

- Henry D. Smith, Temperance

=== Results ===
1874 Connecticut gubernatorial election
Party	Candidate	Votes	%	±%
Democratic	Charles R. Ingersoll (incumbent)	46,755	50.87%	
Republican	Henry B. Harrison	39,973	43.49%	
Temperance	Henry D. Smith	4,960	5.40%	
Other	Others	225	0.25%	
Majority		6,782		
Turnout				
Democratic hold		Swing		
