= 1875 Connecticut gubernatorial election =

- April 5, 1875
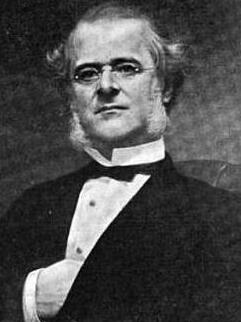

Nominee	Charles R. Ingersoll	J. Greene
Party	Democratic	Republican
Popular vote	53,752	44,272
Percentage	53.23%	43.84%
- Ingersoll: 30–40% 40–50% 50–60% 60–70% 70–80% 90–100% Greene: 40–50% 50–60% 60–70% 70–80% Greene: 70–80% No Data/Vote
Governor before election
Charles R. Ingersoll
Democratic
Elected Governor
Charles R. Ingersoll
Democratic

The 1875 Connecticut gubernatorial election was held on April 5, 1875. Incumbent governor and Democratic nominee Charles R. Ingersoll defeated Republican nominee J. Greene with 53.23% of the vote.

This was the last gubernatorial election to elect the governor of Connecticut to a term of one year, from May 7, 1875, to May 7, 1876.

== General election ==
=== Candidates ===
Major party candidates

- Charles R. Ingersoll, Democratic
- J. Greene, Republican

Other candidates

- Henry D. Smith, Temperance

=== Results ===
1875 Connecticut gubernatorial election
Party	Candidate	Votes	%	±%
Democratic	Charles R. Ingersoll (incumbent)	53,752	53.23%	
Republican	J. Greene	44,272	43.84%	
Temperance	Henry D. Smith	2,932	2.90%	
Other	Others	27	0.03%	
Majority		7,628		
Turnout				
Democratic hold		Swing		
