= Charles C. Van Zandt =

American politician

Charles Collins Van Zandt
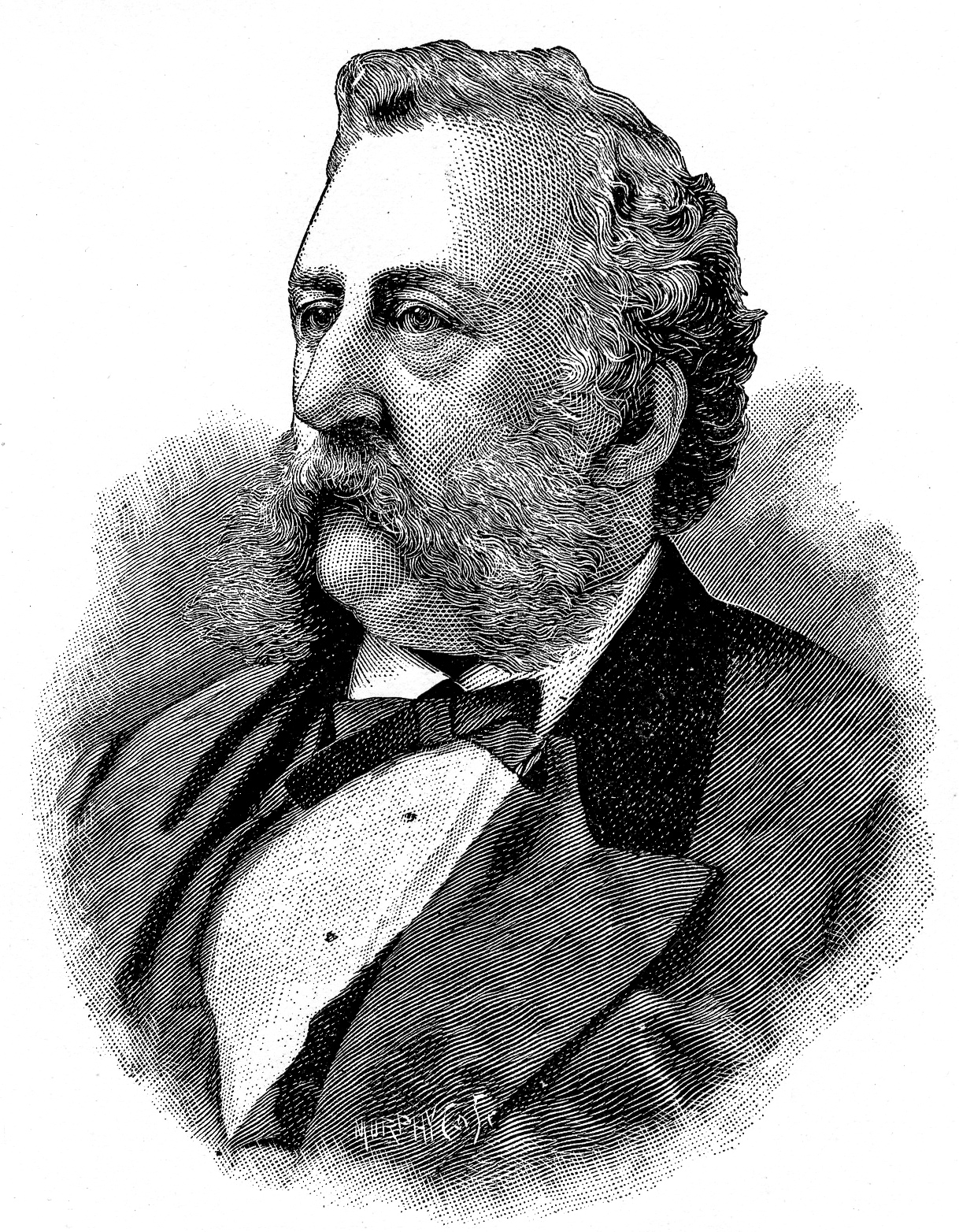

34th Governor of Rhode Island
- In office May 29, 1877 – May 25, 1880
- Lieutenant Governor: Albert Howard
- Preceded by: Henry Lippitt
- Succeeded by: Alfred H. Littlefield

Lieutenant Governor of Rhode Island
- In office 1873–1875
- Governor: Henry Howard
- Preceded by: Charles Cutler
- Succeeded by: Henry Tillinghast Sisson

Member of the Rhode Island Senate
- In office 1869-1870

Personal details
- Born: August 10, 1830 Newport, Rhode Island, U.S.
- Died: June 4, 1894 (aged 63)
- Resting place: Island Cemetery, Newport
- Party: Republican
- Spouse: Arazelia Greene Porter
- Education: Trinity College
- Profession: Lawyer

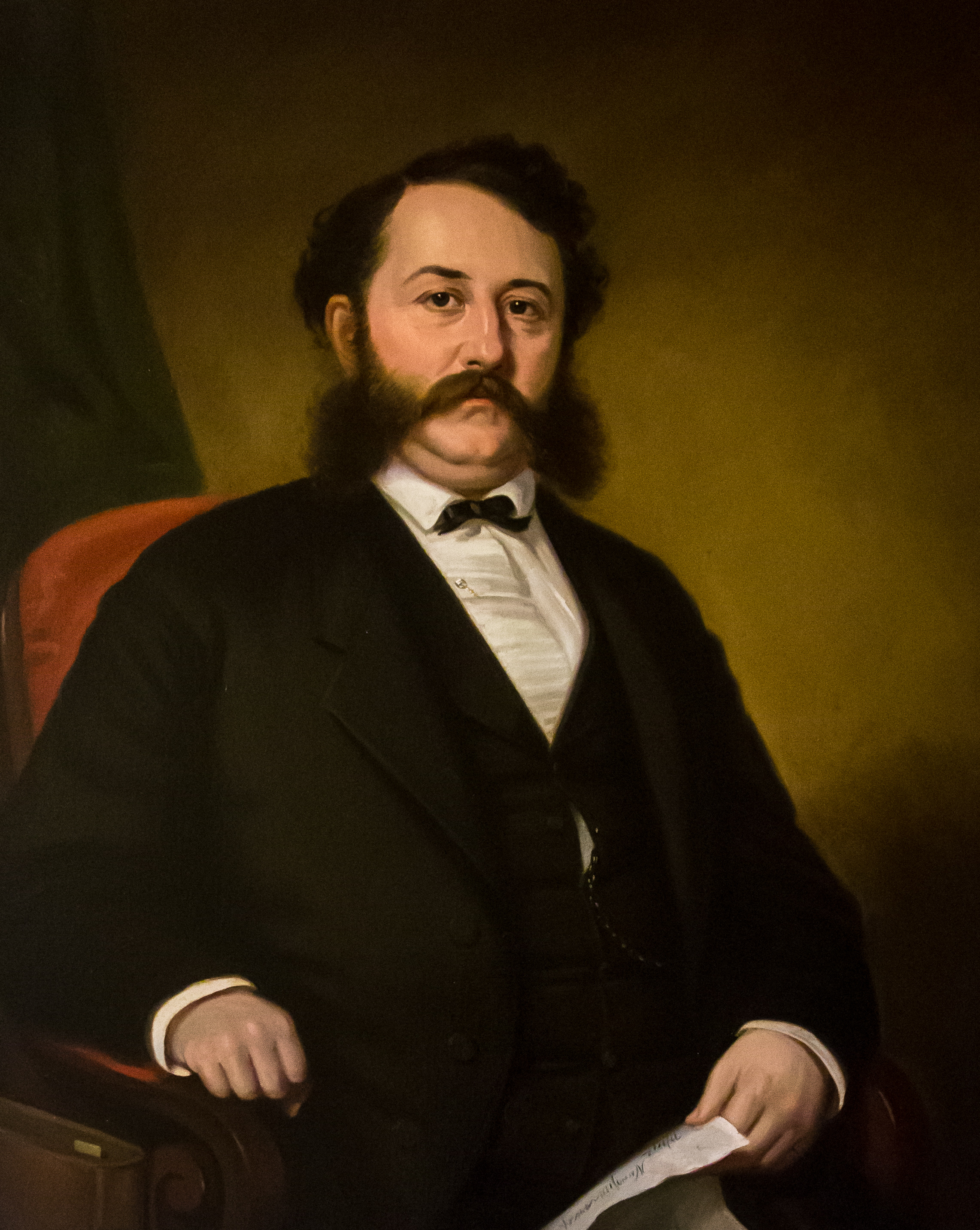
Charles C. Van Zandt.

Charles Collins Van Zandt (August 10, 1830 – June 4, 1894) was the 34th governor of Rhode Island.

== Early life ==
He was born in Newport, Rhode Island on August 10, 1830. He was the son of Edward Van Zandt of New York and Lydia Bradford (née Collins) Van Zandt, a daughter of Lt. Governor Charles Collins.

He graduated from Trinity College in Hartford, Connecticut, class of 1851. He then studied law and was admitted to the bar in 1853.

== Career ==
In 1855, Van Zandt was elected City Solicitor of Newport and was chosen clerk of the Rhode Island House of Representatives. In 1857, he was himself elected to the House. The following year, he became Speaker of the House. He was a State Senator from 1869 to 1870. He was a delegate to Republican National Convention from Rhode Island in 1868, Lieutenant Governor of Rhode Island from 1873 to 1875 serving under Governor Henry Howard, and Governor of Rhode Island from 1877 to 1880.

One of his foremost concerns as a governor was to expand the state's educational system, especially for the literacy needs of the state's large, urban immigrant population.

== Personal life ==
In 1863 he married Arazelia Gray (née Greene) Potter, daughter of the judge and poet Albert Gorton Greene. The widow of Charles Potter of Providence, she was a descendant of Deputy Governor John Greene Jr. and John Greene, an early settler of the Colony of Rhode Island and Providence Plantations who was one of the 12 original proprietors of Providence and a co-founder of the town of Warwick. From her first marriage, she was the mother of Charles Potter III. Together, they lived in an elegant Greek Revival style house on Pelham Street in Newport.

He died in 1894 and was interred at Island Cemetery, Newport, Rhode Island.

Party political offices
Preceded by Henry Lippitt	Republican nominee for Governor of Rhode Island; 1877, 1878, 1879	Succeeded by Alfred H. Littlefield
Political offices
Preceded by Charles Cutler	Lieutenant Governor of Rhode Island; 1873–1875	Succeeded by Henry Tillinghast Sisson
Preceded by Henry Lippitt	Governor of Rhode Island; May 29, 1877 – May 25, 1880	Succeeded by Alfred H. Littlefield
