= April 1876 Connecticut gubernatorial election =

- April 3, 1876
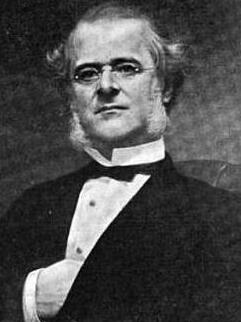

Nominee	Charles R. Ingersoll	H. Robinson
Party	Democratic	Republican
Popular vote	51,138	43,510
Percentage	51.85%	44.12%
- Ingersoll: 40–50% 50–60% 60–70% 70–80% 80–90% Robinson: 40–50% 50–60% 60–70% Tie: 50%
Governor before election
Charles R. Ingersoll
Democratic
Elected Governor
Charles R. Ingersoll
Democratic

The April 1876 Connecticut gubernatorial election was held on April 3, 1876. Incumbent governor and Democratic nominee Charles R. Ingersoll defeated Republican nominee H. Robinson with 51.85% of the vote.

This was the last gubernatorial election held in April, and the only one to elect the governor of Connecticut to a term just short of eight months, from May 7, 1876, to January 3, 1877.

== General election ==
=== Candidates ===
Major party candidates

- Charles R. Ingersoll, Democratic
- H. Robinson, Republican

Other candidates

- Charles Atwater, Greenback
- Henry D. Smith, Prohibition

=== Results ===
April 1876 Connecticut gubernatorial election
Party	Candidate	Votes	%	±%
Democratic	Charles R. Ingersoll (incumbent)	51,138	51.85%	
Republican	H. Robinson	43,510	44.12%	
Greenback	Charles Atwater	1,966	1.99%	
Prohibition	Henry D. Smith	1,945	1.97%	
Other	Others	63	0.06%	
Majority		7,628		
Turnout				
Democratic hold		Swing		
