= 1878 Rhode Island gubernatorial election =

- April 3, 1878
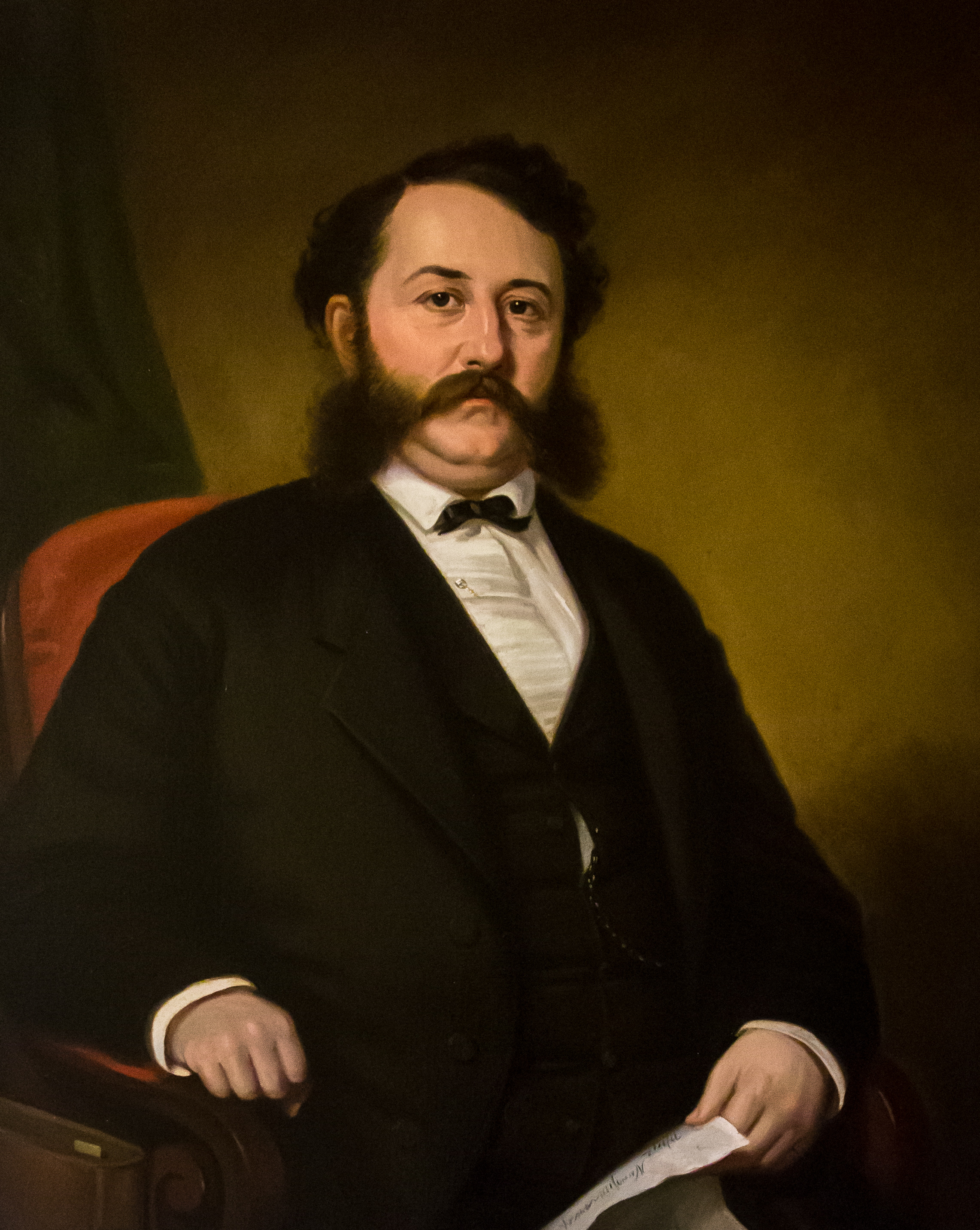

Nominee	Charles C. Van Zandt	Isaac Lawrence
Party	Republican	Democratic
Popular vote	11,454	7,639
Percentage	58.12%	38.76%
- County results Zandt: 50–60% 60–70%
Governor before election
Charles C. Van Zandt
Republican
Elected Governor
Charles C. Van Zandt
Republican

The 1878 Rhode Island gubernatorial election was held on April 3, 1878. Incumbent Republican Charles C. Van Zandt defeated Democratic nominee Isaac Lawrence with 58.12% of the vote.

== General election ==
=== Candidates ===
Major party candidates

- Charles C. Van Zandt, Republican
- Isaac Lawrence, Democratic

Other candidates

- William Foster Jr., Greenback

=== Results ===
1878 Rhode Island gubernatorial election
Party	Candidate	Votes	%	±%
Republican	Charles C. Van Zandt (incumbent)	11,454	58.12%	
Democratic	Isaac Lawrence	7,639	38.76%	
Greenback	William Foster Jr.	590	2.99%	
Majority		3,815		
Turnout				
Republican hold		Swing		
