= 1884 Connecticut gubernatorial election =

- November 4, 1884
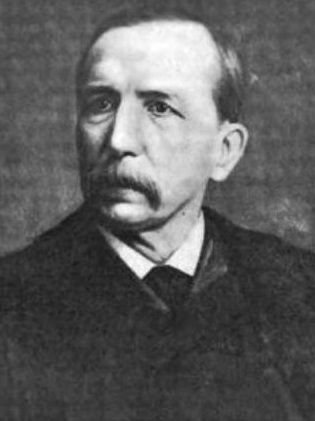

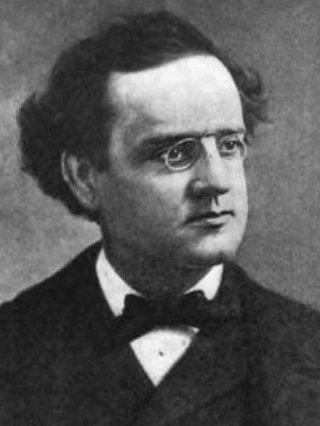
Nominee	Henry Baldwin Harrison	Thomas M. Waller
Party	Republican	Democratic
Popular vote	66,274	67,910
Percentage	48.12%	49.31%
- Harrison: 40–50% 50–60% 60–70% 70–80% Waller: 40–50% 50–60% 60–70% 70–80%
Governor before election
Thomas M. Waller
Democratic
Elected Governor
Henry Baldwin Harrison
Republican

The 1884 Connecticut gubernatorial election was held on November 4, 1884. Republican nominee Henry Baldwin Harrison defeated Democratic incumbent Thomas M. Waller with 48.12% of the vote.

According to the law at the time, if no candidate received a majority, the state legislature would choose between the top two candidates. As the legislature was controlled by Republicans, they voted for fellow Republican Harrison, even though Waller received more votes. Thus, Harrison won the election.

== General election ==
=== Candidates ===
Major party candidates

- Henry Baldwin Harrison, Republican
- Thomas M. Waller, Democratic

Other candidates

- Elisha H. Palmer, Prohibition
- James Langdon Curtis, Greenback

=== Results ===
1884 Connecticut gubernatorial election
Party	Candidate	Votes	%	±%
Democratic	Thomas M. Waller (incumbent)	67,910	49.31%	
Republican	Henry Baldwin Harrison	66,274	48.12%	
Prohibition	Elisha H. Palmer	2,126	1.54%	
Greenback	James Langdon Curtis	1,379	1.00%	
Plurality		1,636		
Turnout				
Republican gain from Democratic		Swing		
