= 1879 Rhode Island gubernatorial election =

- April 2, 1879
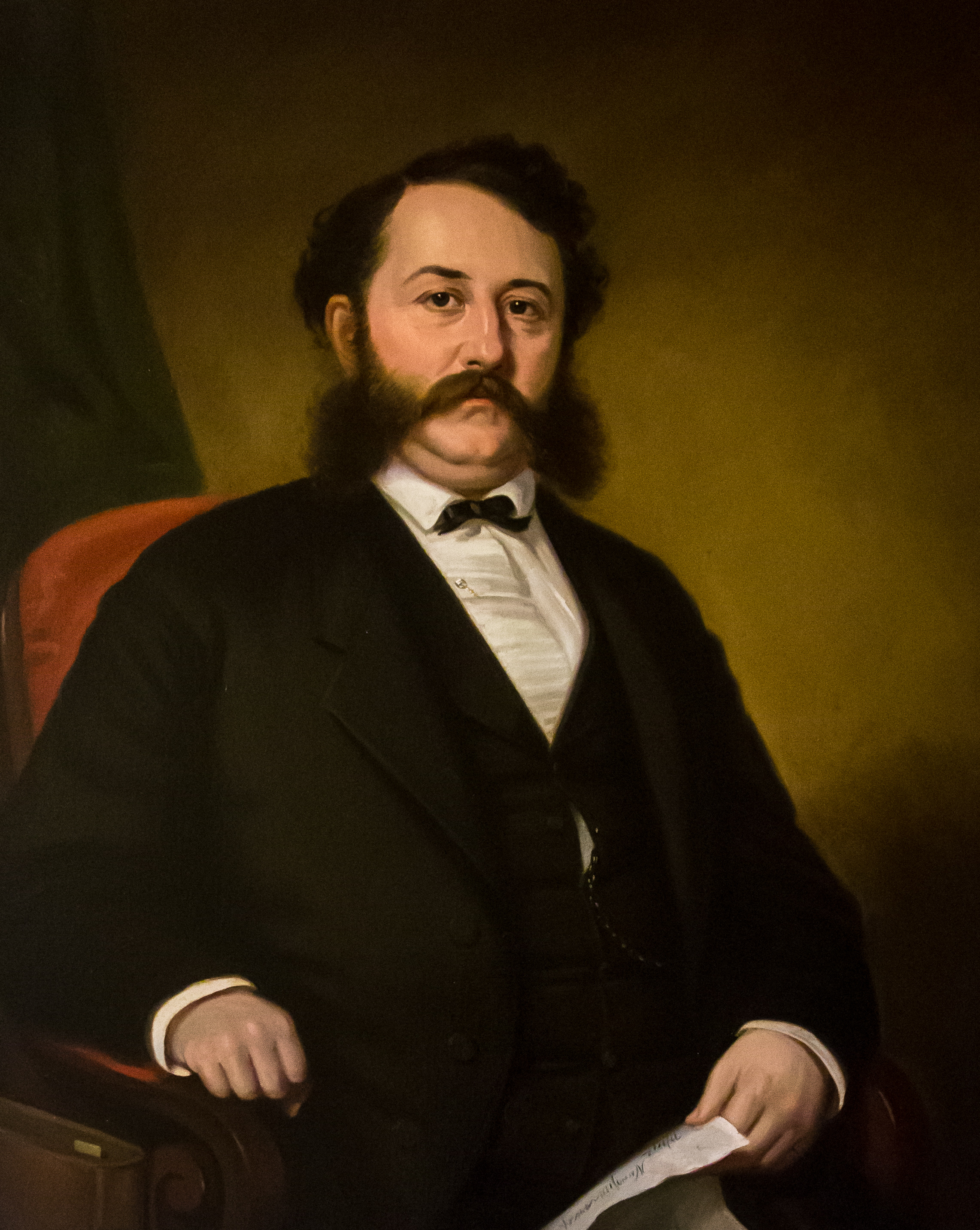

| Nominee | Charles C. Van Zandt | Thomas W. Segar |
| Party | Republican | Democratic |
| Popular vote | 9,717 | 5,506 |
| Percentage | 62.09% | 35.18% |
- County results Zandt: 50–60% 60–70% 70–80% 80–90%
Governor before election
Charles C. Van Zandt
Republican
Elected Governor
Charles C. Van Zandt
Republican

The 1879 Rhode Island gubernatorial election was held on April 2, 1879. Incumbent Republican Charles C. Van Zandt defeated Democratic nominee Thomas W. Segar with 62.09% of the vote.

== General election ==
=== Candidates ===
Major party candidates

- Charles C. Van Zandt, Republican
- Thomas W. Segar, Democratic

Other candidates

- Samuel Hill, Independent

=== Results ===
1879 Rhode Island gubernatorial election
| Party | Candidate | Votes | % | ±% |
|---|---|---|---|---|
| Republican | Charles C. Van Zandt (incumbent) | 9,717 | 62.09% | |
| Democratic | Thomas W. Segar | 5,506 | 35.18% | |
| Greenback | Samuel Hill | 318 | 2.03% | |
| Majority | | 4,211 | | |
| Turnout | | | | |
| Republican hold | | Swing | | |
