= 1882 Rhode Island gubernatorial election =

- April 5, 1882
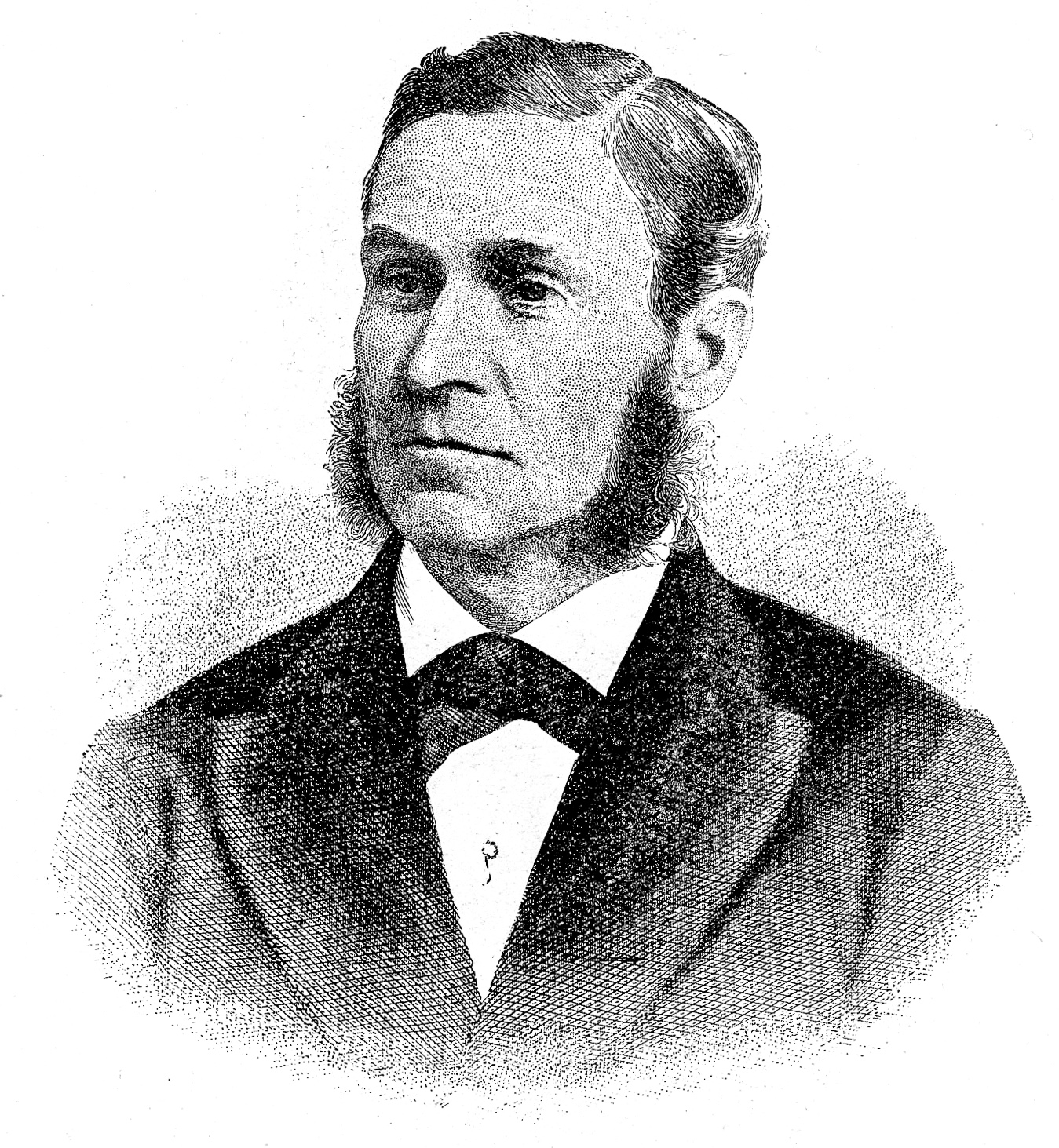

Nominee	Alfred H. Littlefield	Horace A. Kimball
Party	Republican	Democratic
Popular vote	10,056	5,311
Percentage	64.78%	34.21%
- County results Littlefield: 60–70% 70–80%
Governor before election
Alfred H. Littlefield
Republican
Elected Governor
Alfred H. Littlefield
Republican

The 1882 Rhode Island gubernatorial election was held on April 5, 1882. Incumbent Republican Alfred H. Littlefield defeated Democratic nominee Horace A. Kimball with 64.78% of the vote.

== General election ==
=== Candidates ===
Major party candidates

- Alfred H. Littlefield, Republican
- Horace A. Kimball, Democratic

Other candidates

- Charles P. Adams, Greenback

=== Results ===
1882 Rhode Island gubernatorial election
Party	Candidate	Votes	%	±%
Republican	Alfred H. Littlefield (incumbent)	10,056	64.78%	
Democratic	Horace A. Kimball	5,311	34.21%	
Greenback	Charles P. Adams	120	0.77%	
Majority		4,745		
Turnout				
Republican hold		Swing		
