= Charles Roberts Ingersoll =

American politician (1821–1903)

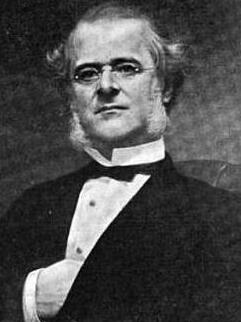

47th Governor of Connecticut
- In office May 7, 1873 – January 3, 1877
- Lieutenant: George G. Sill
- Preceded by: Marshall Jewell
- Succeeded by: Richard D. Hubbard

Personal details
- Born: September 16, 1821 New Haven, Connecticut
- Died: January 25, 1903 (aged 81) New Haven, Connecticut
- Party: Democratic
- Spouse: Virginia Gregory Ingersoll
- Children: Elizabeth Ingersoll Haven
- Education: Yale College
- Profession: lawyer, politician

Charles Roberts Ingersoll (September 16, 1821 – January 25, 1903) was an American lawyer and the 47th governor of Connecticut from 1873 to 1877.

== Early life ==
Ingersoll was born in New Haven, Connecticut, son of Ralph Isaacs Ingersoll, a New Haven lawyer who also served in the state House of Representatives, the United States Congress, and as United States Minister to Russia and as the mayor of New Haven, and of his wife, Margaret, née Van den Heuvel.

His paternal grandfather was Jonathan Ingersoll, a judge of the Supreme Court and Lieutenant Governor of Connecticut up until his death in 1823. His maternal grandfather was Jan Cornelis Van den Heuvel, a Dutch born plantation owner and politician who served as governor of the Dutch province of Demerara from 1765 to 1770 and later became a merchant in New York City with the Dutch West India Company.

He graduated from Yale College at the age of nineteen in 1840. He visited Europe aboard the United States frigate Preble, commanded by his uncle, Captain Voorhes, for two years, and returned to Yale Law School, graduating in 1844.

== Career ==
Ingersoll was admitted to the bar in 1845 and became the law partner of his father, and served as director of the New Haven Colony Historical Society. Ingersoll entered politics in 1846, serving as clerk of the Connecticut Assembly, a position he was reelected to in 1856, 1857, 1858, 1866, and 1871. He was a delegate to the Democratic National Convention from Connecticut in 1864. He served in the state legislature as a Democrat.

Winning the 1873 Democratic gubernatorial nomination, Ingersoll was elected Governor of Connecticut in April 1873. He was reelected in 1874, 1875 and April 1876, serving from May 7, 1873 to January 3, 1877. During his tenure, a state constitutional amendment was passed that lengthened the governor's term to two years. Also, the state endured a financial depression that took six years to recover from, and Hartford—which was a co-capital with New Haven—was finally chosen as the sole lawmaking center. Ingersoll did not run for reelection, and left office January 1877.

He continued to practice law, trying cases on the state and federal levels and in the U.S. Supreme Court. He also was an organizer and vice president of the State Bar Association.

== Personal life ==
Ingersoll was married to Virginia Gregory, the daughter of Admiral Francis Hoyt Gregory. They had six children. A daughter, Elizabeth, married George G. Haven, Jr.

Ingersoll died January 25, 1903 (age 81 years, 131 days), in New Haven and is interred at Grove Street Cemetery, New Haven, Connecticut.

Party political offices
Preceded by Richard D. Hubbard	Democratic nominee for Governor of Connecticut; 1873, 1874, 1875, 1876	Succeeded by Richard D. Hubbard
Political offices
Preceded by Marshall Jewell	Governor of Connecticut; 1873-1877	Succeeded by Richard D. Hubbard
