= 1881 Rhode Island gubernatorial election =

- April 6, 1881
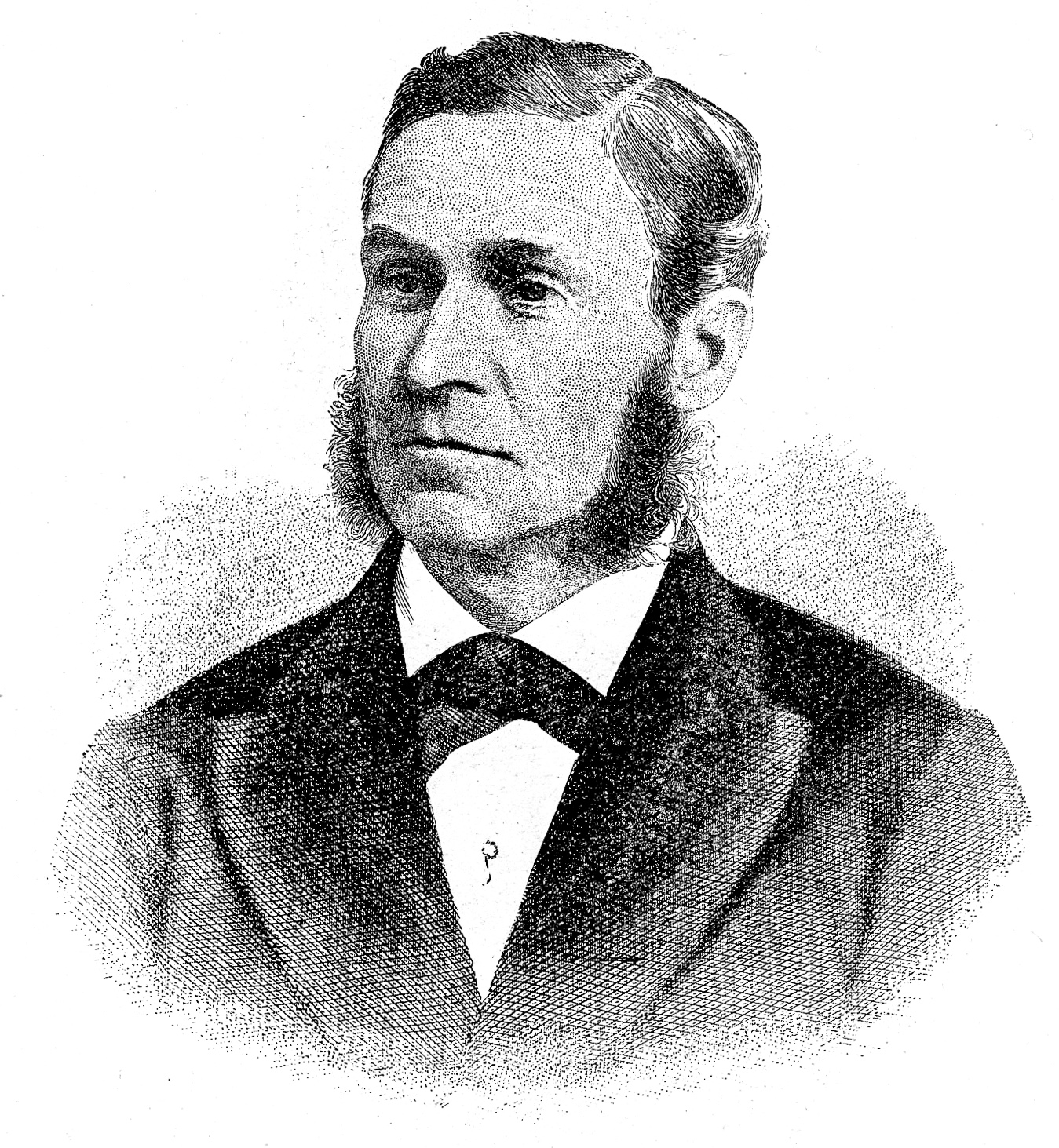

Nominee	Alfred H. Littlefield	Horace A. Kimball
Party	Republican	Democratic
Popular vote	10,849	4,756
Percentage	66.97%	29.36%
- County results Littlefield: 60–70% 70–80% 80–90%
Governor before election
Alfred H. Littlefield
Republican
Elected Governor
Alfred H. Littlefield
Republican

The 1881 Rhode Island gubernatorial election was held on April 6, 1881. Incumbent Republican Alfred H. Littlefield defeated Democratic nominee Horace A. Kimball with 66.97% of the vote.

== General election ==
=== Candidates ===
Major party candidates

- Alfred H. Littlefield, Republican
- Horace A. Kimball, Democratic

Other candidates

- Charles P. Adams, Greenback
- Frank G. Allen, Prohibition

=== Results ===
1881 Rhode Island gubernatorial election
Party	Candidate	Votes	%	±%
Republican	Alfred H. Littlefield (incumbent)	10,849	66.97%	
Democratic	Horace A. Kimball	4,756	29.36%	
Greenback	Charles P. Adams	285	1.76%	
Prohibition	Frank G. Allen	253	1.56%	
Majority		6,093		
Turnout				
Republican hold		Swing		
