= Alfred H. Littlefield =

American businessman and politician (1829–1893)

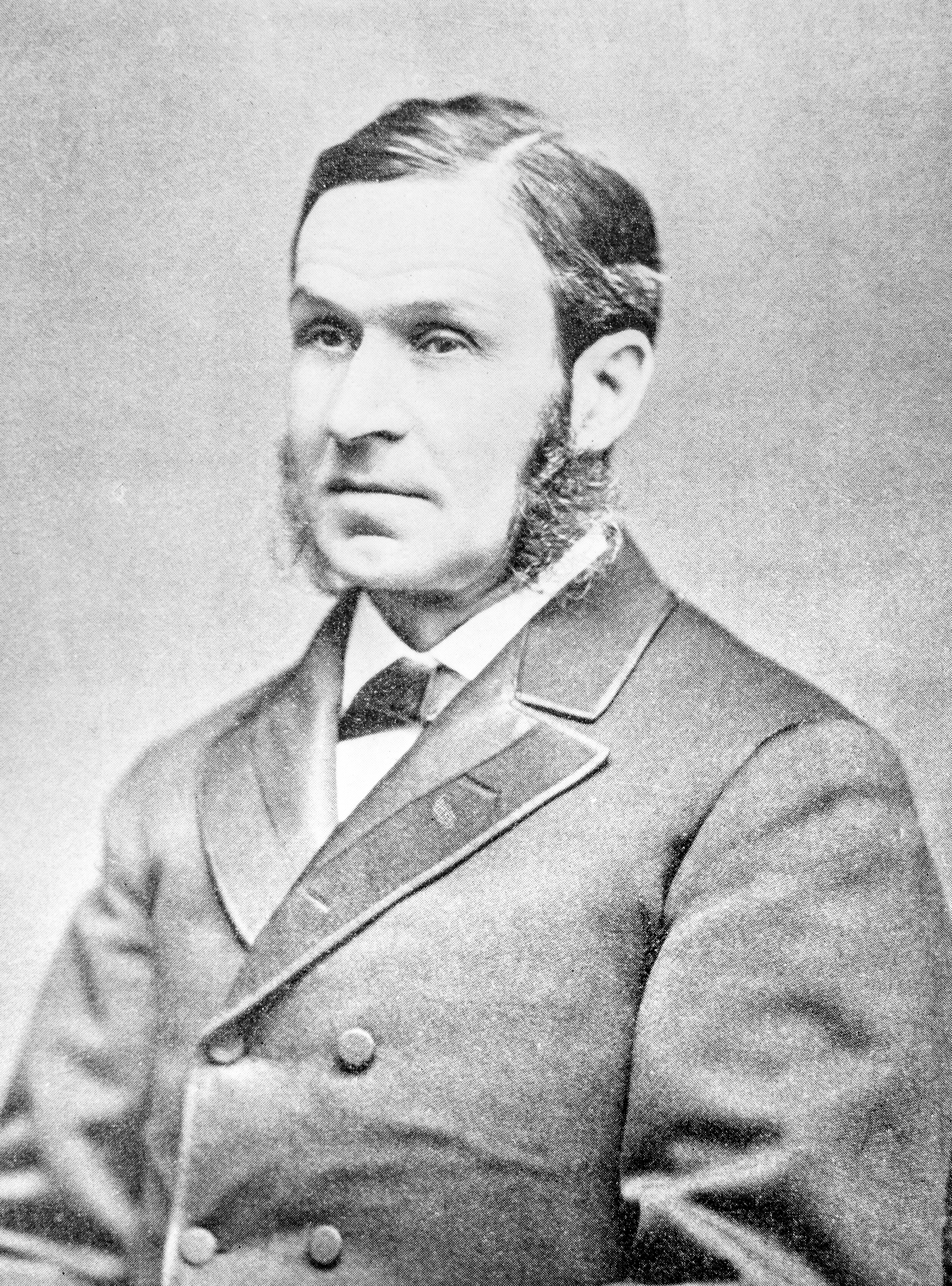

35th Governor of Rhode Island
- In office May 25, 1880 – May 29, 1883
- Lieutenant: Henry Fay
- Preceded by: Charles C. Van Zandt
- Succeeded by: Augustus O. Bourn

Member of the Rhode Island Senate
- In office 1878–1879

Member of the Rhode Island House of Representatives
- In office 1876–1877

Personal details
- Born: April 2, 1829 Scituate, Rhode Island, U.S.
- Died: December 21, 1893 (aged 64) Central Falls, Rhode Island, U.S.
- Resting place: Swan Point Cemetery; Providence, Rhode Island
- Party: Whig; Republican
- Spouse: Rebecca Jane (Northrup) Littlefield
- Relations: Daniel Littlefield (brother); George L. Littlefield (brother)
- Children: Ebenezer N. Littlefield; Minnie J. Littlefield; George H. Littlefield; Alfred H. Littlefield
- Parent(s): John Littlefield; Deborah (Himes) Littlefield
- Profession: Businessman; Politician

Alfred Henry Littlefield (April 2, 1829 – December 21, 1893) was an American businessman and politician. He was a member of the Rhode Island House of Representatives and the Rhode Island Senate, and was the 35th governor of Rhode Island.

== Early life ==
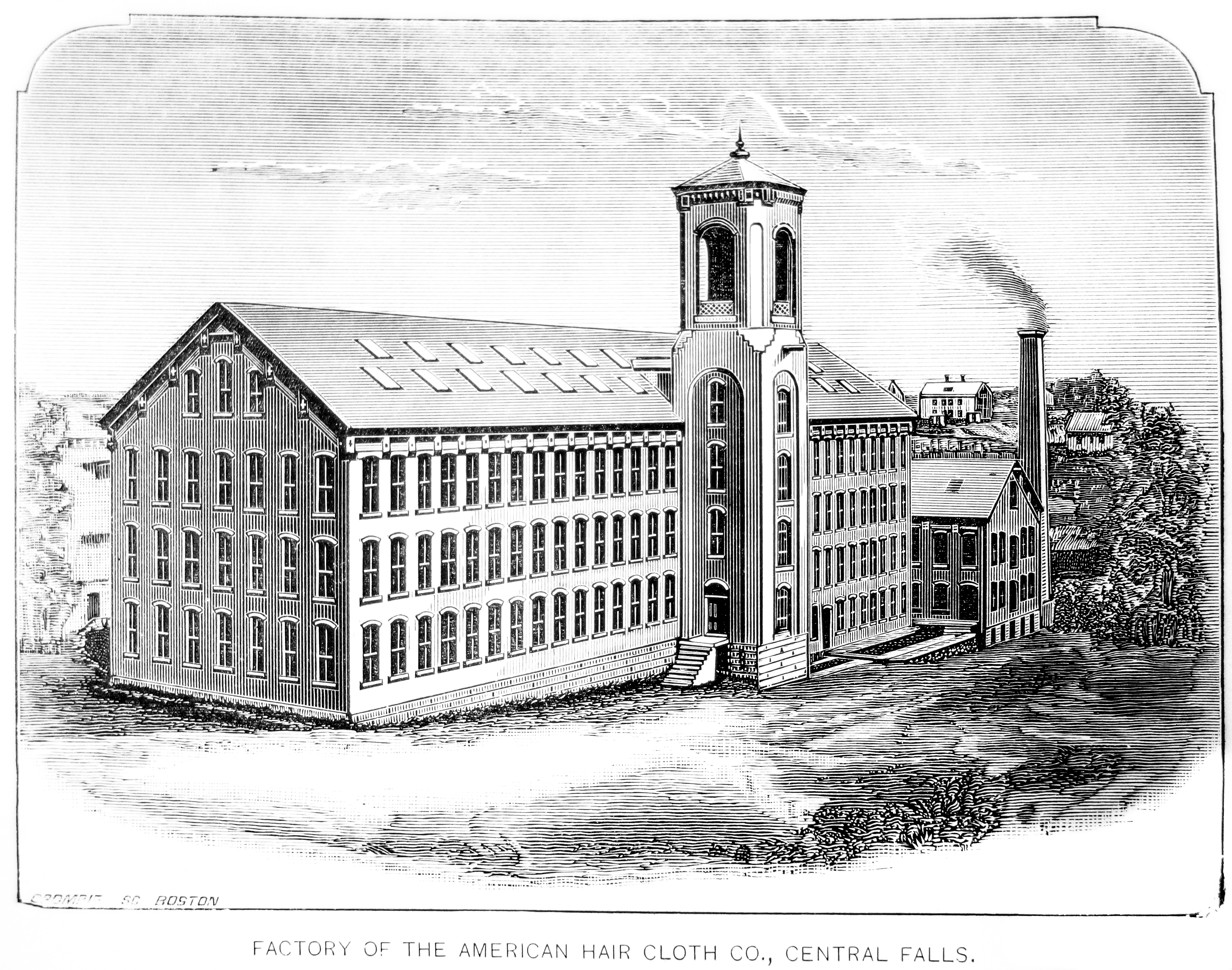
Pawtucket Hair Cloth Company

Littlefield was born in Scituate, Providence County, Rhode Island, on April 12, 1829. In 1831, his family moved to Warwick, Rhode Island, where he attended the common schools. He worked at a dry goods store in Central Falls, Rhode Island, before working at the Littlefield Manufacturing Company. He became a partner in the company, eventually serving as president. He helped found the Pawtucket Hair Cloth Company in 1861 with his brother Daniel, and served as director until his death.

In 1864, he served as the division inspector of the Rhode Island Militia, and was promoted to colonel. He served in the militia for five years.

== Political career ==
Littlefield began his political career as a member of the Lincoln Town Council in 1873, and was reelected to that office four times. He was a member of the Rhode Island House of Representatives in 1876 and 1877, and served in the Rhode Island Senate in 1878 and 1879.

He was elected as Republican candidate to the governor's office, serving as the 35th Governor of Rhode Island from May 25, 1880, to May 29, 1883. He succeeded fellow Republican Charles C. Van Zandt, who did not run for re-election in 1880. Littlefield beat the Democratic candidate Horace A. Kimball by 10,224 votes against 7,440, with 5,047 votes going to the Prohibition candidate Albert C. Howard. Republican Henry H. Fay became Lieutenant Governor.

During his administration, the boundary line between Rhode Island and Massachusetts was established. He was succeeded May 29, 1883, by fellow Republican Augustus O. Bourn.

After leaving the governorship. Littlefield returned to his business interests. He was president of the First National Bank of Pawtucket, the Pawtucket Gas Company and the Pawtucket Street Railway in Pawtucket.

== Death ==
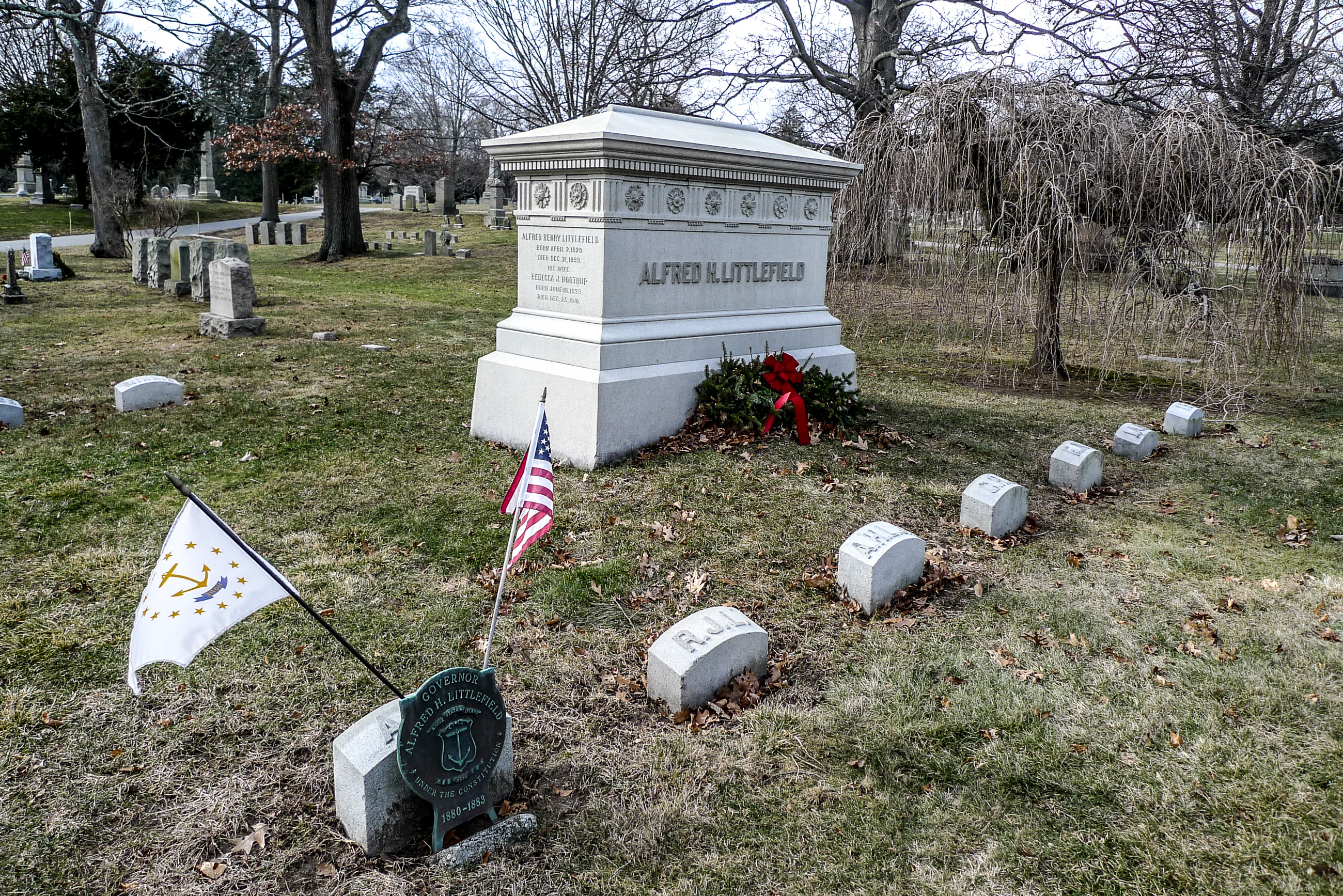
Grave at Swan Point Cemetery

He died on December 21, 1893, at his home in Central Falls, Rhode Island. He is interred at Swan Point Cemetery, Providence, Rhode Island.

== Family life ==
Littlefield was the son of John and Deborah (Himes) Littlefield. On February 9, 1853, Littlefield married Rebecca Jane Northrup. They had four children: Ebenezer N. Littlefield, Minnie J. Littlefield, George H. Littlefield and Alfred H. Littlefield.

Party political offices
Preceded by Charles C. Van Zandt	Republican nominee for Governor of Rhode Island; 1880, 1881, 1882	Succeeded by Augustus O. Bourn
Political offices
Preceded by Charles C. Van Zandt	Governor of Rhode Island; 1880-1883	Succeeded by Augustus O. Bourn
