= 1873 Connecticut gubernatorial election =

- April 7, 1873
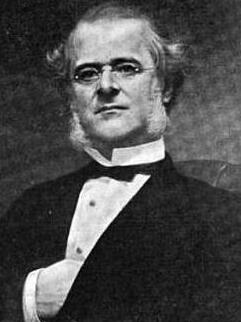

Nominee	Charles R. Ingersoll	Henry P. Haven
Party	Democratic	Republican
Popular vote	45,060	39,245
Percentage	51.86%	45.17%
- Ingersoll: 40–50% 50–60% 60–70% 70–80% Haven: 40–50% 50–60% 60–70% 70–80%
Governor before election
Marshall Jewell
Republican
Elected Governor
Charles R. Ingersoll
Democratic

The 1873 Connecticut gubernatorial election was held on April 7, 1873. Former state legislator and Democratic nominee Charles R. Ingersoll defeated Republican nominee Henry P. Haven with 51.86% of the vote.

== General election ==
=== Candidates ===
Major party candidates

- Charles R. Ingersoll, Democratic
- Henry P. Haven, Republican

Other candidates

- Henry D. Smith, Temperance

=== Results ===
1873 Connecticut gubernatorial election
Party	Candidate	Votes	%	±%
Democratic	Charles R. Ingersoll	45,060	51.86%	
Republican	Henry P. Haven	39,245	45.17%	
Temperance Party	Henry D. Smith	2,541	2.93%	
Other	Others	36	0.04%	
Majority		5,815		
Turnout				
Democratic gain from Republican		Swing		
