= 1880 Connecticut gubernatorial election =

- November 2, 1880
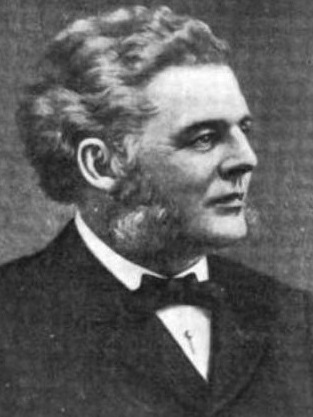

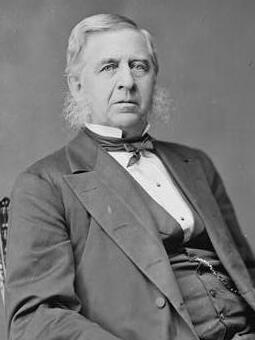
Nominee	Hobart B. Bigelow	James E. English
Party	Republican	Democratic
Popular vote	67,070	64,293
Percentage	50.52%	48.43%
- Bigelow: 40–50% 50–60% 60–70% 70–80% English: 40–50% 50–60% 60–70% 70–80%
Governor before election
Charles B. Andrews
Republican
Elected Governor
Hobart B. Bigelow
Republican

The 1880 Connecticut gubernatorial election was held on November 2, 1880. Republican nominee Hobart B. Bigelow defeated Democratic nominee James E. English with 50.52% of the vote.

== General election ==
=== Candidates ===
Major party candidates

- Hobart B. Bigelow, Republican
- James E. English, Democratic

Other candidates

- Henry C. Baldwin, Greenback
- George Rogers, Prohibition

=== Results ===
1880 Connecticut gubernatorial election
Party	Candidate	Votes	%	±%
Republican	Hobart B. Bigelow	67,070	50.52%	
Democratic	James E. English	64,293	48.43%	
Greenback	Henry C. Baldwin	897	0.68%	
Prohibition	George Rogers	488	0.37%	
Majority		2,777		
Turnout				
Republican hold		Swing		
