= Hobart B. Bigelow =

American politician (1834–1891)

Hobart Baldwin Bigelow
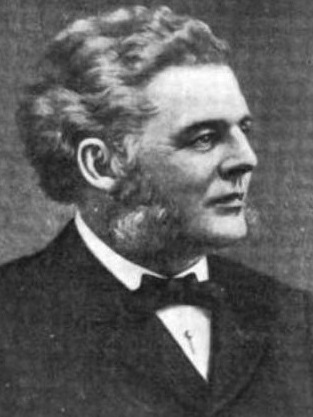

50th Governor of Connecticut
- In office January 5, 1881 – January 3, 1883
- Lieutenant: William H. Bulkeley
- Preceded by: Charles B. Andrews
- Succeeded by: Thomas M. Waller

Member of the Connecticut House of Representatives
- In office 1875

Personal details
- Born: May 16, 1834 North Haven, Connecticut, U.S.
- Died: October 12, 1891 (aged 57) New Haven, Connecticut, U.S.
- Party: Republican
- Spouse: Eleanor Lewis Bigelow
- Children: 4
- Profession: Manufacturer, politician

Hobart Baldwin Bigelow (May 16, 1834 – October 12, 1891) was an American politician and the 50th governor of Connecticut.

== Biography ==
Bigelow was born in North Haven, New Haven County, Connecticut, on May 16, 1834. He was educated in the South Egremont Academy in Sheffield, Massachusetts. On May 6, 1857, he married Eleanor Lewis and they had four children: Frank Lewis, Eleanor Mary, Walter Pierpont, and Philo Lewis, who died at two weeks.

== Career ==
In 1851 Bigelow left there and afterward learned the machinist's trade at Guilford, Connecticut, with local companies. He became a leading manufacturer of boilers and heavy machinery. He purchased the Bigelow Manufacturing Company in 1861, which later conducted business under the name of the H.B. Bigelow & Co. He served as the company's president for life.

Bigelow served as councilman of New Haven from 1863 to 1876. He then served as mayor of New Haven from 1879 to 1881. He also served as a member of the Connecticut House of Representatives in 1875.

Bigelow was the Republican nominee and was elected the governor of Connecticut on November 2, 1880. He was sworn into office on January 5, 1881. During his term, legislation was enacted that disallowed deceptive election registration procedures and a bill was constituted that regulated companies of 12 or more employees to install fire escapes. The Storrs Agricultural School was founded and assessments were cut back on mutual life insurance companies.

Bigelow left office on January 3, 1883, and retired from public service. He was a delegate to Republican National Convention from Connecticut, 1880.

== Death ==
On October 12, 1891, Bigelow died at the New Haven House hotel, aged 57. He is interred at Evergreen Cemetery, New Haven, Connecticut.

Party political offices
Preceded by Charles B. Andrews	Republican nominee for Governor of Connecticut; 1880	Succeeded by Morgan Bulkeley
Political offices
Preceded by Charles B. Andrews	Governor of Connecticut; 1881–1883	Succeeded by Thomas M. Waller
