= English's Opera House =

Former theatre in Indianapolis, Indiana, U.S.

Coordinates: 39.769°N 86.159°W

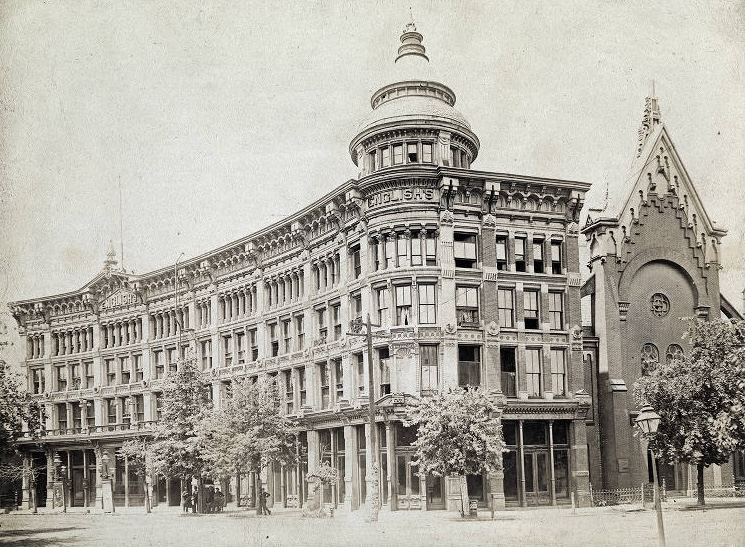
1889 photograph of English's Opera House (left) and Plymouth Church (right)

English's Opera House, also known as English's Theatre, was a theatre located in downtown Indianapolis, Indiana at Monument Circle. It was built by William Hayden English and opened in 1880. It was modeled after the Grand Opera House in Manhattan. It was demolished in 1949.

The theatre was host to the 1884 Greenback National Convention.
