= 1884 Greenback National Convention =

American political convention

- 1884 presidential election
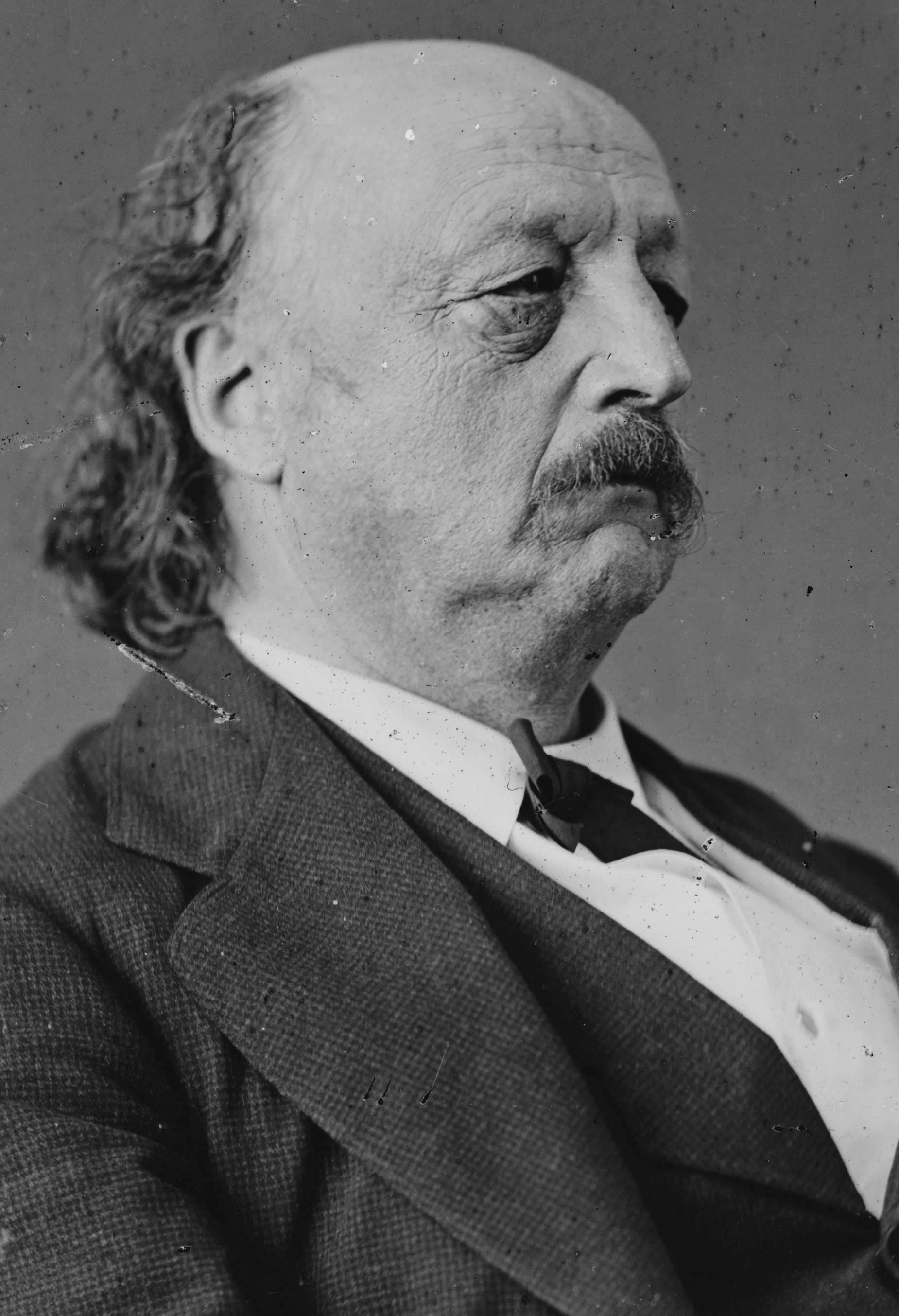
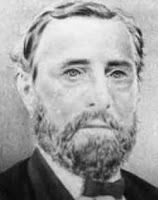
- Nominees; Butler and West

Convention
- Date(s): May 28–29, 1884
- City: Indianapolis, Indiana
- Venue: English's Opera House

Candidates
- Presidential nominee: Benjamin F. Butler of Massachusetts
- Vice-presidential nominee: Absolom M. West of Mississippi

The 1884 Greenback Party National Convention assembled in English's Opera House in Indianapolis, Indiana. Delegates from 28 states and the District of Columbia were in attendance. The convention nominated Benjamin F. Butler for president over Party Chairman Jesse Harper on the first ballot. Absolom M. West was nominated unanimously for vice-president, and subsequently was also endorsed by the Anti-Monopoly Party.

Greenback candidates:

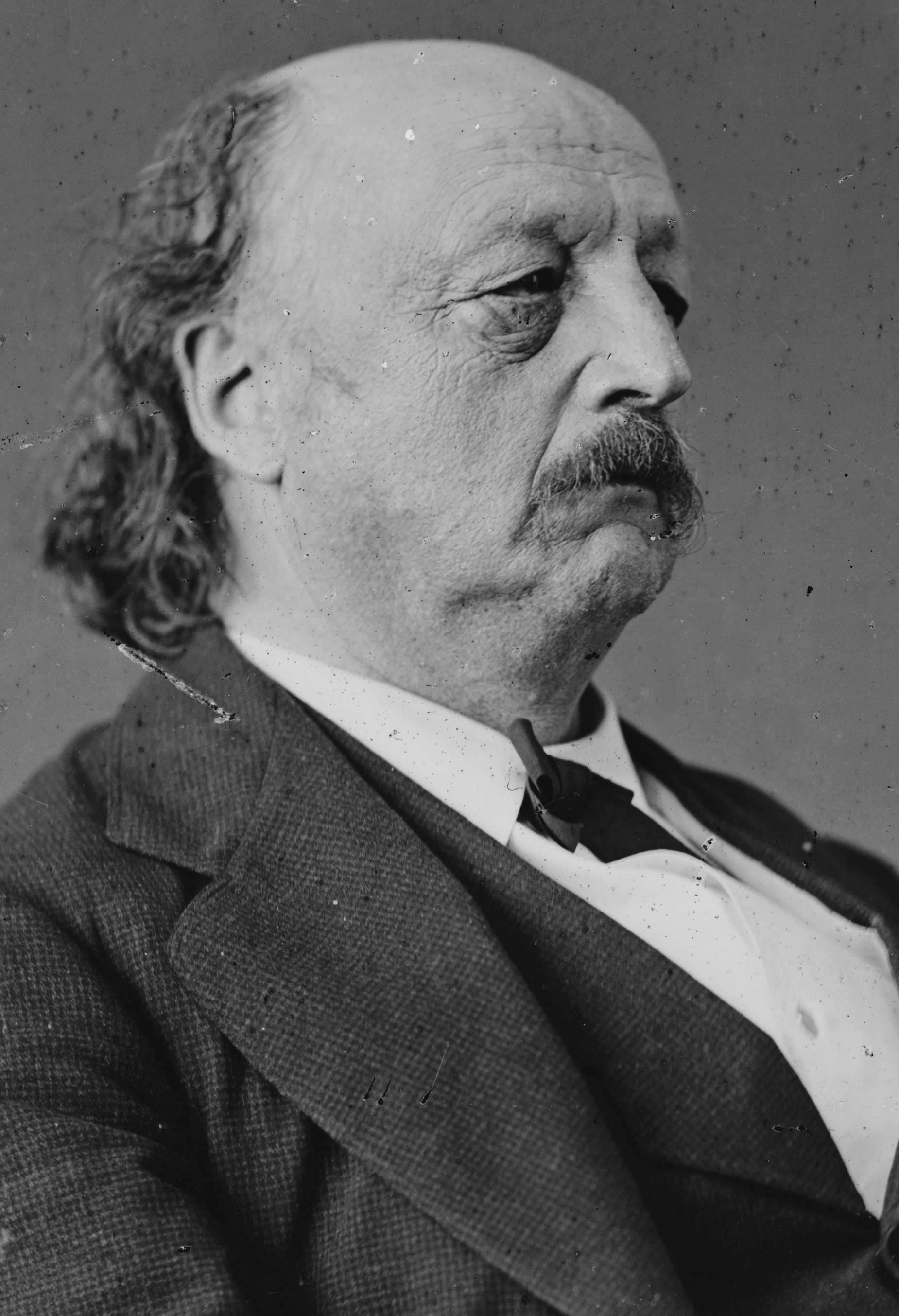
Former Governor Benjamin F. Butler of Massachusetts

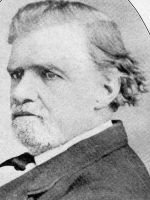
Party Chairman Jesse Harper of Illinois

Butler had initially hoped to form a number of fusion slates with the "minority party" in each state, Democratic or Republican, and for his supporters of various parties to come together under a single "People's Party". Many in the two major parties however, while maybe agreeing with Butler's message and platform, were unwilling to place their support beyond the party line. In a number of places, Iowa in particular, fusion slates were nominated; essentially, Butler's and Cleveland's votes would both be added together for the total vote of the fusion slate, allowing them to carry the state even if neither were to carry a plurality, with the electoral vote being divided according to the percentage of the vote each party net.

Even if Fusion were carried out in every state in which it were considered possible (Indiana, Nebraska, Wisconsin, Illinois), it would not have changed the result, none of the states flipping from Blaine to Cleveland, with Butler winning a single electoral vote from Indiana.

Presidential Ballot
Ballot	1st
Benjamin F. Butler	323
Jesse Harper	98
Edward P. Allis	2
Solon Chase	2
David Davis	1

Source: US President - G Convention. Our Campaigns. (February 11, 2012).
