= Thomas M. Waller =

American politician (1839–1924)

Thomas MacDonald Waller
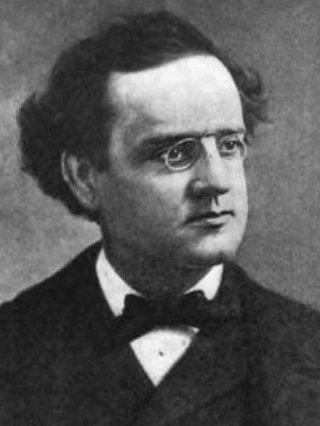

51st Governor of Connecticut
- In office January 3, 1883 – January 8, 1885
- Lieutenant: George G. Sumner
- Preceded by: Hobart B. Bigelow
- Succeeded by: Henry Baldwin Harrison

Secretary of State of Connecticut
- In office 1870-1871
- Governor: James E. English
- Preceded by: Hiram Appleman
- Succeeded by: Hiram Appleman

Member of the Connecticut House of Representatives
- In office 1876; 1872; 1867

Personal details
- Born: February 15, 1839 New York City, U.S.
- Died: January 25, 1924 (aged 84) New London, Connecticut, U.S.
- Party: Democratic
- Spouse: Charlotte Bishop
- Children: 6
- Profession: Lawyer, politician

Thomas MacDonald Waller (February 15, 1839 – January 25, 1924) was an American attorney, politician and the 51st governor of Connecticut.

== Biography ==
Waller was born in New York City on February 15, 1839, the son of Irish immigrant parents. His father's name was Thomas Armstrong, and his parents died before he turned eight. He earned a living by selling newspapers and working as a cabin boy, and was considering going to California during the gold rush of 1849, when a New London man named Robert Waller offered to provide him a home and an education in Connecticut. Waller accepted his offer, was adopted by the elder Waller, and received an education in the New London schools, where he was noted for his skills in public speaking. In 1859 he married Charlotte Bishop and they had six children.

== Career ==
After his graduation from Bartlett High School, he studied law and he gained admission to the bar in 1861, the same year that the Civil War began. He enlisted in the Second Connecticut Volunteers in April; due to an eye disease he was discharged two months later. Using his oratory talents to recruit volunteers for the Union, and his work in arguing cases in court, drew attention to his speaking ability.

He served in the Connecticut House of Representatives in 1867, 1872, and 1876, and was Speaker in 1876. He also served as Secretary of the State of Connecticut from 1870 to 1871, and mayor of New London, Connecticut, from 1873 to 1879.

In 1882 Waller ran for governor on the Democratic ticket and defeated William Bulkeley (brother of future governor Morgan Bulkeley) by more than 4,000 votes. He served from January 3, 1883, to January 8, 1885. In 1884 Waller sought reelection and received more votes than his Republican opponent, Henry Baldwin Harrison, but it was less than the 50% majority required by law; the choice fell to the state legislature, which was controlled by Republicans, and they selected Harrison. As Governor, Waller was notable for his support of civil rights legislation on the state level, helping trigger a shift in the Connecticut Democratic Party.

Waller gained attention at the 1884 Democratic National Convention when he made the seconding speech nominating Thomas A. Hendricks for vice president on the ticket with presidential nominee Grover Cleveland. Cleveland and Hendricks won, and the following year Cleveland appointed Waller as Consul-General in London, where he served from 1885 to 1889.

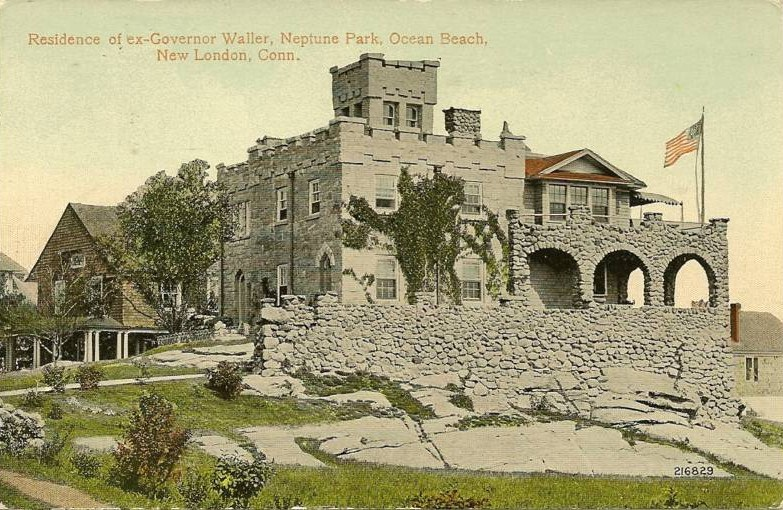
Waller's home, "Neptune Park" in the Ocean Beach section of New London, Connecticut (from a 1910 postcard)

When Waller returned to New London in 1889, he opened law offices there and in New York City. "I work five days a week in New York," he once said in jest, "that I may live two in Connecticut." In 1893 he served on the commission for the World's Columbian Exposition in Chicago. At the 1896 Democratic National Convention, he was an articulate spokesman for the gold faction supporting Cleveland's policies and opposing William Jennings Bryan. He campaigned hard for the Gold Democratic ticket headed by John M. Palmer of Illinois. Waller also served as a delegate to Connecticut's 1902 Constitutional Convention.

== Death ==
Waller died on January 25, 1924, at his Ocean Beach home in New London. He is interred at Cedar Grove Cemetery in New London, Connecticut. Waller Street in New London is named after him.

Party political offices
Preceded by James E. English	Democratic nominee for Governor of Connecticut; 1882, 1884	Succeeded by Edward S. Cleveland
Political offices
Preceded by Hobart B. Bigelow	Governor of Connecticut; 1883–1885	Succeeded by Henry B. Harrison
