= Charles W. Roberts =

American colonel (1828–1898)

Charles Wentworth Roberts (1828–1898) was a colonel in the Union Army during the American Civil War, who was awarded the rank of brevet brigadier general, United States Volunteers, in 1866, to rank from March 13, 1865. He was born in Old Town, Maine, and graduated from Bowdoin College, but lived most of his life in nearby Bangor, Maine. He was the son of prominent local lumber merchant Amos M. Roberts. His father was the wealthiest man in Bangor according to the 1840 census. Roberts enlisted as lieutenant colonel of the 2nd Maine Volunteer Infantry Regiment in 1861, the first unit to leave Maine in response to President Abraham Lincoln's call for volunteers to suppress the rebellion after the fall of Fort Sumter. With the promotion of the regiment's colonel Charles Davis Jameson, USV, to brigadier general, Roberts became colonel of the regiment. Roberts had a horse shot out from under him at the Second Battle of Bull Run, when he commanded the 1st Brigade while General John H. Martindale suffered from typhoid fever. Roberts retired due to ill health in 1863 and was succeeded on January 10, 1863, by Colonel George Varney. Then Lieutenant Colonel Varney had led the regiment at the Battle of Fredericksburg on December 13, 1862, where he received a head wound from a shell fragment. President Andrew Johnson nominated Colonel Roberts for the award of the grade of brevet brigadier general, United States Volunteers, on February 24, 1866, and the brevet was confirmed by the U. S. Senate on April 10, 1866, to rank from March 13, 1865.

The Roberts family of Bangor were prominent War Democrats, rather than members of the Republican Party establishment led locally by Vice President Hannibal Hamlin. It is thus possible that Robert's resignation from the regiment had as much to do with politics as health.

After the war Roberts built a prominent Second Empire-style house on State St. in Bangor, which, along with his father's similarly-styled house next door, is listed on the National Register of Historic Places. Roberts was the Democratic Party candidate for governor of Maine in 1875, but lost to another former Civil War general, Republican Seldon Connor. Roberts' sister Fannie married U.S. Congressman John A. Peters, a Bangor Democrat who later joined the Republican Party.

Roberts is one of eight civil war generals buried at Mount Hope Cemetery in Bangor.

== Notes ==
Party political offices
Preceded by Franklin Smith	Democratic nominee for Governor of Maine; 1870	Succeeded by Charles P. Kimball
Preceded by Joseph Titcomb	Democratic nominee for Governor of Maine; 1875	Succeeded by John C. Talbot
