= 1875 Maine gubernatorial election =

- September 13, 1875
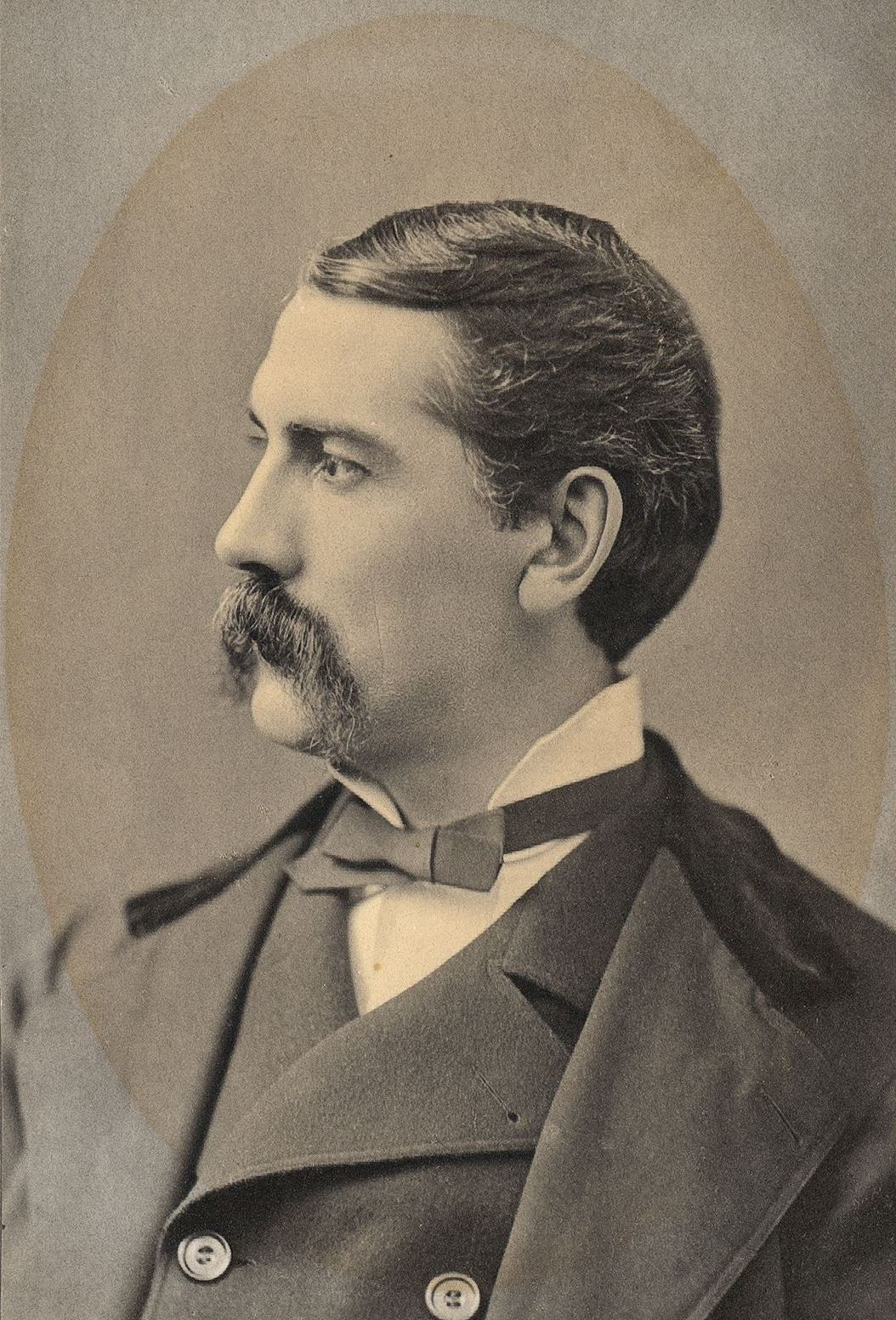

Nominee	Seldon Connor	Charles W. Roberts
Party	Republican	Democratic
Popular vote	57,812	52,807
Percentage	51.77%	48.19%
- County results Connor: 50–60% 60–70% Roberts: 50–60%
Governor before election
Nelson Dingley Jr.
Republican
Elected Governor
Seldon Connor
Republican

The 1875 Maine gubernatorial election was held on September 13, 1875. Republican candidate Seldon Connor defeated the Democratic candidate Charles W. Roberts.

== Candidates ==
=== Republican ===
- Seldon Connor

=== Democratic ===
- Charles W. Roberts

== Results ==
1875 Maine gubernatorial election
Party	Candidate	Votes	%	±%
Republican	Seldon Connor	57,812	51.77%	
Democratic	Charles W. Roberts	52,807	48.19%	
