= 1882 Maine gubernatorial election =

- September 11, 1882
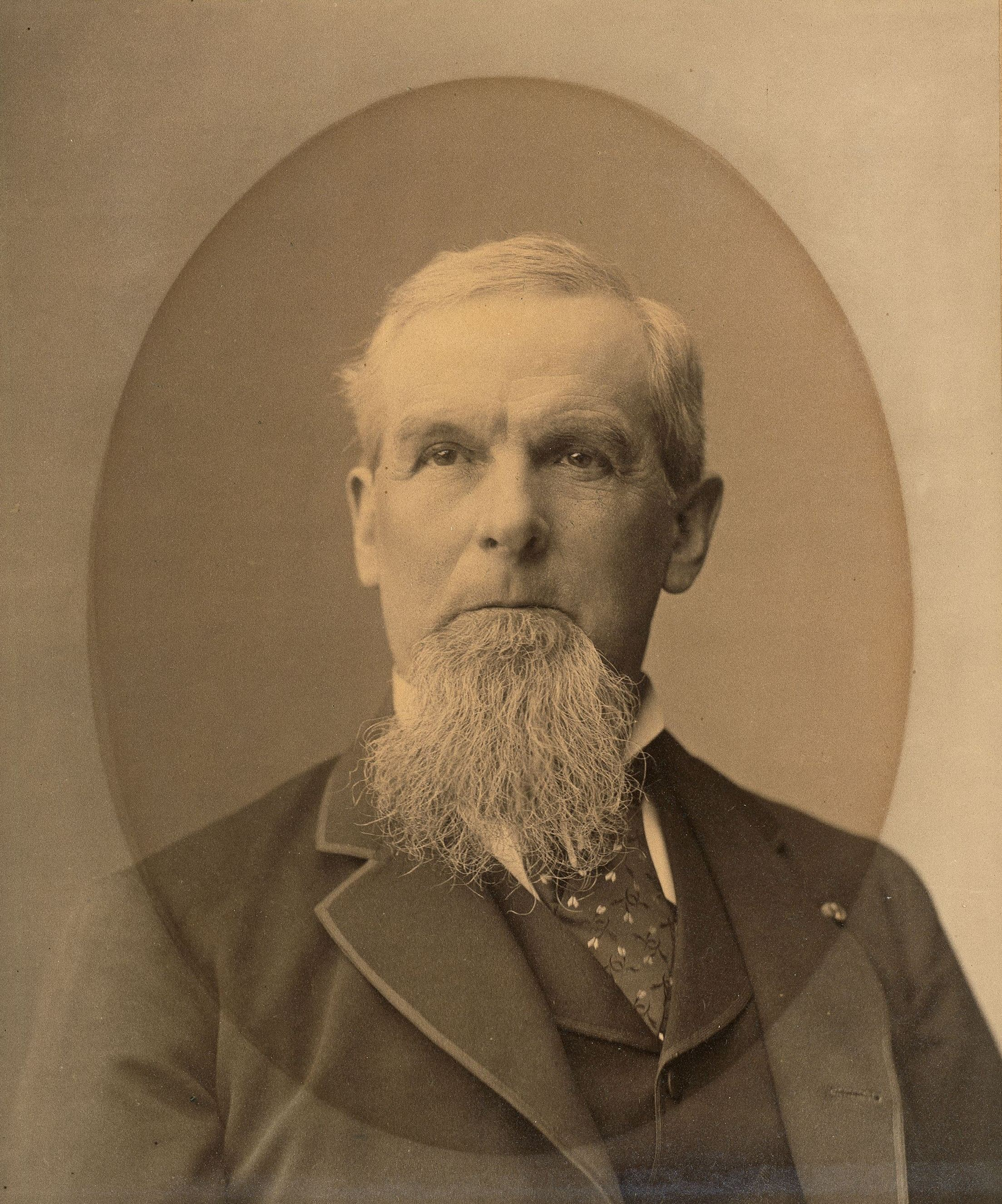

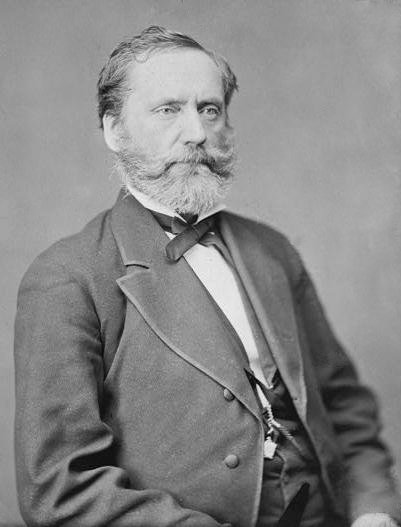
Nominee	Frederick Robie	Harris M. Plaisted
Party	Republican	Democratic
Popular vote	72,481	63,921
Percentage	52.36%	46.18%
- County results Robie: 50–60% 60–70% Plaisted: 50–60%
Governor before election
Harris M. Plaisted
Democratic
Elected Governor
Frederick Robie
Republican

The 1882 Maine gubernatorial election was held on September 11, 1882, in order to elect the governor of Maine. Republican nominee and former member of the Maine Senate Frederick Robie defeated incumbent Democratic governor Harris M. Plaisted, Greenback nominee and former member of the Maine House of Representatives Solon Chase, Prohibition nominee William T. Eustis and Independent Republican candidate and former president of the Maine Senate Warren H. Vinton.

== General election ==
On election day, September 11, 1882, Republican nominee Frederick Robie won the election by a margin of 8,560 votes against his foremost opponent incumbent Democratic governor Harris M. Plaisted, thereby gaining Republican control over the office of governor. Robie was sworn in as the 39th governor of Maine on January 3, 1883.

=== Results ===
Maine gubernatorial election, 1882
Party	Candidate	Votes	%
Republican	Frederick Robie	72,481	52.36
Democratic	Harris M. Plaisted (incumbent)	63,921	46.18
Greenback	Solon Chase	1,324	0.96
Prohibition	William T. Eustis	381	0.28
Independent Republican	Warren H. Vinton	269	0.19
	Scattering	56	0.03
Total votes		138,432	100.00
Republican gain from Democratic			
