= Solon Chase =

American politician from Maine

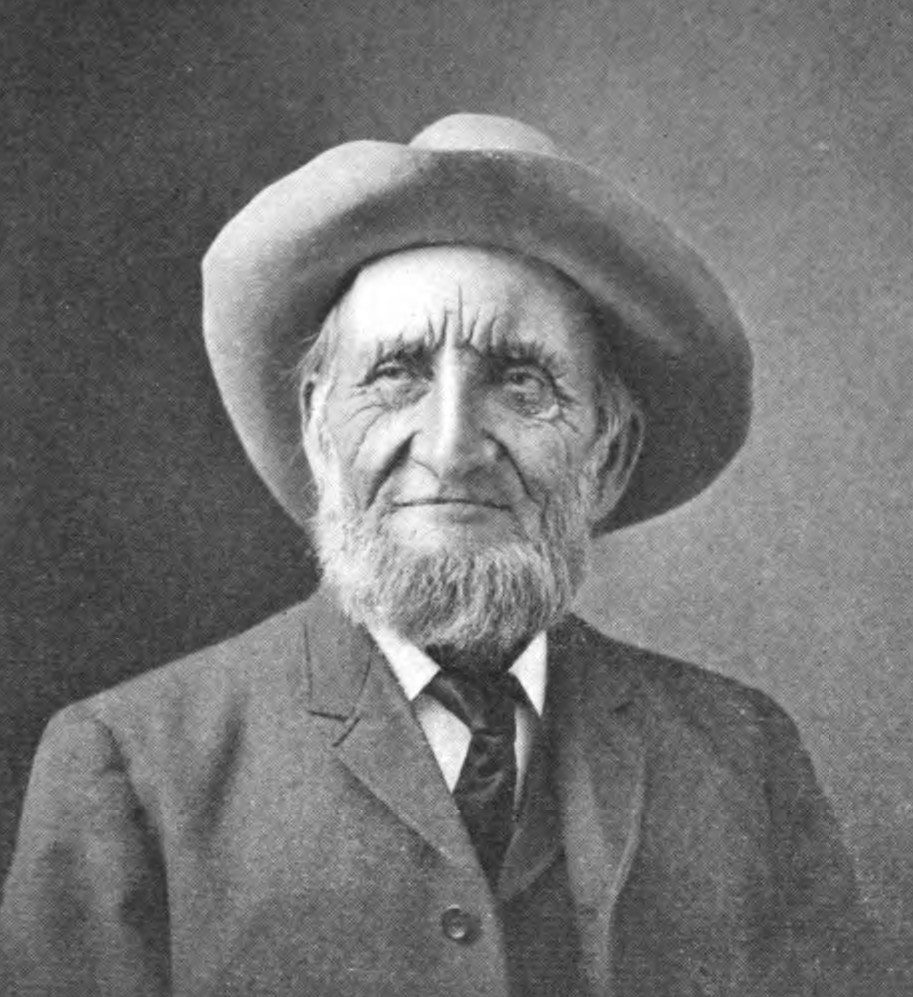

Member of the Maine House of Representatives from the Turner district
- In office 1862–1863
- Preceded by: D.H. Teague

Personal details
- Born: 1823
- Died: November 23, 1909 (aged 85–86)
- Party: Republican; Greenback
- Occupation: Farmer, Orchardist, Newspaper publisher

Solon Chase (1823 – November 23, 1909) was an American farmer, orchardist, politician and newspaper publisher from Maine. Chase served two single year terms in the Maine House of Representatives. In 1873, an economic depression began and Chase joined the national Greenback Party. He is credited with founding the Greenback Party in Maine. Chase sought to build an independent movement of farmers and workers through the Greenback Party and opposed electoral fusion with the Maine Democratic Party.

A farmer, Chase was nationally known for the catchphrase and stump speech 'them steers'. In 'them steers', he spoke of the tending his steers for the benefit of the financial elite, but not his town, county or state. Upon his death, the New York Times, which was a Republican newspaper, remembered Chase for his unusual stump speeches, noting that "during the height of the greenback campaign, Chase stumped the country as far as the Middle West, driving a pair of steers hitched to a hayrack from the rear end of which he delivered his speeches."

== Political career ==
Chase was born in the Chase's Mill area of Turner, Maine, in 1823. Chase was a member of the Whig Party prior to the American Civil War. During the Civil War, he joined the Republican Party and served two terms in the Maine House of Representatives. He was appointed an internal revenue collector by President Andrew Johnson, though like most of Johnson's appointments, Chase was never confirmed.

During the June 1880 Greenback National Convention, Chase was a prominent candidate for the presidential nomination. Chase, known as "the farmer's friend," was nominated by fellow Maine delegate Frank M. Fogg. In the first vote, Chase received 89 votes, which was a distant 5th place from the eventual nominee, Iowa Congressman James B. Weaver.

In 1882, Chase was the nominee of the Greenback Party for governor and received .9% (1,324) of the total vote. He ran against Republican nominee and eventual winner Frederick Robie as well as Democrat Harris M. Plaisted. Plaisted was a fusion nominee of the Democratic Party and some in the Greenback Party.

== Newspaper publishing ==
In January 1875, Chase began published Chase's Chronicle from his farm in Turner. By 1879, the publication had a circulation of 6,000. It then moved to Portland, where it was renamed the Greenback Labor Chronicle. However, the Labor Chronicle was discontinued a year later. Just a year later, a stock company owned by Solon Chase created Chase's Enquirer. However, in 1882, the company took the paper over from its editor, Chase, and moved the publication to Lewiston. It was suspended within six months. In March 1882, Chase formed yet another newspaper, this called Them Steers in honor of the catchphrase popularized by the editor. Them Steers also failed and the publication ceased to print in 1883.

== Farming ==
Chase was a lifelong farmer. Notice of Chase's death received special attention in the annual report of the Maine Commissioner of Agriculture, "In the death of Solon Chase, which occurred on November 23, 1909, the orchard interests of Maine lost a firm friend." Chase had more than six hundred Northern Spy apple trees in his orchard at the time of his death. The report by Commissioner of Agriculture called Solon Chase the "spy" king of Maine.
