= Senator Talbot (disambiguation) =

Isham Talbot (1773–1837) was a U.S. Senator from Kentucky from 1815 to 1819 and 1820 to 1825. Senator Talbot may also refer to:

- John C. Talbot (1784–1860), Maine State Senate
- Kirk Talbot (born 1969), Louisiana State Senate
- Matthew Talbot (1767–1827), Georgia State Senate
- Ray Herbert Talbot (1896–1955), Colorado State Senate

== See also ==
- Albert G. Talbott (1808–1887), Kentucky State Senate
