= 1878 Maine gubernatorial election =

- September 9, 1878
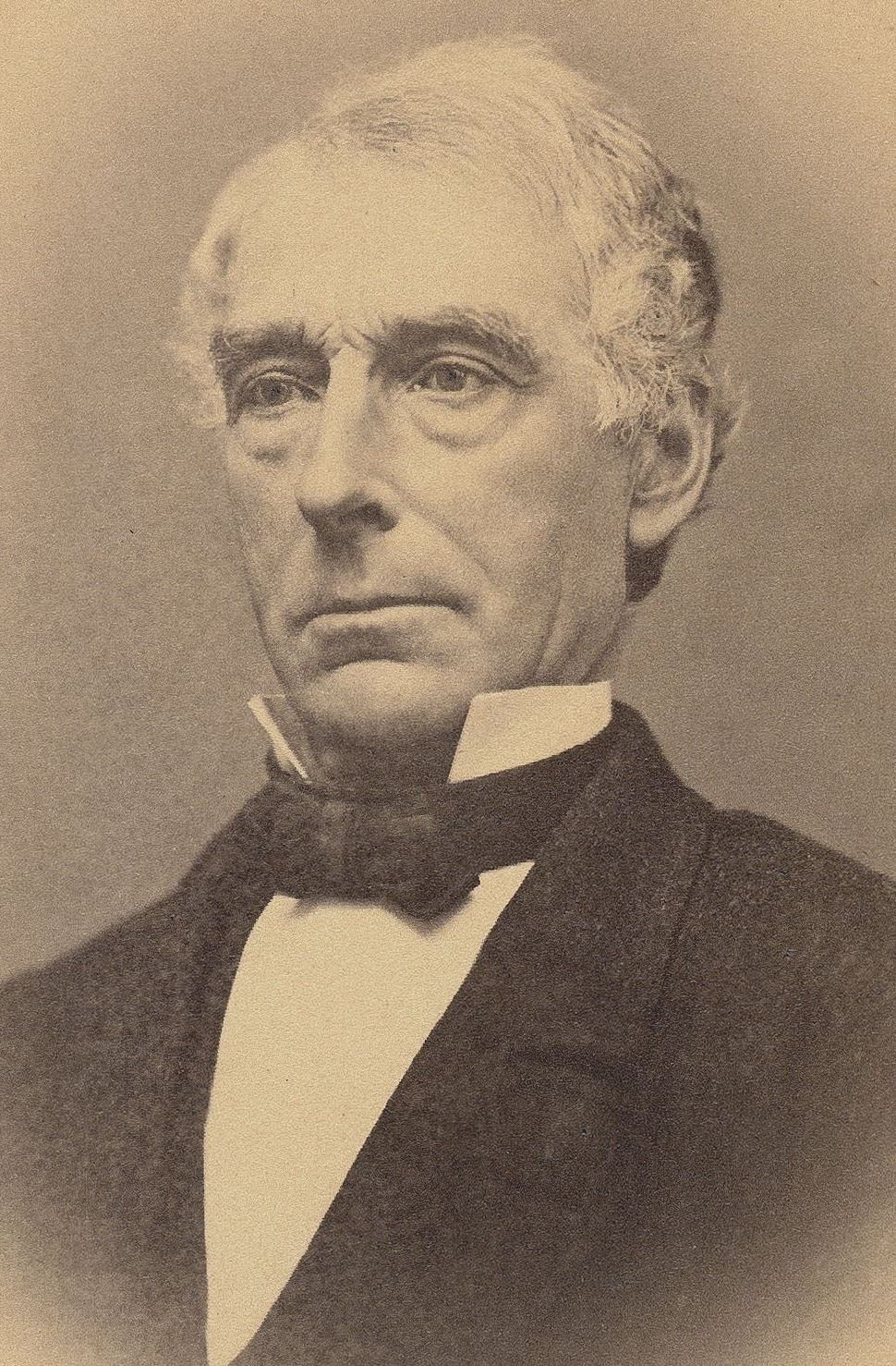

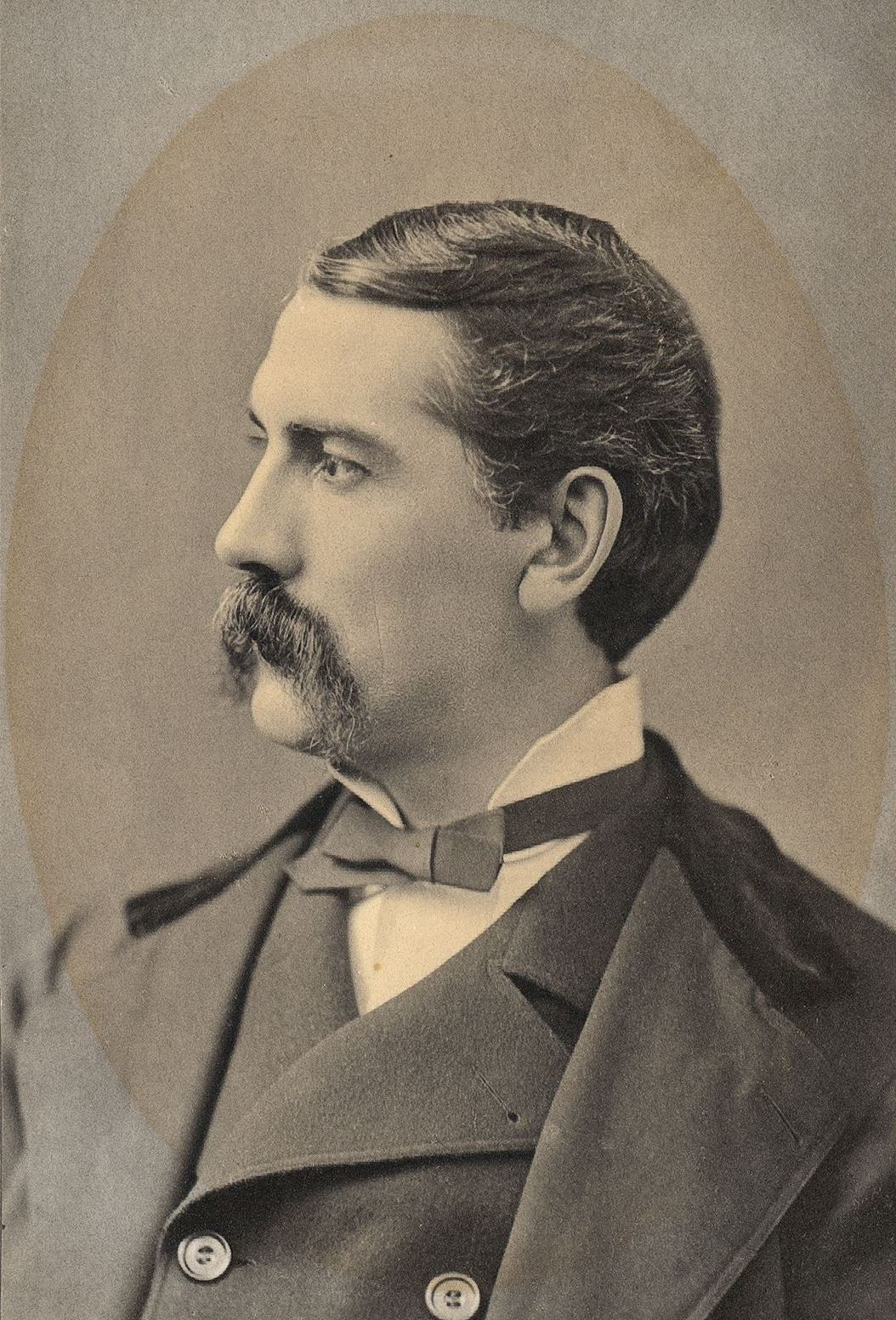

| Nominee | Alonzo Garcelon | Seldon Connor | Joseph L. Smith |
| Party | Democratic | Republican | Greenback |
| Electoral vote | (Elected) |
| Popular vote | 28,218 | 56,554 | 41,371 |
| Percentage | 22.36% | 44.82% | 32.79% |
- County results Connor: 30–40% 40–50% 50–60% 60–70% Smith: 40–50% 50–60% 60–70%
Governor before election
Seldon Connor
Republican
Elected Governor
Alonzo Garcelon
Democratic

The 1878 Maine gubernatorial election was held on September 9, 1878, in order to elect the governor of Maine. Democratic nominee and former mayor of Lewiston Alonzo Garcelon defeated incumbent Republican governor Seldon Connor and Greenback nominee Joseph L. Smith.

As no candidate received a majority of the total votes cast as was required by Maine law, the election was forwarded to the Maine legislature, who chose Garcelon as governor, despite the fact he came in last of the three candidates in the popular vote, and had failed to carry a single county. He received fewer than half of the votes incumbent Connor received.

Garcelon would be the only Democrat to serve as Governor of Maine between 1857 (when Samuel Wells left office) and 1911 (when Frederick W. Plaisted assumed office), and one of only two Maine governors in that same time period to not be a member of the Republican Party (the other being Harris M. Plaisted, a Greenback elected with the support of the Democratic Party).

This is the only gubernatorial election in the history of the United States where the winning candidate did not win any county in the state.

== General election ==
On election day, September 9, 1878, Democratic nominee Alonzo Garcelon won the election despite losing the popular vote by a margin of 28,336 votes against his foremost opponent incumbent Republican governor Seldon Connor, thereby gaining Democratic control over the office of governor. Garcelon was sworn in as the 36th governor of Maine on January 8, 1879.

=== Results ===
Maine gubernatorial election, 1878
| Party | Candidate | Votes | % |
|---|---|---|---|
| Democratic | Alonzo Garcelon | 28,218 | 22.36 |
| Republican | Seldon Connor (incumbent) | 56,554 | 44.82 |
| Greenback | Joseph L. Smith | 41,371 | 32.79 |
| | Scattering | 36 | 0.03 |
| Total votes | | 126,179 | 100.00 |
| Democratic gain from Republican | | | |
