= 1876 Maine gubernatorial election =

- September 11, 1876
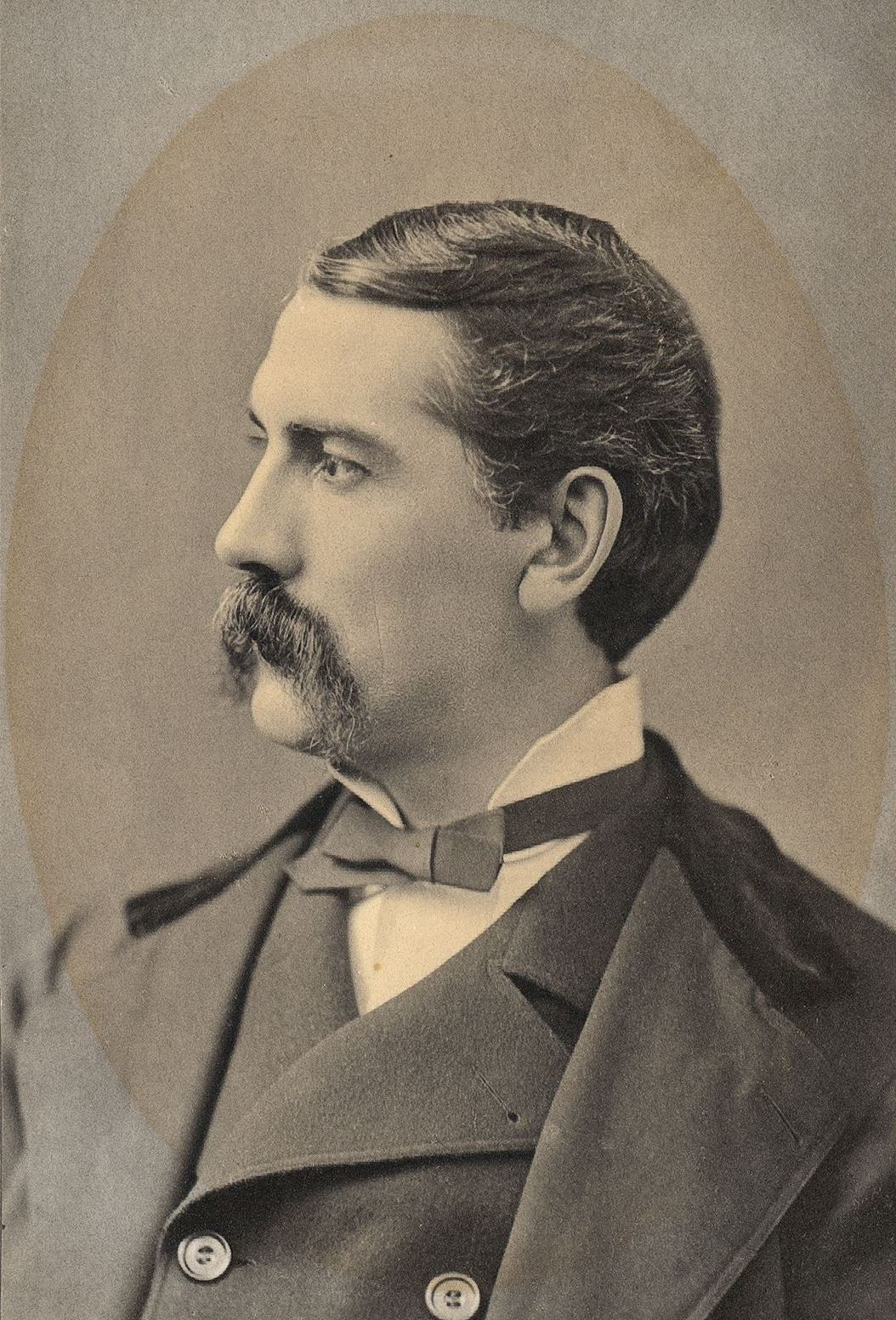

| Nominee | Seldon Connor | John C. Talbot |
| Party | Republican | Democratic |
| Popular vote | 75,867 | 60,423 |
| Percentage | 55.45% | 44.16% |
- County results Connor: 50–60% 60–70%
Governor before election
Seldon Connor
Republican
Elected Governor
Seldon Connor
Republican

The 1876 Maine gubernatorial election was held on September 11, 1876. Incumbent Republican governor Seldon Connor defeated Democratic nominee John C. Talbot.

== General election ==
=== Candidates ===
==== Republican ====
- Seldon Connor

==== Democratic ====
- John C. Talbot

=== Results ===
1876 Maine gubernatorial election
| Party | Candidate | Votes | % | ±% |
|---|---|---|---|---|
| Republican | Seldon Connor (incumbent) | 75,867 | 55.45% | |
| Democratic | John C. Talbot | 60,423 | 44.16% | |
