= Alonzo Garcelon =

36th Governor of Maine and Union Army surgeon

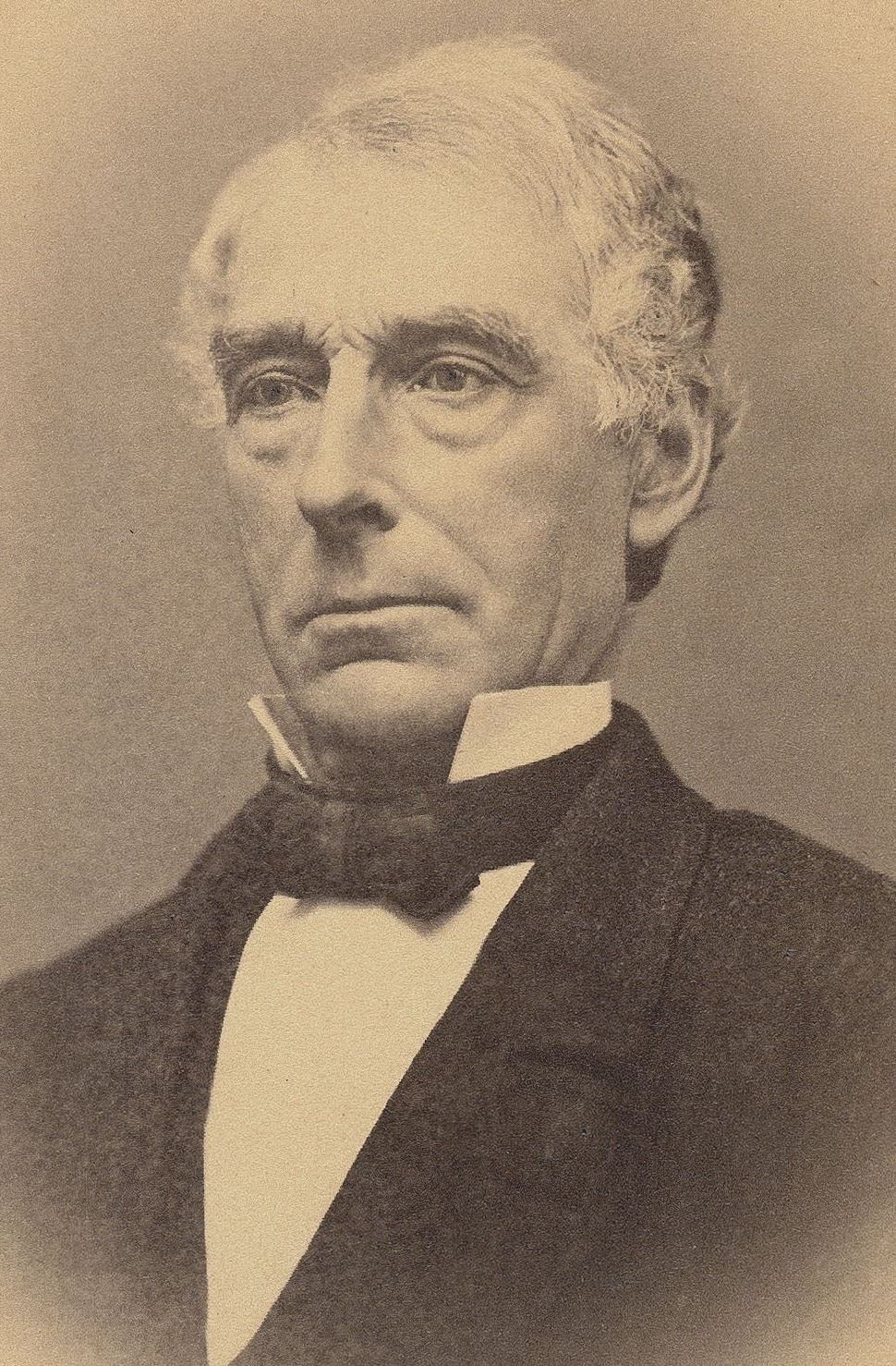

36th Governor of Maine
- In office January 8, 1879 – January 7, 1880
- Preceded by: Seldon Connor
- Succeeded by: Daniel F. Davis

Mayor of Lewiston, Maine
- In office 1871
- Preceded by: William H. Stevens
- Succeeded by: David Cowan

Member of the Maine Senate
- In office 1855–1856

Member of the Maine House of Representatives
- In office 1853–1854; 1857–1858

Personal details
- Born: May 6, 1813 Lewiston, Massachusetts (now Maine), U.S.
- Died: December 8, 1906 (aged 93) Medford, Massachusetts, U.S.
- Resting place: Riverside Cemetery; Lewiston, Maine, U.S.
- Party: Democratic
- Other political affiliations: Whig, Free Soiler, Republican
- Education: Bowdoin College; Medical University of Ohio
- Profession: Physician

Military service
- Allegiance: United States of America; Union
- Branch/service: United States Army; Union Army
- Years of service: 1861–1865
- Rank: Surgeon General
- Battles/wars: American Civil War

Alonzo Garcelon (May 6, 1813 – December 8, 1906) was the 36th governor of Maine, and a surgeon general of Maine during the American Civil War.

== Early life and education ==
Garcelon was born in Lewiston (in modern-day Maine, then a part of Massachusetts), to French Huguenot parents. Garcelon attended Monmouth Academy, Waterville Academy, and New Castle Academy. Garcelon taught school during the winter terms to help pay for his tuition. In 1836 Garcelon graduated from Bowdoin College, and in 1839 he graduated from the Medical College of Ohio in Cincinnati, Ohio, and then returned to Lewiston to practice. Garcelon co-founded the Lewiston Journal in 1847. He served in the Maine House of Representatives from 1853 to 1854, 1857 to 1858, and in the Maine Senate from 1855 to 1856. Garcelon donated to Bates College in Lewiston in 1855 and served as an instructor and trustee at the College.

In 1853, Garcelon was one of the 27 founding members of the Maine Medical Association.

His son, Alonzo Marston Garcelon, graduated from Bates in 1872 and went on to serve as Mayor of Lewiston from 1883 to 1884. He was elected as a Delegate to the Republican National Convention in 1856. Garcelon's medical partner, Dr. Edward H. Hill, founded Central Maine Medical Center.

== Civil War and politics ==
During the Civil War, Garcelon served in the Union Army as a Maine surgeon general. During the impeachment of Andrew Johnson after the War, Garcelon became disgusted with the Republican Party and their policy of "Radical Reconstruction" and became a Democrat. In 1871 he was elected mayor of Lewiston, and in 1878 he was elected Governor of Maine by the legislature after no candidate received a majority of the vote, serving one term until 1880. His election by the legislature was not without controversy — in the popular vote, Garcelon had finished last of the three candidates vying for the governorship, had failed to carry a single county in the state, and had finished with fewer the half the votes of the incumbent Republican Seldon Connor. Garcelon would be the only Democrat to serve as Governor of Maine between 1857 (when Samuel Wells left office) and 1911 (when Frederick W. Plaisted assumed office), and one of only two Maine governors in that same time period to not be a member of the Republican Party (the other being Harris M. Plaisted, a Greenback elected with the support of the Democratic Party).

During his term as governor, Garcelon oversaw the "Greenback" controversy, when he investigated alleged voter fraud and determined that the Democrats and not the Republicans had won a majority in the legislature. Senator James Blaine came to Augusta with a hundred armed men to protest the results, and Garcelon called out the state militia. Civil war was narrowly averted, thanks to the peaceful intervention of militia leader Joshua Lawrence Chamberlain.

Garcelon ran for re-election in 1879, but was overwhelmingly defeated, securing just 15% of the vote.

In 1883 Garcelon's son was elected mayor of Lewiston.

Garcelon died in Medford, Massachusetts, and was buried at Riverside Cemetery in Lewiston, Maine.

== Legacy and honors ==
Garcelon Field at Bates College is named in his honor, as is the Alonzo Garcelon Society, which provides scholarships to Bates for local students. In 2008, the Garcelon family announced the donation of a large collection of Garcelon family manuscripts to the Bates College Special Collections Library.

== Gallery ==
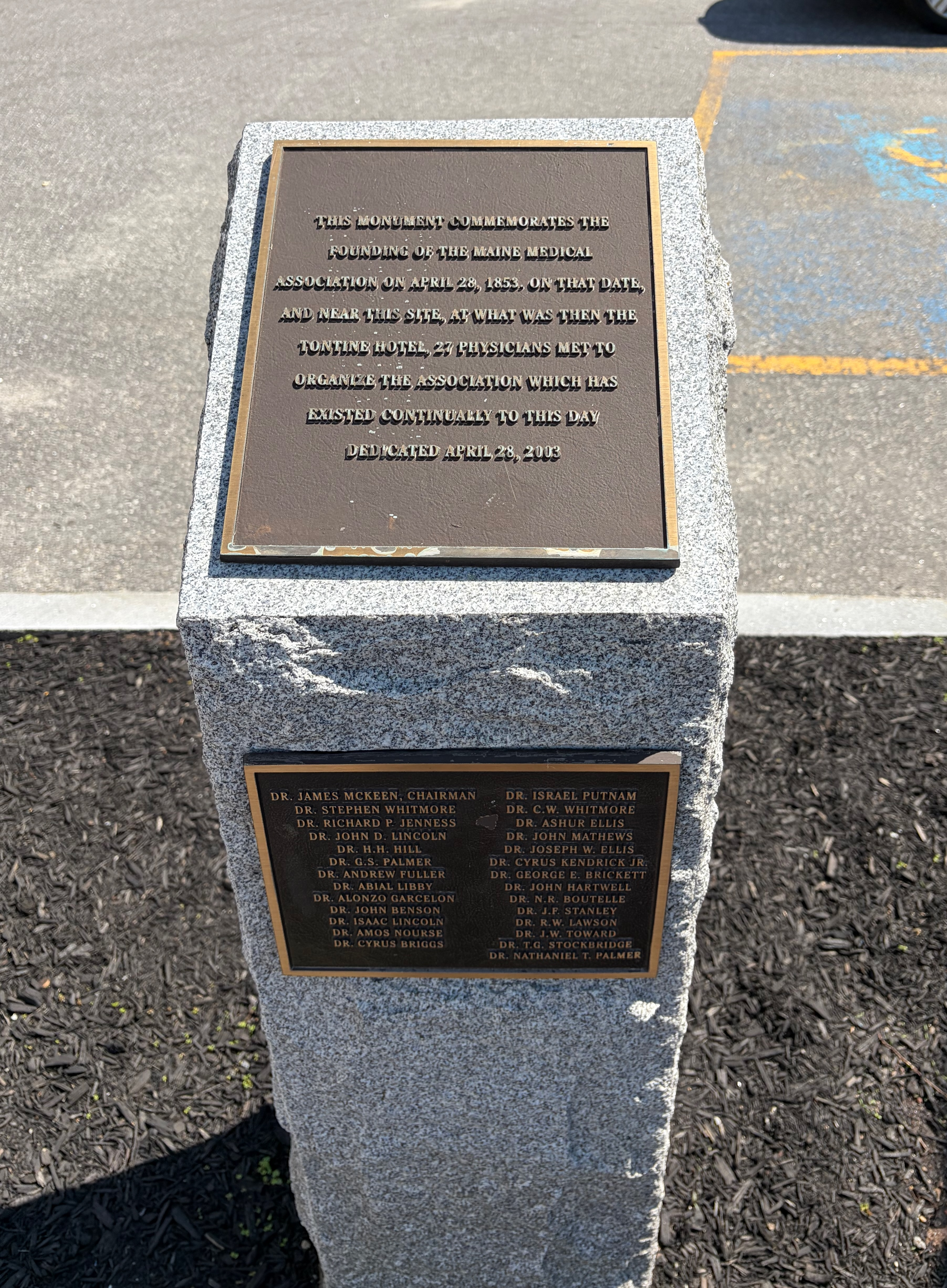
Garcelon's name is included on a plaque commemorating the establishment of the Maine Medical Association at the Tontine Hotel in Brunsick, Maine, in 1853

== See also ==
- List of Bates College people
- List of governors of Maine
- List of mayors of Lewiston, Maine

Party political offices
| Preceded by Joseph H. Williams | Democratic nominee for Governor of Maine; 1878, 1879 | Succeeded by Harris M. Plaisted |
Political offices
| Preceded by Seldon Connor | Governor of Maine; 1879–1880 | Succeeded by Daniel F. Davis |
