= 1880 Maine gubernatorial election =

- September 13, 1880
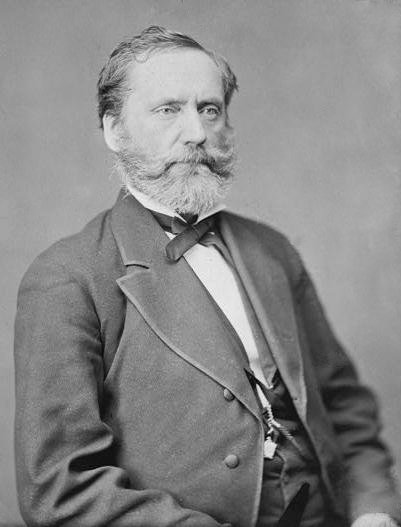

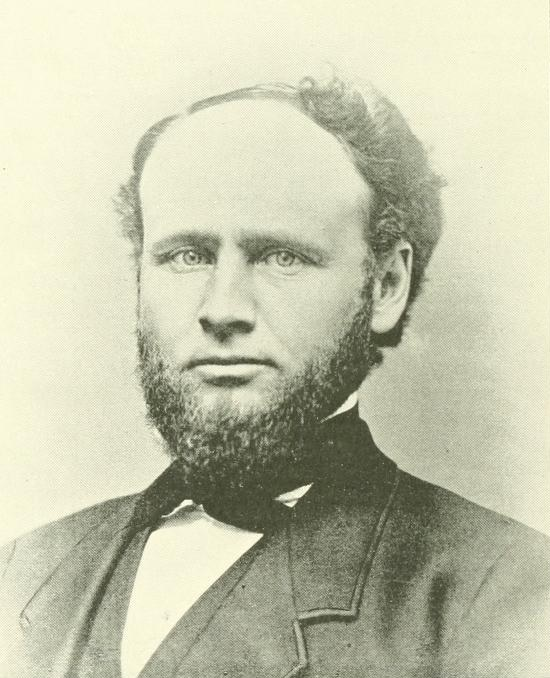
Nominee	Harris M. Plaisted	Daniel F. Davis
Party	Greenback	Republican
Alliance	Democratic
Popular vote	73,713	73,544
Percentage	49.91%	49.80%
- County results Plaisted: 40–50% 50–60% Davis: 50–60% 60–70%
Governor before election
Daniel F. Davis
Republican
Elected Governor
Harris M. Plaisted
Greenback

The 1880 Maine gubernatorial election was held on September 13, 1880, for a two-year term that was scheduled to run from January 13, 1881, to January 3, 1883. The contest resulted in the victory of Greenback and Democratic nominee Harris M. Plaisted, who narrowly defeated incumbent Republican governor Daniel F. Davis, one of the few times Republicans lost control of the governorship between the founding of the party in the 1850s and the Great Depression.

This was the first gubernatorial election in Maine in which a plurality of the popular vote was sufficient to elect the governor, in accordance with a constitutional amendment ratified the same day. This was also the first gubernatorial election in Maine in which the victor would serve a two-year term.

== Background ==
In 1878, events including wage cuts that precipitated the Great Railroad Strike of 1877 caused Plaisted to leave the Republican Party because of dissatisfaction with their monetary policy. As did many farmers and laborers, Plaisted opposed currency backed by gold and silver, arguing that it caused the post-Panic of 1873 deflation that reduced wages and prices paid to farmers, laborers, and producers of raw materials. Instead, he favored federal government-issued currency not backed by gold and silver, believing that this would prevent deflation and make business easier to transact by holding costs and salaries steady.

Both the national Republican and Democratic parties favored specie-backed currency issued by state-chartered banks. As a result of his unhappiness with the Republicans, Plaisted joined the new Greenback Party, and became their candidate for governor in 1881. He was also backed by pro-Greenback Democrats, and became the fusion candidate of both parties.

Davis had been elected governor in 1879 after a protracted struggle that resulted when none of the three major candidates—Republican, Democratic, and Greenback—received a majority, though Davis had attained a significant plurality. The legislature was required to choose, and Democrats and Greenbackers were the majority, but could not agree between themselves. Republican legislators eventually barred their opponents from the Maine State House, reconstituted the legislature, and elected Davis to the governorship. The dispute was then submitted to the Maine Supreme Court. Composed of seven Republicans and one Democrat, the court sustained the Republicans in the legislature, and Davis was inaugurated.

During Davis's governorship, Maine's government was chiefly concerned with the ongoing issue of regulating alcoholic beverages, with some legislators favoring manufacture, sale and consumption, some prohibition and some local option. In addition, the dispute over the 1879 election remained an important issue, and carried over to the 1880 campaign.

== Result ==
Taking advantage of voter unhappiness caused by the lingering effects of the 1873 economic downturn and the 1879 election, Plaisted prevailed over incumbent Davis by fewer than 200 votes, becoming one of only four non-Republicans to hold the governorship between the founding of the party in the 1850s and the Great Depression in 1929.

- Plaisted: 73,713 (49.91%)
- Davis: 73,544 (49.80%)

Two minor candidates, prohibition supporters Joshua Nye and William P. Joy also received votes. Nye's totals were 309 (.21%) and Joy's were 124 or .08%.

The rare Republican loss in Maine was seen as a sign that the post-Civil War tactic of "waving the bloody shirt" was less viable that it had been, and that Republicans would have to devise a new strategy in order to win the November presidential election.

== Sources ==
=== Books ===
- History of Penobscot County, Maine. Cleveland, OH: Williams, Chase & Co. 1882. p. 64. ISBN 9785873772766.
- Dubin, Michael J. (2010). United States Gubernatorial Elections, 1861-1911. Jefferson, NC: McFarland & Co. ISBN 978-0-7864-4722-0.

=== Internet ===
- "1880: Garfield v. Hancock". The Presidential Elections, 1860-1912. HarpWeek. 1998.
