= Daniel F. Davis =

American politician

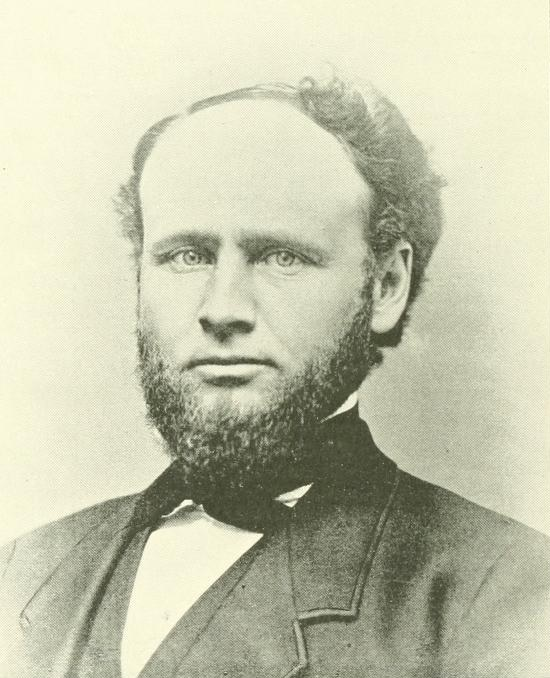

37th Governor of Maine
- In office January 17, 1880 – January 13, 1881
- Preceded by: Alonzo Garcelon
- Succeeded by: Harris M. Plaisted

Member of the Maine Senate
- In office 1875–1879

Member of the Maine House of Representatives
- In office 1871–1875

Personal details
- Born: September 12, 1843 Freedom, Maine, US
- Died: January 9, 1897 (aged 53) Bangor, Maine, US
- Resting place: Corinthian Cemetery, Corinth, Maine
- Party: Republican
- Spouse: Laura B. Goodwin (m. 1867)
- Children: 8
- Education: Wesleyan Seminary, Kents Hill, Maine
- Profession: Attorney

Daniel Franklin Davis (September 12, 1843 – January 9, 1897) was an American lawyer and politician who served as the 37th governor of Maine. He served in the Union Army during the American Civil War. A Republican, he served in the Maine House of Representatives and Maine Senate.

== Early life ==
Davis was born in Freedom, Maine, on September 12, 1843. He was the second child and oldest son of the Rev. Moses Franklin and Mary (French) Davis. He entered the East Corinth Academy in 1863 but after a few weeks he enlisted in the Union Army to fight in the Civil War.

Davis served in the 1st District of Columbia Cavalry Regiment and the 1st Maine Volunteer Cavalry Regiment, and attained the rank of corporal in the 1st Maine Cavalry's Company F.

He then studied at the Corinna Academy, and at the Wesleyan Seminary in Kents Hill, Maine. He studied law, was admitted to the bar in 1869, and established his law career in East Corinth.

== Politics ==
Davis became a member of the Maine House of Representatives in 1871. He held that position for four years. He then became a member of the Maine Senate in 1875. He held that position until 1879. In 1879, he was nominated for the governorship by the Maine Republican Party. In the general election, Davis earned 49.52% of the vote. As no candidate received a majority of the vote, the election moved to the Legislature, which selected Davis. He served from January 17, 1880, to January 13, 1881. During his administration, the enforcement of the prohibition law was contested. Davis was not successful in his re-election bid.

== Later life ==
After leaving office, Davis open Davis & Bailey, a law firm, in Bangor alongside Charles A. Bailey. Bailey's son, future State Senator Taber D. Bailey, began studying law while at their practice. He also served as the federal collector of customs for the Port of Bangor in Bangor, Maine from 1882 to 1886. He died in Bangor on January 9, 1897, and was buried at Corinthian Cemetery in Corinth.

== Family ==
In 1867, Davis married Laura B. Goodwin of East Corinth; they were the parents of eight children, five of whom lived to adulthood.

== Sources ==
=== Books ===
- History of Penobscot County, Maine: With Illustrations and Biographical Sketches. Cleveland, OH: Williams, Chase & Co. 1882. p. 823.

== External sources ==
- Sobel, Robert and John Raimo. Biographical Directory of the Governors of the United States, 1789-1978. Greenwood Press, 1988. ISBN 0-313-28093-2
- "Biography, Daniel Franklin Davis". www.nga.org. National Governors Association. January 5, 2011.

Party political offices
Preceded by Seldon Connor	Republican nominee for Governor of Maine; 1879, 1880	Succeeded by Frederick Robie
Political offices
Preceded by Alonzo Garcelon	Governor of Maine; 1880–1881	Succeeded by Harris M. Plaisted
