= Joseph H. Williams =

American politician

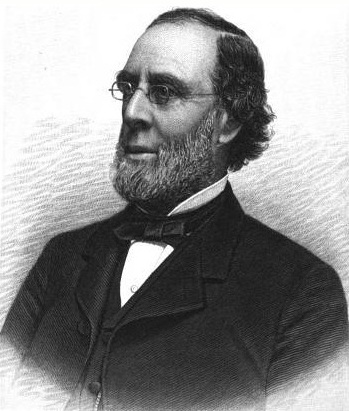

27th Governor of Maine
- In office February 25, 1857 – January 6, 1858
- Preceded by: Hannibal Hamlin
- Succeeded by: Lot M. Morrill

Member of the Maine House of Representatives
- In office 1864–1866; 1873-1875

Personal details
- Born: February 15, 1814 Augusta, Massachusetts (now Maine)
- Died: July 19, 1896 (aged 82) Augusta, Maine, US
- Party: Republican
- Education: Harvard University
- Profession: Attorney

Joseph Hartwell Williams (February 15, 1814 – July 19, 1896) was an American politician who served as the 27th governor of Maine from 1857 to 1858.

== Early years ==
Williams was born in Augusta, District of Maine on February 15, 1814. He graduated from Harvard University in 1830. He also studied at Dane Law School in Cambridge.

== Politics ==
Williams was a Democrat. In 1854, he switched his political allegiance and become a Republican. He became a member and president of the Maine State Senate in 1857. Hannibal Hamlin, the Governor of Maine at the time, resigned on February 25, 1857, to accept the position of United States Senator. Williams, president of the senate at the time, became the new governor of the state. He completed the term of Hannibal Hamlin. He left office on January 6, 1858.

== Later years ==
After leaving office, Williams served as a member of the Maine House of Representatives from 1864 to 1866. He was re-elected as an independent to the Maine House of Representatives in 1873. He held that position for two years. He ran for governorship in 1873, but he was unsuccessful. He then practiced law. He died on July 19, 1896.

== Sources ==
- Sobel, Robert and John Raimo. Biographical Directory of the Governors of the United States, 1789-1978. Greenwood Press, 1988. ISBN 0-313-28093-2

Party political offices
Preceded by John C. Talbot	Democratic nominee for Governor of Maine; 1877	Succeeded by Alonzo Garcelon
Political offices
Preceded by Hannibal Hamlin	Governor of Maine; 1857–1858	Succeeded by Lot M. Morrill
