= Lot Morrill House =

Historic house in Maine, United States

- U.S. National Register of Historic Places
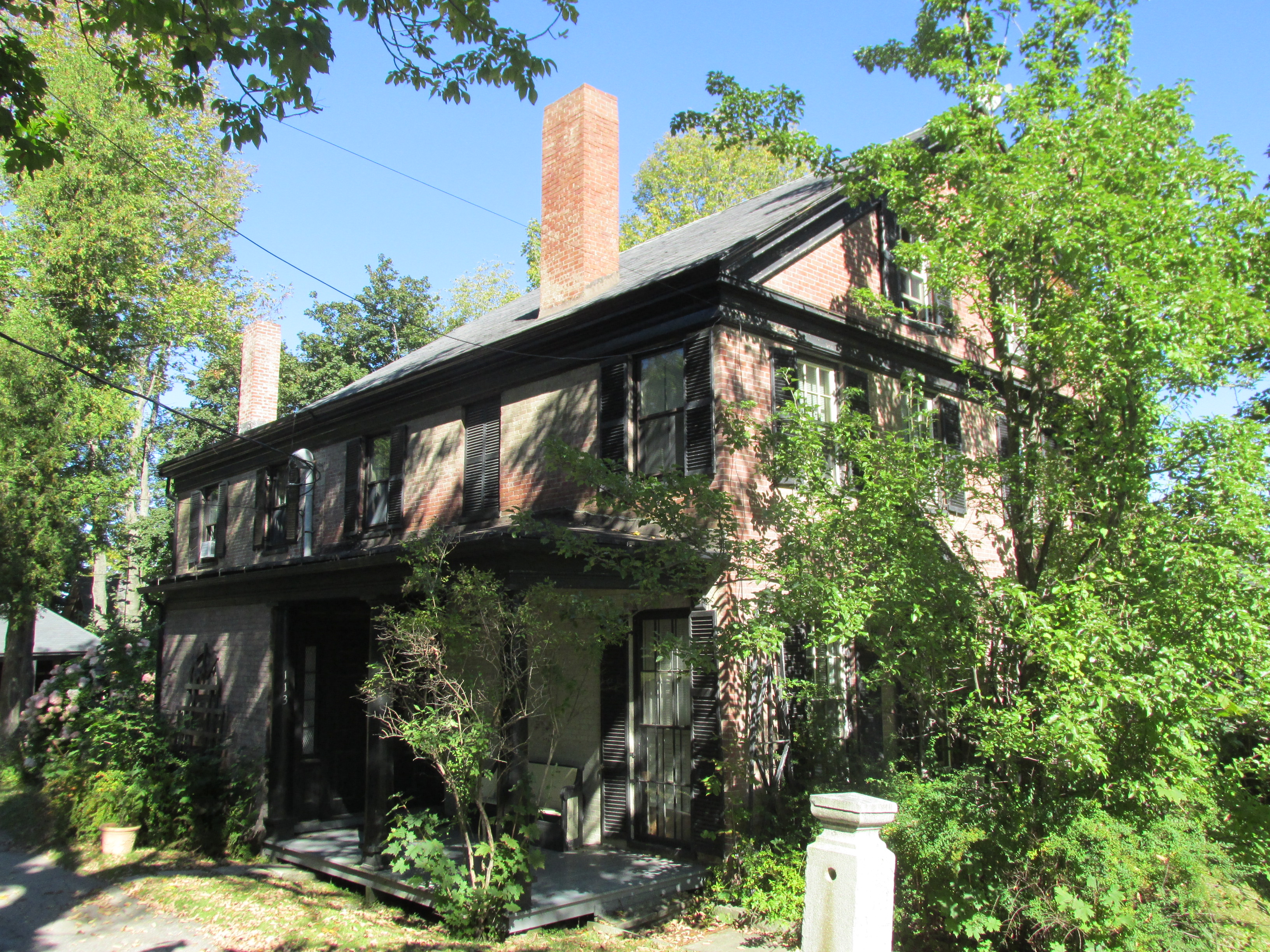

- Location within Maine Location within the United States
- Location: 113 Winthrop St., Augusta, Maine
- Coordinates: 44°19′1″N 69°47′1″W
- Area: 1 acre (0.40 ha)
- Architectural style: Greek Revival
- NRHP reference No.: 74000171
- Added to NRHP: July 18, 1974

The Lot Morrill House is a historic house at 113 Winthrop Street in Augusta, Maine. Built about 1830, it is a fairly typical example of Greek Revival architecture, executed in brick. The house is notable as the home of United States Senator and Governor of Maine Lot Morrill during the period when he was at his height of power. It was listed on the National Register of Historic Places in 1974.

== Description and history ==
The Lot Morrill House stands on the north side of Winthrop Street, west of the city's downtown area and at the northeast corner of Prospect Street. It is a 2 1/2-story brick building, with a front-facing gabled roof. The front facade is four bays wide, with elongated windows on the ground floor, and a fully pedimented gable with deep cornice above. The main entrance is on the left (west) side, sheltered by a wooden porch supported by Doric columns. The entrance is flanked by sidelight windows and topped by wooden panels. The interior retains most of its original Greek Revival woodwork, and has ten distinctive period fireplace mantels. It has been subdivided into apartments.

The house was built about 1830; its first documented owner was businessman Mark Nason, in 1838. The house was the home of Lot Morrill and his family from 1845 until his widowed wife's death in 1918. Morrill was prominent in state politics from 1849, first as a Democrat, but then as a Republican after that party was founded in 1856. He was Governor of Maine from 1858 to 1860, and was elected to the United States Senate in 1861. For two years he served as United States Treasury Secretary under President Ulysses S. Grant. His heirs sold the house in 1919 to John E. Nelson, also a prominent politician.

== See also ==
- National Register of Historic Places listings in Kennebec County, Maine
