= 1879 Maine gubernatorial election =

- September 8, 1879
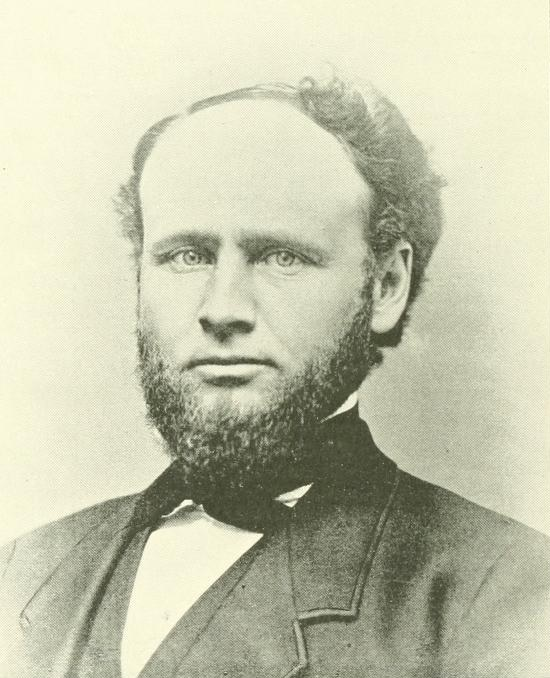

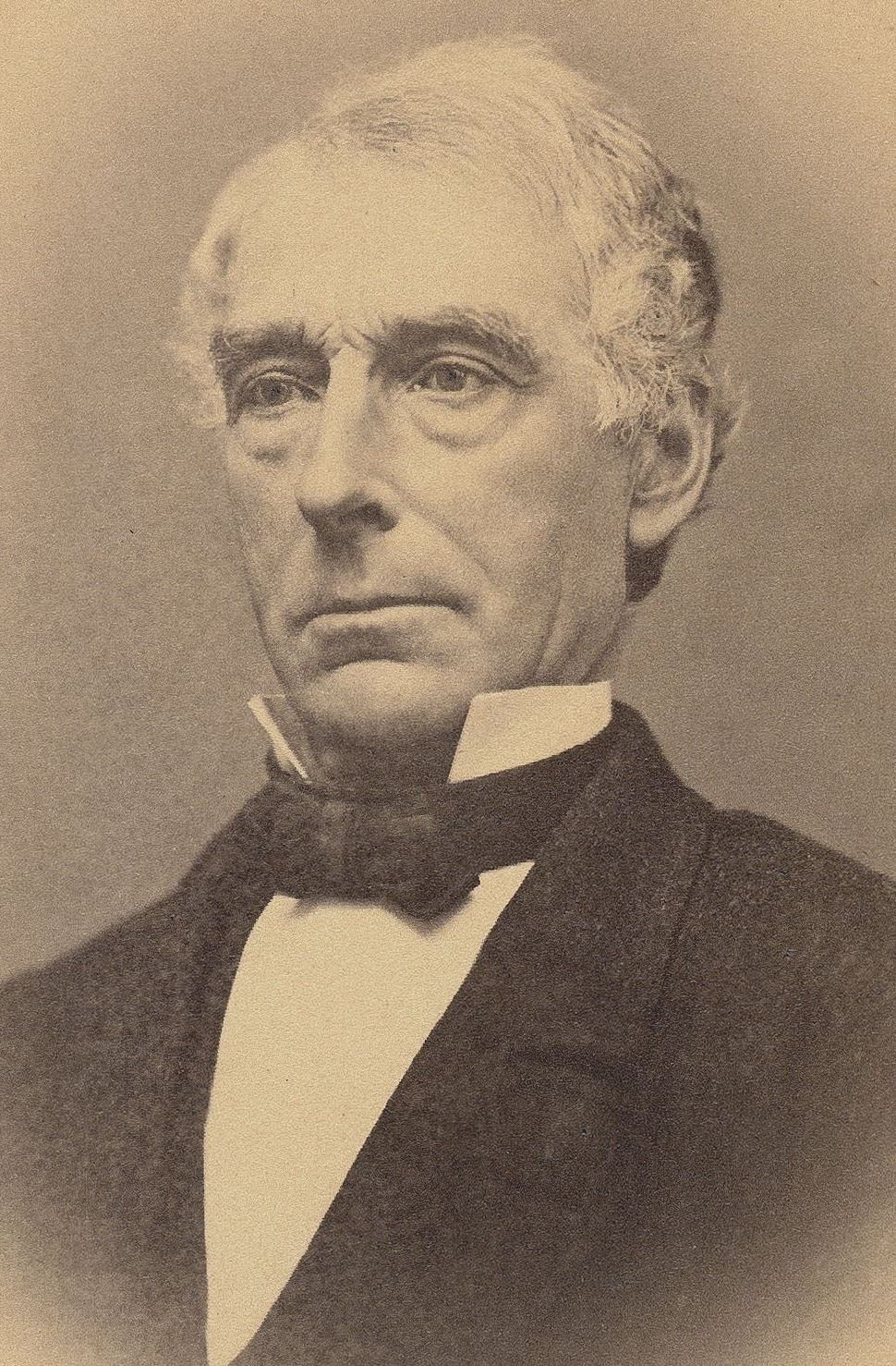
Nominee	Daniel F. Davis	Joseph L. Smith	Alonzo Garcelon
Party	Republican	Greenback	Democratic
Electoral vote	(Elected)
Popular vote	68,527	47,987	21,525
Percentage	49.52%	34.68%	15.56%
- County results Davis: 40–50% 50–60% 60–70% Smith: 50–60%
Governor before election
Alonzo Garcelon
Democratic
Elected Governor
Daniel F. Davis
Republican

The 1879 Maine gubernatorial election was held on September 8, 1879. Republican nominee Daniel F. Davis defeated Greenback nominee Joseph L. Smith and the Democratic nominee, incumbent Governor Alonzo Garcelon.

With Maine switching to two-year gubernatorial terms in 1880, Davis would be the final Maine governor to serve a single-year term, and the final governor chosen by the Maine Legislature after no candidate received a majority of the popular vote.

== General election ==
=== Candidates ===
- Daniel F. Davis, State Senator from Corinth (Republican)
- Alonzo Garcelon, incumbent Governor (Democratic)
- Joseph L. Smith (Greenback)

=== Results ===
1879 Maine gubernatorial election
Party	Candidate	Votes	%	±%
Republican	Daniel F. Davis	68,527	49.52%	+4.70%
Greenback	Joseph L. Smith	47,987	34.68%	+1.89%
Democratic	Alonzo Garcelon (incumbent)	21,525	15.56%	−6.80%

=== Aftermath ===
For the second consecutive election, no candidate received a necessary majority of the popular vote — though Davis had attained a significant plurality — and thus the election was sent to the state legislature to determine the next governor. Democrats and Greenbackers were the majority, but could not agree between themselves. Republican legislators eventually barred their opponents from the Maine State House, reconstituted the legislature, and elected Davis to the governorship. The dispute was then submitted to the Maine Supreme Court. Composed of seven Republicans and one Democrat, the court sustained the Republicans in the legislature, and Davis was inaugurated. This dispute led to a referendum on amending the Constitution of Maine to allow the governor to be elected by plurality voting, which was passed in 1880, making the 1879 election the final time the state legislature chose the governor.
