= 19th Maine Infantry Regiment =

- Active: August 25, 1862, to May 31, 1865
- Country: United States
- Allegiance: Union
- Branch: Infantry
- Battle honours: Battle of Fredericksburg; Battle of Chancellorsville; Battle of Gettysburg; Battle of Bristoe Station; Mine Run Campaign; Battle of Morton's Ford; Battle of the Wilderness; Battle of Spotsylvania; Battle of Cold Harbor; Siege of Petersburg; Second Battle of Ream's Station; Battle of Boydton Plank Road; Battle of Hatcher's Run; Appomattox Campaign

Insignia
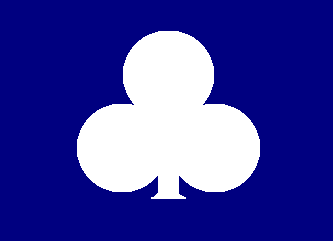
- 2nd Division, II Corps

The 19th Maine Infantry Regiment was an infantry regiment that served in the Union Army during the American Civil War.

== Service ==
19th Maine was organized at Bath, Maine and mustered into Federal service for a three-year enlistment on August 25, 1862.

The total loss of the 19th Maine in the two days of fighting [at Gettysburg] were 12 officers and 220 men, almost 53% of the 19th. The regiment took into battle on the second day of July 440 officers and men."

The regiment absorbed the 5th Company of Unassigned Maine Infantry in November 1864.

The regiment was discharged from service on May 31, 1865 following the Union victory.

== Total strength and casualties ==
1,441 men served in the 19th Maine Infantry Regiment during its service. It lost 192 enlisted men killed in action or died of wounds. 501 members of the regiment were wounded in action, 184 died of disease, and 47 died in Confederate prisons for a total of 376 fatalities from all causes.

== Commanders ==
- Colonel Seldon Connor
- Colonel Francis Edward Heath
- Colonel Isaac Warren Starbird

== See also ==
- List of Maine Civil War units
- Maine in the American Civil War
