= Harris M. Plaisted =

American politician (1828–1898)

Harris Merrill Plaisted
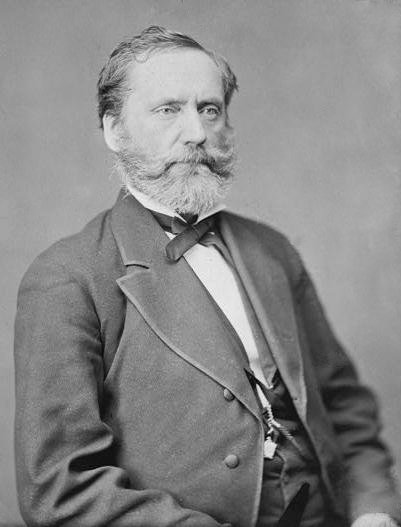
- Brady-Handy photo circa 1875. Library of Congress.

38th Governor of Maine
- In office January 13, 1881 – January 3, 1883
- Preceded by: Daniel F. Davis
- Succeeded by: Frederick Robie

Member of the U.S. House of Representatives from Maine's 4th district district
- In office September 13, 1875 – March 3, 1877
- Preceded by: Samuel F. Hersey
- Succeeded by: Llewellyn Powers

20th Attorney General of Maine
- In office January 1, 1873 – December 1, 1875
- Governor: Sidney Perham; Nelson Dingley Jr.
- Preceded by: Thomas Brackett Reed
- Succeeded by: Lucilius A. Emery

Personal details
- Born: November 2, 1828 Jefferson, New Hampshire, US
- Died: January 31, 1898 (aged 69) Bangor, Maine, US
- Resting place: Mount Hope Cemetery, Bangor, Maine, US
- Party: Republican (before 1878); Greenback (after 1878)
- Spouse(s): Sarah J. Mason (m. 1858, died 1875); Mabel True Hill (m. 1881)
- Children: 3 (including Frederick W. Plaisted)
- Education: Waterville College; Albany Law School
- Profession: Attorney

Military service
- Allegiance: United States; Union
- Branch/service: United States Army; Union Army
- Years of service: 1861–1865
- Rank: Colonel (actual); Major General (brevet)
- Commands: 11th Maine Volunteer Infantry Regiment
- Battles/wars: American Civil War

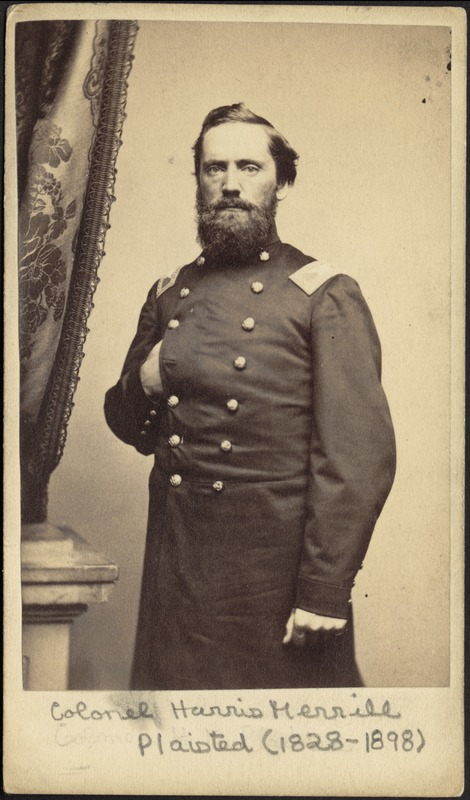
Plaisted as a Colonel during the American Civil War

Harris Merrill Plaisted (November 2, 1828 – January 31, 1898) was an attorney, politician, and Union Army officer from Maine. As colonel, he commanded the 11th Maine Volunteer Infantry Regiment during the American Civil War. After the war, he served as Maine Attorney General, a U.S. representative, and the 38th governor of Maine.

Plaisted was born and raised in Jefferson, New Hampshire. He graduated from Waterville College (1853) and Albany Law School (1855), and practiced law in Bangor. In 1861, he was commissioned as a lieutenant colonel in the Union Army and named second in command of the 11th Maine Volunteer Infantry Regiment. In 1862 he was promoted to colonel and assigned as the regimental commander. He took part in numerous engagements in South Carolina and Virginia, including the Siege of Petersburg. In February 1865 he was appointed brevet brigadier general of volunteers and in 1867 was appointed brevet major general of volunteers for gallant and meritorious services during the war.

After the war, Plaisted resumed practicing law and became involved in politics as a Republican. He served as a member of the Maine House of Representatives in 1867–1868, and was a delegate to the 1868 Republican National Convention. In 1873 he was chosen by the state legislature to serve as Maine Attorney General, and he was reappointed in 1874 and 1875. In December 1875 he resigned as Attorney General in order to take the U.S. House seat for which he had been selected in a special election the previous September. He completed the term of his predecessor, which ended in March 1877, but was not a candidate for a full term.

In 1878, Plaisted left the Republicans over dissatisfaction with their monetary policy, and became a member of the Greenback Party. In 1880, he was elected governor as the fusion candidate of the Greenbacks and the Democrats, and he served from 1881 to 1883. Plaisted died in Bangor in 1898, and was buried at Mount Hope Cemetery in Bangor.

== Early life ==
Plaisted was born and raised in Jefferson, New Hampshire, the son of Deacon William and Nancy (Merrill) Plaisted. He attended the local schools, and attended an academy in Lancaster, New Hampshire, St. Johnsbury Academy, and the New Hampton School. He graduated from Waterville College in 1853, and in 1855 Plaisted received his LL.B. degree from Albany Law School with several honors and awards, including a gold medal for an essay on the topic of equity jurisprudence. Plaisted spent a year teaching school while studying for the bar exam in the office of Bangor, Maine, attorney Albert W. Paine, attained admission to the bar in 1856, and commenced practice in Bangor. From 1858 to 1860 he served on the military staff of Governor Lot M. Morrill as an aide-de-camp with the rank of lieutenant colonel.

== Civil War service ==
Following the outbreak of the Civil War, Plaisted enlisted in the Union Army and was commissioned as the lieutenant colonel of the 11th Maine Volunteer Infantry Regiment on October 30, 1861. He was promoted to colonel on May 12, 1862, and led the regiment in several campaigns in the Eastern Theater. He commanded during the 1862 Peninsula Campaign and participated in the Siege of Yorktown and the subsequent Battle of Williamsburg. Later in the campaign, he fought at the Battle of Seven Pines and in the Seven Days Battles.

In 1863, he and his men were involved in the Siege of Charleston. Plaisted advanced to command of a brigade which included the 11th Maine, 10th Connecticut, 24th Massachusetts, 100th New York, and 206th Pennsylvania Infantry Regiments. In 1864, he participated in the Overland Campaign and the Siege of Petersburg.

On February 22, 1865, President Abraham Lincoln nominated Plaisted for appointment to the grade of brevet brigadier general of volunteers, to rank from February 21, 1865, and the United States Senate confirmed the appointment on March 3, 1865. On February 28, 1867, President Andrew Johnson nominated Plaisted for appointment to the grade of brevet major general of volunteers, to rank from March 13, 1865, and the United States Senate confirmed the appointment on March 2, 1867.

== Continued career ==
Following the war, Plaisted resumed practicing law in Bangor. He was elected to the Maine House of Representatives as a Republican, and served from 1867 to 1868. He was also a delegate to the 1868 Republican National Convention, and supported Ulysses S. Grant for the presidential nomination.

In January 1873, Plaisted was chosen by the state legislature to serve as Maine Attorney General, and he was reappointed in 1874 and 1875. During his tenure, Plaisted tried 14 capital cases, all of which resulted in convictions, and all of which were sustained on appeal.

In September 1875, Plaisted was chosen in a special election to serve in the Forty-fourth United States Congress, filling the vacancy caused by the death of Congressman Samuel F. Hersey. He served in the US House from September 13, 1875, to March 3, 1877, and resigned as Attorney General in December 1875 in order to attend the session of Congress that started later that month. He did not run for renomination in 1876, accepting the decision of a Republican district convention that voted to maintain an informal rotation system which mandated the selection of a nominee from Aroostook County. During Plaisted's tenure in the US House, his time and effort was concentrated on his service as a member of the committee that investigated the Whiskey Ring, a major scandal that came to light during the Grant administration.

After concluding his Congressional term, Plaisted resumed practicing law in Bangor. In partnership with attorney Frederick H. Appleton, he compiled and published The Maine Digest, a collection of Maine Supreme Judicial Court decisions from 1820 to 1879. In addition, he published accounts of two cases he handled as Attorney General, The Lowell Trial and The Wagner Trial. He also researched and compiled a genealogical and biographical history of the Plaisted family.

== Governorship ==
In 1878, events including wage cuts that precipitated the Great Railroad Strike of 1877 caused Plaisted to leave the Republican Party because of dissatisfaction with their monetary policy. As did many farmers and laborers, Plaisted opposed currency backed by gold and silver, arguing that it caused the post-Panic of 1873 deflation that reduced wages and prices paid to farmers, laborers, and producers of raw materials. Instead, he favored federal government-issued currency not backed by gold and silver, believing that this would prevent deflation and make business easier to transact by holding costs and salaries steady.

Both the national Republican and Democratic parties favored specie-backed currency issued by state-chartered banks. As a result of his unhappiness with the Republicans, Plaisted joined the new Greenback Party, and became their candidate for governor in 1880. He was also backed by pro-Greenback Democrats, and became the fusion candidate of both parties. Taking advantage of voter unhappiness caused by the lingering effects of the 1873 economic downturn, Plaisted prevailed over incumbent Republican Daniel F. Davis by fewer than 200 votes, becoming one of only four non-Republicans to hold the governorship between the founding of the party in the 1850s and the Great Depression in 1929. Plaisted served from 1881 to 1883, and was an unsuccessful candidate for reelection in 1882.

During Plaisted's term, the state legislature remained solidly Republican. As a result, legislators were able to block many of Plaisted's appointments, and he vetoed a much higher than normal number of bills, including 31 vetoes of measures to re-charter banks that issued specie-backed currency. By 1882, voter concern over the economic downturn that had begun in the 1870s had largely abated, and Plaisted was defeated for reelection by Republican Frederick Robie.

== Later life and death ==
From 1884 to 1898 Plaisted was editor and publisher of the New Age, a newspaper in Augusta. He used its editorial pages to convey his political views, and engaged in long-running debates with Republicans over their monetary policy, primarily Maine party leader James G. Blaine.

In his later years, Plaisted suffered from Bright's disease. He died in Bangor on January 31, 1898, and was buried at Mount Hope Cemetery in Bangor.

== Family ==
Plaisted was a member of a family long active in New Hampshire politics and government. His grandfather Samuel Plaisted was a judge during the early years of New Hampshire's statehood. Another ancestor, John Plaisted, was a member of the colonial legislature and a judge during the late 1600s and early 1700s.

Harris Plaisted was one of nine brothers and sisters. Among his siblings was William, who served in the Maine State Senate, and Charles, who served in the New Hampshire House of Representatives.

In 1858, Plaisted married Sarah J. Mason. She died in 1875, and in 1881 he married Mabel True Hill. With his first wife, Plaisted was the father of three children, including Frederick W. Plaisted, who served as governor from 1911 to 1912.

== See also ==
- List of American Civil War brevet generals (Union)

== Sources ==
=== Books ===
- Eicher, John H.; Eicher, David J. (2001). Civil War High Commands. Stanford, CA: Stanford University Press. ISBN 978-0-8047-3641-1.
- Gratwick, Harry (2011). Mainers in the Civil War. Mount Pleasant, SC: Arcadia Publishing. ISBN 978-1-59629-962-7.
- Maine Adjutant General (1882). Annual Report of the Adjutant General of the State of Maine for the Year Ending December 31, 1881. Augusta, ME: Sprague & Son.
- Spencer, Thomas E. (1998). Where They're Buried. Baltimore, MD: Clearfield Company. p. 415. ISBN 978-0-8063-4823-0.
- History of Penobscot County, Maine. Cleveland, OH: Williams, Chase & Co. 1882. p. 64.

Party political offices
Preceded by Alonzo Garcelon	Democratic nominee for Governor of Maine; 1880, 1882	Succeeded by John B. Redman
Preceded by Joseph L. Smith	Greenback nominee for Governor of Maine; 1880, 1882	Succeeded by Hosea B. Eaton
Legal offices
Preceded by Thomas Brackett Reed	Maine Attorney General; 1873–1875	Succeeded by Lucilius A. Emery
U.S. House of Representatives
Preceded by Samuel F. Hersey	Member of the U.S. House of Representatives from Maine's 4th congressional district September 13, 1875 – March 3, 1877	Succeeded by Llewellyn Powers
Political offices
Preceded by Daniel F. Davis	Governor of Maine; 1881–1883	Succeeded by Frederick Robie
