= Lot M. Morrill =

American politician (1813–1883)

Lot Morrill
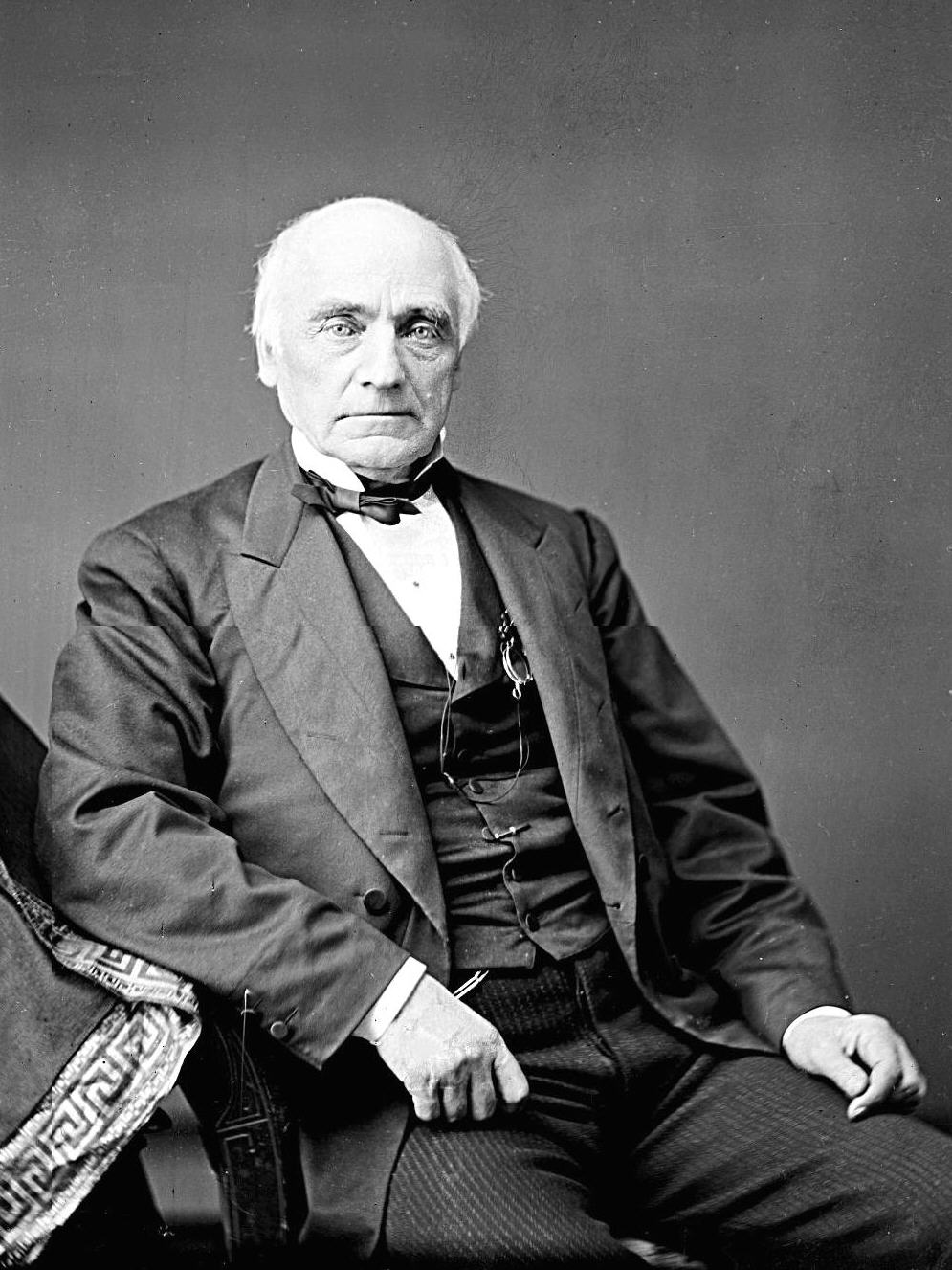
- Photograph by Mathew Brady, 1865–1880

31st United States Secretary of the Treasury
- In office July 7, 1876 – March 9, 1877
- President: Ulysses S. Grant; Rutherford B. Hayes
- Preceded by: Benjamin Bristow
- Succeeded by: John Sherman

United States Senator from Maine
- In office October 30, 1869 – July 7, 1876
- Preceded by: William P. Fessenden
- Succeeded by: James G. Blaine
- In office January 17, 1861 – March 3, 1869
- Preceded by: Hannibal Hamlin
- Succeeded by: Hannibal Hamlin

28th Governor of Maine
- In office January 6, 1858 – January 2, 1861
- Preceded by: Joseph H. Williams
- Succeeded by: Israel Washburn Jr.

President of the Maine Senate
- In office 1856
- Preceded by: Franklin Muzzy
- Succeeded by: Joseph H. Williams

Member of the Maine Senate
- In office 1856

Member of the Maine House of Representatives
- In office 1854

Personal details
- Born: Lot Myrick Morrill; May 3, 1813 Belgrade, Massachusetts, U.S. (now Maine)
- Died: January 10, 1883 (aged 69) Augusta, Maine, U.S.
- Party: Democratic (before 1856); Republican (1856–1883)
- Relatives: Anson Morrill (brother)
- Education: Waterville College

Lot Myrick Morrill (May 3, 1813 – January 10, 1883) was an American politician who served as the 28th governor of Maine, as a United States senator, and as U.S. secretary of the treasury under President Ulysses S. Grant. An advocate for hard currency rather than paper money, Morrill was popularly received as treasury secretary by the American press and Wall Street. He was known for financial and political integrity, and was said to be focused on serving the public good rather than party interests. Morrill was President Grant's fourth and last Secretary of the Treasury.

A native of Maine, Morrill received a public school education, briefly attended Waterville College, and became principal of a private school in New York. He then studied law and passed the bar in 1839, afterwards setting up law practices in Readfield and Augusta, Maine. Known for his eloquent speaking, Morrill was popular among Democratic friends advocating for temperance. Morrill was elected to the Maine House of Representatives in 1854 as a Democrat and served as chairman of the Maine Democratic Party. However, as the national divide over slavery grew during the 1850s, Morrill shifted his political allegiance to the Republican Party for the sole reason that Republicans opposed the expansion of slavery. He was elected as a Republican to the Maine Senate in 1856, followed by his election as governor of Maine in 1858.

As the American Civil War broke out in 1861, Morrill was elected to fill the U.S. Senate seat vacated by Maine's Hannibal Hamlin, who assumed the vice presidency under President Abraham Lincoln. Morrill's Senate tenure lasted nearly 15 years, spanning from the start of the Civil War to the waning days of Reconstruction. While in the Senate, Morrill sponsored legislation that outlawed slavery in Washington, D.C., and advocated for education and suffrage for African American freedmen.

In 1876, President Grant appointed Morrill to serve as U.S. treasury secretary after Secretary Benjamin Bristow resigned from the position. When Morrill left the Senate to lead the Treasury Department, his political rival James G. Blaine was appointed by Maine's governor to fill the then-vacant Senate seat. Morrill advocated strongly in support of the gold standard during his eight-month tenure as secretary. Upon his retirement from the Treasury Department in 1877, President Rutherford B. Hayes appointed Morrill as collector of customs in Portland, Maine, a position he held until his death in 1883.

== Early life ==
Lot Myrick Morrill was born on May 3, 1813, in Belgrade (in modern-day Maine, then a part of Massachusetts) to Peaslee and Nancy (Macomber) Morrill. He was of entirely English ancestry, his earliest immigrant ancestor was Abraham Morrill, who came to America from England in 1632 as part of the Great Puritan migration. The Morrill family was very large; Lot having been one of 14 children. His older brother Anson P. Morrill was a prominent U.S. statesman. After attending common school, Morrill taught at a local academy to earn money to go to college. At the age of 18, Morrill attended Waterville College. After briefly attending Waterville, Morrill served as principal of a private western New York college for a year. Morrill returned to Maine and studied law under Justice Fuller in Readfield. Morrill passed the bar in 1839, and built up a successful law practice. At this time Morrill began to associate with the Democratic Party and was popular speaker among his Democratic friends.

== State political career ==
Morrill entered politics as a speaker for early temperance movement in Maine and other political movements. In 1841, having become locally famous, Morrill moved to Augusta, Maine, where he spoke in front of Maine's capital legislative committees. As a speaker, Morrill gained much experience in state politics. Morrill started a law practice in Augusta; his partners were James W. Bradbury and Richard D. Rice. In 1849, Morrill became chairman of Maine's Democratic Party and served in this position until 1856. As a Democrat, Morrill was elected to Maine's House of Representatives in 1854.

Morrill began to break from his party's platform starting in 1855 eventually changing over to the Republican Party, having opposed Democratic concessions to slave states. During the 1856 presidential election, Morrill believed James Buchanan was a good candidate. However, he stated the Democratic Party's platform was "a flagrant outrage upon the country and an insult to the North". Morrill's change of political views were shared by his brother, Anson Morrill, and his friend and future Vice President Hannibal Hamlin.

Morrill completely severed ties with the Democratic Party and formally became a Republican in 1856. As a member of the Republican Party, Morrill was elected a Maine state senator in 1856, serving as the Senate's president. He was the first Republican to hold the position, which would be held by Republicans until 1964, with one brief exception. In 1858, Morrill was elected governor of Maine, a position his brother held a few years earlier. Morrill served as Maine's governor until January 1861 when he was elected to the U.S. Senate to replace Hamlin, who had left his seat to become Abraham Lincoln's running mate.

== U.S. Senator ==
=== Civil War ===
Morrill came into the U.S. Senate at a pivotal moment in history before the American Civil War. In 1861, Sen. Morrill argued strongly against compromise on the principles of slavery (via constitutional amendments) in order to restore the peace. In February 1861, Morrill attended the Peace Conference of 1861 and opposed John J. Crittenden's compromise arguments, similar to those made in the Crittenden Compromise. In March 1862, Morrill supported legislation that permitted the freedom of confiscated Confederate slaves captured during the War. Morrill believed this would be an effective military weapon against the Southern rebellion. In April 1862, Morrill spoke in favor of a bill that passed Congress; signed into law by President Abraham Lincoln that freed slaves in Washington, D.C. By the end of the war, he argued against punishing the southern states for the rebellion, and in favor of higher education for people of all races.

=== Reconstruction ===
During the Reconstruction era, Sen. Morrill forcefully advocated congressional Reconstruction that authorized the U.S. military in Southern sections of the United States to protect African American citizens.

On February 1, 1866, Morrill delivered a speech in Congress, which stated:

"I admit that this species of legislation Civil Rights Act of 1866 is absolutely revolutionary. But are we not in the midst of a revolution? Is the Senator from Kentucky utterly oblivious to the grand results of four years of war? Are we not in the midst of a civil and political revolution which has changed the fundamental principles of our government in some respects? ... There was a civilization based on servitude.... Where is that? ... Gone forever.... We have revolutionized this Constitution of ours to that extent and every substantial change in the fundamental constitution of a country is a revolution.

In June 1866, Morrill supported suffrage for African Americans in Washington, D.C. In 1868, Morrill voted for the impeachment of President Andrew Johnson; the other senator from Maine, William P. Fessenden, voted for Johnson's acquittal. In 1869, Morrill was defeated by his rival Hannibal Hamlin to the office of U.S. Senator from Maine by one vote. However, after Sen. Fessenden died in office in 1869, Morrill was appointed to replace Fessenden to serve out Fessenden's expired term. Morrill was elected to finish the term in 1871 and served until he was appointed Secretary of the Treasury in 1876 by President Ulysses S. Grant.

=== Committees ===
In the Senate he was the first chairman of the U.S. Senate Committee on Appropriations. He was also chairman of the U.S. Senate Committee to Audit and Control the Contingent Expense (38th and 39th Congresses), U.S. Senate Committee on the District of Columbia (39th Congress), the Committee on Appropriations (40th, 41st, 43rd and 44th Congresses) and the U.S. Senate Committee on the Library (41st and 42nd Congresses).

== Secretary of the Treasury ==
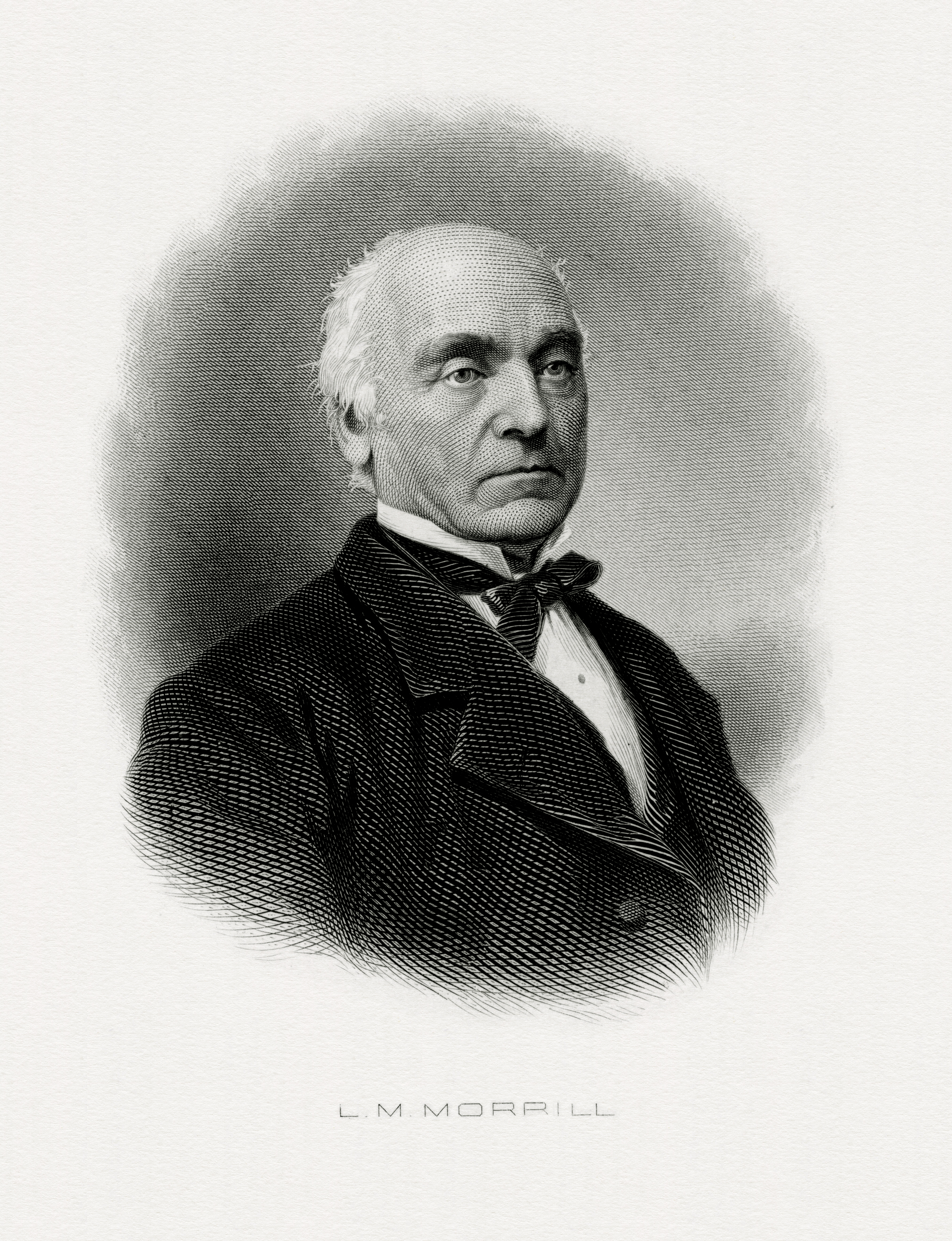
Bureau of Engraving and Printing portrait of Morrill as treasury secretary

Morrill was appointed Treasury Secretary by President Ulysses S. Grant; having served from 1876 to 1877 and for five days under President Rutherford B. Hayes. His appointment was in part due to the resignation of previous reformer Sec. Benjamin Bristow who successfully prosecuted and shut down the notorious Whiskey Ring scandal. Bristow resigned due to friction between himself and President Grant over Bristow's zealous reforming in the Treasury Department and potential presidential run in 1876. Sec. Morrill, upon his assumption to office, was in charge of all the top secret and confidential files left over during Bristow's Whiskey Ring prosecutions. Although Sec. Morrill did not have the reputation of a financial authority, he was believed to have political integrity and it was thought he would run the department as well as George S. Boutwell, Grant's first Treasury Secretary. Morrill upon his appointment submission by President Grant was immediately approved by the Senate without question. Morrill's appointment was popularly received by the press and Wall Street. Morrill's resignation from the Senate caused a vacancy which Gov. Seldon Connor filled by appointing Morrill's rival James G. Blaine as Maine's senator.

=== Currency redemption debate ===
During Morrill's tenure as Treasury Secretary, debate continued over the return to currency that could be redeemed for gold versus continuing to issue inflationary greenback paper currency. Like his predecessor Bristow, Morrill advocated for the gold standard, having viewed paper money as "irredeemable and inconvertible" and "essentially repugnant to the principles of the Constitution". Paper money, however, was popular in the South and West, where cheap capital was seen as necessary for economic expansion. Since the Specie Payment Resumption Act of 1875 required the Treasury Department to pay gold specie in exchange for greenbacks starting in 1879, Morrill advised Congress to increase the government's gold supply leading up to that date.

== Later career ==
Following his term in the Grant administration, he returned to Maine and became Collector of Customs for the Port of Portland, Maine.

Morrill died in 1883 in Augusta, Maine, leaving his wife Charlotte and four daughters. He was interred at Forest Grove Cemetery in that city. His Augusta home is listed on the National Register of Historic Places.

== Legacy ==
The revenue cutter USRC Morrill was named after him.

Party political offices
| Preceded by Hannibal Hamlin | Republican nominee for Governor of Maine; 1857, 1858, 1859 | Succeeded by Israel Washburn Jr. |
Political offices
| Preceded by Joseph H. Williams | Governor of Maine; 1858–1861 | Succeeded by Israel Washburn Jr. |
| Preceded by Benjamin Bristow | United States Secretary of the Treasury; 1876–1877 | Succeeded by John Sherman |
U.S. Senate
| Preceded by Hannibal Hamlin | U.S. Senator (Class 1) from Maine; 1861–1869; Served alongside: William P. Fessenden, Nathan A. Farwell, William P. Fessenden | Succeeded by Hannibal Hamlin |
| New office | Chair of the Senate Appropriations Committee; 1867–1869 | Succeeded by William P. Fessenden |
| Preceded by William P. Fessenden | U.S. Senator (Class 1) from Maine; 1869–1876; Served alongside: Hannibal Hamlin | Succeeded by James G. Blaine |
| Preceded by William P. Fessenden | Chair of the Senate Appropriations Committee; 1869–1871 | Succeeded by Cornelius Cole |
| Preceded by Cornelius Cole | Chair of the Senate Appropriations Committee; 1873–1876 | Succeeded by William Windom |
