= 1877 Maine gubernatorial election =

- September 10, 1877
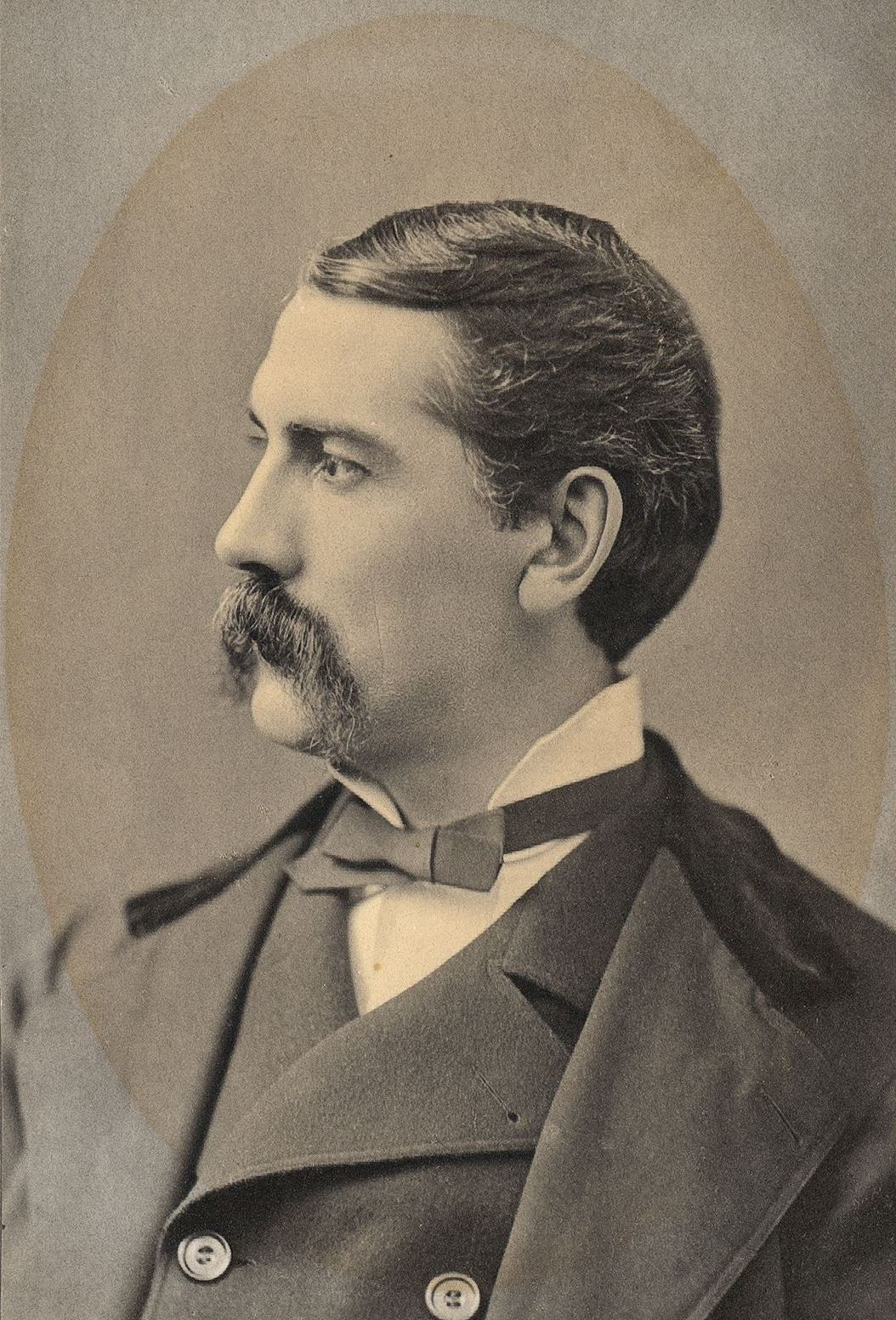

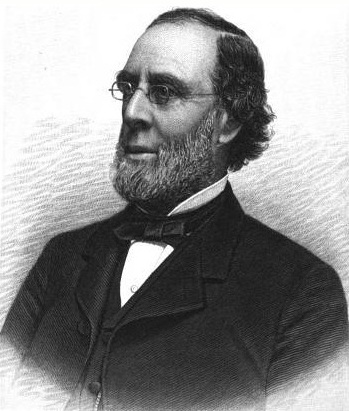

| Nominee | Seldon Connor | Joseph H. Williams | Henry C. Munson |
| Party | Republican | Democratic | Greenback |
| Popular vote | 53,585 | 42,311 | 5,291 |
| Percentage | 52.50% | 41.46% | 5.18% |
- County results Connor: 40–50% 50–60% 60–70% Williams: 50–60%
Governor before election
Seldon Connor
Republican
Elected Governor
Seldon Connor
Republican

The 1877 Maine gubernatorial election was held on September 10, 1877. Incumbent Republican governor Seldon Connor defeated Democratic nominee and former governor Joseph H. Williams and Greenback nominee Henry C. Munson.

== General election ==
=== Candidates ===
==== Republican ====
- Seldon Connor

==== Democratic ====
- Joseph H. Williams

==== Greenback ====
- Henry C. Munson

=== Results ===
1877 Maine gubernatorial election
| Party | Candidate | Votes | % | ±% |
|---|---|---|---|---|
| Republican | Seldon Connor (incumbent) | 53,585 | 52.50% | |
| Democratic | Joseph H. Williams | 42,311 | 41.46% | |
| Greenback | Henry C. Munson | 5,291 | 5.18% | |
