= 1874 Maine gubernatorial election =

- September 14, 1874
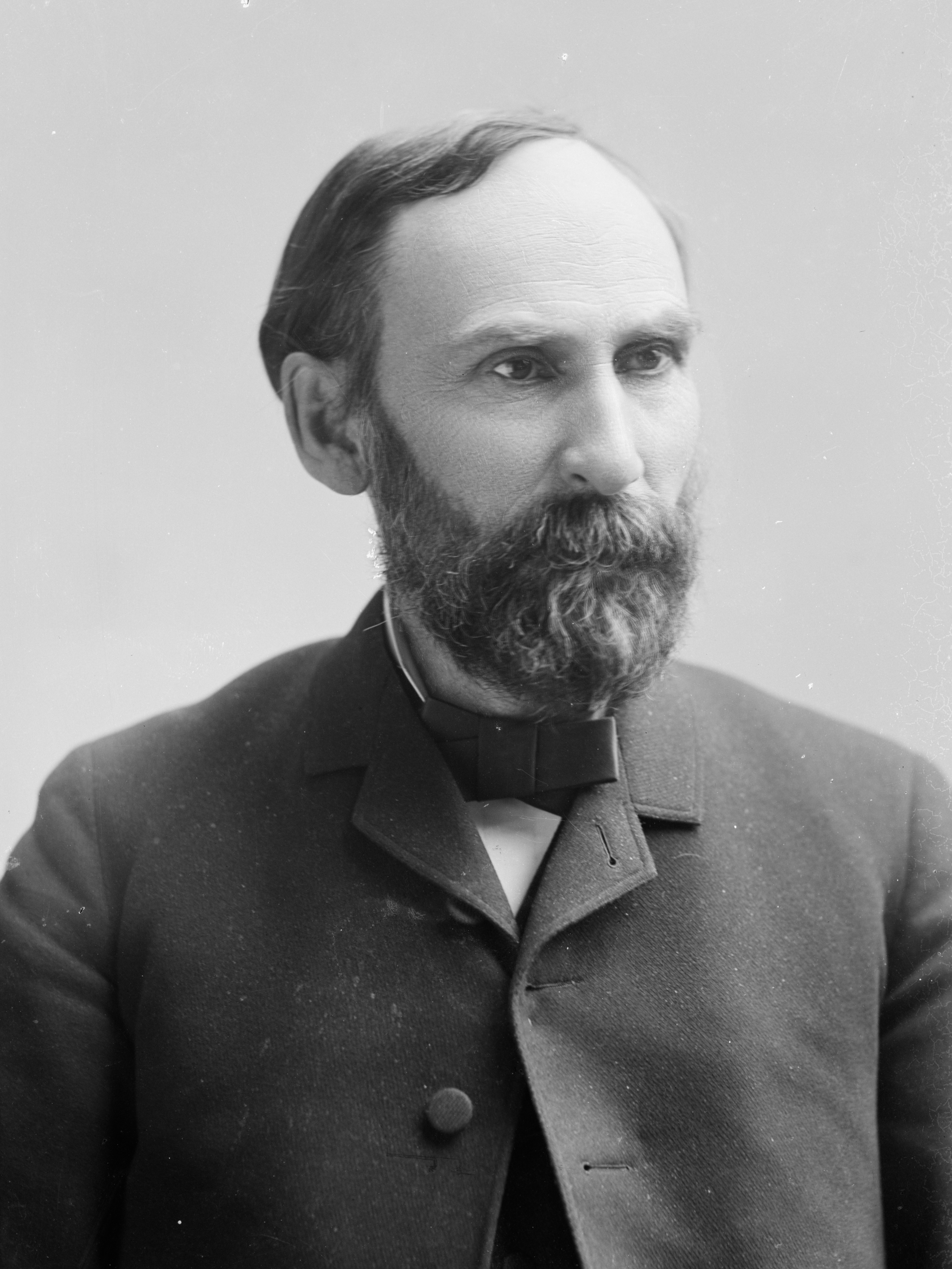

Nominee	Nelson Dingley Jr.	Joseph Titcomb
Party	Republican	Democratic
Popular vote	50,865	41,898
Percentage	54.57%	44.95%
- County results Dingley: 50–60% 60–70% Titcomb: 50–60%
Governor before election
Nelson Dingley Jr.
Republican
Elected Governor
Nelson Dingley Jr.
Republican

The 1874 Maine gubernatorial election was held on September 14, 1874. Republican candidate Nelson Dingley Jr. defeated the Democratic candidate Joseph Titcomb.

== General election ==
=== Candidates ===
==== Republican ====
- Nelson Dingley Jr.

==== Democratic ====
- Joseph Titcomb

=== Results ===
1874 Maine gubernatorial election
Party	Candidate	Votes	%	±%
Republican	Nelson Dingley Jr. (incumbent)	50,865	54.57%	
Democratic	Joseph Titcomb	41,898	44.95%	
