= 1873 Maine gubernatorial election =

- September 8, 1873
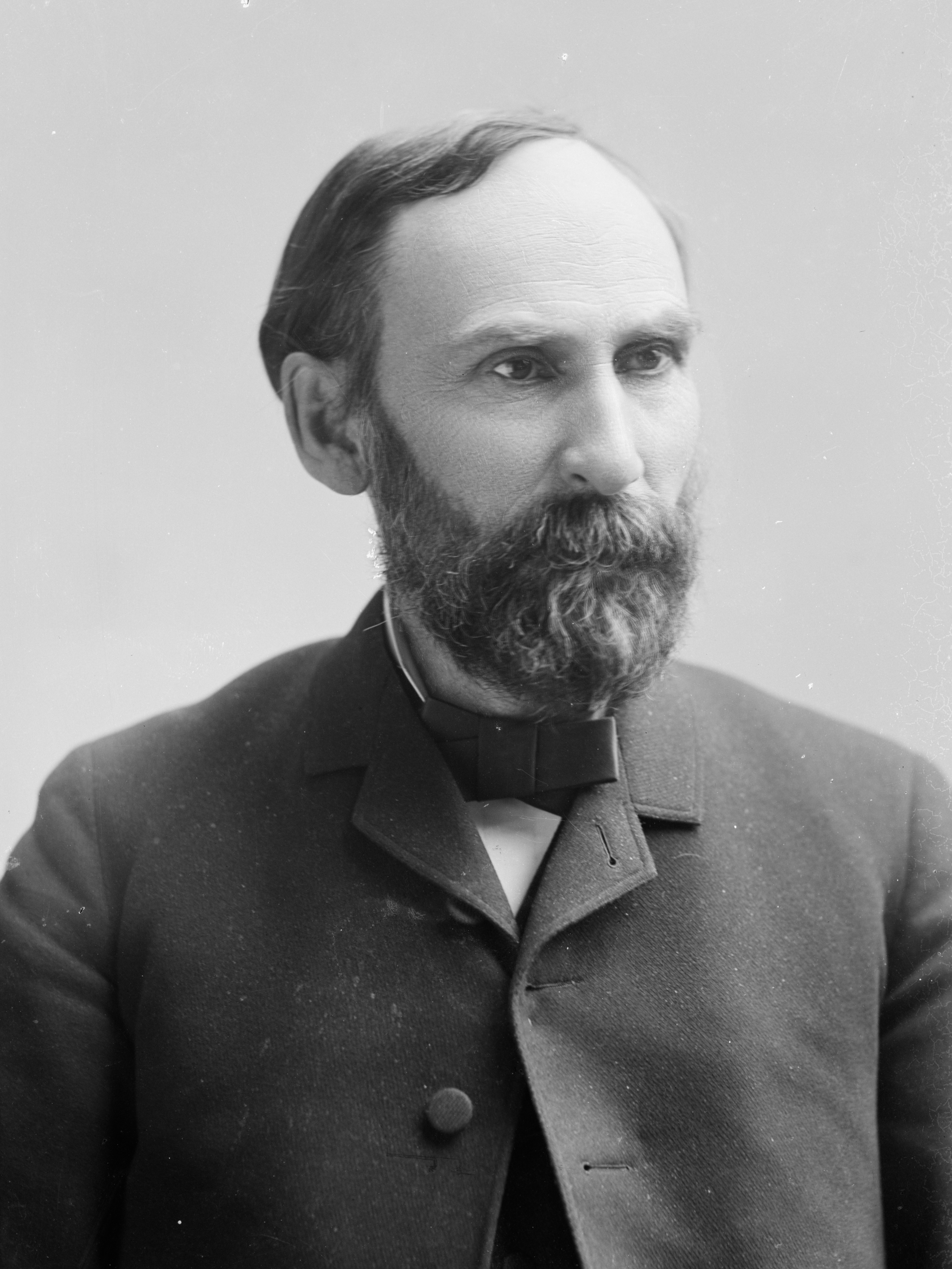

Nominee	Nelson Dingley Jr.	Joseph Titcomb
Party	Republican	Democratic
Popular vote	45,239	32,924
Percentage	55.88%	40.67%
- County results Dingley: 50–60% 60–70% Titcomb: 50–60%
Governor before election
Sidney Perham
Republican
Elected Governor
Nelson Dingley Jr.
Republican

The 1873 Maine gubernatorial election was held on September 8, 1873. Republican candidate Nelson Dingley Jr. defeated the Democratic candidate Joseph Titcomb.

== General election ==
=== Candidates ===
==== Republican ====
- Nelson Dingley Jr.

==== Democratic ====
- Joseph Titcomb

=== Results ===
1873 Maine gubernatorial election
Party	Candidate	Votes	%	±%
Republican	Nelson Dingley Jr.	45,239	55.88%	
Democratic	Joseph Titcomb	32,924	40.67%	
