= 1870 Maine gubernatorial election =

- September 12, 1870
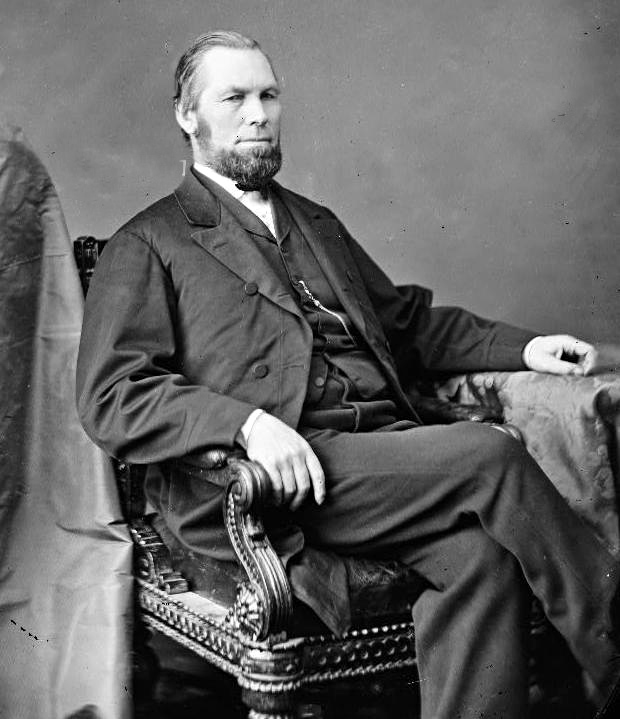

Nominee	Sidney Perham	Charles W. Roberts
Party	Republican	Democratic
Popular vote	54,019	45,732
Percentage	54.13%	45.83%
- County results Perham: 50–60% 60–70% Roberts: 50–60%
Governor before election
Joshua Chamberlain
Republican
Elected Governor
Sidney Perham
Republican

The 1870 Maine gubernatorial election was held on September 12, 1870. Republican candidate Sidney Perham defeated the Democratic candidate Charles W. Roberts.

== General election ==
=== Candidates ===
==== Republican ====
- Sidney Perham

==== Democratic ====
- Charles W. Roberts

=== Results ===
1870 Maine gubernatorial election
Party	Candidate	Votes	%	±%
Republican	Sidney Perham	54,019	54.13%	
Democratic	Charles W. Roberts	45,732	45.83%	
