= John C. Talbot =

American politician

John Coffin Talbot

Member of the Maine Senate
- In office 1836–1837

Personal details
- Born: 1784
- Died: 1860 (aged 75–76)
- Party: Democrat
- Profession: Businessperson

John Coffin Talbot (1784–1860) was an American businessperson and politician from Maine. Talbot, a Democrat, served 6 one-year terms in the Maine Legislature, including two in the Maine House of Representatives (1825; 1831) and four in the Maine Senate (1832-1833; 1836-1837). In his 4th and final Senate term, Talbot was elected Senate President.

Talbot was also successful in the lumber business. He was a resident of East Machias, Maine.

Talbot's son, John C. Talbot, Jr. served for many years in the Legislature, including as Speaker of the Maine House of Representatives from 1853 to 1854. In 1876, he was the Democratic Party's nominee for Governor.

Party political offices
Preceded by Charles W. Roberts	Democratic nominee for Governor of Maine; 1876	Succeeded by Joseph H. Williams
