= Warren H. Vinton =

American politician (1825–1907)

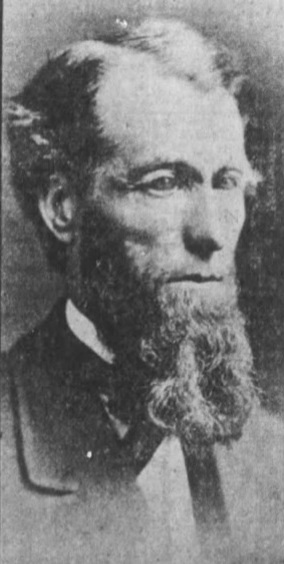
Vinton in 1903

Warren H. Vinton (1825 – March 13, 1907) was an American politician from Maine. Vinton represented Gray, Maine, in the Maine House of Representatives and was elected from Cumberland County to the Maine Senate in five separate elections. In 1878, Vinton was elected Senate President.

A Republican, Vinton ran for governor as an Independent Republican in 1882. He received only 289 votes and finished in 5th and last place to Republican Frederick Robie. Upon losing, Vinton became a Democrat.

Vinton was born Warren Whitefield Bessey, but changed his name in 1846 to Warren Howard Vinton, after a neighbor who raised him. His parents were Warren and Margery Bessey. He died on March 13, 1907, at his house in Gray.
