= Seldon Connor =

American politician (1839–1917)

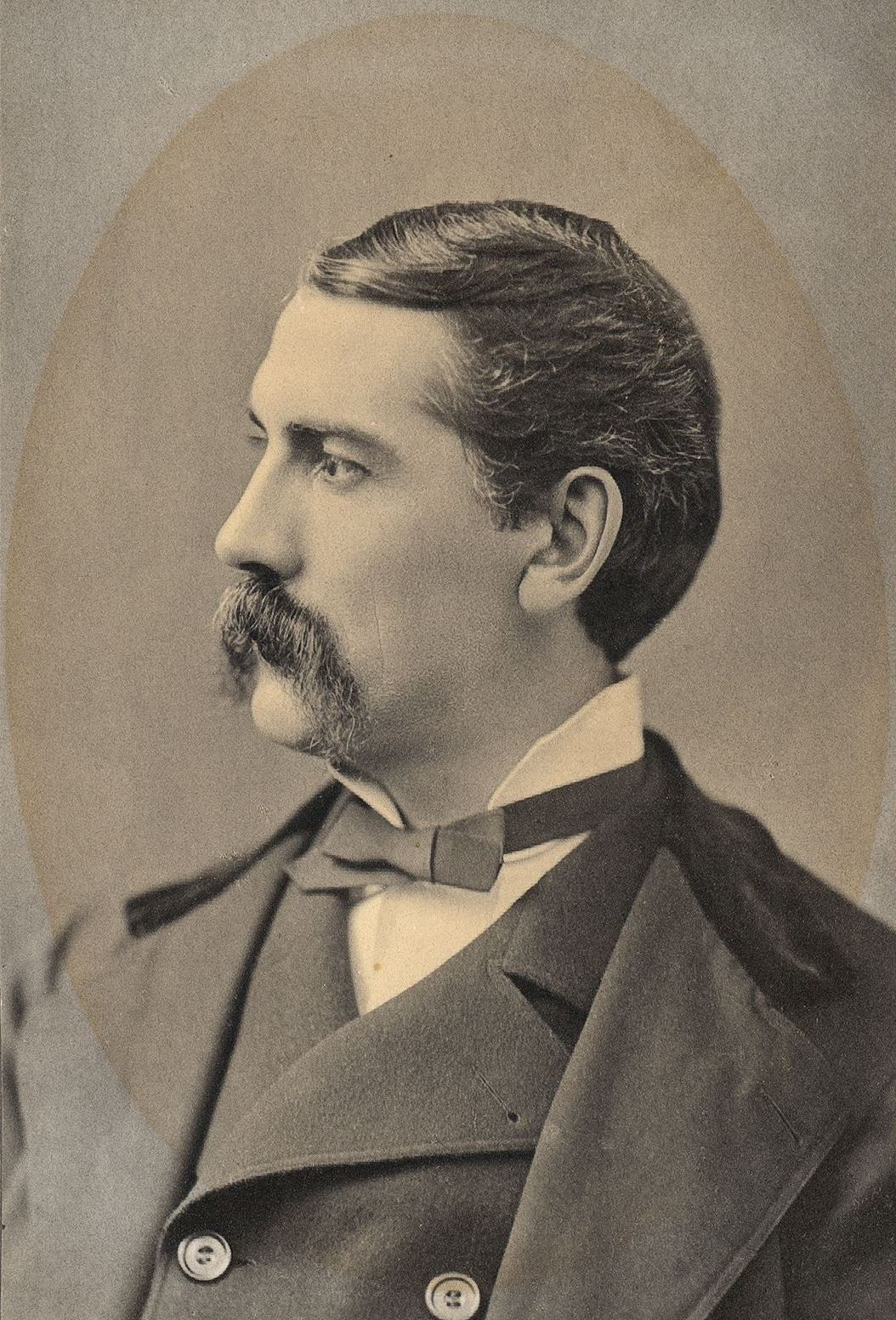
- Connor, c. 1870s

35th Governor of Maine
- In office January 5, 1876 – January 8, 1879
- Preceded by: Nelson Dingley Jr.
- Succeeded by: Alonzo Garcelon

Personal details
- Born: January 25, 1839 Fairfield, Maine, U.S.
- Died: July 9, 1917 (aged 78) Augusta, Maine, U.S.
- Resting place: Forest Grove Cemetery, Augusta, Maine
- Spouse: Henrietta Bailey (m. 1869)
- Children: 2
- Education: Tufts College
- Occupation: Businessman; Government official

Military service
- Allegiance: Union (American Civil War); Maine
- Branch/service: Union Army; Maine National Guard
- Years of service: 1861–1866 (Army); 1893–1897 (National Guard)
- Rank: Brigadier General (Army); Major General (National Guard)
- Unit: 1st Vermont Infantry; 7th Maine Infantry
- Commands: 19th Maine Volunteer Infantry Regiment; 1st Brigade, 2nd Division, II Corps; Maine National Guard
- Battles/wars: American Civil War

Seldon Connor (January 25, 1839 – July 9, 1917) was an American soldier, banker, and politician. A Union Army veteran of the American Civil War and a Republican, from 1876 to 1879 he served as the 35th governor of Maine.

A native of Fairfield, Maine, Connor graduated from Tufts College in 1859 and began to study law at the Woodstock, Vermont firm of Peter T. Washburn. At the start of the American Civil War in 1861, he joined the 1st Vermont Infantry, a unit raised for three months of service that included Washburn as second-in-command. Connor took part in action with the 1st Vermont, including the Battle of Big Bethel and was discharged in August. He immediately joined a new unit, the 7th Maine Infantry, as second-in-command and received a commission as a lieutenant colonel. He took part in engagements including the Peninsula campaign, Battle of Antietam, and Battle of Fredericksburg, and was wounded at Fredericksburg. He was promoted to colonel in January 1864 and appointed to command the 19th Maine Infantry. He was severely wounded at the Battle of the Wilderness, and spent more than a year recuperating, during which he was promoted to brigadier general.

After the war, Connor returned to Maine, where he served as a US revenue collector from 1870 to 1875, when he resigned so he could accept his party's nomination for governor. He was elected in 1875 and reelected in 1876 and 1877. In 1878, he won a plurality but an economic downturn enabled a Greenback Party candidate to gain traction and Connor was defeated in the state legislature's vote after Greenback legislators agreed to back the Democratic nominee.

After leaving the governorship, Connor was involved in business interests including serving as president of the Northern Banking Company of Portland. He served as US pension agent for Maine from 1882 to 1886 and 1897 to 1913, and was adjutant general of the Maine National Guard from 1893 to 1897. In retirement, Connor lived in Augusta, where he died on July 9, 1917. He was buried at Forest Grove Cemetery in Augusta.

== Early life ==
Seldon Connor (also spelled "Selden") was born in Fairfield, Maine on January 25, 1839, the son of William Connor and Mary Elizabeth (Bryant) Connor. He was educated at the academy in Hartland, Maine and Westbrook Seminary of Westbrook, Maine. He then attended Tufts College, from which he graduated in 1859 with a Bachelor of Arts degree. While in college he became a member of the Zeta Psi fraternity and Phi Beta Kappa.

After college, Connor moved to Woodstock, Vermont, where he studied law with the firm of Peter T. Washburn and Charles P. Marsh. In May 1861, he enlisted for the American Civil War when he joined the Union Army's 1st Vermont Infantry. Washburn was the regiment's second-in-command and de facto commander, and Connor served with the 1st Vermont during its three months of service at Fortress Monroe and Newport News, Virginia. He also participated in the 1st Vermont's combat at the Battle of Big Bethel on June 10, 1861 and was mustered out with the regiment on August 15, 1861.

== Start of career ==
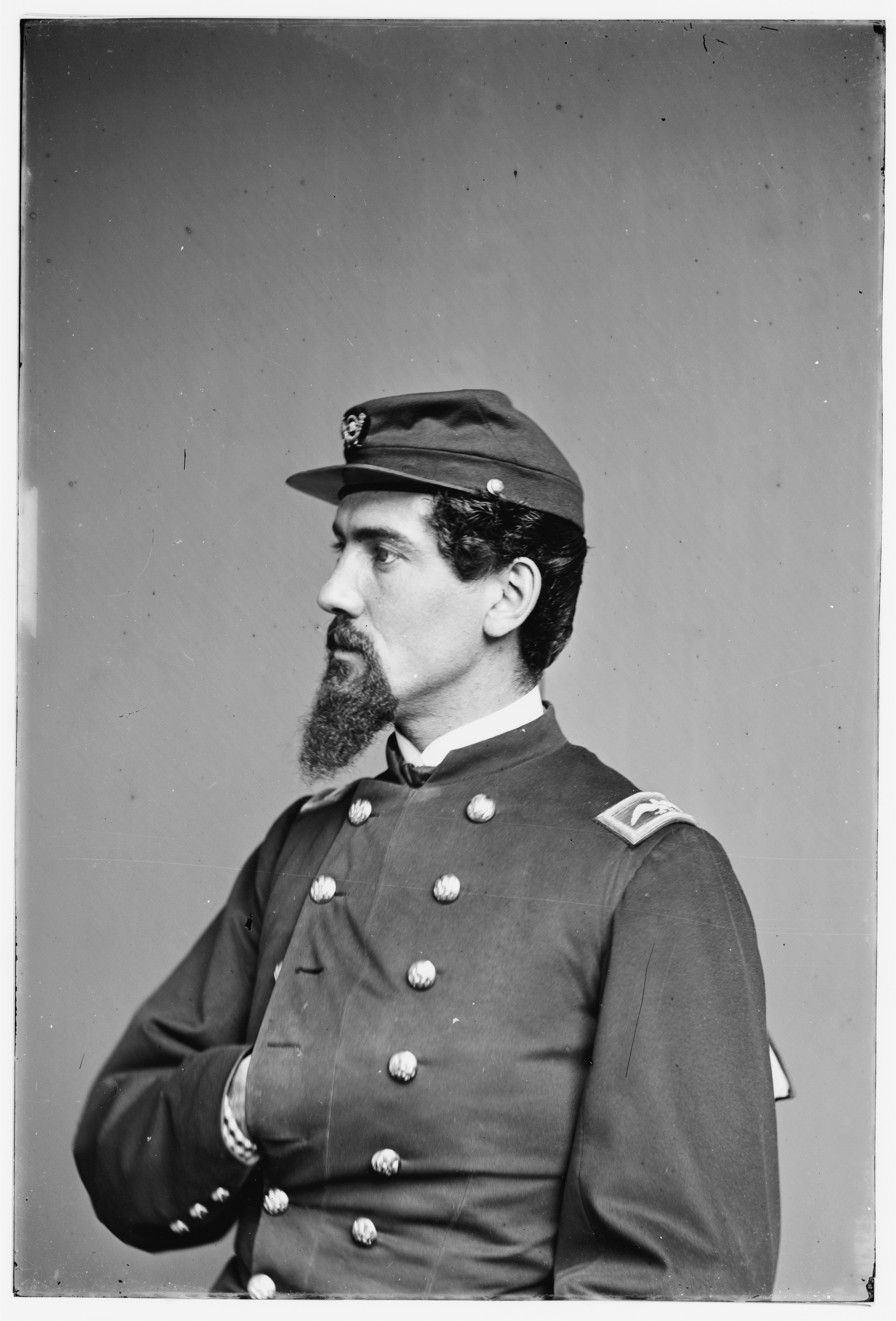
Connor as commander of the 19th Maine in 1864

On August 22, 1861, Connor was commissioned as lieutenant colonel and second-in-command of the 7th Maine Infantry. He took part in the Union's Peninsula campaign of March to July 1862, as well as the Battle of Antietam in September 1862 and the Battle of Fredericksburg the following December. Connor was wounded at Fredericksburg, but remained with his regiment, and at times served as its acting commander. Connor was also with the 7th Maine during its participation in the July 1863 Battle of Gettysburg. In January 1864, Connor was promoted to colonel and assigned to command the 19th Maine Infantry. Because his brigade commander frequently acted as a division commander, Connor acted as commander of 1st Brigade, 2nd Division, II Corps. He led his regiment during the May 1864 Battle of the Wilderness, at which he was severely wounded when a bullet shattered his thigh bone.

Connor spent more than a year recovering in Washington, D.C. hospitals and was bedridden for much of the time. While he was hospitalized, Maine newspapers incorrectly reported that he had died in combat; corrections were issued several days later. In June 1864, he was promoted to brigadier general, but his convalescence prevented him from actively exercising the responsibilities of the rank. He returned to Maine in August 1865 and was mustered out of the army in April 1866. After the war, Connor remained active in the Military Order of the Loyal Legion of the United States, Grand Army of the Republic, Society of the Army of the Potomac, and Society of American Wars. From 1866 to 1867, Connor was president of the Maine State Soldiers' and Sailors' Union, a fraternal advocacy organization for Civil War veterans. He was a sought after orator, and frequently gave speeches at the dedications of memorials and monuments to Maine's wartime service.

== Continued career ==
Connor re-injured his leg in a fall soon after returning home, and spent almost two years convalescing. He used crutches for the rest of his life, and his wounds also left him susceptible to kidney infections and other ailments which required frequent medical care. In 1868, he was appointed US collector of federal revenue for Maine's 3rd district, and he held this position until the post was abolished in 1870. The position was eliminated when federal revenue districts were consolidated under one statewide collector, an appointment which Connor received. He held this position until 1875, when he resigned in order to accept the Republican nomination for governor of Maine. In 1873, Connor was elected to a one year term as president of the Tufts College Alumni Association.

Connor won the September 1875 election for a one year term as Maine's governor, and he was reelected in 1876 and 1877, and served from January 1876 to January 1879. During Connor's governorship, he advocated for civil service reform, endorsed the resumption of specie rather than paper money for payment of debts, and promoted expansion of the state's public school system. Connor was also a proponent of continuing the state's law banning the sale of alcohol and for eliminating land grants as an incentive for railroad construction. In 1876, Connor received the honorary degree of LL.D. from Tufts College.

In 1878, Connor was a candidate for reelection, but a downturn in the economy, the Long Depression, had given rise to the pro-paper currency Greenback Party. In a three way race between Connor, Democratic nominee Alonzo Garcelon, and Greenbacker Joseph L. Smith, Connor obtained a plurality, receiving 44.8 percent of the vote to Garcelon's 22.4 and Smith's 32.8. Because no candidate had a majority, the election was decided by the Maine legislature, where a fusion of Democrats and Greenbackers elected Garcelon.

== Later career ==
After leaving office, Connor was active in business and civic endeavors, including appointments as manager of Maine and Vermont operations for the New York Life Insurance Company, president of the Northern Banking Company of Portland and trustee of the Bath Military and Orphan Asylum. He remained active in politics as a Republican, including making campaign speeches on behalf of James A. Garfield for president in 1880, and James G. Blaine for president in 1884. From 1882 to 1886, Connor served as Maine's U.S. pension agent, responsible for adjudicating the pension applications of Union veterans and their widows and disbursing their payments.

In January 1893, Connor was appointed to succeed Henry M. Sprague as adjutant general of the Maine National Guard with the rank of brigadier general and he attained promotion to major general during his term. He resigned in April 1897 and was succeeded by John T. Richards. Connor resigned as adjutant general to accept a new appointment as US pension agent for Maine in 1897 and he served until 1913, when pension agents were abolished in favor of a centralized payment system.

In retirement, Connor resided in Augusta, Maine. He died in Augusta on July 9, 1917. At the time of his death, he was one of only nine surviving Union Army brigadier generals. Connor was buried at Forest Grove Cemetery in Augusta.

== See also ==
- List of American Civil War generals (Union)

== Bibliography ==
- "Biography, Selden Connor, 1839-1917". Maine.gov. Augusta, Maine: Maine State Archives. April 29, 1999. Archived from the original on March 16, 2008.
- Connor, Seldon (1909). An Address By Seldon Connor In Commemoration of the One Hundredth Anniversary of the Birth of Hannibal Hamlin. Bangor, Maine: The Thos. W. Burke Printing Co. – via HathiTrust.
- Connor, Seldon; Johnson, Rossiter (1896). "Camp Life". Campfire and Battlefield. New York: Knight & Brown. pp. 495–505 – via Google Books.

Party political offices
Preceded by Nelson Dingley Jr.	Republican nominee for Governor of Maine; 1875, 1876, 1877, 1878	Succeeded by Daniel F. Davis
Political offices
Preceded by Nelson Dingley Jr.	Governor of Maine; 1876–1879	Succeeded by Alonzo Garcelon
