= Nelson Dingley Jr. =

Journalist and politician (1832–1899)

Nelson Dingley
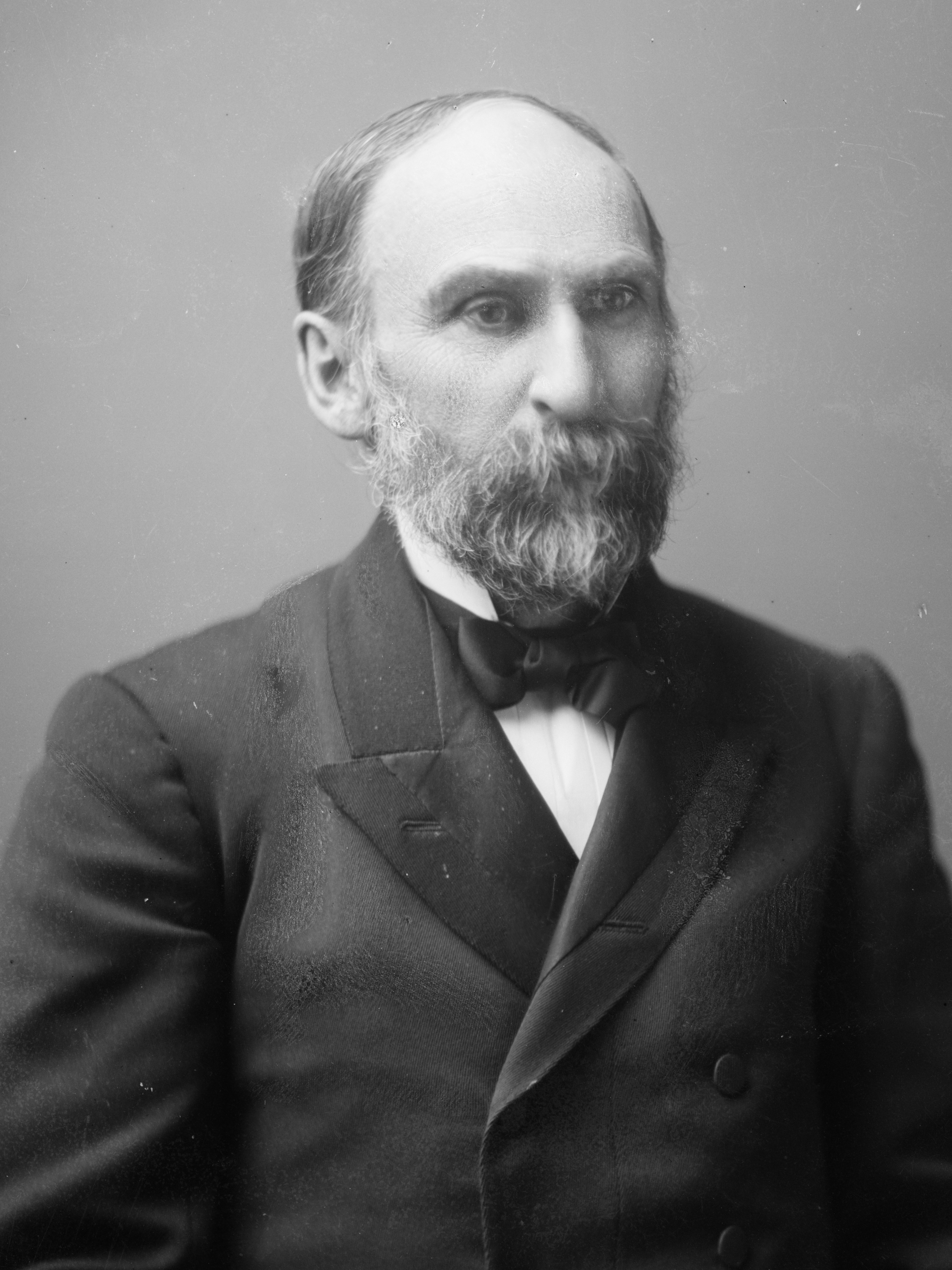
- Dingley c. 1894–1899

Member of the U.S. House of Representatives from Maine's 2nd district
- In office September 12, 1881 – January 13, 1899
- Preceded by: William P. Frye
- Succeeded by: Charles E. Littlefield

34th Governor of Maine
- In office January 7, 1874 – January 5, 1876
- Preceded by: Sidney Perham
- Succeeded by: Seldon Connor

Personal details
- Born: February 15, 1832 Durham, Maine, U.S.
- Died: January 13, 1899 (aged 66) Washington, D.C., U.S.
- Party: Republican
- Education: Colby College; Dartmouth College (BA)

Nelson Dingley Jr. (February 15, 1832 – January 13, 1899) was a journalist and politician from the U.S. state of Maine.

Dingley was born in Durham, Maine and attended the common schools at Unity, Maine and Waterville College (now Colby College). He graduated from Dartmouth College in Hanover, New Hampshire, in 1855, where he was a founding member of the Psi Epsilon chapter of Zeta Psi fraternity. He then studied law, received an LL.D. from Bates College, and was admitted to the bar in 1856. However, he never practiced law and instead became proprietor and editor of the Lewiston, Maine Journal, holding this post for more than twenty years. He was a member of the Maine House of Representatives 1862–1865, 1868, and again in 1873, serving as speaker in 1863 and 1864. He was the 34th governor of Maine in 1874 and a delegate to the Republican National Convention in 1876 and 1880.

Dingley was elected as a Republican to the 47th Congress to fill the vacancy caused by the resignation of William P. Frye. He was then reelected to the 48th and to the seven succeeding Congresses, serving from September 12, 1881, until his death in Washington, D.C., before the close of the 55th Congress. Reputedly "destitute of humor but soundly versed in finance", Dingley was chairman of the U.S. House Committee on Ways and Means in the 54th and 55th Congresses. The tariff schedule of 1897, known as the Dingley Tariff, was framed under his direction to repeal and reverse the lower rates set forth in the 1894 Democratic Wilson–Gorman Tariff Act. The Dingley Tariff raised tariff rates and granted the President authority to invoke reciprocity when negotiating trade treaties.

Dingley had been reelected to the 56th Congress and was succeeded by Charles E. Littlefield upon his death in Washington, D.C., on January 13, 1899. He is interred in Oak Hill Cemetery, near Auburn, Maine.

== See also ==
- List of members of the United States Congress who died in office (1790–1899)

Party political offices
Preceded by Sidney Perham	Republican nominee for Governor of Maine; 1873, 1874	Succeeded by Seldon Connor
Political offices
Preceded by Sidney Perham	Governor of Maine; 1874–1876	Succeeded by Seldon Connor
U.S. House of Representatives
Preceded by William P. Frye	Member of the U.S. House of Representatives from Maine's 2nd congressional district 1881–1899	Succeeded by Charles E. Littlefield
Preceded by William Wilson	Chair of the House Ways and Means Committee; 1895–1899	Succeeded by Sereno E. Payne
