= List of elections in 1878 =

The following elections occurred in the year 1878.

== Europe ==
=== United Kingdom ===
- 1878 Argyllshire by-election
- 1878 Belfast by-election
- 1878 Boston by-election
- 1878 Bristol by-election
- 1878 Canterbury by-election
- 1878 Carmarthen Boroughs by-election
- 1878 Cirencester by-election
- 1878 Down by-election
- 1878 East Somerset by-election
- 1878 Flint Boroughs by-election
- 1878 Greenock by-election
- 1878 Haddington Burghs by-election
- 1878 Hereford by-election
- 1878 Leith Burghs by-election
- 1878 Londonderry County by-election
- 1878 Maldon by-election
- 1878 Marlborough by-election
- 1878 Mid Somerset by-election
- 1878 Middlesbrough by-election
- 1878 Middlesex by-election
- 1878 New Ross by-election
- 1878 Newcastle-under-Lyme by-election
- 1878 North Lancashire by-election
- 1878 North Staffordshire by-election
- 1878 Oxford University by-election
- 1878 Oxfordshire by-election
- 1878 Perth by-election
- 1878 Perthshire by-election
- 1878 Peterborough by-election
- 1878 Reading by-election
- 1878 Rochester by-election
- 1878 South Northumberland by-election
- 1878 Southampton by-election
- 1878 Tamworth by-election
- 1878 Truro by-election
- 1878 West Kent by-election
- 1878 Worcester by-election
- 1878 York by-election

=== Rest of Europe ===
- 1878 Belgian general election
- 1878 Hungarian parliamentary election
- 1878 German federal election
- 1878 Liechtenstein general election
- 1878 Luxembourg general election
- 1878 Portuguese legislative election
- 1878 Serbian parliamentary election
- 1878 Swedish general election
- 1878 Swiss federal election
- 1878 conclave

== North America ==
- 1878 Newfoundland general election

=== Canada ===
- 1878 British Columbia general election
- 1878 Canadian federal election and 12 By-elections to the 4th Canadian Parliament
- 1878 Manitoba general election
- 1878 New Brunswick general election
- 1878 Newfoundland general election
- 1878 Nova Scotia general election
- 1878 Quebec general election

=== United States ===
- 1878 New York state election
- 1878 United States elections

==== United States House of Representatives ====
- 1878 United States House of Representatives elections
- United States House of Representatives elections in California, 1878
- United States House of Representatives elections in Florida, 1878
- United States House of Representatives elections in Maine, 1878
- United States House of Representatives elections in South Carolina, 1878

==== United States lieutenant gubernatorial ====
- 1878 Connecticut lieutenant gubernatorial election
- 1878 Nebraska lieutenant gubernatorial election
- 1878 Texas lieutenant gubernatorial election

==== United States gubernatorial ====
- 1878 Alabama gubernatorial election
- 1878 Arkansas gubernatorial election
- 1878 Colorado gubernatorial election
- 1878 Connecticut gubernatorial election
- 1878 Delaware gubernatorial election
- 1878 Kansas gubernatorial election
- 1878 Maine gubernatorial election
- 1878 Massachusetts gubernatorial election
- 1878 Michigan gubernatorial election
- 1878 Nebraska gubernatorial election
- 1878 Nevada gubernatorial election
- March 1878 New Hampshire gubernatorial election
- November 1878 New Hampshire gubernatorial election
- 1878 Oregon gubernatorial election
- 1878 Pennsylvania gubernatorial election
- 1878 Rhode Island gubernatorial election
- 1878 South Carolina gubernatorial election
- 1878 Texas gubernatorial election
- 1878 Vermont gubernatorial election

==== United States mayoral elections ====
- 1878 Boston mayoral election
- March 1878 Manchester, New Hampshire mayoral election
- November 1878 Manchester, New Hampshire mayoral election

== See also ==
- Category:1878 elections
