= E. J. Dawne =

American judge

Judge of the United States Territorial Court for the District of Alaska
- In office August 20, 1885 – September 23, 1885
- Appointed by: Grover Cleveland
- Preceded by: Ward McAllister Jr.
- Succeeded by: Lafayette Dawson

Personal details
- Born: Edward J. Dawne c. 1844 Virginia
- Died: possibly 1885/1886 possibly 1905 or later
- Party: Democratic
- Spouse: Jennie Miller
- Children: 2 sons

Edward J. Dawne (c. 1844 – disappeared December 19, 1885), known as E. J. Dawne, was a Southern Methodist preacher who secured an appointment as Judge of the United States Territorial Court for the District of Alaska in 1885 before fleeing the country to escape forgery and embezzlement charges.

== Career ==
Dawne was born around 1844 in Virginia, and began preaching in Fayetteville, Arkansas, in 1869. By 1872, he had transferred to Dardanelle, Arkansas, and he was transferred to Salem, Oregon that year. In 1874, he was "tried, silenced and suspended" from the church at its annual state conference. He quickly assumed leadership positions in his new community, serving on the board of trustees of Corvallis State Agricultural College in 1873–1874.

In 1874, he was the Democratic nominee for Superintendent of Public Instruction, a race which he lost by 40 votes. Upon moving to Salem, he had claimed to be a medical doctor, which was shown to be false at the end of the 1874 campaign. He had also been given a faculty seat in the medical department of Willamette University. He first claimed to hold a medical degree from the University of Louisiana, but his name was not found among its list of graduates, and then claimed to have graduated from the nonexistent Mountain Home University. He then claimed to hold a medical degree from Oglethorpe University, and that the degree had been left behind in Virginia, sent for, and received, but local media found that the university had, at that point in time, never had a medical school. During the campaign, he also claimed to have been a Lieutenant Colonel in the Confederate Army.

He married Jennie Miller, a graduate of Willamette University and daughter of Salem community leader William "Scotch" Miller, and they began operating St. Paul's Academy in 1874. Dawne had two sons, William S. Dawne and Raleigh M. Dawne. In 1877, his wife took charge of the state school for the blind, and he was admitted to the Oregon bar in 1880. He did not take a leading role in cases, instead using his position to draw up forged mortgage documents.

== Judicial appointment and controversy ==
On July 21, 1885, Dawne secured a recess appointment from President Grover Cleveland to be Judge of the United States Territorial Court for the District of Alaska, succeeding Ward McAllister Jr., whom Cleveland had removed. Banker Asahel Bush, who had business dealings with Dawne, sent a letter to the White House detailing his misgivings with Dawne's appointment, including financial improprieties, his false claims regarding medical experience, and his inexperience as a lawyer. Dawne took office on August 20, 1885. While Cleveland initially defended Dawne's appointment, within a month, he had sent a letter reprimanding La Fayette Grover, the former Oregon senator and governor, who had recommended Dawne. With his application for the judgeship, Dawne had sent a list of 123 signatures of leading citizens and lawyers recommending him for the post. He also received letters of recommendation from Grover, ex-Senator and State Supreme Court Justice James K. Kelly, ex-Congressman Rufus Mallory, legislator and businessman William D. Fenton, ex-Congressman Lafayette Lane, State Treasurer Edward Hirsch, State Secretary of State Rockey Earhart, State Supreme Court Justice John Kelsay, Blaine elector and future Alaska territory judge Warren Truitt, ex-Senator and U.S. Attorney General George Henry Williams, and Governor Zenas Ferry Moody. Cleveland removed Dawne from office on September 23, 1885 and replaced him with Lafayette Dawson of Missouri.

== Disappearance ==
Dawne continued in an interim capacity and was set to open court in Wrangell on November 2, 1885, but on October 26, he departed Wrangell on a 150-mile canoe trip to Fort Tongass. He had told several different stories of why he was departing and instructed the marshal to adjourn the court until his return. Dawne sent letters to his wife admitting to crimes and indicating that he had fled to British Columbia. She informed Governor Alfred P. Swineford of the letters on November 16, and Swineford informed Attorney General Augustus Hill Garland of Dawne's disappearance the next day. Swineford stated that "while no judge at all is better than such a one as Dawne, his disappearance nevertheless completely blocks the wheels of justice in the Territory." By December 24, there were seven summonses out for Dawne in Oregon relating to $30,000 in forgeries and embezzlement. He was tracked to a boarding house in Victoria, British Columbia, where he was last seen on December 19. Speculation following his disappearance focused on Dawne having perished or committed suicide.

Following his disappearance, his wife and two sons returned to Salem to live with her father, and she secured a divorce in 1887. She subsequently remarried and was widowed. Her father died in 1904, leaving his $80,000 fortune to her, and she died in early 1905. Later that year, Dawne, or somebody claiming to be Dawne, and claiming to hold office in another country, sent a letter outlining their intention to claim her fortune by having their divorce annulled. While it was believed possible that the statute of limitations had passed relating to the forgery charges from 1885, because charges had been filed in time, the charges were still pending, and Dawne did not appear. There was doubt as to the validity of the letter, viewed as part of an attempt to claim the fortune, which was inherited by Dawne's two sons.

== Electoral history ==
1874 general election: Oregon Superintendent of Public Instruction
Party	Candidate	Votes	%
Republican	Levi L. Rowland	9,730	38.8
Democratic	E. J. Dawne	9,690	38.6
Independent	M. M. Oglesby	5,657	22.6

== See also ==
- Dawne's defense of his actions
- List of people who disappeared mysteriously (pre-1910)
