= Lafayette Dawson =

American lawyer

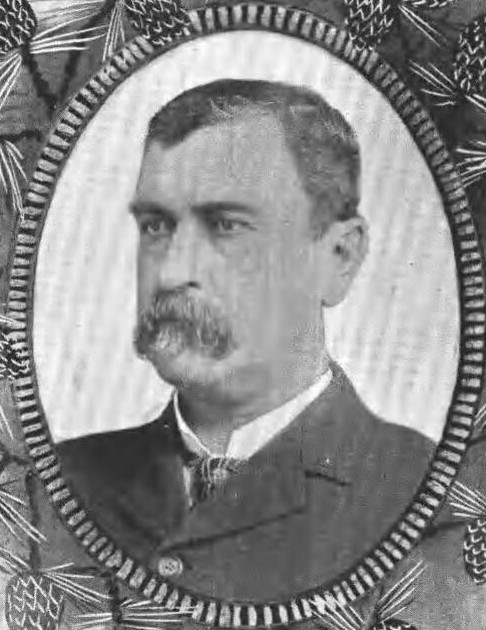

Judge of the United States Territorial Court for the District of Alaska
- In office December 16, 1885 – May 1888
- Appointed by: Grover Cleveland
- Preceded by: E. J. Dawne
- Succeeded by: John H. Keatley

Personal details
- Born: May 13, 1839 McLean County, Illinois
- Died: January 28, 1897 (aged 57) Maryville, Missouri
- Political party: Democratic
- Spouse: Celesta Thornhill (m. 1860)
- Children: 3
- Parents: James R. Dawson (father); Elizabeth (mother)

Lafayette "Lafe" Dawson (May 13, 1839 – March 28, 1897) was an American lawyer and judge.

== Early life ==
Dawson was born in McLean County, Illinois, the son of Elizabeth and James R. Dawson, a prosperous farmer and county judge. After attending schools there, he took an academic course in Lexington, Illinois. He travelled through the West, teaching, from Kansas to New Mexico to Colorado. He returned to Kansas, and married Celesta Thornhill in Fort Scott in 1860. They would have three children: John M. Dawson, Cora E. Dawson Fowler, and Eva N. Dawson.

In 1865, he moved to Lincoln Township, Nodaway County, Missouri. There, he farmed, taught, studied law, and was a justice of the peace. In 1866, he moved to nearby Maryville, Missouri, where he would spend most of the rest of his life.

== Legal career ==
He began practicing law in Maryville in 1866, and quickly became a prominent lawyer. In 1876, he was a Missouri presidential elector for the Samuel J. Tilden campaign.

President Grover Cleveland appointed Dawson to be the third judge of the Territorial District of Alaska on December 3, 1885. He took his oath of office on December 16. Scandal threatened to prevent Dawson's senate confirmation. Dawson and Governor Alfred P. Swineford recommended Adolph Lipman, a Maryville grocer indicted for violating liquor laws, as a commissioner of Alaska. Cleveland nominated Lipman, and when it was discovered that Dawson held a bill of sale for everything Lipman owned in Maryville, political furor erupted in July 1886 that made Dawson's confirmation appear unlikely. Lipman's nomination was withdrawn later that month, and Dawson was confirmed on August 4.

Dawson's most famous case was United States v. The British Schooners "Dolphin", "Anna Beck", "Grace", and "Ada," in which he decided that the United States had the right to seize vessels in the Bering Sea due to treaty rights inherited from Russia upon the purchase of Alaska. This went against the wishes of Cleveland and the administration. His decision was upheld by the Supreme Court, but was overturned at an international tribunal where six of the eight members were from Europe. He resigned in 1888, with news of his resignation reaching in the lower 48 states on May 12, 1888. He left Alaska in early September, upon the arrival of his successor, John H. Keatley.

Dawson returned from Alaska to Maryville, where he spent the rest of his life practicing law and as a community leader. He died there on March 28, 1897.
