= 1878 New Hampshire gubernatorial election =

There were two gubernatorial elections held in New Hampshire in 1878:

- March 1878 New Hampshire gubernatorial election
- November 1878 New Hampshire gubernatorial election
