= Ward McAllister Jr. =

American lawyer

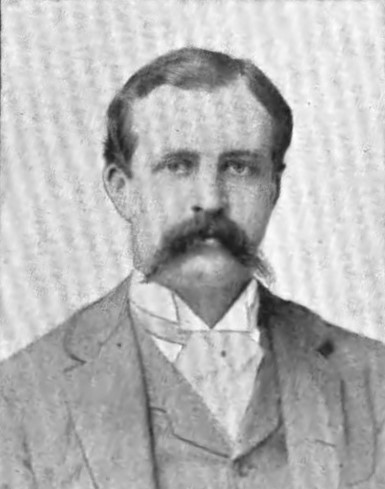

Judge of the United States Territorial Court for the District of Alaska
- In office August 25, 1884 – August 1885
- Appointed by: Chester A. Arthur
- Preceded by: position established
- Succeeded by: E. J. Dawne

Personal details
- Born: July 27, 1855 Newport, Rhode Island
- Died: March 31, 1908 (aged 52) San Rafael, California
- Party: Democratic
- Parents: Ward McAllister (father); Sarah Taintor Gibbons (mother)
- Education: Princeton University; Albany Law School; Harvard Law School

Ward McAllister Jr. (July 27, 1855 – March 31, 1908) was an American lawyer and judge.

== Early life ==
McAllister was born in Newport, Rhode Island, the son of Ward McAllister, a socialite famous for establishing The Four Hundred. His grandfather, Matthew Hall McAllister, was a Georgia politician who became the first and only judge to sit on the U.S. Circuit Court for the Districts of California.

McAllister graduated from Princeton University, then from Albany Law School in 1877. He was admitted to the New York bar that year, and graduated from Harvard Law School in 1880.

== Legal career ==
Ward McAllister Jr. joined his father at the firm McAllister & McAllister in San Francisco in 1881. In 1882, he became an assistant United States attorney for the Northern District of California. In December 1883, Judge Ogden Hoffman Jr. urged Senator John Miller to have McAllister nominated to be the first district judge for the Alaska Territory.

On July 15, 1884, Chester Arthur appointed McAllister to that position. He was sworn in on August 25, 1884. The situation McAllister encountered upon arrival in Sitka and Wrangell was chaotic. There was no prison nor money to feed prisoners.

McAllister's brief tenure in Alaska centered around feuds over alcohol and the treatment of Tlingit children. These feuds pitted McAllister, Governor John Henry Kinkead, and Edward W. Haskett, the U.S. attorney, against Dr. Sheldon Jackson, a missionary, and territory commissioner John Green Brady. McAllister and Haskett supported Kinkead's call for Congress to legalize alcohol so that it could be regulated in the legally dry territory, where alcohol was plentiful. McAllister agreed with Haskett's assessment that Jackson's Sitka Training School's treatment of Tlingit children was tantamount to indentured servitude. He rejected Brady's claim that it would be impossible to implant American values upon the children without removing them from their parents for five years. Following McAllister's actions, 47 of the school's 103 students returned to their homes.

Jackson and Brady commenced berating McAllister and Haskett. In letters to Rev. William N. Cleveland, the older brother of newly elected President Grover Cleveland, Jackson wrote that McAllister was "not long admitted to the bar," with little experience and "still less knowledge." Furthermore, he said that McAllister "gets drunk and is a fast young man in every sense of the word," while greatly exaggerating the length of a trip McAllister took. Brady was quoted in papers, saying that McAllister "was destitute on almost every attribute which would entitle him to the supreme control of the judicial...affairs of a great, half-civilized Territory...with his little velvet jacket, high collar, gloves and dandy cane...he was a rare curiosity in Sitka." Cleveland dismissed McAllister, Kinkead, and Haskett in 1885 on Jackson's advice, while retaining Brady. Kinkead protested to the president on McAllister's behalf, stating that the judge's character had "been falsely and malignantly misrepresented," and opined that Jackson and his followers were the only Alaskans dissatisfied with the judge. McAllister's father talked to the president and sought his son's reinstatement several times. McAllister sued over his removal but the United States Supreme Court found President Cleveland had the power to remove McAllister as judge.

McAllister worked for the Pacific Mail Steamship Company from 1886 through 1906, when he encountered significant health issues. He died on March 31, 1908, in San Rafael, California.
