= 1878 Nevada gubernatorial election =

- November 5, 1878
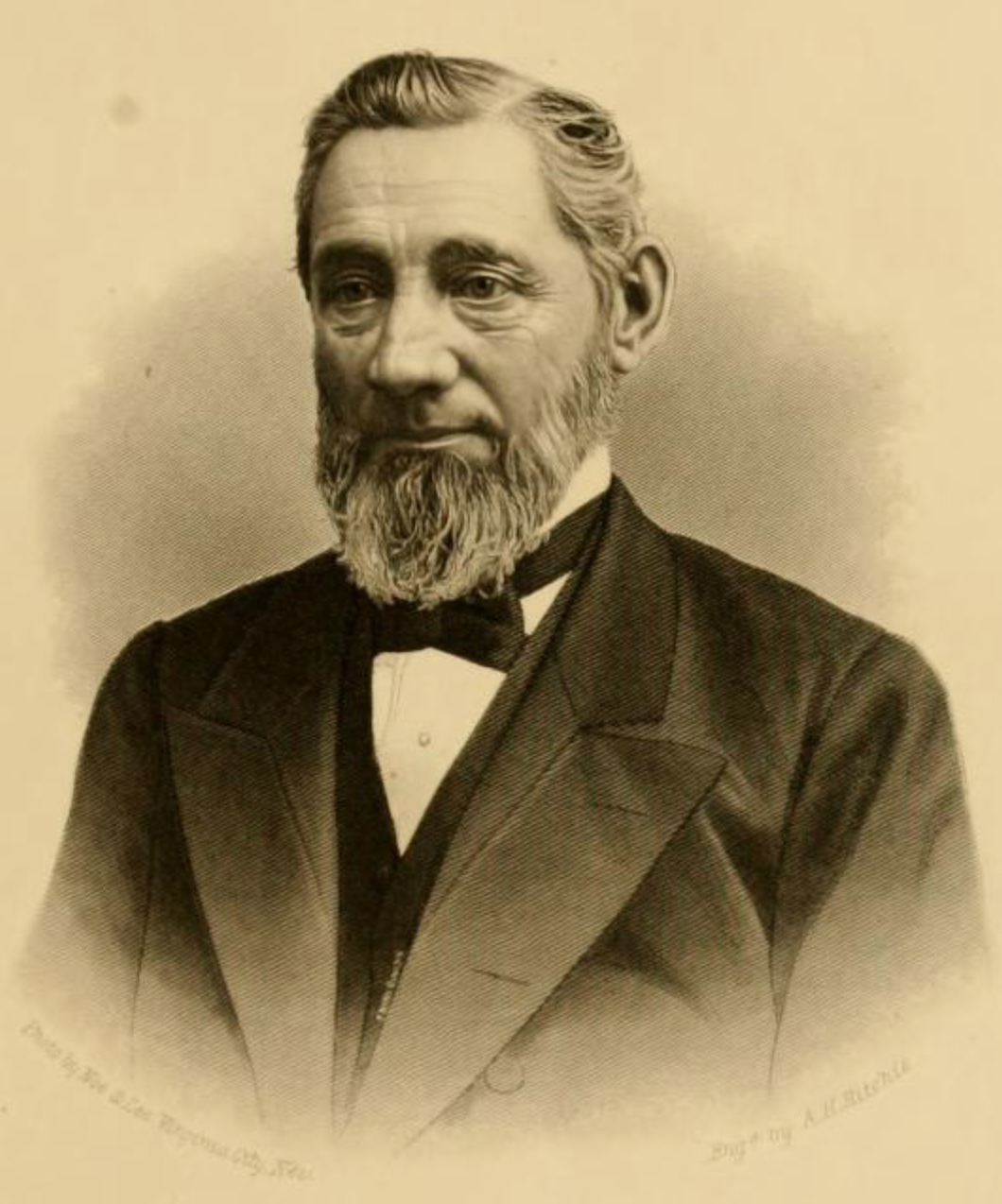

Nominee	John Henry Kinkead	Lewis R. Bradley
Party	Republican	Democratic
Popular vote	9,747	9,252
Percentage	51.30%	48.70%
- County results Kinkead: 50–60% 60–70% Bradley: 50–60% No Vote/Data
Governor before election
Lewis R. Bradley
Democratic
Elected Governor
John Henry Kinkead
Republican

The 1878 Nevada gubernatorial election was held on November 5, 1878, in order to elect the Governor of Nevada. The incumbent Democratic Governor of Nevada Lewis R. Bradley lost re-election to Republican nominee John Henry Kinkead.

== General election ==
On election day, November 5, 1878, Republican nominee John Henry Kinkead won the election by a margin of 495 votes against his opponent incumbent Democratic Governor of Nevada Lewis R. Bradley, thereby gaining Republican control over the office of Governor from the Democrats. Kinkead was sworn in as the 3rd Governor of Nevada on January 3, 1879.

=== Results ===
Nevada gubernatorial election, 1878
Party	Candidate	Votes	%	±%
Republican	John Henry Kinkead	9,747	51.30%	+8.28%
Democratic	Lewis R. Bradley (incumbent)	9,252	48.70%	−8.28%
Majority		495	2.60%	
Total votes		18,999	100.00%	
Republican gain from Democratic		Swing	+16.56%	

=== Results by county ===
County	John H. Kinkead Republican		Lewis R. Bradley Democratic		Margin		Total votes cast
County	#	%	#	%	#	%	Total votes cast
Churchill	58	45.31%	70	54.69%	-12	-9.38%	128
Douglas	257	52.56%	232	47.44%	25	5.11%	489
Elko	757	40.57%	1,109	59.43%	-352	-18.86%	1,866
Esmeralda	456	46.01%	535	53.99%	-79	-7.97%	991
Eureka	1,079	50.49%	1,058	49.51%	21	0.98%	2,137
Humboldt	508	52.75%	455	47.25%	53	5.50%	963
Lander	441	41.56%	620	58.44%	-179	-16.87%	1,061
Lincoln	355	45.28%	429	54.72%	-74	-9.44%	784
Lyon	389	65.27%	207	34.73%	182	30.54%	596
Nye	374	43.34%	489	56.66%	-115	-13.33%	863
Ormsby	638	61.46%	400	38.54%	238	22.93%	1,038
Storey	3,216	56.35%	2,491	43.65%	725	12.70%	5,707
Washoe	740	52.37%	673	47.63%	67	4.74%	1,413
White Pine	479	49.74%	484	50.26%	-5	-0.52%	963
Totals	9,747	51.30%	9,252	48.70%	495	2.61%	18,999

==== Counties that flipped from Democratic to Republican ====
- Douglas
- Eureka
- Humboldt
- Storey
- Washoe

==== Counties that flipped from Republican to Democratic ====
- Lander
