= James Sheakley =

American politician (1829–1917)

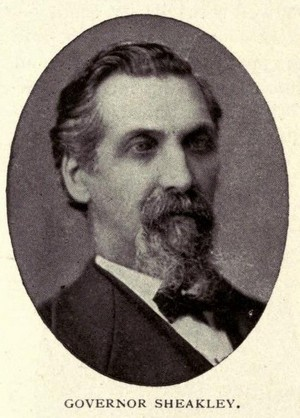

4th Governor of District of Alaska
- In office August 29, 1893 – July 15, 1897
- Nominated by: Grover Cleveland
- Preceded by: Lyman Enos Knapp
- Succeeded by: John Green Brady

Member of the U.S. House of Representatives from Pennsylvania's 26th district
- In office March 4, 1875 – March 4, 1877
- Preceded by: Charles Albright, Glenni W. Scofield, Lemuel Todd
- Succeeded by: John M. Thompson

Personal details
- Born: April 24, 1829 Sheakleyville, Pennsylvania, U.S.
- Died: December 10, 1917 (aged 88) Greenville, Pennsylvania, U.S.
- Party: Democratic
- Spouse: Lydia Long

James Sheakley (April 24, 1829 – December 10, 1917) was an American Democratic politician who was the Governor of the District of Alaska from 1893 to 1897. He was also a member of the United States House of Representatives from Pennsylvania from 1875 to 1877.

== Background ==
Sheakley was born on April 24, 1829, to Moses and Susanna (Limber) Sheakley in Sheakleyville, Pennsylvania. He was educated at the Sheakleyville common school and Meadville Academy. Sheakley was trained as a cabinet maker but worked instead as a teacher in rural schools.

The California Gold Rush prompted Sheakley to head west. Arriving in San Francisco on February 2, 1852, he worked as a miner for three years. Sheakley returned to Pennsylvania after his work in the gold fields and married Lydia Long of Greenville, Pennsylvania on December 25, 1855. The marriage would produce three children, two daughters who died as children and one son who survived to adulthood.

Following his wedding, Sheakley moved to Greenville and, in 1860, established a dry goods business. Then, with the start of the Pennsylvanian oil rush, he switched industries and became a pioneer of the oil industry.

== Congressional career ==
Sheakley continued his work in the oil industry until 1874. Running in a traditionally Republican area, the Democrat was elected to represent Pennsylvania's 26th congressional district. He advocated passage of legislation blocking the use of rebates of freight charges during the transportation of petroleum products on the railroads. He pushed through an appropriation that enlarged the Bureau of Education. During the resolution of the 1876 U.S. presidential election, he helped lead a filibuster blocking the bill granting the Presidency to Rutherford B. Hayes. He was unsuccessful during his 1876 run for reelection.

== Alaska ==
Upon the recommendation of US Secretary of the Interior Lucius Quintus Cincinnatus Lamar, Sheakley was appointed a United States Commissioner for District of Alaska, a position equivalent to a U.S. Circuit Court judge, on June 23, 1887. After starting this position in Wrangell, Alaska on August 9, 1887, the Commissioner of Education added to his duties by appointing his superintendent of schools for southeastern Alaska. In 1888, Sheakley was admitted to the Alaskan bar.

He was one of Alaska's two delegates to the 1892 Democratic National Convention. During the convention, the Alaska delegation cast the final two votes needed to secure the party's nomination for Grover Cleveland.

U.S. House of Representatives
| Preceded by At-large on a general ticket: Charles Albright, Glenni W. Scofield, Lemuel Todd | Member of the U.S. House of Representatives from Pennsylvania's 26th congressional district 1875–1877 | Succeeded by John M. Thompson |
Political offices
| Preceded by Lyman Enos Knapp | District Governor of Alaska; 1893–1897 | Succeeded by John Green Brady |
