= Governor Prescott =

Governor Prescott may refer to:

- Benjamin F. Prescott (1833–1895), 36th Governor of New Hampshire from 1877 to 1879
- Henry Prescott (1783–1874), Governor of the Newfoundland Colony from 1834 to 1841
- Robert Prescott (1726–1815), Governor-General of The Canadas from 1796 to 1799
