= Charles B. Andrews =

American judge

Charles Bartlett Andrews
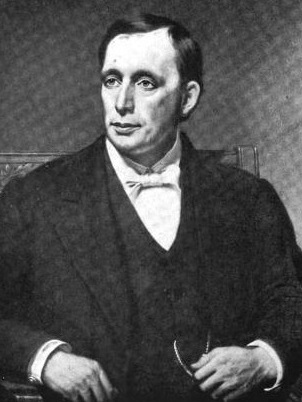

49th Governor of Connecticut
- In office January 9, 1879 – January 5, 1881
- Lieutenant: David Gallup
- Preceded by: Richard D. Hubbard
- Succeeded by: Hobart B. Bigelow

Personal details
- Born: November 4, 1834 Sunderland, Massachusetts, U.S.
- Died: September 12, 1902 (aged 67) Litchfield, Connecticut, U.S.
- Party: Republican
- Spouse(s): Mary J. Carter Andrews, Sarah M. Wilson Andrews
- Relatives: Stephen Pearl Andrews (Uncle)
- Education: Amherst College
- Profession: Lawyer, politician

Charles Bartlett Andrews (November 4, 1834 – September 12, 1902) was an American politician and the 49th governor of Connecticut.

== Biography ==
Andrews was born in Sunderland, Massachusetts on November 4, 1834, the son of Erastus Andrews (1805 - 1873) and Almira Bartlett (1806 - 1891). His Uncle is Anarchist Stephen Pearl Andrews, who is the younger brother of his father. He graduated from Amherst College in 1858. He then moved to the state of Connecticut and studied law. In 1861 he was admitted to the bar. He was married twice; to Mary J. Carter and to Sarah M. Wilson. He had one child.

== Career ==
In 1863 he moved to Litchfield, and became the partner of Richard D. Hubbard, then in large practice; here he at once took a prominent position at the bar, advancing rapidly till he became its leader.

In 1868 Andrews became a member of the Connecticut State Senate from Litchfield County. In 1878, however, he accepted the nomination for representative from Litchfield in the Connecticut House of Representatives. At the following election he was elected and enjoyed the distinction of being the first Republican to hold that office since the American Civil War. In this session he was chairman of the Judiciary Committee and leader of the House.

Later in the same year, 1878, Andrews was elected the Governor of Connecticut by a legislative vote, and served from January 9, 1879, to January 5, 1881. During his term, the governor's office was granted the power to recommend judges for the State Supreme Court and a resolution passed that ended an ongoing boundary line dispute. A bill was constituted that established the incorporation of joint-stock companies and a progressive jury law was formed.

Andrews left the office on January 5, 1881, and continued his law practice. Appointed to the bench of the Connecticut Superior Court in 1881, he served as chief justice from 1889 to 1901. He was also a delegate and presiding officer to the 1902 Constitutional Convention.

== Death ==
Andrews died on September 12, 1902 (age 67 years, 312 days). He is interred at East Cemetery, Litchfield, Connecticut.

Party political offices
Preceded by H. Robinson	Republican nominee for Governor of Connecticut; 1878	Succeeded by Hobart B. Bigelow
Political offices
Preceded by Richard D. Hubbard	Governor of Connecticut; 1879–1881	Succeeded by Hobart B. Bigelow
