= John H. Keatley =

American lawyer

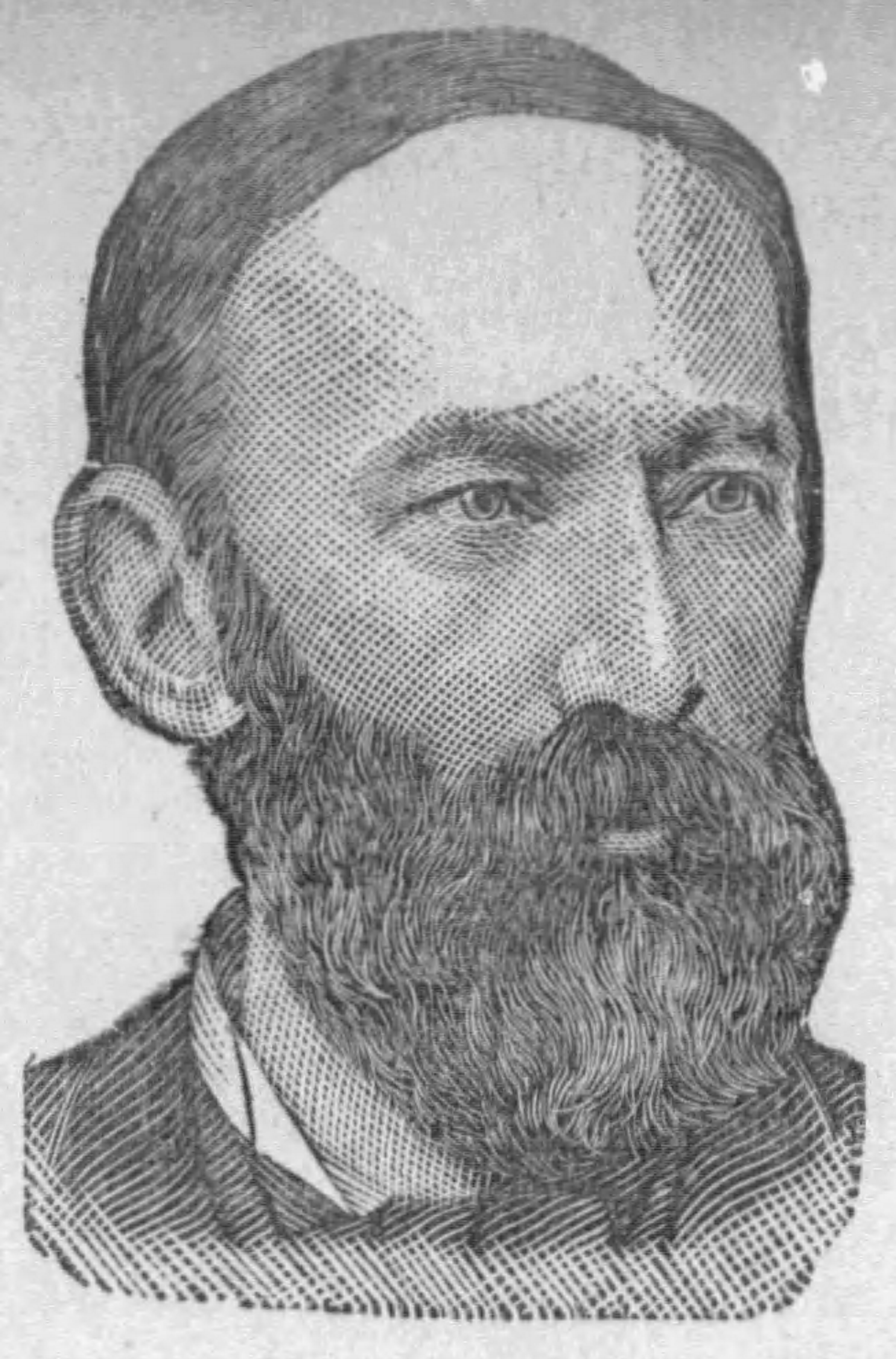

Judge of the United States Territorial Court for the District of Alaska
- In office August 15, 1888 – October 1, 1889
- Appointed by: Grover Cleveland
- Preceded by: Lafayette Dawson
- Succeeded by: John S. Bugbee

Member of the Iowa House of Representatives from the 22nd district
- In office January 11, 1886 – January 8, 1888 Serving with Robert S. Hart

Personal details
- Born: December 1, 1838 Boalsburg, Pennsylvania
- Died: June 19, 1905 (aged 66) Washington, D.C.
- Party: Republican (to 1874); Democratic (from 1874)
- Spouse: Margaret J.
- Children: Thomas Francis Keatley; Emily Frances Keatley; Louisa Keatley
- Parents: James Gregg Keatley (father); Emily Hubler (mother)

John Henry Keatley (December 1, 1838 – June 19, 1905) was an American newspaper editor, politician, and judge.

== Early life ==
Keatley was born in Boalsburg, Pennsylvania, to John Gregg and Emily Hubler Keatley. After attending schools in Bellefonte, Pennsylvania, he read law there with Andrew Gregg Curtin, a relative of Keatley's father who was elected governor in 1860. Keatley was admitted to the bar that year. Soon after, he became the editor of The Blair County Whig, a pro-Lincoln newspaper.

He joined the 125th Pennsylvania Infantry Regiment as an administrator, and was an assistant adjutant general on the staff of Jacob C. Higgins during the Gettysburg campaign. After working for General Grant in the waning days of the Civil War, Keatley worked with the Freedmen's Bureau in southeastern Virginia and was a judge in a military court in Norfolk.

Keatley was elected as the district attorney for Blair County, Pennsylvania, twice following the war. He moved to Cedar Falls, Iowa, in 1867, then to Council Bluffs the next year. There, he served as the editor of The Nonpareil from 1868 until 1870.

== Political career ==
From there, Keatley launched a largely unsuccessful political career. He chaired the Iowa Liberal Republican committee in 1872. In 1874, he lost the Iowa Attorney General race to Democrat Marsena E. Cutts, running as an Anti-Monopoly Republican. Following his loss, he became a Democrat. He served a one-year term as mayor of Council Bluffs from 1876 to 1877. In 1877, he lost a race for the state legislature by four votes. In 1878, he lost a race for Iowa's 8th congressional district as a Democrat to Republican William Fletcher Sapp, placing third behind a Greenback candidate. In 1884, Keatley served as a Prohibition Party candidate for presidential elector; the Prohibition candidate John St. John received 0.4% of the vote in Iowa.

In 1885, he was elected to the Iowa House of Representatives. During his time as a representative, he was involved in amending the first bill to regulate medicine, surgery, and obstetrics in the state, first by offering amendments to make the bill legally sound, then by leading the opposition, and finally by supporting it after concessions had been made. He was a manager of the Senate trial of Iowa State Auditor John L. Brown, who was acquitted after being impeached by the House of Representatives.

In 1886, he lost a race for Iowa's 9th congressional district as a Democrat to Republican Joseph Lyman.

== Later career ==
In 1887, he was the editor of a short-lived newspaper called the Sioux City Herald, after which he returned to editing the Council Bluffs Globe, which he had previously edited for several years. In August 1887, U.S. Treasury Secretary Charles S. Fairchild appointed Keatley to be "chief of the miscellaneous division of the second controller's office."

On July 9, 1888, President Grover Cleveland nominated Keatley to be Judge of the United States Territorial Court for the District of Alaska. He received his commission on July 19, and was sworn in on August 15. Upon his early September arrival in Alaska, Keatley was not in good health, as had been reported several times since his military service. He resigned effective October 1, 1889. He left Alaska on December 15, upon the arrival of his successor, John S. Bugbee.

Upon returning to Iowa, Keatley moved to Sioux City. There, he became a partner in the law firm Davis, Gantt, & Keatley. From 1892 to 1894, he was commandant of the soldiers' home in Marshalltown.

Keatley moved to Minnesota, and was editor of the Saint Paul Dispatch in the mid-1890s. He then entered the civil service in the treasury department for several years.

He died in Washington, D.C., on June 18, 1905.

== Electoral history ==
1874 general election: Iowa Attorney General
| Party | Candidate | Votes | % |
|---|---|---|---|
| Democratic | Marsena E. Cutts | 106,632 | 57.2 |
| Republican | John H. Keatley | 79,754 | 42.7 |
| | scattering | 183 | 0.1 |

1878 general election: Iowa's 8th congressional district
| Party | Candidate | Votes | % |
|---|---|---|---|
| Republican | William Fletcher Sapp | 15,343 | 50.2 |
| Greenback | George C. Hieks | 7,760 | 25.4 |
| Democratic | John H. Keatley | 7,453 | 24.4 |

1886 general election: Iowa's 9th congressional district
| Party | Candidate | Votes | % |
|---|---|---|---|
| Republican | Joseph Lyman | 16,953 | 53.5 |
| Democratic | John H. Keatley | 14,747 | 46.5 |
