= 1878 Connecticut lieutenant gubernatorial election =

- November 5, 1878

Nominee	David Gallup	Charles Durand	Henry Manchester
Party	Republican	Democratic	Greenback
Popular vote	49,589	45,428	8,431
Percentage	47.44%	43.46%	8.07%
Lieutenant Governor before election
Francis Loomis
Democratic
Elected Lieutenant Governor
David Gallup
Republican

The 1878 Connecticut lieutenant gubernatorial election was held on November 5, 1878, to elect the lieutenant governor of Connecticut. Republican nominee and former Presidents pro tempore of the Connecticut Senate David Gallup received a plurality of the votes against Democratic nominee Charles Durand, Greenback nominee Henry Manchester and Prohibition nominee George P. Rogers. However, since no candidate received a majority in the popular vote, David Gallup was elected by the Connecticut General Assembly per the Connecticut Charter of 1662.

== General election ==
On election day, November 5, 1878, Republican nominee David Gallup won a plurality of the vote by a margin of 4,161 votes against his foremost opponent Democratic nominee Charles Durand. However, as no candidate received a majority of the vote, the election was forwarded to the Connecticut General Assembly, who elected David Gallup, thereby gaining Republican control over the office of lieutenant governor. Gallup was sworn in as the 59th lieutenant governor of Connecticut on January 9, 1879.

=== Results ===
Connecticut lieutenant gubernatorial election, 1878
Party	Candidate	Votes	%
Republican	David Gallup	49,589	47.44
Democratic	Charles Durand	45,428	43.46
Greenback	Henry Manchester	8,431	8.07
Prohibition	George P. Rogers	1,054	1.01
	Scattering	21	0.02
Total votes		104,523	100.00
Republican gain from Democratic			
