= District of Alaska =

Unorganized Territory of the United States from 1884 to 1912

Coordinates: 64°N 153°W

- Incorporated and unorganized territory of the United States
- 1884–1912
- Flag Seal

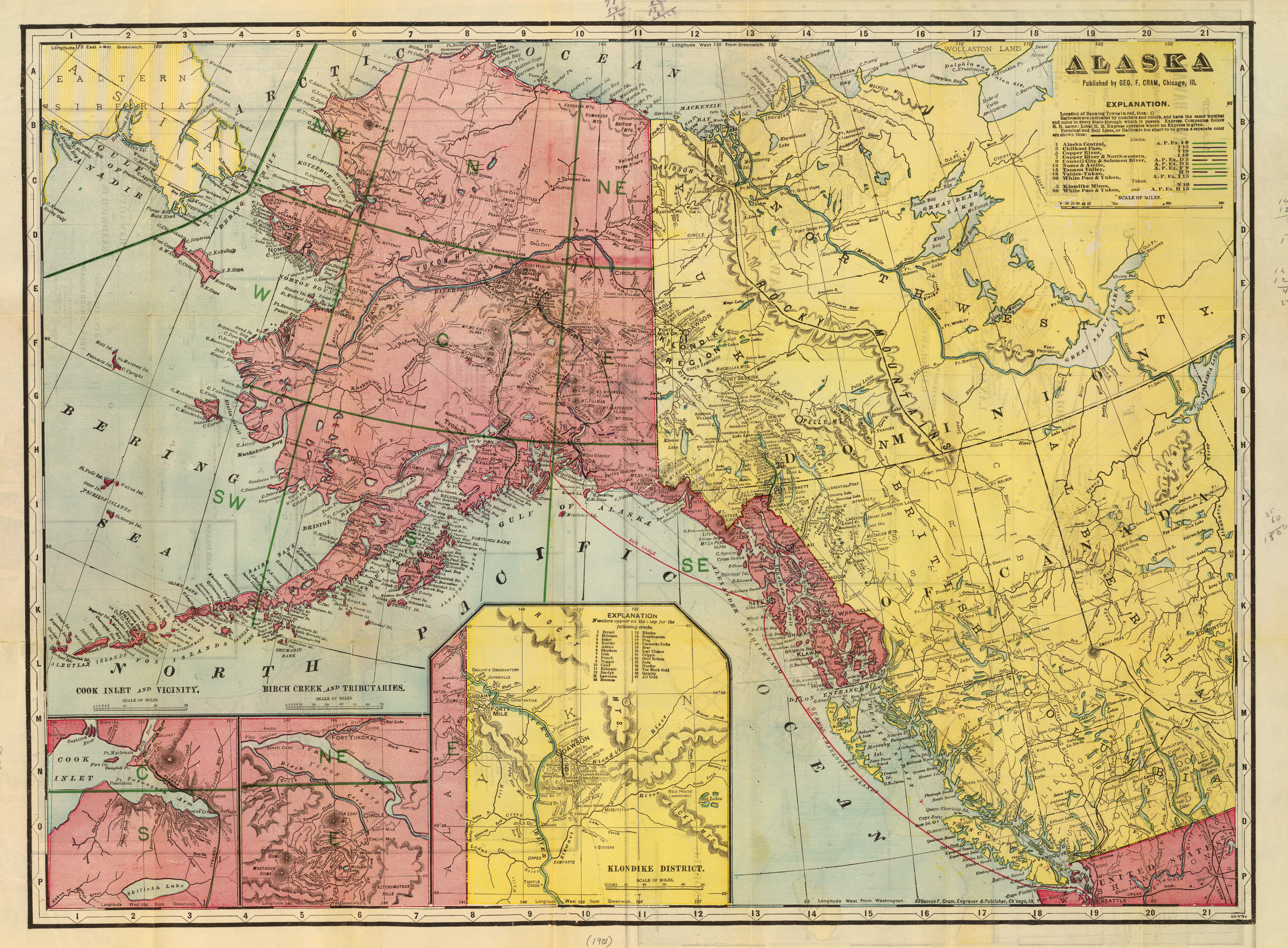
- Map of the District of Alaska
- Capital: Sitka (1884–1906); Juneau (1906–1912)
- History
  - District of Alaska: May 17, 1884
  - Territory of Alaska: August 24, 1912
Preceded by	Succeeded by
Department of Alaska	Territory of Alaska

The District of Alaska was the federal government of the United States' designation for Alaska from May 17, 1884, to August 24, 1912, when it became the Territory of Alaska. Previously (1867–1884) it had been known as the Department of Alaska, a military designation.

The designation as a district meant that Alaska became an incorporated but unorganized territory with a civil government. The governor of the District of Alaska was appointed by the president of the United States.

== Prelude to District status ==
At the time of the 1867 Alaska Purchase, legislators in Washington, D.C., were occupied with post–Civil War reconstruction issues, and had little time to dedicate to Alaska. As a department, Alaska was handled as a strategic military area, variously under the jurisdiction of the United States Army until 1877, the United States Department of the Treasury from 1877 until 1879, and the United States Navy from 1879 until 1884.

By 1884, the civilian population had grown to the point where President Chester A. Arthur signed off on the First Organic Act, and appointed a civil government.

== History while a District ==
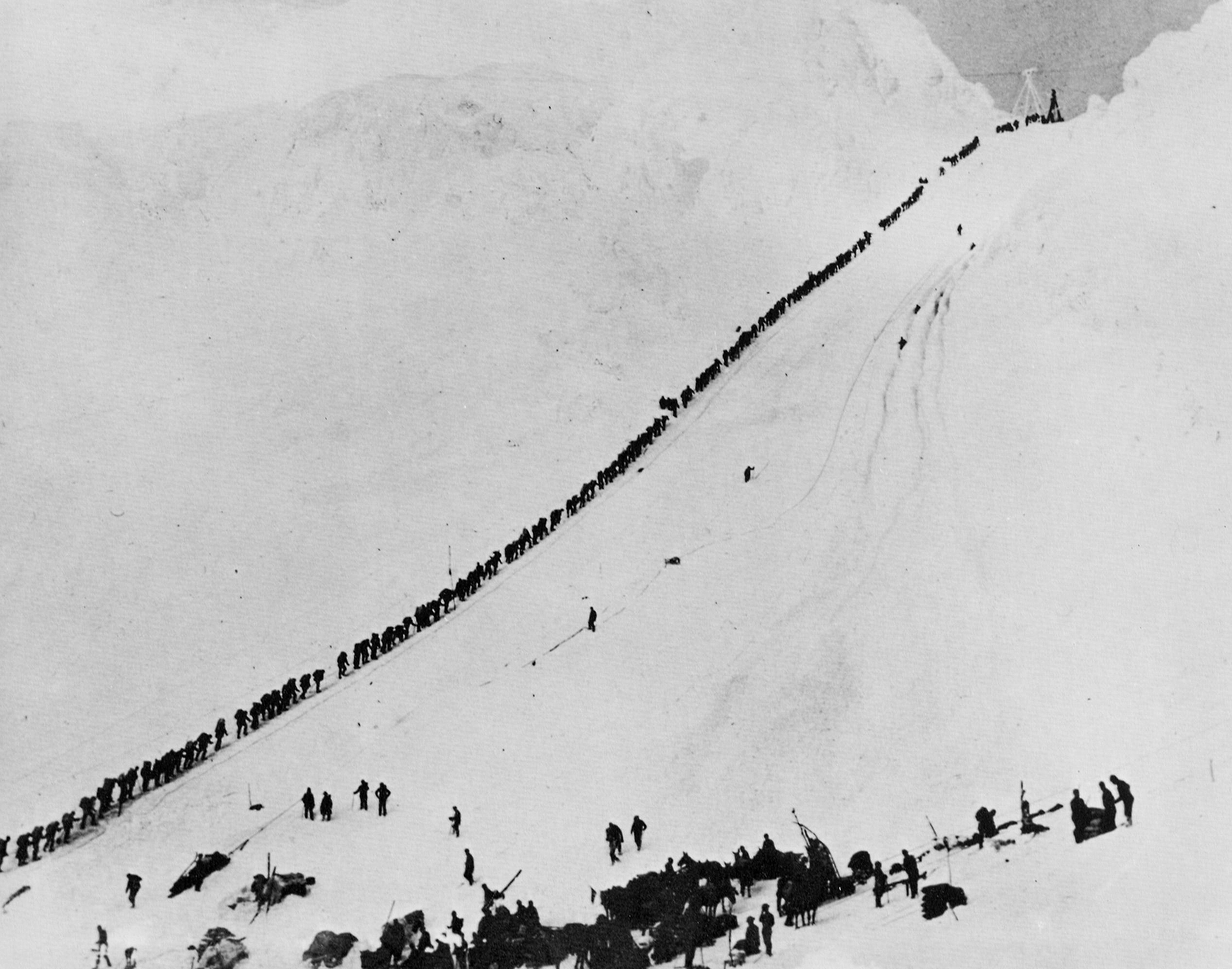
Miners and prospectors climb the Chilkoot Trail during the Klondike Gold Rush.

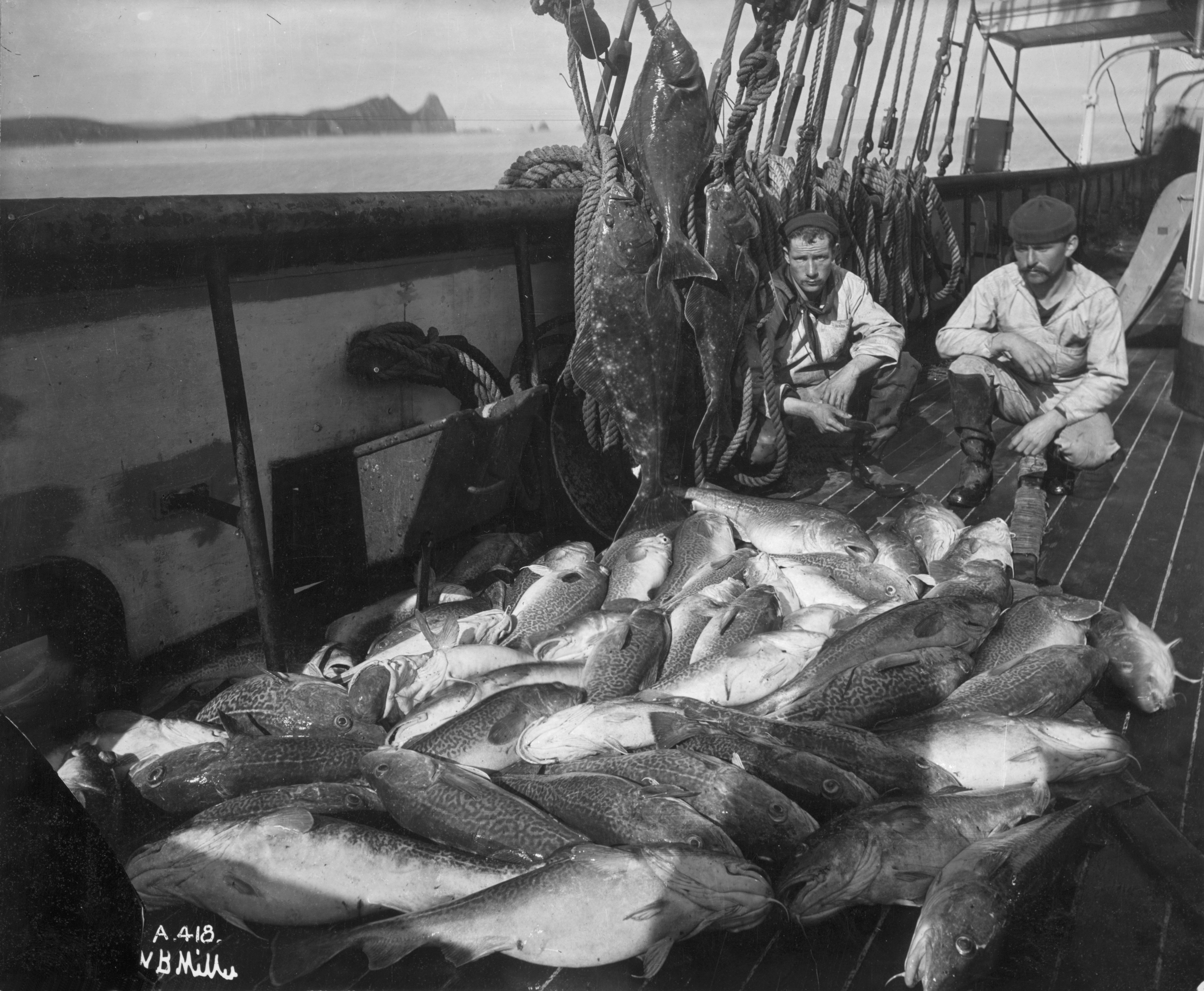
Alaskan fishing boat with a catch of cod and halibut, c. 1900

Historical population
Year	Pop.	±%
1890	32,052	—
1900	63,592	+98.4%
1910	64,356	+1.2%
Source: 1890–1910;

It was the discovery of gold in the Yukon in 1896 that brought attention to the United States' northern possession. A wave of fortune hunters clamored for passage to the Klondike, but the Klondike was in Yukon Territory, Canada, not Alaska as many a would-be miner believed. Still, the easiest route was by ship to Skagway, or Dyea, in Southeast Alaska. Miners had their choice of two passes across the mountains to the Yukon fields: The Chilkoot Trail, an old Native route, started in Dyea, and the White Pass, also called Dead Horse Trail, was in Skagway. The Chilkoot Trail was a shorter trip but had a considerably steeper climb. The White Pass took a little longer but was at a lower elevation. Skagway and the White Pass trail also had a severe crime problem, organized and led by the infamous badman, Soapy Smith. Smith was killed in Skagway at the Shootout on Juneau Wharf.

Alaska still had plenty of gold of its own, and many who had failed to make their fortunes in the Klondike strike came back to look for it. An earlier strike had established Juneau in Southeast Alaska, and gold was found in Nome in 1899. For several years a prospector named Felix Pedro had been searching in the Tanana Hills of the Interior for a gold-rich creek he had stumbled upon years earlier but had been forced to abandon. As the summer of 1901 drew to a close, Pedro was about to embark with his partner on a 165-mile walk to Circle City for supplies. He met up with E.T. Barnette, who had been forced to disembark from the steamer Lavelle Young with his entire load of supplies, some of which he sold to Pedro.

Replenished with supplies, Pedro continued his search in the area, and he finally struck gold in July 1902. Shortly afterward, Barnette's outpost was transformed into a booming town. Named Fairbanks in honor of U.S. Senator Charles W. Fairbanks, the settlement grew as more miners and new businesses arrived. The town had shanties on the fringes, but the center offered many of the economic conveniences of the rest of the U.S. Traffic came through the river, and an overland route to Valdez cut days off a trip to the contiguous United States. Eventually, the Tanana Mining District became a huge gold producer, and the metal attracted Americans and Europeans alike. In 1903 the predecessor to the Alaska Railroad began to be built, which would connect from Seward to Fairbanks by 1923, though Alaska still has no railroad connecting it to the lower 48 states.

Many people in Alaska found ways to profit from the gold rushes without actually panning for the metal themselves. At Ruby Creek, a strike in 1907, and a more substantial one in 1910 brought the rush of miners to the area and created the town of Ruby. The steamers the newcomers used required large quantities of wood to keep them moving, and residents along the river supplemented their trapping and fishing by maintaining profitable wood lots. Ruby grew from a tent city in 1911 to a river port and then had running water in summer, a theater, shops, and cafés. By 1917, at the height of the rush, creeks south of Ruby had yielded $875,000 worth of gold.

Other precious and semiprecious metals were being mined in Alaska, too, particularly copper. In 1910, the richest copper mine in the world started operation at Kennicott in the Wrangell-St. Elias Mountains. The mine extracted more than 591,535 tons of copper ore from the earth, and at its peak employed more than 800 workers.

The more traditional ways of life, fishing, in particular, also provided a livelihood for many Alaskans, particularly after canning was introduced. In 1878 businessmen built the first two canneries at Klawock and Sitka. In 1883 the Arctic Pack Company established a cannery at Nushagak Bay in Southwest Alaska, where they were able to exploit the immense runs of salmon. In 1880, two years later, the Alaska Packing Company opened a cannery across the bay, and by 1908, ten canneries ringed Nushagak Bay in Southwest Alaska. Kodiak's first canneries were built in the late 19th century when word of phenomenal fish runs became widespread.

By the turn of the 20th century, commercial fishing was gaining a foothold in the Aleutian Islands. Packing houses salted cod and herring, and salmon canneries were opened. Another traditional occupation, whaling, continued with no regard for over-hunting. They pushed the bowhead whales to the edge of extinction for the oil in their tissue (though in recent years, due to a decline in commercial whaling, their populations have rebounded enough for Natives to harvest many each year without affecting the population). The Aleuts soon suffered severe problems due to the depletion of the fur seals and sea otters which they needed for survival. As well as requiring the flesh for food, they also used the skins to cover their boats, without which they could not hunt. The Americans also expanded into the Interior and Arctic Alaska, exploiting the furbearers, fish, and other game on which Natives depended.

== Governors of the District of Alaska ==
The following were the Governors of the District of Alaska, appointed by the President of the United States:

Years	Governor
1884–1885	John Henry Kinkead
1885–1889	Alfred P. Swineford
1889–1893	Lyman Enos Knapp
1893–1897	James Sheakley
1897–1906	John Green Brady
1906–1909	Wilford Bacon Hoggatt
1909–1912	Walter Eli Clark
