= Lyman Enos Knapp =

American politician

3rd Governor of District of Alaska
- In office April 20, 1889 – August 29, 1893
- Nominated by: Benjamin Harrison
- Preceded by: Alfred P. Swineford
- Succeeded by: James Sheakley

Member of the Vermont House of Representatives
- In office 1884–1885

Personal details
- Born: November 5, 1837 Somerset, Vermont, U.S.
- Died: October 9, 1904 (aged 66) Seattle, Washington, U.S.
- Party: Republican
- Spouse: Martha A. Severance
- Education: Middlebury College (BA)

Lyman Enos Knapp (November 5, 1837 – October 9, 1904) was an American lawyer, journalist, and politician who served as the Governor of the District of Alaska from 1889 to 1893. He was also a member of the Vermont House of Representatives from 1884 to 1885.

== Early life and education ==
Knapp was born November 5, 1837, in Somerset, Vermont, to Hiram and Elvira (Stearns) Knapp. He was educated in Manchester, Vermont, first attending Burr and Burton Academy and then graduating with a Bachelor of Arts from Middlebury College in 1862.

== Career ==
=== Military service ===
After graduating from college, Knapp enlisted as a private in the Company I, 16th Vermont Infantry Regiment and was quickly promoted to captain of Company F, 17th Vermont Infantry Regiment. During his military service, he was wounded at Gettysburg, Spotsylvania, and Petersburg. Knapp rose to the rank of lieutenant colonel and was brevetted a colonel for his gallantry during the siege of Petersburg.

=== Vermont ===
Following the war, Knapp returned to Vermont, where he published the Middlebury Register from 1865 till 1878. In addition to the work on his own newspaper, he submitted articles to the Chicago Inter Ocean and the American Law Register. Beyond his journalistic efforts, Knapp served as Clerk of the Vermont Legislature during the 1872–1873 session. After being admitted to the bar in 1876, he served as a probate judge for the Addison district from 1879 to 1889. Knapp was also elected for a term in the Vermont House of Representatives from 1884 to 1885.

=== Governor of Alaska ===
Knapp was appointed Governor of the District of Alaska by President Benjamin Harrison, his term beginning on April 20, 1889. At the time of his appointment, many Alaskans desired a resident governor and were disappointed by receiving an "outsider". The district did, however, see a number of improvements during his administration. Postal service was extended with the creation of over 1,600 miles (2,600 km) of new mail routes. Knapp also helped establish a historical society and library.

On the legal front, Knapp asked for Alaska to be granted a delegate to the U.S. Congress. He also supported the creation of a commission to revise the district's legal code and, arguing that the lack of clear land possession discouraged improvements, lobbied for a revision of the land possession laws. To help maintain law and order, Knapp helped organize both a militia and Indian police. The former turned into a source of amusement for some area residents due to the governor's predilection for dressing in his military uniform and watching the militia parade before him.

During his term, an international dispute over seal fisheries reached a zenith. The United States, claiming that seals from Alaska were being killed by Canadian and other ships on the high seas, had seized several ships and brought them to Sitka. Arbitration to resolve the dispute was agreed to in 1891 between Canada, the United Kingdom, and the United States. As a result, a set of restrictions was imposed on seal hunting near Alaska. Knapp was replaced as governor on August 29, 1893, following the appointment of James Sheakley by President Grover Cleveland.

=== Later career ===
Following his term as governor, Knapp moved to Seattle and established a law practice. He was active in civil organizations such as the Institute of Civics and National Geographic Society and received an honorary LL.D. from Whitman College in 1893. Knapp was also the founder and president of the Anti-Saloon League of Washington. He remained active in the practice of law until his death on October 9, 1904.

== Personal life ==
On January 23, 1865, Knapp married Martha A. Severance of Middlebury, Vermont. The couple had four children.

Political offices
Preceded by Alfred P. Swineford	District Governor of Alaska; 1889–1893	Succeeded by James Sheakley
