= Julius L. Strong =

American politician

Julius Strong

Member of the U.S. House of Representatives from Connecticut's 1st district
- In office March 4, 1869 – September 7, 1872
- Preceded by: Richard D. Hubbard
- Succeeded by: Joseph R, Hawley

Personal details
- Born: November 8, 1828 Bolton, Connecticut, U.S.
- Died: September 7, 1872 (aged 43) Hartford, Connecticut, U.S
- Party: Republican
- Education: State and National Law School

Julius Levi Strong (November 8, 1828 – September 7, 1872) was an American politician from Connecticut who served as a Republican member of the United States House of Representatives from 1869 to 1872.

== Early life and education ==
Strong was born in Bolton, Connecticut. He attended Wesleyan University in Middletown, Connecticut for one year before transferring to Union College in Schenectady, New York. He left Union college in 1852 to study law at State and National Law School in Ballston Spa, New York.

== Career ==
He served as member of the Connecticut House of Representatives in 1852 and the Connecticut Senate in 1853. He read law under Martin Welles and was admitted to the bar in 1853 and commenced practice in Hartford, Connecticut. He served as a member of the State house of representatives for a second time in 1855. He served as prosecuting attorney in 1864 and 1865. He served as president of the common council.

Strong was elected as a Republican to the Forty-first and Forty-second Congresses and served from March 4, 1869, until his death in Hartford, Connecticut on September 7, 1872.

He was interred in Cedar Hill Cemetery.

== See also ==
- List of members of the United States Congress who died in office (1790–1899)

== Footnotes ==
U.S. House of Representatives
| Preceded by Richard D. Hubbard | Member of the U.S. House of Representatives from Connecticut's 1st congressional district March 4, 1869 – September 7, 1872 | Succeeded by Joseph R. Hawley |
