= Somerset, Vermont =

- Town
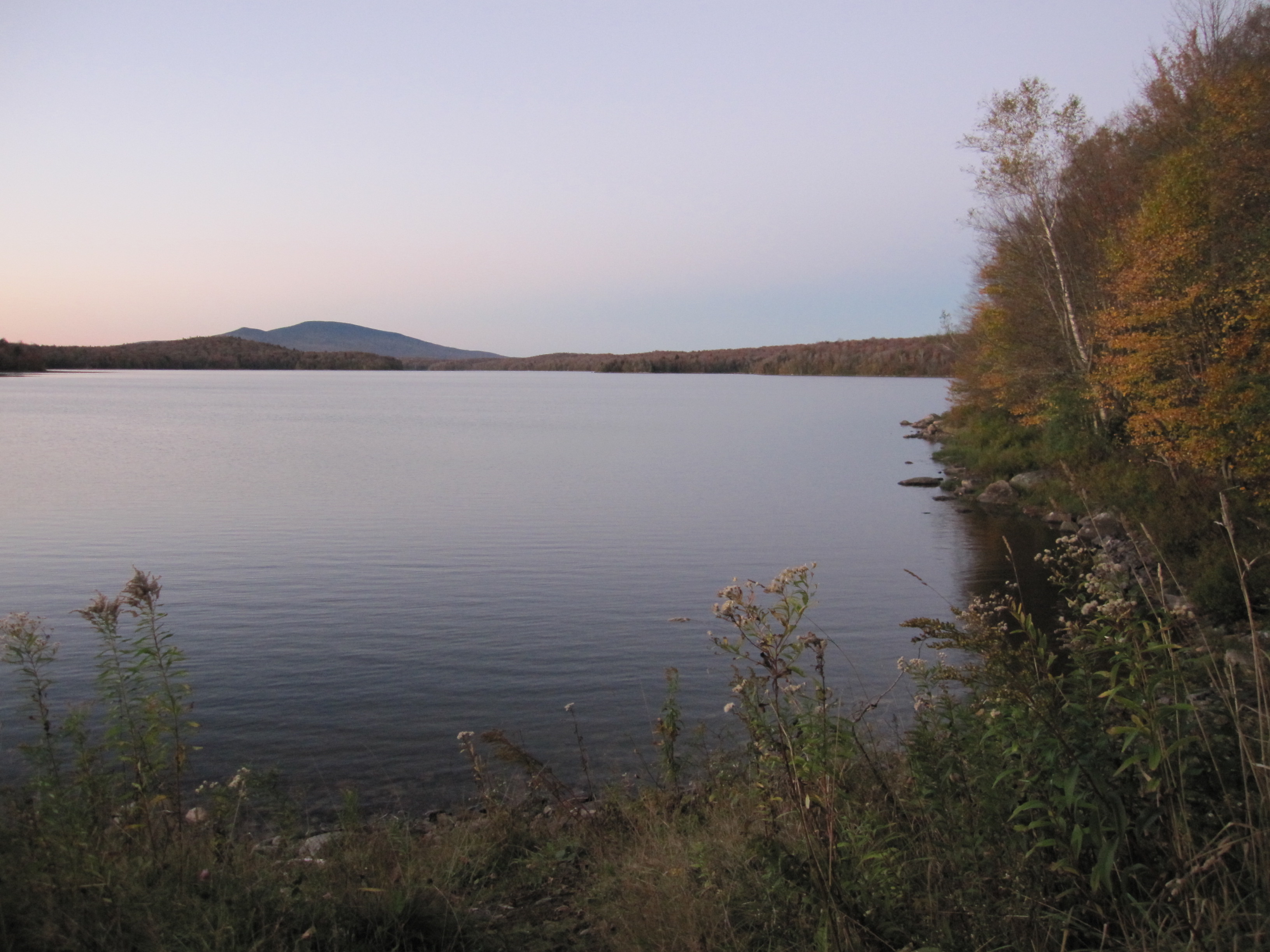
- Somerset Reservoir, Somerset, Vermont

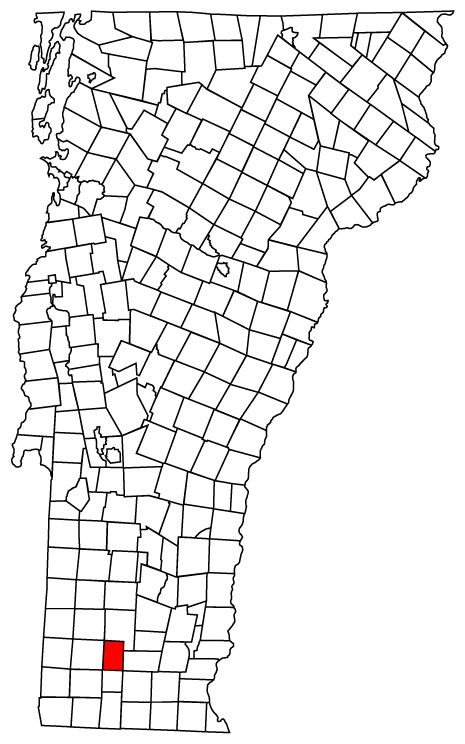
- Located in Windham County, Vermont
- Coordinates: 42°58′40″N 72°58′30″W
- Country: United States
- State: Vermont
- County: Windham
- Chartered: 1761 (Vermont)
- Elevation: 2,225 ft (678 m)

Population (2020)
  - Total: 6
  - Density: 0.2/sq mi (0.077/km^{2})
- Time zone: UTC-5 (EST)
  - Summer (DST): UTC-4 (EDT)
- ZIP Code: 05360 (Stratton)
- Area code: 802
- GNIS feature ID: 1462211

Somerset is an unincorporated town in Windham County, Vermont, United States. As of the 2020 census, it had a total population of 6. Somerset is one of five unincorporated towns in Vermont, having been disincorporated in 1937. The town has no local government and the town's affairs are handled by a state-appointed supervisor.

== Geography ==
According to the United States Census Bureau, the town had a total area of 28.1 square miles (72.9 km^{2}), of which 26.1 square miles (67.7 km^{2}) is land and 2.0 square miles (5.2 km^{2}) is water. The total area is 7.07% water. It is located high in the southern Green Mountains, with its little habitable terrain sandwiched between the main spine of those mountains and Mount Snow.

== Demographics ==
Historical population
Census	Pop.	Note	%±
1790	111		—
1800	130		17.1%
1810	199		53.1%
1820	173		−13.1%
1830	245		41.6%
1840	262		6.9%
1850	321		22.5%
1860	105		−67.3%
1870	80		−23.8%
1880	67		−16.2%
1890	61		−9.0%
1900	67		9.8%
1910	27		−59.7%
1920	59		118.5%
1930	20		−66.1%
1940	5		−75.0%
1950	8		60.0%
1960	4		−50.0%
1980	2		—
1990	2		0.0%
2000	5		150.0%
2010	3		−40.0%
2020	6		100.0%
U.S. Decennial Census

At the 2000 census there were 5 people, 2 households, and 1 family residing in the town. The population density was 0.2 people per square mile (0.1/km^{2}). There were 28 housing units at an average density of 1.1 per square mile (0.4/km^{2}). The racial makeup of the town was 100.00% White. Of the 2 households 50.0% had children under the age of 18 living with them, 50.0% were married couples living together, and 50.0% were non-families. 50.0% of households were one person who were 65 or older. The average household size was 2.50 and the average family size was 4.00.

The age distribution was 40.0% under the age of 18, 40.0% from 25 to 44, and 20.0% who are 45 to 64 years old. The median age was 34 years. For every 100 females, there were 400.0 males. For every 100 females age 18 and over, there were 200.0 males.

== Christmas tree ==
In 2007, the Capitol Christmas Tree was cut from the Green Mountain National Forest in Somerset.

== Snow ==
On March 5, 1947, Somerset had 78 inches (200 cm) of snow on the ground, the greatest daily snow depth for any location anywhere in Vermont.

== Notable people ==
- Elbridge Boyden, noted Worcester architect
- Lyman Enos Knapp, governor of the District of Alaska (1889 to 1893)
