= Nathaniel Head =

American politician (1828–1883)

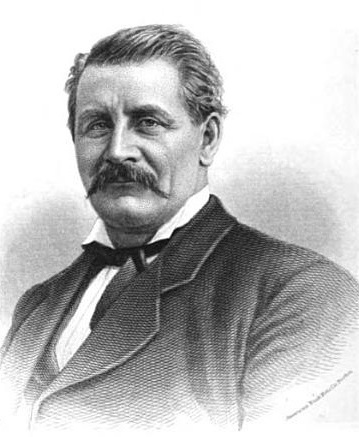

37th Governor of New Hampshire
- In office June 5, 1879 – June 2, 1881
- Preceded by: Benjamin F. Prescott
- Succeeded by: Charles H. Bell

Member of the New Hampshire House of Representatives
- In office 1861–1862

Personal details
- Born: May 20, 1828 Hooksett, New Hampshire
- Died: November 12, 1883 (aged 55) Hooksett, New Hampshire
- Party: Republican
- Spouse: Abbie M. Sanford
- Profession: Farmer; Sawmill operator Militia officer

Nathaniel Head (May 20, 1828 – November 12, 1883), also known as Natt Head, was an American construction material supplier and Republican politician from Hooksett, New Hampshire. He served as a member of the New Hampshire House of Representatives and New Hampshire Senate, served as Adjutant General of New Hampshire, and was the 37th governor of New Hampshire.

== Biography ==
Nathaniel Head was born in Hooksett, New Hampshire, on May 20, 1828. He was educated at Pembroke Academy, and became active in his family's farming, brick making and lumber businesses. He later established a successful railroad construction company, and became active in banking and insurance.

A Republican, Head served in the New Hampshire House of Representatives in 1861 and 1862. Having been active in the militia as a musician and chief of the governor's staff during the Civil War, he was appointed Adjutant General of the New Hampshire Militia in 1864 and served until 1870.

In 1874, Head ran for the New Hampshire State Senate from the 2nd District, and narrowly placed second to Democrat James Priest. However, Priest had not won an apparent majority, which was required for election to the State Senate under the state constitution. Had no candidate won a majority, the election would have been decided by the whole General Court, which was narrowly controlled by Republicans, likely guaranteeing that Head would be selected. However, Governor James A. Weston and the Democratic majority on the Executive Council rejected all votes cast for Head on the grounds that they "did not contain the full Christian name of the candidate voted for," which made Priest the winner. Priest, along with John Proctor, another Democratic State Senator who was similarly selected, were both seated by the State Senate. The Democratic majority in the Senate ratified the Governor's actions and rejected, on party lines, a challenge to Priest's and Proctor's qualifications. The Republican majority in the State House sought an advisory opinion from the state supreme court, which ultimately concluded that the action of the State Senate was final and unreviewable.

Head was subsequently elected to the State Senate in 1876 and 1877 and served as the President Pro Tempore in his second term.

In the 1878 election, Head was elected governor and served as the state's first governor elected to a two-year term. During his governorship construction on the state prison begun under his predecessors was completed and the facility became operational. The state also enacted child labor laws and passed railroad safety measures, including one requiring a telegraph in all railroad stations to facilitate emergency communications.

After leaving office Head returned to his business interests. He died in Hooksett on November 12, 1883, at the age of fifty-five, and was buried at Head Cemetery in Hooksett.

Party political offices
Preceded by Benjamin F. Prescott	Republican nominee for Governor of New Hampshire; November 1878	Succeeded by Charles H. Bell
Political offices
Preceded by Benjamin F. Prescott	Governor of New Hampshire; 1879–1881	Succeeded by Charles H. Bell
