= Richard D. Hubbard =

American politician (1818–1884)

Richard Dudley Hubbard
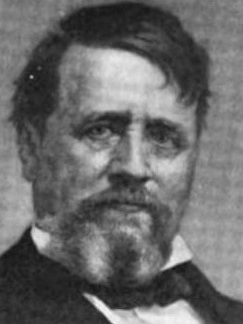

48th Governor of Connecticut
- In office January 3, 1877 – January 9, 1879
- Lieutenant: Francis Loomis
- Preceded by: Charles R. Ingersoll
- Succeeded by: Charles B. Andrews

Member of the U.S. House of Representatives from Connecticut's 1st district
- In office March 4, 1867 – March 3, 1869
- Preceded by: Henry C. Deming
- Succeeded by: Julius L. Strong

Member of the Connecticut House of Representatives
- In office 1842; 1855; 1858

Personal details
- Born: September 7, 1818 Berlin, Connecticut, US
- Died: February 28, 1884 (aged 65)
- Party: Democratic
- Spouse: Mary Juliana Morgan Hubbard
- Education: Yale University
- Profession: Attorney, legislator

Richard Dudley Hubbard (September 7, 1818 – February 28, 1884) was a United States representative and the 48th governor of Connecticut.

== Biography ==
Born in Berlin, Connecticut, he was orphaned while young, he pursued preparatory studies at East Hartford and graduated from Yale College in 1839, where he was a member of Skull and Bones. He studied law, was admitted to the bar in 1842 and commenced practice in Hartford. He married Mary Juliana Morgan and they had six children.

== Career ==
Hubbard was a member of the Connecticut House of Representatives in 1842, 1855, and again in 1858, and was prosecuting attorney for Hartford County from 1846 to 1868. A lifelong Democrat, he nevertheless supported the Federal government throughout the Civil War.

Hubbard was elected as a Democrat to the Fortieth Congress, holding office from March 4, 1867 to March 3, 1869. He declined to be a candidate for renomination in 1868 and resumed the practice of law in Hartford. He was the nominee for governor in the 1872 election, but lost to Marshall Jewell.

He was a delegate to Democratic National Convention from Connecticut, 1876 and a member of the Resolutions Committee.

In November 1876 Hubbard was elected Governor of Connecticut, the first to be elected to a two-year term. He successfully advocated for legislation that altered the property rights of women, "making husband and wife equal in property rights." Also, a bill was constituted that formed the State Board of Health; a commission was formed that managed Connecticut's dams and reservoirs, and regulations were amended that benefited the insurance industry. In January 1878, Hubbard served on the committee that established the American Bar Association. He was an unsuccessful candidate for reelection as governor in 1878. He engaged in the practice of law from 1877 until his death in Hartford.

== Death and legacy ==
Hubbard died of Bright's disease on February 28, 1884. He is interred at Cedar Hill Cemetery.

A statue of Hubbard is on the east lawn of the Connecticut State Capitol in Hartford with a plaque that describes him as "Lawyer, Orator, Statesman."

Party political offices
Preceded by James E. English	Democratic nominee for Governor of Connecticut; 1872	Succeeded by Charles Roberts Ingersoll
Preceded by Charles Roberts Ingersoll	Democratic nominee for Governor of Connecticut; November 1876, 1878	Succeeded by James E. English
U.S. House of Representatives
Preceded by Henry C. Deming	Member of the U.S. House of Representatives from Connecticut's 1st congressional district March 4, 1867 – March 3, 1869	Succeeded by Julius L. Strong
Political offices
Preceded by Charles Roberts Ingersoll	Governor of Connecticut; 1877–1879	Succeeded by Charles B. Andrews
