= Benjamin Franklin Prescott House =

Historic house in New Hampshire, United States

- U.S. National Register of Historic Places
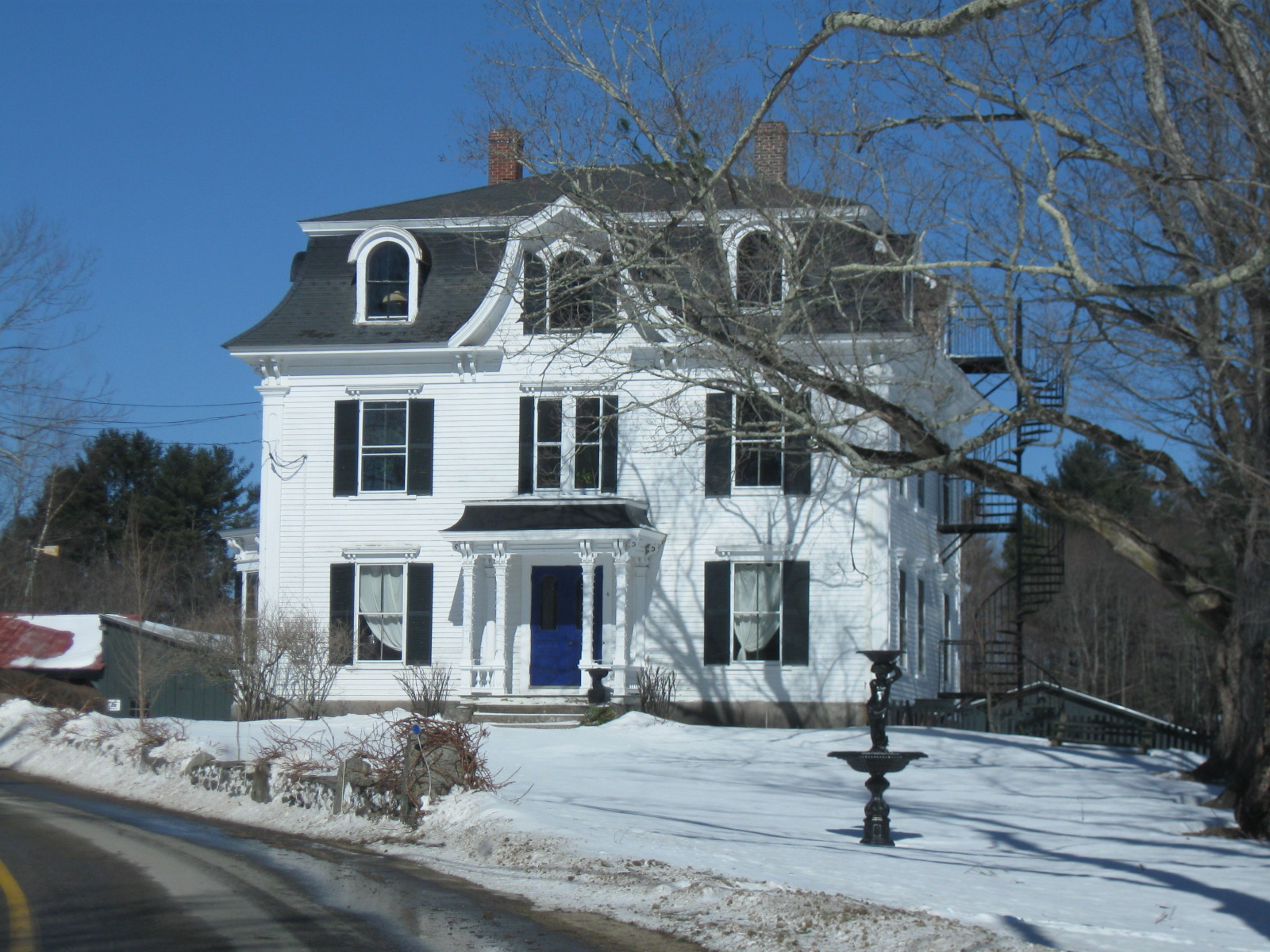

- Location within New Hampshire Location within the United States
- Location: Prescott Rd., Epping, New Hampshire
- Coordinates: 43°3′2″N 71°5′55″W
- Area: less than one acre
- Built: 1875
- Built by: Stone, Gilman C.
- Architectural style: Second Empire
- NRHP reference No.: 87002069
- Added to NRHP: December 3, 1987

The Benjamin Franklin Prescott House is a historic house on Prescott Street in Epping, New Hampshire. Built in 1875 for politician (and future Governor of New Hampshire) Benjamin Franklin Prescott, it is the town's finest example of Second Empire architecture. It was listed on the National Register of Historic Places in 1987.

== Description and history ==
The Benjamin Franklin Prescott House stands in a rural setting west of the center of Epping, on the east side of Prescott Street south of its junction with Dearborn Street. It is sited prominently facing south at a bend in the road. It is a 2 1/2-story wood-frame structure, covered by a bellcast mansard roof with flared eaves, and sheathed in wooden clapboards. It has paneled cornerboards, paired brackets in the eaves, and a richly detailed front portico. A 1 1/2-story ell extends to the rear of the main block. A period carriage barn is located across Prescott Street; although it has been converted to residential use, it retains Second Empire features similar to those of the house.

The house was built in 1875 for Benjamin Franklin Prescott, who was then serving in his second term as New Hampshire's Secretary of State. In 1877 he was elected to the first of two consecutive one-year terms as Governor of New Hampshire. Prescott had risen to prominence in the state as the publisher of a leading antislavery newspaper, and he was a noted local historian, serving as vice-president of the state historical society, and as a fellow of the Royal Historical Society of London. His house was sold out of the family in 1903.

== See also ==
- National Register of Historic Places listings in Rockingham County, New Hampshire
