= November 1876 Connecticut gubernatorial election =

- November 7, 1876
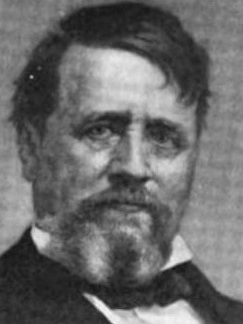

Nominee	Richard D. Hubbard	H. Robinson
Party	Democratic	Republican
Popular vote	61,934	58,514
Percentage	50.84%	48.03%
- County results Hubbard: 50–60% Robinson: 50–60% 60–70%
Governor before election
Charles Roberts Ingersoll
Democratic
Elected Governor
Richard D. Hubbard
Democratic

The November 1876 Connecticut gubernatorial election was held on November 7, 1876. Democratic nominee Richard D. Hubbard defeated Republican nominee H. Robinson with 50.84% of the vote.

This was the first gubernatorial election held in November, as previous state elections in Connecticut were held in early April. As the term length for the governor had been extended from one year to two, Hubbard would be the first governor of Connecticut to serve a two-year term, and the first whose term began in early January. The previous inauguration date was in early May.

== General election ==
=== Candidates ===
Major party candidates

- Richard D. Hubbard, Democratic
- H. Robinson, Republican

Other candidates

- Joseph Cummings, Prohibition
- Charles Atwater, Greenback

=== Results ===
November 1876 Connecticut gubernatorial election
Party	Candidate	Votes	%	±%
Democratic	Richard D. Hubbard	61,934	50.84%	
Republican	H. Robinson	58,514	48.03%	
Prohibition	Joseph Cummings	740	0.61%	
Greenback	Charles Atwater	630	0.52%	
Other	Others	6	0.01%	
Majority		3,420		
Turnout				
Democratic hold		Swing		
