= 1878 Serbian parliamentary election =

Parliamentary elections were held in Serbia on 29 October 1878 to elect the elected members of the National Assembly. The result was a victory for the Liberal Party, who formed a government led by Jovan Ristić.

== Background ==
The elections occurred at the end of the Serbian–Ottoman Wars and after the Treaty of Berlin, which saw Serbia officially recognised as an independent country, which was proclaimed in August. As a result of the war, Serbia's territory had expanded and the right to vote was extended to newly gained areas. As a result, a total of 129 members were to be elected, with Prince Milan able to appoint a further 43.

== Results ==
The Liberal Party won the elections, although had to rely on voter intimidation to ensure a majority of seats (in one area a group of police went from town-to-town threatening anyone who voted against the government). The opposition won 40 seats, many of them in eastern Serbia, which had been the area worst affected by the wars.

== Aftermath ==
The new Assembly convened on 21 November in newly liberated Niš, meeting in an old primary school near the cathedral. Todor Tucaković was appointed president of the National Assembly and Vuja Vasić as vice president.
