= November 1878 New Hampshire gubernatorial election =

- November 5, 1878
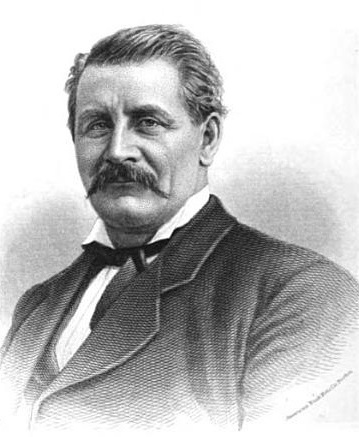

Nominee	Nathaniel Head	Frank A. McKean	Warren G. Brown
Party	Republican	Democratic	Greenback
Popular vote	38,175	31,135	6,507
Percentage	50.26%	40.99%	8.57%
- County results Head: 40–50% 50–60% McKean: 40–50% 50–60%
Governor before election
Benjamin F. Prescott
Republican
Elected Governor
Nathaniel Head
Republican

The November 1878 New Hampshire gubernatorial election was held on November 5, 1878. Republican nominee Nathaniel Head defeated Democratic nominee Frank A. McKean with 50.26% of the vote.

== General election ==
=== Candidates ===
Major party candidates

- Nathaniel Head, Republican
- Frank A. McKean, Democratic

Other candidates

- Warren G. Brown, Greenback
- Asa S. Kendall, Prohibition

=== Results ===
November 1878 New Hampshire gubernatorial election
Party	Candidate	Votes	%	±%
Republican	Nathaniel Head	38,175	50.26%	
Democratic	Frank A. McKean	31,135	40.99%	
Greenback	Warren G. Brown	6,507	8.57%	
Prohibition	Asa S. Kendall	91	0.12%	
Scattering		51	0.07%	
Majority		7,040		
Turnout				
Republican hold		Swing		
