= Sheakleyville, Pennsylvania =

Borough in Pennsylvania, US

- Borough
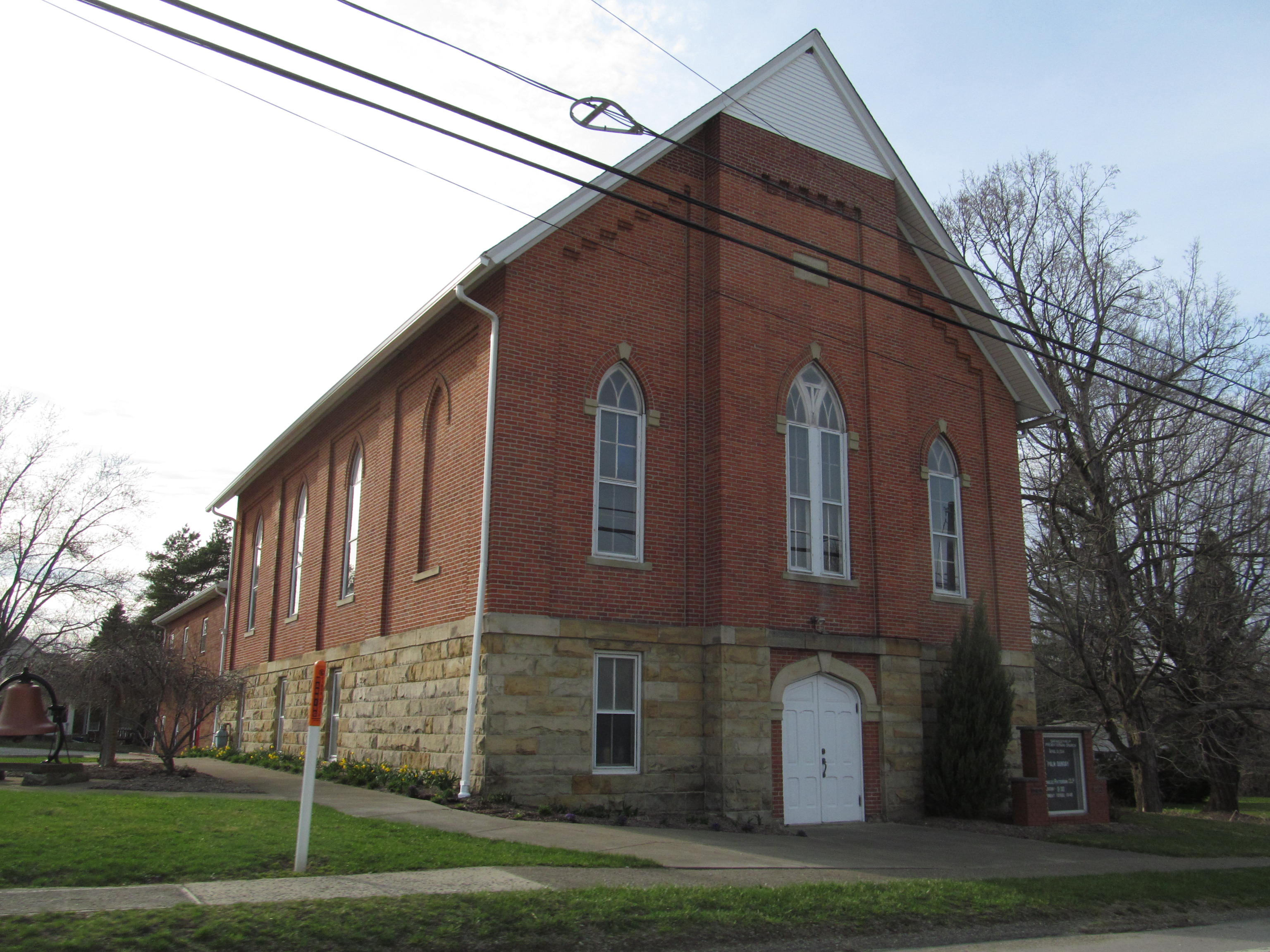
- Church in Sheakleyville

- Location of Sheakleyville in Mercer County, Pennsylvania.

- Location of Sheakleyville within Pennsylvania
- Coordinates: 41°26′36″N 80°12′26″W
- Country: United States
- State: Pennsylvania
- County: Mercer
- Established: 1820

Area
  - Total: 0.20 sq mi (0.51 km^{2})
  - Land: 0.20 sq mi (0.51 km^{2})
  - Water: 0 sq mi (0.00 km^{2})
- Elevation (center of borough): 1,282 ft (391 m)
- Highest elevation (southern border of borough): 1,298 ft (396 m)
- Lowest elevation (Mill Run): 1,240 ft (380 m)

Population (2020)
  - Total: 151
  - Density: 769.1/sq mi (296.94/km^{2})
- Time zone: UTC-4 (EST)
  - Summer (DST): UTC-5 (EDT)
- Zip code: 16151
- Area codes: 724, 878
- FIPS code: 42-69936

Sheakleyville is a borough in northern Mercer County, Pennsylvania, United States. The population was 142 at the 2010 census, a figure which increased to 150 tabulated residents in 2020. It is part of the Hermitage micropolitan area.

== Geography ==
Sheakleyville is located at 41°26′36″N 80°12′26″W (41.443244, -80.207305).

According to the United States Census Bureau, the borough has a total area of 0.2 square miles (0.52 km^{2}), all land.

== Demographics ==
Historical population
Census	Pop.	Note	%±
1860	218		—
1870	273		25.2%
1880	222		−18.7%
1890	191		−14.0%
1900	164		−14.1%
1910	126		−23.2%
1920	108		−14.3%
1930	93		−13.9%
1940	138		48.4%
1950	141		2.2%
1960	138		−2.1%
1970	141		2.2%
1980	155		9.9%
1990	145		−6.5%
2000	164		13.1%
2010	142		−13.4%
2020	151		6.3%
2021 (est.)	149	▼	−1.3%
U.S. Decennial Census

As of the census of 2000, there were 164 people, 65 households, and 49 families residing in the borough. The population density was 1,023.0 inhabitants per square mile (395.0/km^{2}). There were 71 housing units at an average density of 442.9 per square mile (171.0/km^{2}). The racial makeup of the borough was 98.17% White, 0.61% Native American, and 1.22% from two or more races. 29.6% were of German, 22.6% American, 15.7% English and 9.6% Dutch ancestry according to Census 2000.

There were 65 households, out of which 33.8% had children under the age of 18 living with them, 67.7% were married couples living together, 6.2% had a female householder with no husband present, and 23.1% were non-families. 20.0% of all households were made up of individuals, and 12.3% had someone living alone who was 65 years of age or older. The average household size was 2.52 and the average family size was 2.92.

In the borough the population was spread out, with 21.3% under the age of 18, 8.5% from 18 to 24, 28.0% from 25 to 44, 26.8% from 45 to 64, and 15.2% who were 65 years of age or older. The median age was 40 years. For every 100 females there were 105.0 males. For every 100 females age 18 and over, there were 92.5 males.

The median income for a household in the borough was $28,750, and the median income for a family was $38,750. Males had a median income of $32,813 versus $22,083 for females. The per capita income for the borough was $15,479. About 4.1% of families and 9.5% of the population were below the poverty line, including 16.2% of those under the age of eighteen and 18.8% of those sixty five or over.
