= William D. Fenton House =

Historic building in Portland, Oregon, U.S.

- U.S. National Register of Historic Places
- Portland Historic Landmark
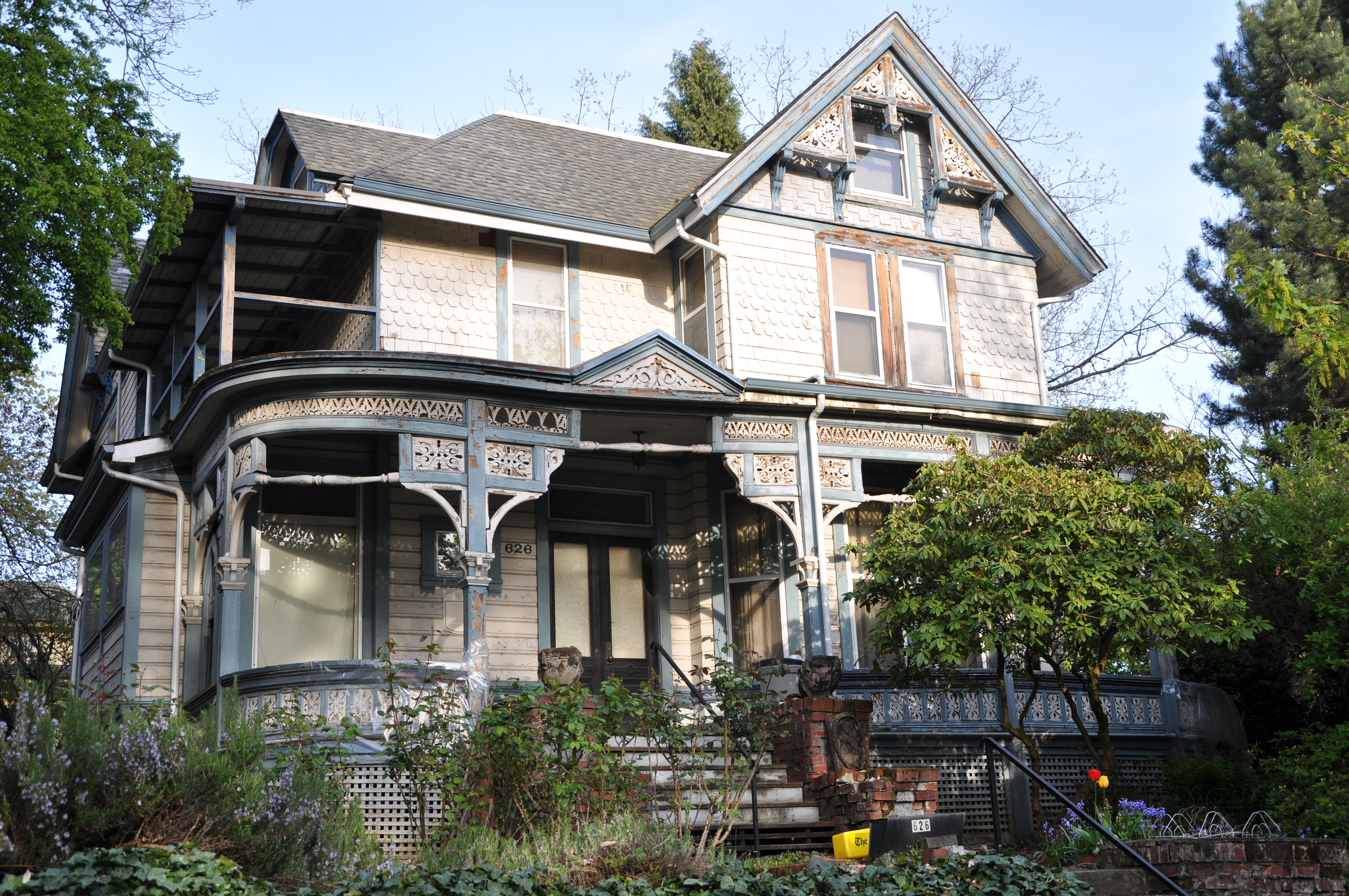
- William D. Fenton House in 2011
- Location: 626 SE 16th Avenue; Portland, Oregon
- Coordinates: 45°31′05″N 122°38′57″W
- Built: 1892
- Architectural style: Queen Anne
- NRHP reference No.: 79002145
- Added to NRHP: August 29, 1979

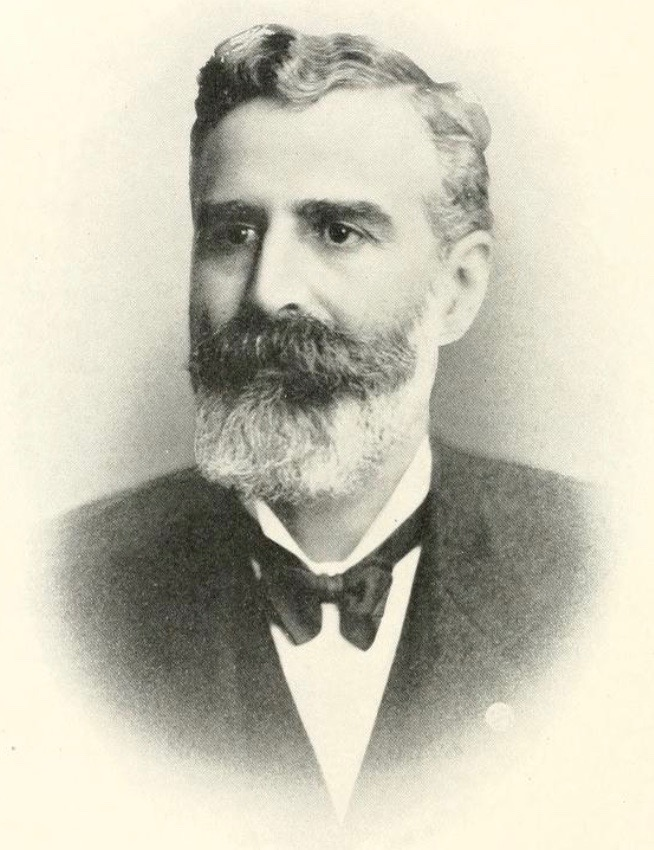
William D. Fenton

The William D. Fenton House in southeast Portland in the U.S. state of Oregon is a 2.5-story, single-family dwelling listed on the National Register of Historic Places. Built in the Queen Anne style in 1892, it was added to the register in 1979.

Notable features of the asymmetrical house include many porches and projections, intricate decorative elements, variegated siding, a wrap-around veranda, a flare-top chimney, and a stained-glass side door. Much of the original interior woodwork, including the wainscoting and trim, is intact. The parlor and the master bedroom have elaborate fireplaces.

Fenton (1853–1925), for whom the house was built, was a prominent lawyer and the general counsel for the Southern Pacific Railroad in Oregon. In 1865, at age 12, he moved by wagon train from Missouri to Portland with his family. After his admission to the Oregon bar in 1875, he was elected to the state legislature as a Democrat. He moved to Portland in 1885, where he worked for the railroad and other corporations. Fenton, one of the founders of the Oregon Historical Society, helped set up the Lewis and Clark Centennial Exposition in Portland in 1905. Fenton Hall, which housed the University of Oregon School of Law from 1937 through 1970, was renamed for him in 1938.

== See also ==
- National Register of Historic Places listings in Southeast Portland, Oregon
