= 1878 Luxembourg general election =

Partial general elections were held in Luxembourg on 11 June 1878, electing members of the Chamber of Deputies. The elections took place in Echternach, Esch-sur-Alzette, Luxembourg-Campagne, Mersch, Remich, and Wiltz.

Under the election law at the time, any second-round run-off votes took place on the same day as the first round.

== Results ==
Candidates who were successful are in bold.

Canton	Seats	Candidate	First round	Second round
Canton	Seats	Candidate	Votes	Votes
Echternach		**Jean-Mathias Föhr (Note: Elected in the first round)**	219	
Echternach		**Theisen**	163	
Echternach		**Joseph Brincour (Note: Elected in the run-off)**	154	176
Echternach		Emile Lefort	131	134
Echternach		Jean-Pierre Even	119	
Echternach		**Turnout**	320	
Esch-sur-Alzette		**Pierre Kirsch**	599	
Esch-sur-Alzette		**Léon Metz**	595	
Esch-sur-Alzette		**Théodore Willibrord de Wacquant**	551	
Esch-sur-Alzette		**De Brasseur**	548	
Esch-sur-Alzette		De Tornaco	386	
Esch-sur-Alzette		Klensch	376	
Esch-sur-Alzette		Claude	289	
Esch-sur-Alzette		**Turnout**	917	
Luxembourg-Campagne		**J.-P. Pescatore**	533	
Luxembourg-Campagne		**Adolphe Fischer**	502	
Luxembourg-Campagne		**Auguste Laval-Metz**	491	
Luxembourg-Campagne		**P. de Lafontaine**	385	
Luxembourg-Campagne		**Collart**	343	
Luxembourg-Campagne		Welbes	252	
Luxembourg-Campagne		Klein	179	
Luxembourg-Campagne		**Turnout**	681	
Mersch		**Schröder**	197	
Mersch		**Knaff**	196	
Mersch		Emile Servais	184	109
Mersch		**Jean Souvignier**	181	244
Mersch		Jurion	173	
Mersch		Ruth	168	
Mersch		**Turnout**	371	
Remich		**Knepper**	313	
Remich		**Alfred Welter**	272	
Remich		**Jacques-Guillaume Lessel**	233	
Remich		Majerus	222	
Remich		Ulveling	167	
Remich		**Turnout**	464	
Wiltz		**Michel Weinandy**	438	
Wiltz		**Jean-Joseph-Georges Faber-Knepper**	325	
Wiltz		**Mertens**	241	293
Wiltz		Pletschette	217	219
Wiltz		Servais	169	
Wiltz		**Turnout**	525	
