= Francis Loomis (Connecticut politician) =

American politician (1812–1892)

Francis B. Loomis
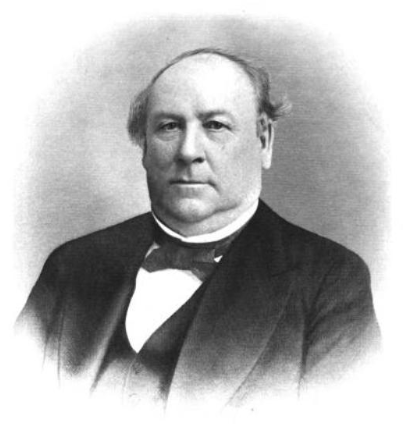

Lieutenant Governor of Connecticut
- In office 1877–1879
- Governor: Richard D. Hubbard

Personal details
- Born: April 9, 1812 Lyme, Connecticut, U.S.
- Died: July 13, 1892 (aged 80) Hartford, Connecticut, U.S.
- Party: Democratic
- Spouses: Elizabeth M. Inghram (m. 1836; died 1839) Angenora Beckwith (m. 1842)
- Children: 4
- Occupation: Politician

Francis B. Loomis (April 9, 1812–July 13, 1892) from New London, Connecticut, was an American politician of the Democratic Party who was the 58th lieutenant governor of Connecticut from 1877 to 1879 under Governor Richard D. Hubbard. In this function he also presided over the Connecticut Senate.

== Biography ==
Francis Loomis was born in Lyme, Connecticut, on April 9, 1812. He attended a private school, and upon reaching adulthood, began working in the wool manufacturing business. He was very successful, opening several textile mills. He also served as president of the First National Bank in his hometown.

He married Elizabeth M. Inghram on December 20, 1836, and they had one daughter. His wife died on March 20, 1839. He remarried on May 3, 1842, to Angenora Beckwith. They had three children.

In politics, he was initially a Whig, and then a Republican, but joined the Democratic Party in 1872.

He died in Hartford on July 13, 1892.

Political offices
Preceded by George G. Sill	Lieutenant Governor of Connecticut; 1877-1879	Succeeded by David Gallup
