= 1878 Connecticut gubernatorial election =

- November 5, 1878
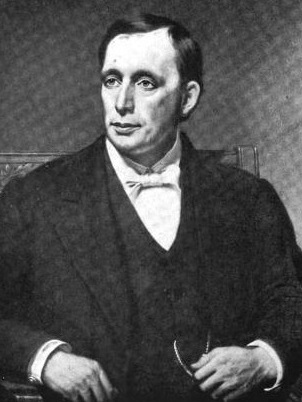

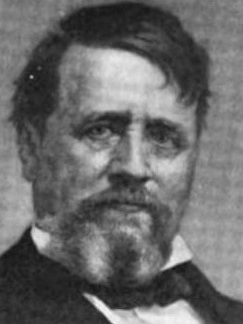

Nominee	Charles B. Andrews	Richard D. Hubbard	Charles Atwater
Party	Republican	Democratic	Greenback
Popular vote	48,867	46,385	8,314
Percentage	46.66%	44.29%	7.94%
- Andrews: 40–50% 50–60% 60–70% 70–80% Hubbard: 30–40% 40–50% 50–60% 60–70% 70–80% Atwater: 30–40% 40–50% No Data/Vote
Governor before election
Richard D. Hubbard
Democratic
Elected Governor
Charles B. Andrews
Republican

The 1878 Connecticut gubernatorial election was held on November 5, 1878. Republican nominee Charles B. Andrews defeated Democratic incumbent governor Richard D. Hubbard with 46.66% of the vote.

As no candidate had won a majority of the vote, the Republican-controlled state legislature elected Andrews, who had received a plurality.

== General election ==
=== Candidates ===
Major party candidates

- Charles B. Andrews, Republican
- Richard D. Hubbard, Democratic

Other candidates

- Charles Atwater, Greenback
- Jesse G. Baldwin, Prohibition

=== Results ===
1878 Connecticut gubernatorial election
Party	Candidate	Votes	%	±%
Republican	Charles B. Andrews	48,867	46.66%	
Democratic	Richard D. Hubbard (incumbent)	46,385	44.29%	
Greenback	Charles Atwater	8,314	7.94%	
Prohibition	Jesse G. Baldwin	1,079	1.03%	
Other	Others	94	0.09%	
Plurality		2,482		
Turnout				
Republican gain from Democratic		Swing		
