= Lewis R. Bradley =

American politician

2nd Governor of Nevada
- In office January 2, 1871 – January 6, 1879
- Lieutenant: Frank Denver; Pressly C. Hyman; Jewett W. Adams
- Preceded by: Henry G. Blasdel
- Succeeded by: John H. Kinkead

Personal details
- Born: Lewis Rice Bradley; February 18, 1805 Orange County, Virginia
- Died: March 21, 1879 (aged 74) Elko, Nevada
- Resting place: Elko City Cemetery
- Party: Democratic
- Spouse: Virginia Hode Willis (m. 1835; died 1852)
- Children: 1

Lewis Rice "Broadhorns" Bradley (February 18, 1805 – March 21, 1879) was an American politician who was the second governor of Nevada from 1871 to 1879. He was a member of the Democratic Party.

He was born on February 18, 1805, in Orange County, Virginia. When he was thirteen years old, his father died and he quit school and became a mule trader to support his mother and his many younger siblings. He married Virginia Hode Willis and the couple had three children. He moved to Missouri, the mule capital of the nation. His wife, Virginia, died May 11, 1852, in Fayette, Howard County, Missouri.

== Career ==
In 1852, Bradley and his son, John R. Bradley, bought a herd of Texas Longhorn cattle and pushed them west, earning him the nickname "Old Broadhorns", and arriving in the San Joaquin Valley, California, with a 40% loss. He settled in Stockton, California, and drove horses, mules, and sheep in from Missouri. The winter and spring floods of 1861 and 1862 ruined their lands, and the Bradleys moved to Nevada where he worked in the cattle business in Elko County, near Jiggs.

Bradley, running for governor, bought a defunct newspaper, "The Daily Inland Empire", used it as a campaigning tool, then let it go under again. He served two terms as governor, but was narrowly defeated for the third time he ran as governor. Since he was a widower, his daughter, Virginia, acted as his official hostess during his term. In 1959, he was inducted into the Hall of Great Westerners of the National Cowboy & Western Heritage Museum.

== Death ==
Bradley died on March 21, 1879, in Elko, Nevada, at the age of 74. He is interred at Elko City Cemetery in Elko.

Party political offices
Preceded by John D. Winters	Democratic nominee for Governor of Nevada; 1870, 1874, 1878	Succeeded by Jewett W. Adams
Political offices
Preceded by Henry G. Blasdel	Governor of Nevada; 1871–1879	Succeeded by John Henry Kinkead
