= Benjamin F. Prescott =

American politician (1833-1895)

Benjamin Franklin Prescott
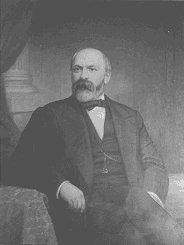

36th Governor of New Hampshire
- In office June 7, 1877 – June 5, 1879
- Preceded by: Person Colby Cheney
- Succeeded by: Nathaniel Head

Secretary of State of New Hampshire
- In office 1875 – 1876; 1872 – 1873

Personal details
- Born: February 26, 1833 Epping, New Hampshire
- Died: February 21, 1895 (aged 61) Epping, New Hampshire
- Party: Republican

Benjamin Franklin Prescott (February 26, 1833 – February 21, 1895) was an American lawyer, newspaper editor, and politician from Epping, New Hampshire, who served as the 36th governor of New Hampshire.

== Early life and education ==
Benjamin F. Prescott was born in Epping, New Hampshire, on February 26, 1833. He attended Pembroke Academy and Phillips Exeter Academy before graduating from Dartmouth College in 1856.

== Career ==
Prescott studied law and was admitted to the New Hampshire Bar Association. He then established a private legal practice in Concord, New Hampshire and became active in the Republican Party. He served as secretary of the Republican State Committee from 1859 to 1874. He was also secretary of New Hampshire's Electoral College members every four years from 1860 to 1880.

In 1859, Prescott became editor of the Independent Democrat, a Republican newspaper that opposed slavery and endorsed the Abraham Lincoln administration.

Prescott was a New England special agent for the United States Department of the Treasury from 1865 to 1869, responsible to audit and report on the activities of customs collectors at border crossing and ports. He was New Hampshire Secretary of State from 1872 to 1873 and 1875 to 1876.

In 1877, Prescott was elected to a one-year term as governor. He was reelected in 1878, and served from June 7, 1877, to June 5, 1879. During his term, the state constitution was revised and construction began on a new state prison in Concord.

Prescott remained active in politics after leaving office, serving as chairman of the 1880 state Republican convention and a Delegate to the 1880 Republican National Convention. From 1887 to 1893, Prescott served on the state New Hampshire Board of Railroad Commissioners.

In addition to his political activities, Prescott was an author and was involved with several historical organizations. He was vice president of the New Hampshire Historical Society, President of the Bennington Battle Monument Commission, and a Fellow of Great Britain's Royal Historical Society. He was also a trustee of the New Hampshire College of Agriculture and the Mechanic Arts and Dartmouth College.

== Personal life ==
Prescott died in Epping on February 21, 1895. He was buried at Blossom Hill Cemetery in Concord. The Benjamin Franklin Prescott House is listed on the National Register of Historic Places.

Party political offices
Preceded by Person Colby Cheney	Republican nominee for Governor of New Hampshire; 1877, March 1878	Succeeded by Nathaniel Head
Political offices
Preceded by Person C. Cheney	Governor of New Hampshire; 1877–1879	Succeeded by Nathaniel Head
