= John Henry Kinkead =

American politician

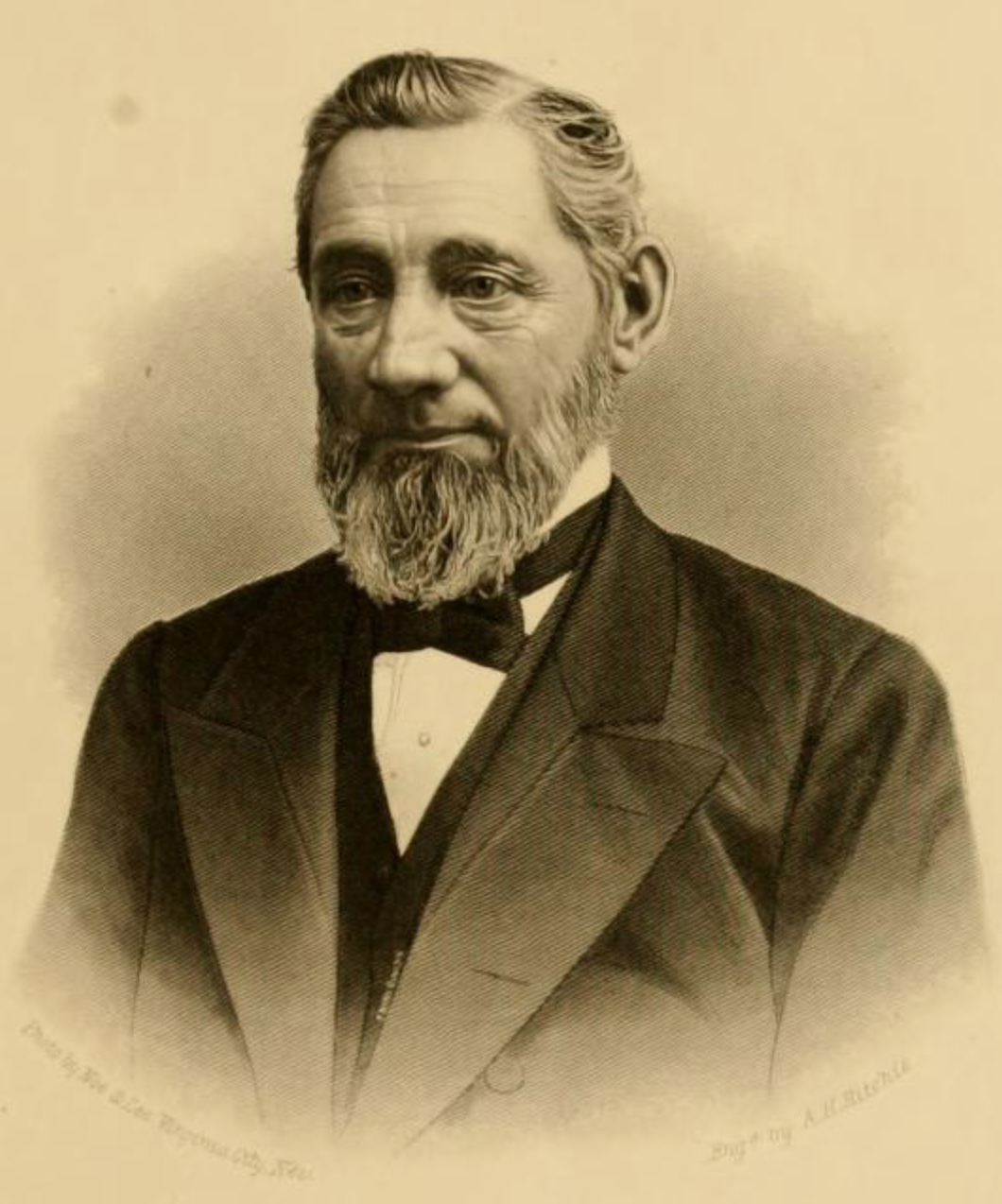

1st Governor of District of Alaska
- In office July 4, 1884 – May 9, 1885
- Nominated by: Chester A. Arthur
- Preceded by: LCDR Henry E. Nichols, USN (as Commander of the Department of Alaska)
- Succeeded by: Alfred P. Swineford

3rd Governor of Nevada
- In office January 6, 1879 – January 1, 1883
- Lieutenant: Jewett W. Adams
- Preceded by: Lewis R. Bradley
- Succeeded by: Jewett W. Adams

Personal details
- Born: December 10, 1826 Somerset County, Pennsylvania
- Died: August 15, 1904 (aged 77) Carson City, Nevada
- Party: Republican
- Spouse: Elizabeth Fall

John Henry Kinkead (December 10, 1826 – August 15, 1904) was an American businessman and politician who served as the third governor of Nevada and the first governor of the District of Alaska. Spending most of his life in the dry goods business, he was also Treasurer of Nevada Territory, a member of the Nevada Constitutional Convention in 1864, and the first United States official to hold office in Alaska.

== Background ==
Kinkead was born in the now defunct town of Smithfield in Somerset County, Pennsylvania, on October 10, 1826, to Catherine (Bushey) and James S. Kinkead. He attended elementary school in Zanesville, Ohio, and high school in Lancaster, Ohio. At age 18, Kinkead became a clerk at a dry goods store. In 1849, he moved to Salt Lake City, Utah where, with I. M. Livingston, he founded the dry goods firm Livingston & Kinkead.

In 1854 Kinkead moved to California, working at various jobs before settling in Marysville. There, on January 1, 1856, he married Elizabeth Falls. The marriage produced no children. However, much later, they adopted a boy named Kahtz from Alaska. He died at the age of 12. During 1856, Kinkead attempted to establish a dry goods business in New York City. Unsuccessful in this effort, he returned to California at the end of the year. There Kinkead suffered a series of business setbacks.

== Early political career ==
Prompted by the discovery of silver in the area, Kinkead moved to Carson City, Utah Territory. While operating his dry goods store, he became involved in the organization of Nevada Territory. Kinkead was appointed Nevada's first Territorial Treasurer, a position he held from 1862 to 1864, and in 1864 served as a member of the Nevada Constitutional Convention.

By mid-1867, Kinkead was without work and journeyed to Alaska with the "Occupancy" Commission. As part of the commission, he witnessed the transfer of Alaska from Russian to American possession. He also became the first United States official to hold office in Alaska when he was appointed postmaster by President Andrew Johnson. In addition to his postal duties, Kinkead operated a trading post and served as Sitka, Alaska's unofficial mayor.

== Governorships ==
Kinkead returned to Nevada in 1871, settling in the town of Unionville. There he engaged in various milling, mining, and mercantile efforts within Humboldt and Lander counties. His efforts during this period included founding Washoe City, building smelters in Pleasant Valley and Austin, and becoming an early promoter for the Virginia and Truckee Railroad.

Running on the Republican ticket, Kinkead was elected Governor of Nevada for the term running from January 1, 1879, to January 1, 1883. He was an opponent of Chinese immigration, stating in his inaugural address that:

We of this coast have, by years of unfortunate experience, come to realize and condemn the suicidal policy which encourages or tolerates the influx of this uncivilized [Chinese] race, with its burden of moral and physical corruption. Chinese immigration unrestricted, signifies Chinese domination in every department of labor in which cheap handiwork can compete with our own labor.

While in office he supported mining efforts, creation of toll roads, and the interests of the Virginia and Truckee Railroad. At the end of his term, the governor declined to run for reelection.

Acting on the recommendation of U.S. Senator John P. Jones, President Chester Arthur appointed Kinkead as governor of the new formed District of Alaska on July 4, 1884. Arriving at his new post in early September, his only gubernatorial report was submitted in October. In the report he asked for establishment of a legal code and creation of a tax collection agency for the district, a boat to allow the governor to travel within Alaska, expanded financial aid, and initiation of new mail services.

During his term, Kinkead suffered a broken arm and a stroke. He also had to deal with a rift between himself and influential Presbyterian missionary Sheldon Jackson, who differed with the governor on the trustworthiness of the district's mining interests. Upon the instigation of the Alaskan District Attorney, the missionary was arrested on trumped up charges. The resulting scandal gained national attention with the governor receiving a portion of the blame for the incident. Kinkead submitted his resignation on May 9, 1885.

After leaving office, Kinkead returned to Carson City, Nevada, and resumed his mining and mercantile efforts. He died on August 15, 1904, and was buried in the Lone Mountain Cemetery.

Party political offices
Preceded by J.C. Hazlett	Republican nominee for Governor of Nevada; 1878	Succeeded by Enoch Strother
Political offices
Preceded by Lewis R. Bradley	Governors of Nevada; 1879–1883	Succeeded by Jewett W. Adams
Preceded by LCDR Henry E. Nichols, USN (as Commander of the Department of Alaska)	District Governor of Alaska; 1884–1885	Succeeded by Alfred P. Swineford
