= Alfred P. Swineford =

American journalist and politician (1836–1909)

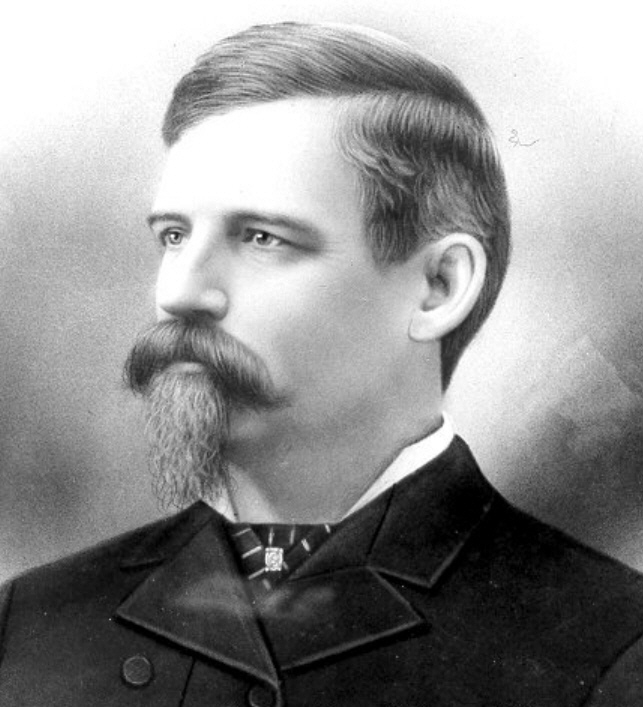

2nd Governor of District of Alaska
- In office September 1885 – April 20, 1889
- Nominated by: Grover Cleveland
- Preceded by: John Henry Kinkead
- Succeeded by: Lyman Enos Knapp

Personal details
- Born: September 14, 1836 Ashland, Ohio
- Died: October 26, 1909 (aged 73) Juneau, Alaska
- Party: Democratic
- Spouse(s): Psyche Cyntheria Flower (1875-1881); Wilhelmina "Minnie" Smith (1886-)
- Relatives: Allen Shattuck (step-son-in-law)

Alfred Peter Swineford (September 14, 1836 – October 26, 1909) was an American journalist and politician who served as the second Governor of District of Alaska. He trained as a printer, worked in Minnesota and Wisconsin before becoming the editor and publisher of the Mining Journal in Marquette, Michigan. From this base he became active in politics and was elected Mayor of Marquette and to a term in the Michigan House of Representatives before his appointment as governor.

== Background ==
Swineford was born in Ashland, Ohio, on September 14, 1836. He was educated in local public schools before being apprenticed at age 15 to a printer, first in Ashford and later in Columbus, Ohio. At the end of his apprenticeship, in 1853, he began Albert Lea, Minnesota's first newspaper, the Southern Star. From there he started the Banner in La Crescent before establishing the Union Democrat in La Crosse.

In 1860, Swineford sold his interests in his newspapers and moved to Milwaukee, Wisconsin, where he published the Daily Inquirer. He became head of Oshkosh's Review in 1864 before moving to Fond du Lac to operate the Democratic Press a year later. Swineford moved to Negaunee, Michigan, in 1867 where he joined the Mining and Manufacturing News. Following a merger of papers he became editor and publisher of the Mining Journal in Marquette. He remained in this position until 1884.

Swineford married Psyche Cyntheria Flower in January 1875 in Oshkosh, Wisconsin. The marriage produced one daughter before Psyche's death in 1881. In 1886 he married Wilhelmina Smith, adopting her daughter Agnes.

== Michigan politics ==
While in Michigan, Swineford became active in Democratic politics. In 1871, he was elected to a seat in the Michigan House of Representatives. This was followed by his selection as a delegate to the 1872 Democratic National Convention. The first of time he was selected, he later served as a delegate during the 1884 convention.

In 1883, Swineford was selected as State Commissioner of Mineral Statistics for Michigan. He also made an unsuccessful run for Lieutenant Governor of Michigan that year. He began a two-year term as mayor of Marquette, Michigan, in 1884. Swineford also was Michigan's representative to the World Cotton Centennial in New Orleans.

== Alaska ==
President Grover Cleveland appointed Swineford as Governor of the District of Alaska on May 9, 1885. He supported granting Alaska territorial status.

Following the inauguration of President Benjamin Harrison, Swineford's term of office ended on April 20, 1889.

== Later life ==
After leaving office, Swineford returned to Michigan. In 1893, with the return of President Cleveland to the White House, many Alaskans hoped the former governor would be reappointed to office. President Cleveland, bowing to special interests opposed to Swineford, instead appointed him Inspector General of the United States General Land Office. In this office he oversaw the 1898 opening of the Cherokee Outlet.

In 1898, Swineford moved back to Alaska. That same year he published the book, Alaska: Its History, Climate and Natural Resources, Hardcover. In alignment with his mining interests, he published the Ketchikan Mining Journal from 1901 till 1905 and the Ketchikan Mines from 1907 till 1908. Swineford died in Juneau, Alaska, on October 26, 1909. He is buried in Juneau at Evergreen Cemetery.

Political offices
| Preceded by John Henry Kinkead | District Governor of Alaska; 1885–1889 | Succeeded by Lyman Enos Knapp |
