= March 1878 New Hampshire gubernatorial election =

- March 12, 1878
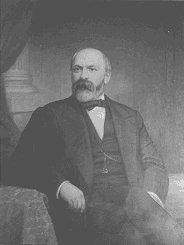

Nominee	Benjamin F. Prescott	Frank A. McKean
Party	Republican	Democratic
Popular vote	39,372	37,860
Percentage	50.60%	48.66%
- County results Prescott: 50–60% McKean: 50–60%
Governor before election
Benjamin F. Prescott
Republican
Elected Governor
Benjamin F. Prescott
Republican

The March 1878 New Hampshire gubernatorial election was held on March 12, 1878. Republican nominee Benjamin F. Prescott defeated Democratic nominee Frank A. McKean with 50.60% of the vote.

== General election ==
=== Candidates ===
Major party candidates

- Benjamin F. Prescott, Republican
- Frank A. McKean, Democratic

Other candidates

- Samuel Flint, Greenback
- Asa S. Kendall, Prohibition

=== Results ===
March 1878 New Hampshire gubernatorial election
Party	Candidate	Votes	%	±%
Republican	Benjamin F. Prescott (incumbent)	39,372	50.60%	
Democratic	Frank A. McKean	37,860	48.66%	
Greenback	Samuel Flint	269	0.35%	
Prohibition	Asa S. Kendall	225	0.29%	
Scattering		80	0.10%	
Majority		1,512		
Turnout				
Republican hold		Swing		
