= David Gallup =

American politician (1808–1882)

David Gallup (July 11, 1808 – August 15, 1882) was an American politician who was the 59th Lieutenant Governor of Connecticut from 1879 to 1881. He previously served as President pro tempore of the Connecticut Senate. He is the father-in-law of George G. Sumner.

Political offices
| Preceded by Francis Loomis | Lieutenant Governor of Connecticut; 1879-1881 | Succeeded by William H. Bulkeley |
