= United States territorial court =

Class of courts in Guam, the U.S. Virgin Islands and the Northern Mariana Islands

The United States territorial courts are tribunals established in territories of the United States by the United States Congress, pursuant to its power under Article Four of the United States Constitution, the Territorial Clause. Most United States territorial courts are defunct because the territories under their jurisdiction have become states or been retroceded.

There are three currently operating United States territorial courts:

- District Court of Guam
- District Court for the Northern Mariana Islands
- District Court of the Virgin Islands

Their jurisdiction is similar to that of United States district courts, but despite the similarity of names, they are not "United States district courts" (though they sometimes use that term). "United States district courts", created under Article III of the U.S. Constitution, exist only in United States federal judicial districts, which are found only in the 50 U.S. states, the District of Columbia, and Puerto Rico.

The territorial courts themselves, as Article IV courts, also assume the jurisdiction of a United States bankruptcy court in their respective territories; they do not have separate bankruptcy courts under their supervision, as do the Article III U.S. district courts.

Article IV judges do not have the authority to decide petitioners' appeals or be appointed to a United States Court of Appeals. The U.S. Supreme Court case Nguyen v. United States, 539 U.S. 69 (2003), presented the question of whether a panel of the Court of Appeals consisting of two Article III judges and one Article IV judge had the authority to decide petitioners' appeals. The U.S. Supreme Court declared that it did not.

There is no federal court in the territory of American Samoa. Matters of federal law arising in American Samoa have generally been adjudicated in the United States District Court for the District of Hawaii or the District Court for the District of Columbia.

== Courts in the District of Columbia and Puerto Rico ==
Though they could be considered "territorial courts" in a semantic sense (since their jurisdictions are not states), the United States District Court for the District of Columbia, the United States Court of Appeals for the District of Columbia Circuit, and the United States District Court for the District of Puerto Rico are not U.S. territorial courts since D.C. and Puerto Rico are Article III federal judicial districts.

In addition, the District of Columbia has two other local courts, the Superior Court of the District of Columbia and the District of Columbia Court of Appeals, which hear cases involving D.C. local law only. Though their jurisdiction is similar to state courts, like other federal courts they were created by Congress and their final appellate court is the Supreme Court of the United States. Like the D.C. federal courts, they are "territorial courts" in a semantic sense, but are not truly U.S. territorial courts. However, these courts are not Article III courts, as the judges serve only 15-year terms.

The American legal system includes both state courts and federal courts. Puerto Rico and the Northern Mariana Islands have their own courts which hear cases involving commonwealth law. Though they could be called "territorial courts" by some (since a U.S. commonwealth is a type of territory), they are not U.S. territorial courts as they were created by the commonwealths themselves and not by Congress; except for being in commonwealths, they are the same as state courts.

In 1961 Congress legislated to provide Puerto Rico with a judicial state-federal court structure equal to that of States. At the time, the United States Court of Appeals for the First Circuit reviewed not only judgments of the federal district court, but those of the Puerto Rico Supreme Court as well. This changed with Pub. L. 87–189, which provided that review of Puerto Rico Supreme Court judgments would now be before the U.S. Supreme Court.

On Balzac v. Porto Rico, 258 U.S. 298 (1922) the U.S. Supreme Court concluded as an argument of non-incorporation:

The United States District Court (in Puerto Rico) is not a true United States court established under Article 3 of the Constitution to administer the judicial power of the United States therein conveyed. It is created by virtue of the sovereign congressional faculty, granted under Article 4, §3, of the Constitution, of making all needful rules and regulations respecting the territory belonging to the United States. The resemblance of its jurisdiction to that of true United States courts, in offering an opportunity to nonresidents of resorting to a tribunal not subject to local influence, does not change its character as a mere territorial court.

In Glidden Co. v. Zdanok, 370 U.S. 530 (1962) supra, the court made the following statement regarding courts in unincorporated territories:

Upon like considerations, Article III has been viewed as inapplicable to courts created in unincorporated territories outside the mainland, Downes v. Bidwell, 182 U.S. 244, 266 -267; Balzac v. Porto Rico, 258 U.S. 298, 312 -313; cf. Dorr v. United States, 195 U.S. 138, 145, 149, and to the consular courts established by concessions from foreign countries, In re Ross, 140 U.S. 453, 464-465, 480.

Article Three of the United States Constitution establishes the judicial branch of the federal government. This constitutional article was expressly extended to the United States District Court for the District of Puerto Rico by the U.S. Congress through the federal law 89-571, 80 Stat. 764, and signed by the President Lyndon B. Johnson in 1966. From this moment on, judges appointed to serve on the Puerto Rico federal district court have been Article III judges appointed under the Constitution of the United States. In addition in 1984 one of the judges of the federal district court, Chief Judge Juan R. Torruella, a native of the island, was appointed to serve in the United States Court of Appeals for the First Circuit with jurisdiction over Puerto Rico, Massachusetts, Rhode Island, Maine, and New Hampshire.

In 1966 President Lyndon Johnson signed Pub. L. 89–571 which transformed the Article IV federal district court in Puerto Rico into an Article III Court. This Act of Congress was not conducted pursuant to Article IV of the Constitution, the Territorial Clause, but rather under Article III. This marks the first and only occasion in United States history in which Congress established an Article III Court in a territory other than the District of Columbia. Since then, judges appointed to serve on the Puerto Rico federal district court are Article III judges appointed under the Constitution of the United States. Like their mainland brethren they are entitled to life tenure and salary protection. Senate Report 1504 reveals the reason for the enactment of this Law:

There does not appear any reason why the U.S. District Judges for the District of Puerto Rico should not be placed in a position of parity as to tenure with all other Federal Judges throughout our judicial system. Moreover, federal litigants in Puerto Rico should not be denied the benefit of judges made independent by life tenure from the pressures of those who might influence his chances of reappointment, which benefits the Constitution guarantees to the litigants in all other Federal Courts. These judges in Puerto Rico have and will have the exacting same heavy responsibilities as all other Federal district judges and, therefore, they should have the same independence, security, and retirement benefits to which all other Federal district judges are entitled.

This important change in the federal judicial structure of the island was implemented not as a request of the Commonwealth government, but rather at the repeated request of the Judicial Conference of the United States.

Between 1966 and 2008, eighteen Article III judges were appointed to sit in the District of Puerto Rico.

== See also ==
- United States district court
- List of courts of the United States
- Federal tribunals in the United States
