= 1873 Texas Senate election =

- December 2, 1873

All 30 seats in the Texas Senate 16 seats needed for a majority
	Majority party	Minority party	Third party
Party	Democratic	Republican	Independent
Last election	15	13	2
Seats won	25	4	1 (Note: Independent listed as a Republican in some sources)
Seat change	▲10	▼9	▼1
- Democratic hold Democratic gain Republican hold Independent gain Non-district territory
President Pro Tempore before election
Edward B. Pickett
Democratic
Elected President Pro Tempore
John Ireland
Democratic

The 1873 Texas Senate elections took place as part of the 1873 Texas general election. Texas voters elected state senators in all 30 State Senate districts to staggered terms, although none of these term lengths would end up mattering. The winners of this election served in the 14th Texas Legislature which called a constitutional convention. This led to the passage of the 1876 Texas Constitution, dramatically restructuring the state's government, which forced all Senators to run for re-election in 1876 concurrently with the election for the ratification of the new constitution.

== Background ==
Democrats had gained control of the Senate in the 1872 elections the previous year, although they failed to win an outright majority due to staggered Senate terms. Despite this, the conservative coalition and even some moderate Republicans undid many of the policies enacted by the 12th Legislature. They abolished the state police and limited the powers of the governor to declare martial law. They significantly decentralized the state's schooling system as well, but they did not dismantle the economic policies of the previous legislature.

=== Redistricting ===
The 13th Legislature redrew the state's legislative districts and reapportioned seats in the House of Representatives in 1873. The legislature passed the lines, and they became law without the signature of Republican governor Edmund J. Davis. The new lines forced all members of the Senate to run for re-election in 1873.

== Results ==
Democrats made massive gains, primarily in seats that were not up for election in 1872, gaining a supermajority in the chamber. Alongside the election of Richard Coke in the concurrent gubernatorial election, they won a government trifecta. At the start of the new legislative session, Republican T.G. Davidson refused to qualify for his seat, leading it to be declared vacant. Democrat Seth Shepard won the special election to fill his seat, flipping it.

With full control of the state's government, Coke and the Democrats drafted a new constitution to present to voters for ratification, but the House of Representatives rejected this, leading instead to the calling of a constitutional convention to draft it. They called an election in August of 1875 to approve the convention and elect three delegates from each Senate district. 75 Democrats and 15 Republicans were elected to the convention. This convention sought to dramatically reshape state government, removing as much of the legacy of Republican control as possible. The convention passed the new constitution by a vote of 53–11 and it was put to voters in February 1876, concurrent with new elections for the state legislature and for governor.
