= List of elections in 1876 =

The following elections occurred in the year 1876.

== Europe ==
- 1876 Belgian general election
- 1876 Dalmatian parliamentary election
- 1876 French legislative election
- 1876 Italian general election
- 1876 Leominster by-election
- 1876 Norwegian parliamentary election
- 1876 Spanish general election

== North America ==
=== Canada ===
- 1876 Prince Edward Island general election

=== Mexico ===
- 1876 Mexican general election

=== United States ===
- 1876 New York state election
- 1876 United States elections

==== United States Presidential ====
- 1876 United States presidential election

==== United States Senate ====
- 1876 and 1877 United States Senate elections

==== United States House of Representatives ====
- 1876 United States House of Representatives elections
- United States House of Representatives elections in California, 1876
- United States House of Representatives elections in Florida, 1876
- United States House of Representatives elections in South Carolina, 1876

==== United States lieutenant gubernatorial ====
- April 1876 Connecticut lieutenant gubernatorial election
- 1876 Illinois lieutenant gubernatorial election
- 1876 Missouri lieutenant gubernatorial election
- 1876 Nebraska lieutenant gubernatorial election
- 1876 Texas lieutenant gubernatorial election

==== United States gubernatorial ====
- 1876 Alabama gubernatorial election
- 1876 Arkansas gubernatorial election
- 1876 Colorado gubernatorial election
- April 1876 Connecticut gubernatorial election
- November 1876 Connecticut gubernatorial election
- 1876 Florida gubernatorial election
- 1876 Georgia gubernatorial election
- 1876 Illinois gubernatorial election
- 1876 Indiana gubernatorial election
- 1876 Kansas gubernatorial election
- 1876 Louisiana gubernatorial election
- 1876 Maine gubernatorial election
- 1876 Massachusetts gubernatorial election
- 1876 Michigan gubernatorial election
- 1876 Missouri gubernatorial election
- 1876 Nebraska gubernatorial election
- 1876 New Hampshire gubernatorial election
- 1876 New York gubernatorial election
- 1876 North Carolina gubernatorial election
- 1876 Rhode Island gubernatorial election
- 1876 South Carolina gubernatorial election
- 1876 Texas gubernatorial election
- 1876 Vermont gubernatorial election
- 1876 West Virginia gubernatorial election

==== United States mayoral elections ====
- 1876 Boston mayoral election
- 1876 Chicago mayoral election
- 1876 Madison, Wisconsin mayoral election
- 1876 Manchester, New Hampshire mayoral election

== Oceania ==
- 1875–1876 New Zealand general election

== South America ==
- 1875–76 Colombian presidential election
- 1876 Chilean parliamentary election
- 1876 Chilean presidential election
- 1876 Peruvian presidential election

== See also ==
- Category:1876 elections
