= Ex parte Rodriguez =

1874 decision of the Supreme Court of Texas

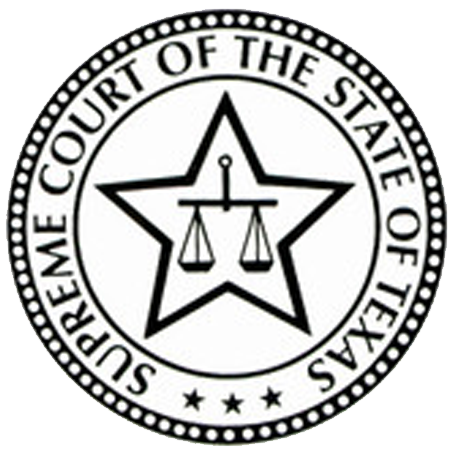
- Court: Supreme Court of Texas
- Decided: January 6, 1874
- Citation: 39 Tex. 705 (1874)

Court membership
- Judges sitting: Wesley Ogden, Moses B. Walker, John David McAdoo

Case opinions
- Decision by: Walker

Ex parte Rodriguez, 39 Tex. 705 (1874), also known as the Semicolon Case, was a decision of the Supreme Court of Texas. Had it been enforced, the Court's decision would have legally invalidated the 1873 Texas gubernatorial election as unconstitutional, based in part on its interpretation of a semicolon in the Constitution of Texas. The 1869 Texas Constitution provided that local, county, and state elections were to be held in the relevant county seat for four days, but also allowed the Legislature to create a new election law. Prior to the 1873 election, the Legislature provided for one election day to be held in local precincts. Richard Coke, a Democrat, won the 1873 gubernatorial election against the incumbent Governor of Texas, Edmund J. Davis, a Radical Republican. Shortly after the election, the Harris County Sheriff arrested a Mexican man named Joseph Rodriguez, allegedly for voting twice in the election. Rodriguez's attorneys, both prominent Republicans, challenged his arrest by a writ of habeas corpus in the Texas Supreme Court. The State, represented by the Harris and Travis County District Attorneys with support from several prominent Democratic members of the Texas bar and former judges, contended that Rodriguez had not violated the law and that his attorneys were colluding with allies of the outgoing Texas Governor Davis to void the election. The Court heard the case, and, relying in part on the placement of a semicolon in the Constitution, held that the election law was unconstitutional, effectively voiding the election. Coke and his allies ignored the decision, seizing power from Davis. Legal commentators have split on the soundness of the Court's legal reasoning.

== Background ==
In 1867, Texas was placed under military control as part of the Fifth Military District under congressional Reconstruction. Following a contentious constitutional convention in 1868, a new Constitution of Texas came into effect in 1869. Article III, section 6 of the 1869 Constitution provided that state, district, and county elections were to be held at the appropriate county seats and that polls would be opened for four days from 8:00 a.m. to 4:00 p.m. The provision stated, in full:

All elections for State, district and county officers shall be held at the county seats of the several counties, until otherwise provided by law; and the polls shall be opened for four days, from eight o'clock A. M. until four o'clock P. M. of each day.

Edmund J. Davis, a Radical Republican, was elected governor of Texas in 1869, beginning his term in 1870. In March 1873, the Texas Legislature enacted a law providing for all elections to be held at local precincts, rather than the county seat, "for one day only" from 8:00 a.m. to 6:00 p.m. On December 2, 1873, Davis lost the election to the Democratic candidate, Richard Coke. Davis appealed to President Ulysses S. Grant for military assistance, arguing in part that the limitation of the election to one day was unconstitutional under the Texas Constitution; Grant rejected Davis's request, writing in a telegram that Davis himself had approved the legislation and that it would be unwise to reject the voters' will.

== Habeas proceedings ==
Shortly after the election, Harris County Sheriff A. B. Hall arrested a Mexican man named Joseph Rodriguez, based on allegations that he had voted twice in the election. Through his attorneys—the former Republican Governor of Texas Andrew Jackson Hamilton and Chauncey Brewer Sabin—Rodriguez sought a writ of habeas corpus from the Texas Supreme Court, alleging that his arrest was unlawful because the legislature had unconstitutionally limited the election to a single day. On December 16, 1873, Presiding Judge Wesley Ogden issued a writ, directing Sheriff Hall to bring Rodriguez before the Court in Austin.

The State of Texas was initially represented by the Harris County District Attorney, who with the Court's permission had the support of a committee of prominent Democratic and former Confederate attorneys, including former Texas Supreme Court Chief Justice George F. Moore, Alexander W. Terrell, Charles S. West, and William M. Walton. The State moved to dismiss the case, alleging that the Sheriff had hired Rodriguez and faked the charges and his arrest for the purposes of seeking immediate review of the constitutionality of the election law from the Supreme Court. Some of the prominent Democratic attorneys threatened the judges with impeachment. The Court, in a preliminary decision by Judge John David McAdoo, denied the motion to dismiss. The Harris County District Attorney then resigned, stating that he had no evidence upon which to proceed with a criminal case against Rodriguez; the Court appointed the Travis County District Attorney to represent the State in his place.

The Court then proceeded to trial on the matter. Rodriguez and his attorneys sought to prove that there was probable cause to believe that he was guilty of the crime of voting twice, while the State and its allies argued that Rodriguez had not voted twice and that the case was a sham, causing Judge McAdoo to call the case "a curious one". In their opening and closing arguments, the State maintained that the writ should be denied because the case was a sham, and further argued that the case should be remanded to the Harris County court, that the Court should not use a habeas trial to decide a constitutional question, and that the validity of the election of coordinate branches of government was a political question that the Court lacked authority to adjudicate. Hamilton argued that there was probable cause to believe that Rodriguez had voted twice, but that his arrest was unlawful because the election law itself was invalid under the Constitution, which provided that the Legislature could change only the place of elections. In response to the State, he argued that the court had merely been called upon to decide whether the electoral process, rather than the election, was valid.

== Decision ==
After again dismissing the State's jurisdictional arguments, the Texas Supreme Court in a unanimous decision by Judge Moses B. Walker held that the Legislature had violated the Constitution when it limited elections to a single day and granted the writ. The Court relied, in part, on the placement of the semicolon in article III, section 6 of the Constitution, concluding that the phrase "until otherwise provided by law" only allowed the Legislature to change the location, but not the length, of elections.

== Aftermath ==
The Court's decision, which would have had the effect of invalidating the 1873 election, was never enforced. In early January 1874, Coke and his supporters gained access to the governor's offices on the second floor of the Capitol. The military unit organized to protect Davis instead supported Coke. Coke was inaugurated on January 15. Davis again sought President Grant's assistance, was again rejected, and resigned on January 19. Coke fired the members of the Supreme Court and selected five new justices to serve on the Court under a constitutional amendment that had passed in the recent election. As a result of the case, the Supreme Court under the 1869 Constitution came to be known as the "Semicolon Court".

== Analysis ==
Vasan Kesavan, an attorney, and the legal scholar Michael Stokes Paulsen concluded that the Court correctly interpreted the constitutional provision, and that the results of that interpretation were not so absurd or unjust to warrant looking past the Constitution's plain text. By contrast, the Texas Supreme Court Justice James R. Norvell and the lawyer George E. Shelley argued that the Constitution provided for four days to vote only because elections were to be held in the county seat; by changing the location of voting to local precincts, it was absurd to provide voters with four days to go to the polls.

== Sources ==
- Bishop, Curtis (2017) [first published 1952]. "The Election of 1873: Richard Coke vs. Edmund J. Davis". Handbook of Texas. Austin, Tex.: Texas State Historical Association. Archived from the original on July 12, 2025.
- Kesavan, Vasan; Paulsen, Michael Stokes (March 2002). "Is West Virginia Unconstitutional?" (PDF). Articles. California Law Review. 90 (2): 291–400. doi:10.15779/Z384B06. Archived (PDF) from the original on August 28, 2024 – via UC Berkeley Law Library Catalog.
- Moneyhon, Carl H. (1995) [first published 1976]. "The Semicolon Court: Texas Supreme Court's Controversial Legacy (1870–1873)". Handbook of Texas. Austin, Tex.: Texas State Historical Association. Archived from the original on July 18, 2025.
- Moneyhon, Carl H. (2019) [first published 1995]. "Ex parte Rodriguez: The Semicolon Case and Its Impact on Texas Politics". Handbook of Texas. Austin, Tex.: Texas State Historical Association. Archived from the original on July 12, 2025.
- Norvell, James R. (February 1959). "Oran M. Roberts and the Semicolon Court". Texas Law Review. 37 (3): 279–302 – via HeinOnline.
- Shelley, George E. (April 1945). "The Semicolon Court of Texas". The Southwestern Historical Quarterly. 48 (4): 449–468. JSTOR 30239708.
