= 1876 Texas lieutenant gubernatorial election =

- February 15, 1876
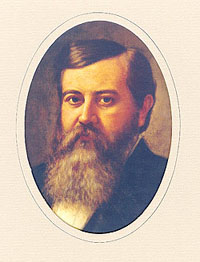

Nominee	Richard B. Hubbard	F. W. Miner
Party	Democratic	Republican
Popular vote	150,418	48,638
Percentage	75.57%	24.43%
Lieutenant Governor before election
Richard B. Hubbard
Democratic
Elected Lieutenant Governor
Richard B. Hubbard
Democratic

The 1876 Texas lieutenant gubernatorial election was held on February 15, 1876, in order to elect the lieutenant governor of Texas. Democratic candidate and incumbent Richard B. Hubbard was reelected defeating Republican candidate F. W. Miner by a wide margin.

== General election ==
The election took place simultaneously with the vote to ratify a newly drafted state constitution that had been championed by incumbent governor Richard Coke. The new constitution was an effort by Redeemer politicians who sought to undo the changes brought about by the Radical Republicans and Reconstruction through the Constitution of 1869 and was the major issue of the campaign.

=== Candidates ===
- Richard B. Hubbard, incumbent (Democrat)
- Colonel F. W. Miner, civil war veteran (Republican)

=== Results ===
Texas lieutenant gubernatorial election, 1876
Party	Candidate	Votes	%	±%
Democratic	Richard B. Hubbard (incumbent)	150,418	75.57	▲8.61
Republican	F. W. Miner	48,638	24.43	▼8.59
Total votes		199,056	100.00	
Democratic hold				

== Aftermath ==
The ratification of a new constitution, coupled with the election of Democrats statewide established a new political system in the state, helping the Democratic party became the dominant political party for approximately 100 years.

The new constitution changed the term length of the governor and lieutenant governor from four years to two, reverting it to the term length that existed prior to the Civil War.

Within the year, Governor Coke, having succeeded in his core campaign issue, resigned the governorship in order to be elected to the United States Senate. Hubbard would ascend to the office of governor in December 1876, leaving the office vacant until the next election.
