= Martyrology =

Listing of martyrs in the Catholic Church

A martyrology is a catalogue or list of martyrs and other saints and beati arranged in the calendar order of their anniversaries or feasts. Local martyrologies record exclusively the custom of a particular Church. Local lists were enriched by names borrowed from neighbouring churches. Consolidation occurred, by the combination of several local martyrologies, with or without borrowings from literary sources.

This is the now accepted meaning in the Latin Church. In the Eastern Orthodox Church, the nearest equivalent to the martyrology are the Synaxaria and the longer Menaia, both sometimes known as Menologia. (Note: The Greek synaxaries are a counterpart. The literature of the synaxaries comprises also the books of that category belonging to the various Oriental rites (see Analecta Bollandiana, XIV, 396 sqq.; Hippolyte Delehaye, Synaxarium ecclesiæ Constantinopolitanæ Propylæum ad Acta Sanctorum novembris, 1902).)

Simple martyrologies only enumerate names. Historical martyrologies, also sometimes called passionaries, also include stories or biographical details.

== Oldest examples ==
The martyrology, or ferial, of the Roman Church in the middle of the fourth century still exists. It comprises two distinct lists, the Depositio martyrum and the Depositio episcoporum, lists most frequently found united.

Among the Roman martyrs, mention is already made in the Ferial of African martyrs, namely, Perpetua and Felicity (March 7) and also Cyprian (September 14). The calendar of Carthage, which belongs to the sixth century, contains a larger portion of foreign martyrs and even of confessors not belonging to that region of the Church.

== The Martyrologium Hieronymianum ==
The most influential of the local martyrologies is the martyrology commonly called Hieronymian, because it is (pseudepigraphically) attributed to Jerome. It was presumably drawn up in Italy in the second half of the fifth century, and underwent recension in Gaul, probably at Auxerre, in the late sixth. All known manuscripts of the text spring from this Gallican recension.

Setting aside the additions it later received, the chief sources of the Hieronymian are a general martyrology of the Churches of the East, the local martyrology of the Church of Rome, a general martyrology of Italy, a general martyrology of Africa, and some literary sources, among them Eusebius.

Victor De Buck ("Acta SS.", Octobris, XII, 185, and elsewhere) identified the relationship of the Hieronymian Martyrology to the Syriac Martyrology discovered by Wright. This is of assistance in recognizing the existence of a general martyrology of the East, written in Greek at Nicomedia, and which served as a source for the Hieronymian.

This document is in poor condition. Proper names are distorted, repeated or misplaced, and in many places the text is so corrupt that it is impossible to understand it. With the exception of a few traces of borrowings from the Passions of the martyrs, the compilation is in the form of a simple martyrology.

There were three manuscript versions: those of Bern, Wolfenbuttel. and Echternach. The latter is thought to be the earliest, based on a copy possibly brought to England by Augustine of Canterbury in 597, and preserved in a manuscript at the Abbey of Echternach, founded by the English missionary Willibrord.

The Martyrologium Hieronymianum Epternacense, now in the Bibliothèque Nationale in Paris, is thought to have been written in the early eighth century as an Insular version of the "Hieronymianum", compiled from two separate copies. In some instances the feast is misplaced by a day. Also known as the Echternach recension, it was adapted to the English Church, incorporating memorials for Augustine of Canterbury, Paulinus of York and others.

In 1885 De Rossi and Duchesne published a memoir entitled Les sources du martyrologe hiéronymien (in Mélanges d'archéologie et d'histoire, V), which became the starting-point of a critical edition of the martyrology, published through their efforts in Vol. II for November of the "Acta SS." in 1894.

The medievalist Henri Quentin and Bollandist Hippolyte Delehaye collaborated on an annotated edition, Commentarius Perpetuus in Martyrologium Hieronymianum, (Brussels, in 1931); Quentin supplied the textual commentary and Delehaye the historical.

== Historical martyrologies ==
There is another type of martyrology in which the name is followed by a short history of the saint. These are the historical martyrologies. There exists a large number of them, from the ninth century. It may be said that their chief sources are, besides the Hieronymian, accounts derived from the Acts of the martyrs and some ecclesiastical authors.

Of the best-known historical martyrologies, the oldest go under the names of:

- Bede (eighth century)
- Florus of Lyon
- Wandelbert, a monk of Prüm (842)
- Rhabanus Maurus (c. 845)
- Ado of Vienne (d. 875)
- Notker the Stammerer (896)
- Wolfhard
- Tallaght
- Oengus

The most famous of all is that of Usuard (c. 875), Martyrology of Usuard, on which the Roman martyrology was based.

The first edition of the Roman martyrology appeared at Rome in 1583. The third edition, which appeared in 1584, was approved by Gregory XIII, who gave the Roman martyrology official status for the whole Church. In 1586, Baronius published his annotated edition, which in spite of its omissions and inaccuracies is a mine of valuable information.

The historical martyrologies, taken as a whole, have been studied by Quentin (1908). There are also numerous editions of calendars or martyrologies of less universal interest, and commentaries upon them. Mention ought to be made of the famous marble calendar of Naples.

== Scholarship ==
The critical study of martyrologies is rendered difficult by the multitude and the disparate character of the elements that compose them. Early researches dealt with the historical martyrologies.

The chief works on the martyrologies are those of Heribert Rosweyde, who in 1613 published at Antwerp the martyrology of Ado; of Sollerius, who produced a learned edition of Usuard; and of Fiorentini, who published in 1688 an annotated edition of the Martyrology of St Jerome. The critical edition of the latter by J. B. de Rossi and Louis Duchesne, was published in 1894.

The notes of Baronius on the Roman Martyrology cannot be passed over in silence, the work having done much towards making known the historical sources of the compilations of the Middle Ages. In Vol. II for March of the "Acta Sanctorum" (1668) the Bollandists furnished new materials for martyrological criticism by their publication entitled Martyrologium venerabilis Bedæ presbyteri ex octo antiquis manuscriptis acceptum cum auctario Flori …. The results then achieved were in part corrected, in part rendered more specific, by the great work of Jean Baptiste du Sollier, Martyrologium Usuardi monachi (Antwerp, 1714), published in parts in Vols. VI and VII for June of the "Acta Sanctorum."

Although Du Sollier's text of Usuard is not beyond criticism, the edition surpasses anything of the kind previously attempted. Henri Quentin (Les Martyrologes historiques du moyen âge, Paris, 1908) took up the general question and succeeded in giving a reasonable solution, thanks to careful study of the manuscripts.

== Documents ==
As regards documents, the most important distinction is between local and general martyrologies. The former give a list of the festivals of some particular Church; the latter are the result of a combination of several local martyrologies. Certain compilations of a factitious character are also called martyrologies, e.g. the Martyrologe universel of Chatelain (1709).

Examples of local martyrologies include:

- that of Rome, formed from the Depositio martyrum and the Depositio episcoporum of the chronograph of 354
- the Gothic calendar of Ulfila`s Bible
- the calendar of Carthage published by Jean Mabillon
- the calendar of fasts and vigils of the Church of Tours, going back as far as Bishop Perpetuus (d. 490), and preserved in the Historia Francorum (xi. 31) of Gregory of Tours

The Syriac martyrology discovered by Wright (Journal of Sacred Literature, 1866) gives the idea of a general martyrology.

Prior to Vatican II, the Martyrology was read publicly as part of the Roman Catholic Divine Office at Prime. It was always anticipated, that is, the reading for the following day was read. By decree of Vatican II, the office of Prime was suppressed. A fully revised edition the Roman Martyrology was issued in 2001, with rubrics which allow the Martyrology to be proclaimed at the end of the celebration of Lauds or of one of the Little Hours, or apart from liturgical celebrations in community gatherings for meetings or meals.

== Roman Martyrology ==
The model of the Roman Martyrology is directly derived from the historical martyrologies. It is in sum the Martyrology of Usuard, which was also still the title of an incunabula edition for use in Rome, completed by the "Dialogues" of Pope Gregory I and the works of some of the Church Fathers, and for the Greek saints by the catalogue known as the Menologion of Sirlet. The editio princeps appeared at Rome in 1583, under the title: Martyrologium romanum ad novam kalendarii rationem et ecclesiasticæ historiæ veritatem restitutum, Gregorii XIII pont. max. iussu editum. It bears no approbation. A second edition also appeared at Rome in the same year. This was soon replaced by the edition of 1584, which was promulgated as official for the entire Roman rite of the Church by Pope Gregory XIII. Baronius revised and corrected this work and republished it in 1586, with the Notationes and the Tractatio de Martyrologio Romano. The Antwerp edition of 1589 was corrected in some places by Baronius himself. A new edition of the text and the notes took place under Pope Urban VIII and was published in 1630. Pope Benedict XIV was also interested in the Roman Martyrology: his Bull of 1748 addressed to John V, King of Portugal, was often included as a preface in printed copies of the Roman Martyrology.

After the Second Vatican Council, a fully revised edition was promulgated in 2001, followed in 2005 by a version (bearing the publication date of 2004) that adjusted a number of typographical errors that appeared in the 2001 edition and added 117 saints and blesseds canonized or beatified between 2001 and 2004, as well as a number of more ancient saints not included in the previous edition. "The updated Martyrology contains 7,000 saints and blesseds currently venerated by the Church, and whose cult is officially recognized and proposed to the faithful as models worthy of imitation."

== Further comments ==
- There is a list drawn up at the beginning of Vol. I for November of the Acta Sanctorum.
- Among the compilations given the title of martyrologies are the Martyrologium Gallicanum of André du Saussay (Paris, 1637), the Catalogus Sanctorum Italiæ of Filippo Ferrari (Milan, 1613), the Martyrologium Hispanum of Tamayo (Lyon, 1651–1659) (consulted with caution). The universal martyrology of Chastelain (Paris, 1709) represents vast researches.

== See also ==
- Hagiography
- Foxe's Book of Martyrs (1563), by John Foxe
- Martyrs Mirror (1660), by Thieleman J. van Braght
- List of saints
