= Joseph Rodriguez =

Joseph Rodriguez may refer to:

- Joseph Rodriguez (photographer), American documentary photographer
- Joseph C. Rodríguez (1928–2005), United States Army soldier and Medal of Honor recipient
- Joseph H. Rodriguez (born 1930), United States federal judge
- Joseph Rodriguez, a party in the Texas Supreme Court case Ex parte Rodriguez (1874)
