= Carl Moneyhon =

American historian and professor

Carl H. Moneyhon is an American historian and professor. He received his PhD from University of Chicago in 1973 with a thesis "The Republican Party and Texas politics 1865–1874".

He works at the University of Arkansas in Little Rock and has published numerous papers and books. The Arkansas Democrat-Gazette described him as a Civil War expert.

Moneyhon has written entries for the Texas State Historical Association and received a fellowship from it.

== Writings ==
- Republicanism in Reconstruction Texas. Texas A&M University Press. (1979)
- The Impact of Civil War and Reconstruction on Arkansas: Persistence in the Midst of Ruin University of Arkansas Press (1994)
- Arkansas and the New South 1874–1929 The University of Arkansas Press, Fayetteville (1997)
- Texas after the Civil War : the struggle of Reconstruction Texas A & M University Press (2004)
- Edmund J. Davis of Texas : Civil War general, Republican leader, Reconstruction governor. Texas Christian University (2010)
- A photographic history of Louisiana in the Civil War with Bobby Leon Roberts. University of Arkansas Press (1990)
- A Photographic History of Ariansas in the Civil War with Bobby Leon Roverts. University of Arkansas Press (1998)
- A Photographic History of Texas in the Civil War with Bobby Leon Roberts. University of Arkansas Press
- George T. Ruby: Champion of Equal Rights in Reconstruction Texas, Fort Worth Center for Texas Studies and TCU Press (2020)
- The Union League and Biracial Politics in Reconstruction Texas. Texas A&M University Press (2021)

=== Papers ===
1. "Black Politics in Arkansas during the Gilded Age 1876 - 1900"

He also wrote a number of biographical entries for the American National Biography Online.
