= Jules Degeetere =

Belgian cyclist

Personal information
- Full name: Jules Degeetere
- Born: 7 April 1876 Rumbeke, Belgium
- Died: 10 February 1957 (aged 80) Saint-Gilles, Belgium

Cycling career
- Sport: Cycling
- Role: Rider

Jules Degeetere (7 April 1876 – 10 February 1957) was a Belgian racing cyclist. He won the Belgian national road race title in 1899.
