= 1876 Missouri lieutenant gubernatorial election =

- November 7, 1876
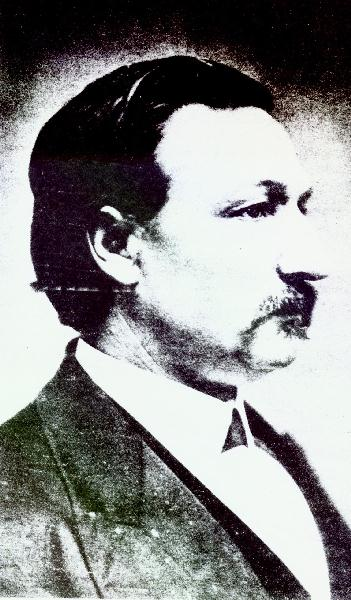

Nominee	Henry Clay Brockmeyer	Charles C. Allen
Party	Democratic	Republican
Popular vote	202,109	145,958
Percentage	58.07%	41.93%
Lieutenant Governor before election
Norman Jay Colman
Democratic
Elected Lieutenant Governor
Henry Clay Brockmeyer
Democratic

The 1876 Missouri lieutenant gubernatorial election was held on November 7, 1876, in order to elect the lieutenant governor of Missouri. Democratic nominee Henry Clay Brockmeyer defeated Republican nominee Charles C. Allen.

== General election ==
On election day, November 7, 1876, Democratic nominee Henry Clay Brockmeyer won the election by a margin of 56,151 votes against his opponent Republican nominee Charles C. Allen, thereby retaining Democratic control over the office of lieutenant governor. Brockmeyer was sworn in as the 18th lieutenant governor of Missouri on January 8, 1877.

=== Results ===
Missouri lieutenant gubernatorial election, 1876
Party	Candidate	Votes	%
Democratic	Henry Clay Brockmeyer	202,109	58.07
Republican	Charles C. Allen	145,958	41.93
Total votes		348,067	100.00
Democratic hold			

== See also ==
- 1876 Missouri gubernatorial election
