= 1876 Belgian general election =

- 13 June 1876

63 of the 124 seats in the Chamber of Representatives 63 seats needed for a majority
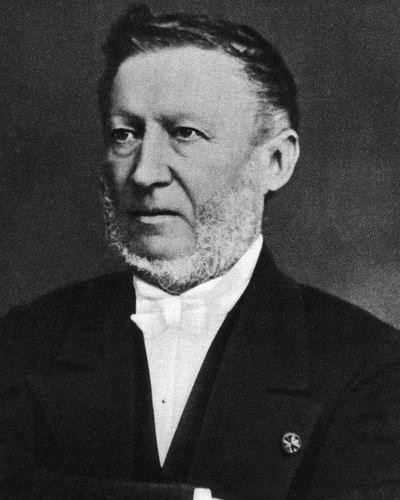

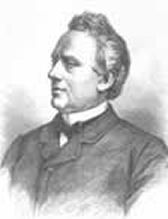
	First party	Second party
Leader	Jules Malou	Walthère Frère-Orban
Party	Catholic	Liberal
Leader since	Candidate for PM	Candidate for PM
Seats before	68 seats	56 seats
Seats won	42	21
Seats after	67	57
Seat change	▼1	▲1
Popular vote	22,952	19,788
Percentage	53.70%	46.30%
Government before election
Malou I
Catholic
Government after election
Malou I
Catholic

Partial general elections were held in Belgium on 13 June 1876. In the elections for the Chamber of Representatives the result was a victory for the Catholic Party, which won 67 of the 124 seats. Voter turnout was 67.5%, although only 63,278 people were eligible to vote.

Under the alternating system, elections were only held in five out of the nine provinces: Antwerp, Brabant, Luxembourg, Namur and West Flanders.

Additionally, special elections were held:

- Simultaneously with the partial general elections to elect a representative for the arrondissement of Liège
- On 7 August 1876 to elect a representative for the arrondissement of Leuven following the death of Edouard Wouters on 13 July 1876
- On 7 September 1876 to elect a representative for the arrondissement of Virton replacing Albert de Briey

== Results ==
=== Chamber of Representatives ===
Party	Votes	%	Seats		
Party	Votes	%	Won	Total	+/–
Catholic Party	22,952	53.70	42	67	–1
Liberal Party	19,788	46.30	21	57	+1
Total	42,740	100.00	63	124	0
Total votes	42,740	–			
Registered voters/turnout	63,278	67.54			
Source: Mackie & Rose, Sternberger et al.
