= Victor de Buck =

Belgian Jesuit priest and theologian

Victor de Buck ( de "book"), (21 April 1817, Oudenaarde, Belgium – 23 May 1876, Brussels) was a Belgian Jesuit priest and theologian. He is credited with relaunching the work of the Bollandists in the 19th century, after the restoration of the Society of Jesus.

== Life ==
His family was one of the most distinguished in the city of Oudenaarde (Audenarde). After a course in the humanities, begun at the College of Soignies and the petit seminaire of Roeselare and completed in 1835 at the college of the Society of Jesus at Aalst, he entered the Society of Jesus on 11 October 1835. After two years in the novitiate, then at Nivelles, and a year at Tronchiennes reviewing and finishing his literary studies, he went to Namur in September 1838 to study philosophy and the natural sciences. De Buck wrote with ease in Flemish, French, and Latin.

The work of the Bollandists had just been revived and, in spite of his youth, Victor de Buck was summoned to act as assistant to the hagiographers. He remained at this work in Brussels from September 1840, to September 1845. After devoting four years to theological studies at Louvain where he was ordained priest in 1848, and making his third year of probation in the Society of Jesus, he was permanently assigned to the Bollandist work in 1850. He remained engaged in it until his death, living in a room at St. Michael's College, Brussels, which also served as his study. He had already published in Vol. VII of the October Acta Sanctorum, which appeared in 1845, sixteen commentaries or notices that are easily distinguishable because they are without a signature, unlike those written by the Bollandists. In the early years, he would periodically take a brief respite to preach a country mission in Flemish.

In collaboration with scholastic Antoine Tinnebroek, he composed a response to a book published by the professor of canon law at the University of Leuven which argued against various rights of the regular clergy. This response, which fills an octavo volume of 640 pages, was ready for publication within four months. It was to have been supplemented by a second volume that was almost completed but could not be published because of the political disturbances of the year, the prelude to the revolutions of 1848. The work was never resumed.

Besides the numerous commentaries in Vols. IX, X, XI, XII, and XIII of the October Acta Sanctorum, de Buck published in Latin, French and Dutch a large number of little works of piety and dissertations on devotion to the saints, church history, and Christian archaeology. The partial enumeration of these works fills two folio columns of his eulogy, in the forepart of vol. II of the November Acta. In 1862 he published a Latin dissertation, De solemnitate praecipue paupertatis religiosae, in the form of a letter to his brother Remi. Remi, then professor of church history at the theological college of Louvain, subsequently collaborated with de Buck on his Bollandist work.

In 1863 and 1864, de Buck published two treatises in French, one under the title Solution amiable de la question des couvents and the other De l'état religieux, treating of the religious life in Belgium in the nineteenth century.

De Buck was part of an international scholarly community, researching, studying, and sharing citations with colleagues. He maintained a frequent correspondence with Agostino Morini.

== Relics controversy ==
In order to satisfy the many requests made to Rome by churches and religious communities for relics of saints, it had become customary to take from the catacombs of Rome the bodies of unknown personages believed to have been honored as martyrs in the early church. The sign by which they were to be recognized was a glass vial sealed up in the plaster outside the loculus that contained the body, and bearing traces of a red substance that had been enclosed and was supposed to have been blood. Doubts had arisen as to the correctness of this interpretation and, after careful study, Victor de Buck felt convinced that it was false and that what had been taken for blood was probably the sediment of consecrated wine. The conclusion, together with its premises, was set forth in a dissertation published in 1855 under the title De phialis rubricatis quibus martyrum romanorum sepulcra dignosci dicuntur. Naturally it raised lively protestations, particularly on the part of those who were responsible for distributing the relics of the saints, the more so, as the cardinal vicar of Rome in 1861 strictly forbade any further transportation of these relics.

De Buck had only a few copies of his work printed, these being intended for the cardinals and prelates particularly interested in the question. As none were put on the market, it was rumored that de Buck's superiors had suppressed the publication of the book and that all the copies printed, save five or six, had been destroyed. This was untrue; no copy had been destroyed and his superiors had laid no blame upon the author. Then, in 1863, a decree was obtained from the Congregation of Rites, renewing an older decree, whereby it was declared that a vial of blood placed outside of a sepulchral niche in the catacombs was an unmistakable sign by which the tomb of a martyr might be known, and it was proclaimed that Victor de Buck's opinion was formally disapproved and condemned by Rome. This too was false, as de Buck had never intimated that the placing of the vial of blood did not indicate the resting-place of a martyr, when it could be proved that the vial contained genuine blood, such as was supposed by the decree of the congregation.

Finally, there appeared in Paris a large quarto volume written by the Roman prelate, Archangeli Sconamiglio, Reliquiarum custode. It was filled with caustic criticisms of the author of De phialis rubricatis and relegated him to the rank of notorious heretics who had combated devotion to the saints and the veneration of their relics. In response, de Buck published a protest, in which he argued that neither the decree of 1863 nor any other decision emanating from ecclesiastical authority had affected his thesis.

== Ecumenism ==
Opinions were attributed to de Buck which, if not formally heretical, at least openly defied ideas generally accepted by Catholics. What apparently gave rise to these accusations were the amicable relations established, principally through correspondence, between Victor de Buck and such men as the celebrated Edward Pusey in England, and Montalembert, in France. Through contacts with foreign hagiographers and the English Jesuits in Louvain, de Buck developed an interest in a possible reunification of the churches. During the 1850s he expressed this interest in a number of publications, including the Études Religieuses and The Rambler. De Buck's opinion regarding the views of Pusey were closer to those of Newman than Henry Edward Manning.

A shared interest in the lives of the saints brought him in contact with Alexander Forbes, the Anglican bishop, with whom he corresponded at length. De Buck was also a friend of Bishop Félix Dupanloup. These relations were brought about by the reputation for deep learning, integrity, and scientific independence that de Buck's works had earned for him, by his readiness to oblige those who addressed questions to him, and by his earnestness and skill in elucidating the most difficult questions. Grave and direct accusations were made against de Buck and reported to the Pope.

In a Latin letter addressed to Cardinal Patrizzi, and intended to come to the notice of the Pope, de Buck protested the accusations, supported by the testimony of four of his principal superiors, former provincials, and rectors. With the consent of his superiors he published this letter in order to communicate with those of his friends who might have been disturbed by these accusations.

De Buck had hoped for an Anglican presence at the First Vatican Council as a step toward rapprochement, but doctrinal differences proved an impediment; the doctrine of infallibility.

Peter Jan Beckx, Father General of the Society, summoned him to Rome to act as official theologian at the First Vatican Council. On his return, de Buck showed the first symptoms of arteriosclerosis, which finally ended his life. Toward the end of his life, de Buck lost his sight, but dictated from memory, material previously compiled regarding saints of the early Celtic Church in Ireland, to his brother Remi.

== Works ==
- De phialis rubricatis quibus martyrum romanorum sepulcra dignosci dicuntur (1855)
- Les Saints Martyrs Japonais de La Compagnie de Jesus Paul Miki, Jean Soan de Gotto Et Jacques Kisai (1863)
- Le Gesù de Rome: Notice Descriptive et Historique (1871)
