= 1876 Texas gubernatorial election =

- February 15, 1876
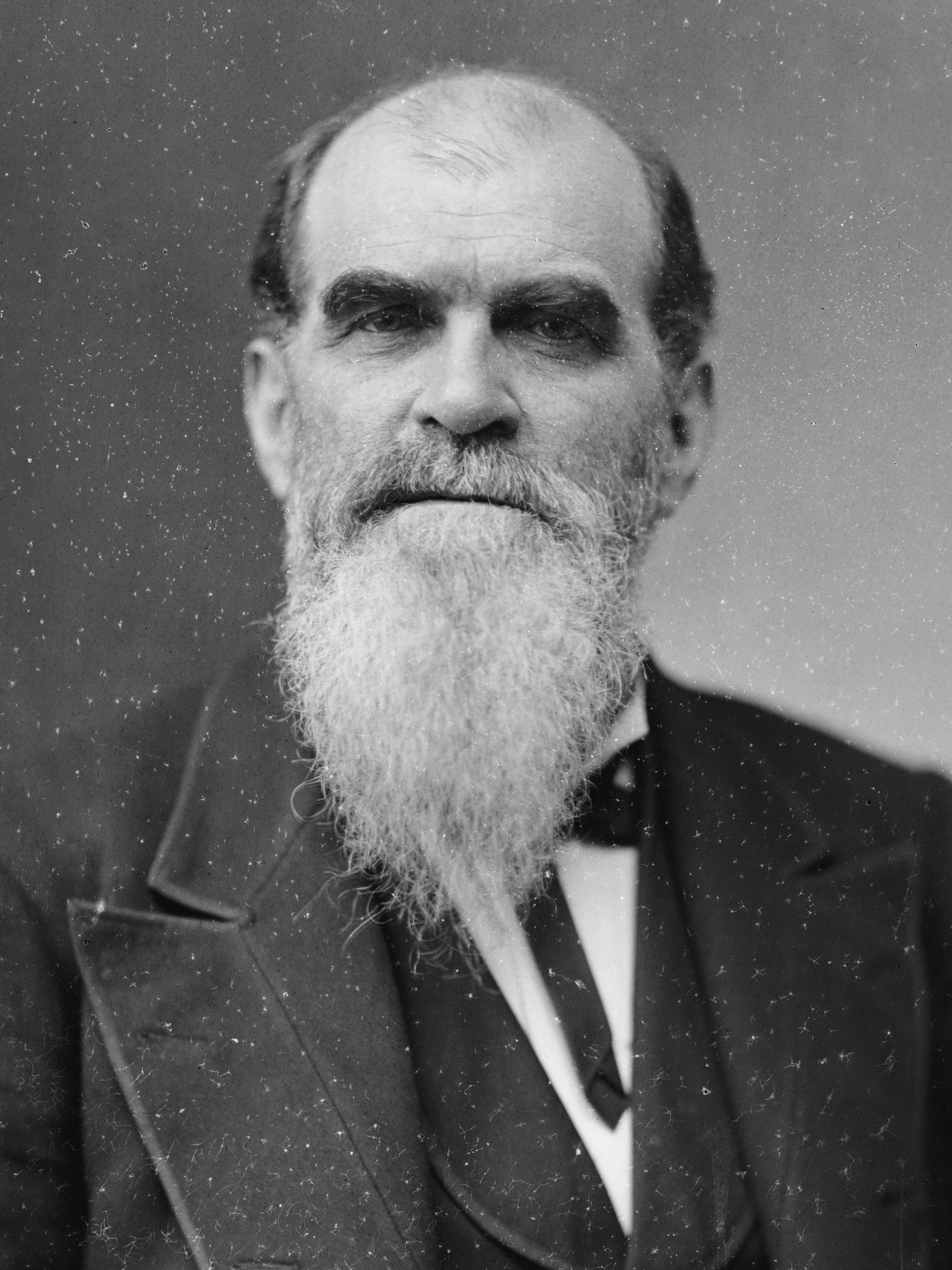

Candidate	Richard Coke	William Chambers
Party	Democratic	Republican
Popular vote	150,581	50,030
Percentage	75.06%	24.94%
- County results Coke: 50–60% 60–70% 70–80% 80–90% 90–100% Chambers: 50–60% 60–70% 70–80% 80–90% No Data/Vote
Governor before election
Richard Coke
Democratic
Governor-elect
Richard Coke
Democratic

The 1876 Texas gubernatorial election was held to elect the Governor of Texas. Incumbent Governor Richard Coke was elected to a second term in office over William Chambers, a judge of the First Judicial District. The election took place simultaneously with the vote to ratify a newly drafted state constitution that Coke had championed.

== General election ==
=== Candidates ===
- Richard Coke, incumbent Governor, former associate justice of the Texas Supreme Court (Democratic)
- William Chambers, judge of the First Judicial District (Republican)

=== Results ===
1876 Texas gubernatorial election
Party	Candidate	Votes	%
Democratic	Richard Coke (incumbent)	150,581	75.06%
Republican	William Chambers	50,030	24.94%
Total votes		200,611	100.00%

== Aftermath ==
The new constitution was ratified by a vote of 136,606 to 56,652. coupled with the election of Democrats statewide established a new political system in the state, helping the Democratic party became the dominant political party for approximately 100 years.

The new constitution reversed many of the changes that had been brought about through Reconstruction. Among these changes was the shortening of the term length of the governor and lieutenant governor from four years to two, reverting it to the term length that existed prior to the Civil War.

In December 1876, Governor Coke, having succeeded in his core campaign issue, resigned the governorship in order to take a seat in the United States Senate.
