= Richard Coke =

Governor of Texas from 1874 to 1876

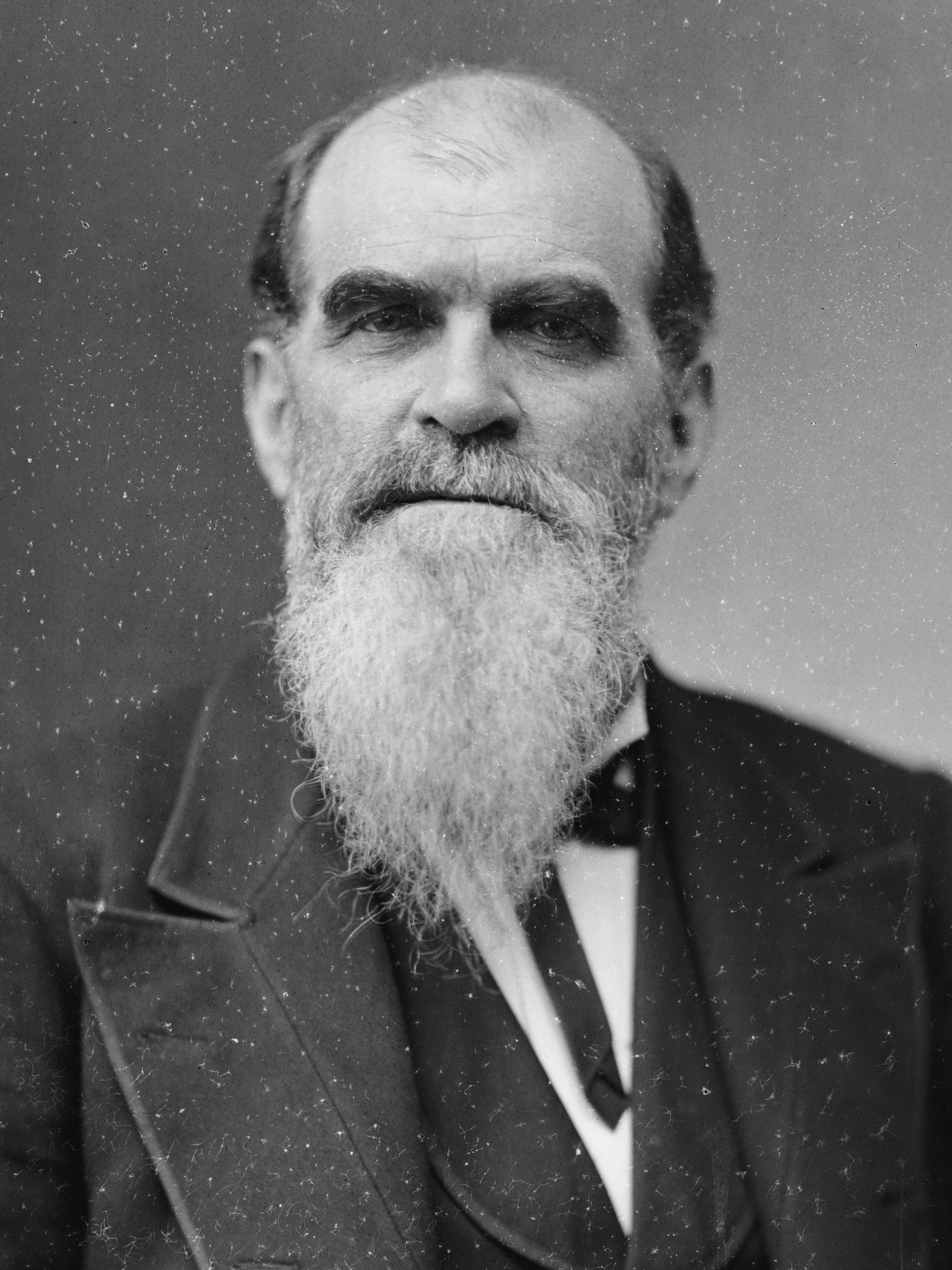

United States Senator from Texas
- In office March 4, 1877 – March 3, 1895
- Preceded by: Morgan C. Hamilton
- Succeeded by: Horace Chilton

15th Governor of Texas
- In office January 15, 1874 – December 1, 1876
- Lieutenant: Vacant
- Preceded by: Edmund J. Davis
- Succeeded by: Richard B. Hubbard

Personal details
- Born: March 18, 1829 Williamsburg, Virginia, U.S.
- Died: May 14, 1897 (aged 68) Waco, Texas, U.S.
- Party: Democratic
- Education: College of William & Mary (LLB)

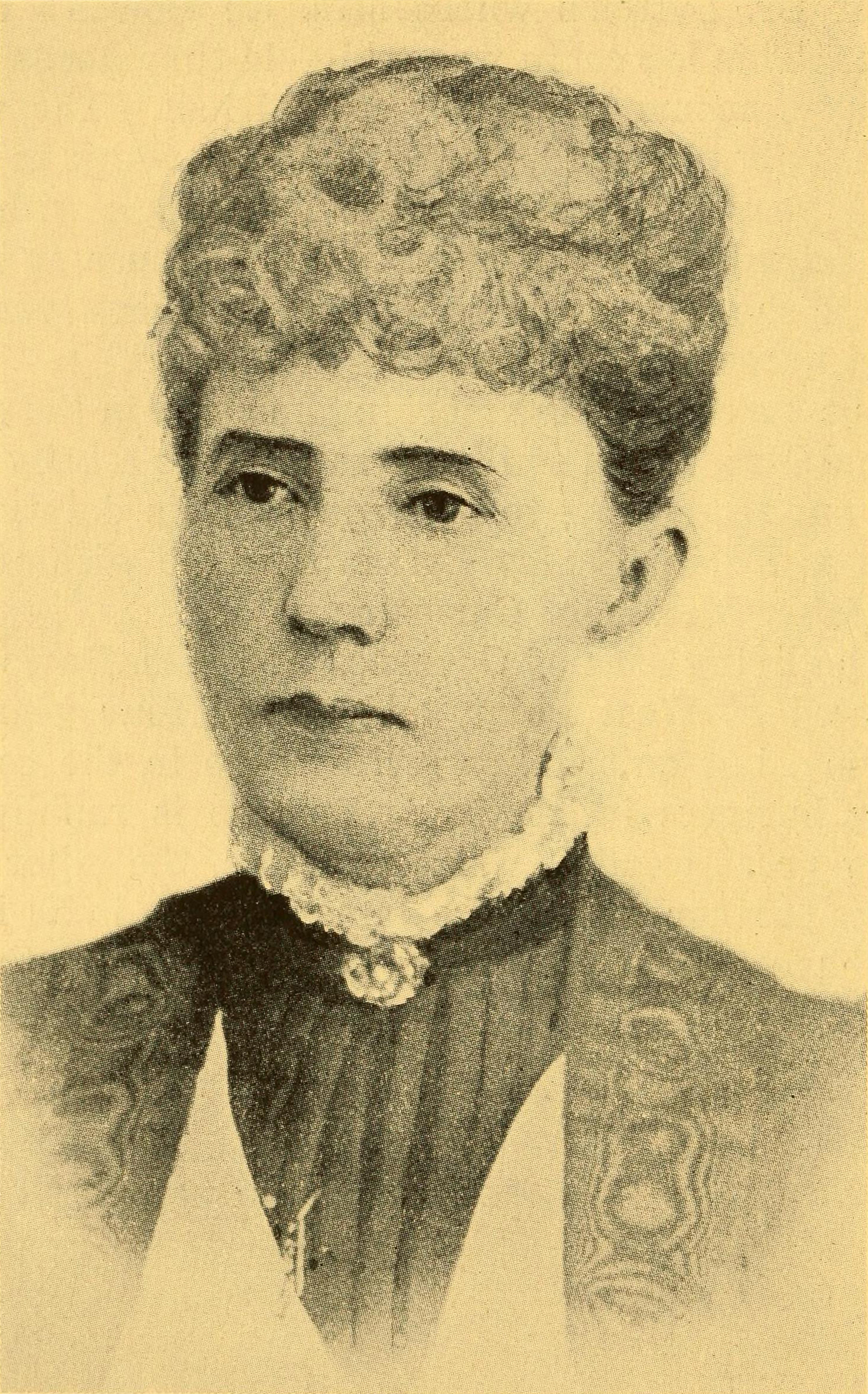
Mary Horne Coke

Richard Coke (March 18, 1829 – May 14, 1897) was an American lawyer and politician. He was the 15th governor of Texas from 1874 to 1876 and was a US Senator from 1877 to 1895. His governorship is notable for reestablishing local white supremacist rule in Texas, and the disfranchisement of African American voters, following Reconstruction. Richard Coke was revered by many Texas Southern Democrats due to his perceived triumphs over Reconstruction era Federal control in Texas politics. He was a part of the Redeemers movement in Southern US politics. His uncle was US Representative Richard Coke Jr.

== Early life and education ==
Richard Coke was born in 1829 in Williamsburg, Virginia, to John and Eliza (Hankins) Coke. Octavius Coke was his brother. He graduated from the College of William and Mary in 1848 with a law degree.

== Confederacy and early career ==
In 1850, Coke moved to Texas and opened a law practice in Waco. In 1852, he married Mary Horne of Waco. The couple had four children, but all of them died before age 30.

In 1859, Coke was appointed by governor Hardin R. Runnels to lead a commission tasked with removing the remaining Comanche natives from West Texas and the Texas Hill Country.

Coke was a delegate to the Secession Convention at Austin in 1861. The convention's chief concern was keeping American slavery legal. Coke owned slaves himself. He voted that Texas should leave the United States to join the Confederacy.

He joined the Confederate Army as a private. In 1862, he raised a company that became part of the 15th Texas Infantry Regiment and served as its captain for the rest of the war. He was wounded in an action known as Bayou Bourbeau on November 3, 1863, near Opelousas, Louisiana. After the war, he returned home to Waco.

== Reconstruction ==
In 1865, Coke was appointed a Texas district court judge, and in 1866, he was elected as an associate justice to the Texas Supreme Court. The following year, the military Governor-General Philip Sheridan removed Coke and four other judges as "an impediment to reconstruction", in pursuit of unionist Reconstruction policies. The removal of the five judges became a cause célèbre and made their names famous, synonymous in the public eye with resistance to Union occupation.

Richard Coke leveraged resentment at Union occupation to construct a Democratic electoral coalition that ruled Texas for more than 100 years. Through Ku Klux Klan attacks, intimidation, and public lynching of Black voters and their white allies, Coke's coalition re-established conservative white control of Texas in the 1870s. In the following decades, disfranchisement of Black Texans was maintained with poll taxes and white primaries and the number of black voters would decrease sharply from more than 100,000 in the 1890s to 5,000 by 1906.

Having been removed by Sheridan, Coke ran for governor as a Democrat in 1873 and took office in January 1874. The Texas Supreme Court ruled his election invalid in an extraordinary habeas corpus writ called Ex parte Rodriguez because the polls were open for only one day, rather than the four days mentioned in the state constitution. The court is known as the "Semicolon Court" because the meaning of a particular semicolon in the constitution was important in the case. As recounted by the Texas State Historical Association, in response,

Disregarding the court ruling, the Democrats secured the keys to the second floor of the Capitol and took possession. [Incumbent Gov. Edmund] Davis was reported to have state troops stationed on the lower floor. The Travis Rifles (a Texas military unit created to fight Indians), summoned to protect Davis, were converted into a sheriff's posse and protected Coke. On January 15, 1874, Coke was inaugurated as governor. On January 16, Davis arranged for a truce, but he made one final appeal for federal intervention. A telegram from President Ulysses S. Grant said that he did not feel warranted in sending federal troops to keep Davis in office. Davis resigned his office on January 19. Coke's inauguration restored Democratic control in Texas.

Coke's administration was marked by vigorous action to balance the budget and by a revised state constitution adopted in 1876. He was also instrumental in creating the Agricultural and Mechanical College of Texas, which became Texas A&M University. Having once been removed from the Texas Supreme Court, as governor, he appointed all its members, naming as Chief Justice Oran Roberts (after the US Senate had refused to seat him). George F. Moore, who was Chief Justice when he had been fired along with Coke, became the first chief justice elected under Texas' 1876 Constitution, an honor he held until his death. Others from the Texas judiciary under the Confederacy received key appointments.

Once the new Constitution had been negotiated, Coke resigned his office in December 1876, following his election by the legislature to the United States Senate. By the time of his resignation, Texas Democrats had united with white supremacist groups such as the Ku Klux Klan to maintain political control of the state. Coke is a central figure of the "Redeemers" movement to restore white political dominance in the American South after the Civil War.

== Later life and death ==
Coke was re-elected to federal office in 1882 and 1888, serving in the 45th – 53rd Congresses until March 3, 1895. Coke was not a candidate for reelection in 1894.

Coke retired to his home in Waco and his nearby farm. He became ill with "progressive paralysis" in early 1897. After a few weeks of illness, he died at his home in Waco and was buried in Oakwood Cemetery.

== Legacy ==
Coke's rise to power marked the return of locally elected government in Texas and the establishment of a rigidly white supremacist Texas Democratic party that would maintain a strong hold on Texas government for over 100 years. Historians in the state praised Coke for this, and consolidated a version of Texas history that downplayed or omitted the liberal government that had preceded him. In 1916 the state archivist wrote:

Governor Coke had faith in his people. He believed in the supremacy of the Anglo-Saxon race—he prided himself in the rich blood of the Southern people. As their leader he fought back the tide of tyranny that was about to engulf them in the murky water of mulatto domination. He was a constructive statesman; he served his people with true fidelity and left Texas to rich heritage of a fruitful and useful like. His name is engraved on the scroll of immortals, and his footprints are in the sands of time.

— Sinclair Moreland, Texas state archivist (1916)

The 1876 constitution created under Coke's administration is the current Constitution of Texas. Coke County in West Texas is named for him.

Party political offices
Preceded by Andrew Jackson Hamilton	Democratic nominee for Governor of Texas; 1873, 1876	Succeeded by Oran Milo Roberts
Political offices
Preceded by Edmund J. Davis	Governor of Texas; 1874–1876	Succeeded by Richard B. Hubbard
U.S. Senate
Preceded by Morgan C. Hamilton	U.S. senator (Class 2) from Texas; 1877–1895; Served alongside: Samuel B. Maxey, John H. Reagan, Horace Chilton, Roger Q. Mills	Succeeded by Horace Chilton
