= 1873 Texas gubernatorial election =

- December 2, 1873
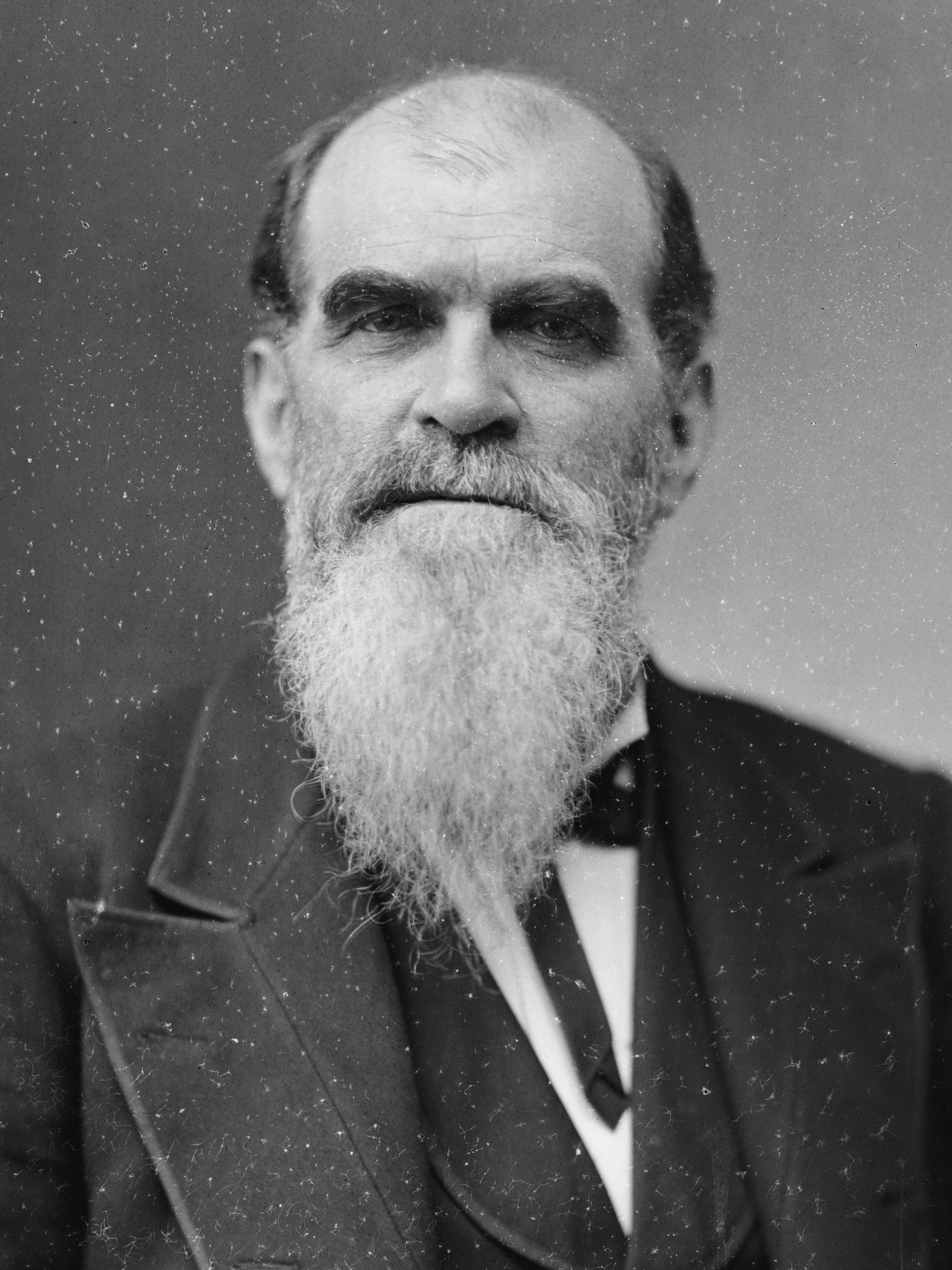

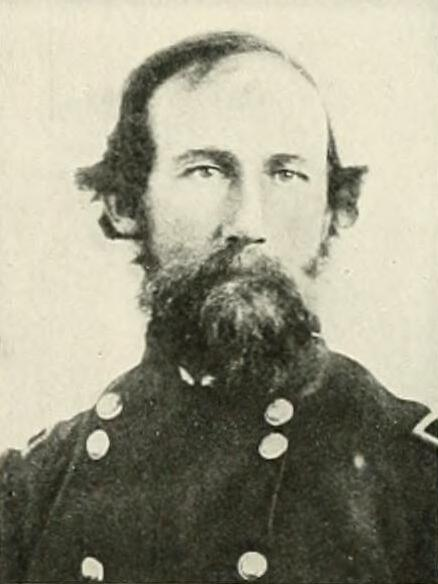
Candidate	Richard Coke	Edmund J. Davis
Party	Democratic	Republican
Popular vote	100,415	52,141
Percentage	65.77%	34.23%

Coke
50–60%
60–70%
70–80%
80–90%
>90%
Davis
50–60%
60–70%
70–80%
80–90%
No returns
Governor before election
Edmund J. Davis
Republican
Governor-elect
Richard Coke
Democratic

The 1873 Texas gubernatorial election was held to elect the governor of Texas. Incumbent Governor Edmund J. Davis ran for re-election to a second term, but was defeated by Democrat Richard Coke.

== General election ==
=== Candidates ===
- Richard Coke, former associate justice of the Texas Supreme Court (Democratic)
- Edmund J. Davis, incumbent governor (Republican)

=== Results ===
1873 Texas gubernatorial election (Note: Sources differ as to the vote totals in 1873. The Texas Almanac gives the votes as 85,549 for Coke and 42,633 for Davis (128,182 total). In Republicanism in Reconstruction Texas by Carl H. Moneyhan, the author cites the state archives which gives the vote as shown.)
Party	Candidate	Votes	%
Democratic	Richard Coke	100,415	65.77%
Republican	Edmund J. Davis (incumbent)	52,141	34.23%
Total votes		152,556	100.00%
Democratic gain from Republican			

==== By county ====
Results by county
County	Coke Democratic		Davis Republican		Margin		Total votes
County	Votes	%	Votes	%	Votes	%	Total votes
Anderson	1,135	55.34%	916	44.66%	219	10.68%	2,051
Angelina	462	79.93%	116	20.07%	346	59.86%	578
Aransas	127	80.38%	31	19.62%	96	60.76%	158
Atascosa	389	92.62%	31	7.38%	358	85.24%	420
Austin	913	50.30%	902	49.70%	11	0.61%	1,815
Bandera	156	85.25%	27	14.75%	129	70.49%	183
Bastrop	1,090	48.79%	1,144	51.21%	54	2.42%	2,234
Bee	114	94.21%	7	5.79%	107	88.43%	121
Bell	1,862	90.39%	198	9.61%	1,664	80.78%	2,060
Bexar	1,832	59.75%	1,234	40.25%	598	19.50%	3,066
Blanco	202	75.94%	64	24.06%	138	51.88%	266
Bosque	755	89.45%	89	10.55%	666	78.91%	844
Bowie	530	66.42%	268	33.58%	262	32.83%	798
Brazoria	336	23.53%	1,092	76.47%	756	52.94%	1,428
Brazos	1,197	59.46%	816	40.54%	381	18.93%	2,013
Brown	167	97.09%	5	2.91%	162	94.19%	172
Burleson	1,085	65.13%	581	34.87%	504	30.25%	1,666
Burnet	474	81.44%	108	18.56%	366	62.89%	582
Caldwell	740	60.66%	480	39.34%	260	21.31%	1,220
Calhoun	218	48.99%	227	51.01%	9	2.02%	445
Cameron	433	66.21%	221	33.79%	212	32.42%	654
Cass	863	68.55%	396	31.45%	467	37.09%	1,259
Chambers	208	80.93%	49	19.07%	159	61.87%	257
Cherokee	1,486	73.82%	527	26.18%	959	47.64%	2,013
Clay	77	96.25%	3	3.75%	74	92.50%	80
Collin	1,691	85.71%	282	14.29%	1,409	71.41%	1,973
Colorado	1,000	43.40%	1,304	56.60%	304	13.19%	2,304
Comal	363	53.62%	314	46.38%	49	7.24%	677
Comanche	500	97.28%	14	2.72%	486	94.55%	514
Cooke	1,128	95.19%	57	4.81%	1,071	90.38%	1,185
Coryell	1,121	96.14%	45	3.86%	1,076	92.28%	1,166
Dallas	2,628	88.66%	336	11.34%	2,292	77.33%	2,964
Delta	396	90.83%	40	9.17%	356	81.65%	436
Denton	1,249	91.37%	118	8.63%	1,131	82.74%	1,367
DeWitt	545	49.68%	552	50.32%	7	0.64%	1,097
Ellis	1,528	92.55%	123	7.45%	1,405	85.10%	1,651
El Paso	447	90.67%	46	9.33%	401	81.34%	493
Erath	376	86.64%	58	13.36%	318	73.27%	434
Falls	834	53.05%	738	46.95%	96	6.11%	1,572
Fannin	1,531	73.25%	559	26.75%	972	46.51%	2,090
Fayette	1,677	52.28%	1,531	47.72%	146	4.55%	3,208
Fort Bend	261	18.38%	1,159	81.62%	898	63.24%	1,420
Freestone	1,070	64.00%	602	36.00%	468	27.99%	1,672
Frio	69	84.15%	13	15.85%	56	68.29%	82
Galveston	2,492	70.86%	1,025	29.14%	1,467	41.71%	3,517
Gillespie	108	23.89%	344	76.11%	236	52.21%	452
Goliad	291	56.40%	225	43.60%	66	12.79%	516
Gonzales	1,054	71.75%	415	28.25%	639	43.50%	1,469
Grayson	2,265	82.07%	495	17.93%	1,770	64.13%	2,760
Gregg	358	69.92%	154	30.08%	204	39.84%	512
Grimes	1,329	45.37%	1,600	54.63%	271	9.25%	2,929
Guadalupe	888	52.30%	810	47.70%	78	4.59%	1,698
Hamilton	187	96.89%	6	3.11%	181	93.78%	193
Hardin	136	87.18%	20	12.82%	116	74.36%	156
Harris	2,966	57.76%	2,169	42.24%	797	15.52%	5,135
Harrison	999	30.85%	2,239	69.15%	1,240	38.30%	3,238
Hays	525	77.55%	152	22.45%	373	55.10%	677
Henderson	763	75.40%	249	24.60%	514	50.79%	1,012
Hidalgo	60	45.45%	72	54.55%	12	9.09%	132
Hill	1,312	89.86%	148	10.14%	1,164	79.73%	1,460
Hood	773	96.02%	32	3.98%	741	92.05%	805
Hopkins	1,871	90.65%	193	9.35%	1,678	81.30%	2,064
Houston	1,014	48.94%	1,058	51.06%	44	2.12%	2,072
Hunt	1,469	91.53%	136	8.47%	1,333	83.05%	1,605
Jack	111	56.92%	84	43.08%	27	13.85%	195
Jackson	164	40.20%	244	59.80%	80	19.61%	408
Jasper	345	74.03%	121	25.97%	224	48.07%	466
Jefferson	277	79.60%	71	20.40%	206	59.20%	348
Johnson	1,407	97.57%	35	2.43%	1,372	95.15%	1,442
Karnes	185	67.77%	88	32.23%	97	35.53%	273
Kaufman	1,070	88.28%	142	11.72%	928	76.57%	1,212
Kendall	70	25.93%	200	74.07%	130	48.15%	270
Kerr	143	65.00%	77	35.00%	66	30.00%	220
Kinney	94	45.19%	114	54.81%	20	9.62%	208
Lamar	1,724	74.12%	602	25.88%	1,122	48.24%	2,326
Lampasas	375	96.65%	13	3.35%	362	93.30%	388
Lavaca	997	71.37%	400	28.63%	597	42.73%	1,397
Leon	1,603	77.63%	462	22.37%	1,141	55.25%	2,065
Limestone	1,231	78.51%	337	21.49%	894	57.02%	1,568
Live Oak	135	91.22%	13	8.78%	122	82.43%	148
Llano	108	93.91%	7	6.09%	101	87.83%	115
Madison	449	71.73%	177	28.27%	272	43.45%	626
Marion	1,018	46.00%	1,195	54.00%	177	8.00%	2,213
Mason	82	66.67%	41	33.33%	41	33.33%	123
Matagorda	186	32.40%	388	67.60%	202	35.19%	574
Maverick	70	57.38%	52	42.62%	18	14.75%	122
McLennan	1,631	65.01%	878	34.99%	753	30.01%	2,509
Medina	76	18.91%	326	81.09%	250	62.19%	402
Menard	74	57.81%	54	42.19%	20	15.63%	128
Milam	997	87.84%	138	12.16%	859	75.68%	1,135
Montague	426	89.31%	51	10.69%	375	78.62%	477
Montgomery	689	49.32%	708	50.68%	19	1.36%	1,397
Nacogdoches	987	71.42%	395	28.58%	592	42.84%	1,382
Navarro	1,212	72.40%	462	27.60%	750	44.80%	1,674
Newton	265	73.41%	96	26.59%	169	46.81%	361
Nueces	199	38.87%	313	61.13%	114	22.27%	512
Orange	171	79.53%	44	20.47%	127	59.07%	215
Palo Pinto	262	98.87%	3	1.13%	259	97.74%	265
Panola	1,114	80.61%	268	19.39%	846	61.22%	1,382
Parker	955	83.85%	184	16.15%	771	67.69%	1,139
Polk	447	73.76%	159	26.24%	288	47.52%	606
Rains	251	86.25%	40	13.75%	211	72.51%	291
Red River	1,321	58.45%	939	41.55%	382	16.90%	2,260
Refugio	139	87.97%	19	12.03%	120	75.95%	158
Robertson	1,162	53.75%	1,000	46.25%	162	7.49%	2,162
Rockwall	229	87.40%	33	12.60%	196	74.81%	262
Rusk	1,796	57.97%	1,302	42.03%	494	15.95%	3,098
Sabine	340	75.22%	112	24.78%	228	50.44%	452
San Augustine	381	50.20%	378	49.80%	3	0.40%	759
San Jacinto	261	37.18%	441	62.82%	180	25.64%	702
San Patricio	91	88.35%	12	11.65%	79	76.70%	103
San Saba	291	99.32%	2	0.68%	289	98.63%	293
Shelby	676	62.71%	402	37.29%	274	25.42%	1,078
Smith	1,589	54.27%	1,339	45.73%	250	8.54%	2,928
Starr	100	50.76%	97	49.24%	3	1.52%	197
Tarrant	1,820	92.95%	138	7.05%	1,682	85.90%	1,958
Titus	1,702	87.19%	250	12.81%	1,452	74.39%	1,952
Travis	2,167	60.65%	1,406	39.35%	761	21.30%	3,573
Trinity	450	86.54%	70	13.46%	380	73.08%	520
Tyler	556	97.72%	13	2.28%	543	95.43%	569
Upshur	1,166	65.84%	605	34.16%	561	31.68%	1,771
Uvalde	148	87.06%	22	12.94%	126	74.12%	170
Van Zandt	651	72.74%	244	27.26%	407	45.47%	895
Victoria	450	46.54%	517	53.46%	67	6.93%	967
Walker	774	46.88%	877	53.12%	103	6.24%	1,651
Waller	433	39.26%	670	60.74%	237	21.49%	1,103
Washington	1,697	42.20%	2,324	57.80%	627	15.59%	4,021
Webb	91	15.09%	512	84.91%	421	69.82%	603
Williamson	1,127	80.79%	268	19.21%	859	61.58%	1,395
Wilson	330	78.01%	93	21.99%	237	56.03%	423
Wise	584	89.85%	66	10.15%	518	79.69%	650
Wood	681	80.12%	169	19.88%	512	60.24%	850
Zapata	49	44.14%	62	55.86%	13	11.71%	111
Total	100,415	65.77%	52,141	34.15%	48,274	31.62%	152,556

==== By congressional district ====
Coke won all four of Texas' (non-at-large) congressional districts, each of which were held by Democrats since 1871.

District	Coke	Davis	Representative
1st	61.7%	38.3%	William S. Herndon
2nd	81.8%	18.2%	William P. McLean
3rd	57.9%	42.1%	Dewitt C. Giddings
4th	62.5%	37.5%	John Hancock

== Aftermath ==
Within the month, the Texas Supreme Court ruled the election invalid in Ex parte Rodriguez, an extraordinary habeas corpus writ holding that the election had been unconstitutional because the polls were open for only one day. The new Constitution of 1869 had provided in Article III, Section 6, that all elections would be held "at the county seats of the several counties until otherwise provided by law; and the polls shall be opened for four days." Since the decision hinged crucially on the interpretation of the semi-colon, Texan historians have referred to the Court during this period as the "Semicolon Court," following its use by Oran Milo Roberts in his history of the Reconstruction period in the state.

The Ex parte Rodriguez ruling was never enforced. On January 15, disregarding the court's ruling and on the belief that Davis had stationed militiamen on the first floor of the Texas State Capitol, a group of Democrats entered using keys through the second to have Coke sworn into office. Davis summoned state troops to his defense, but upon their arrival, they joined Coke. Coke was sworn in and Davis swore for a truce; after President Ulysses S. Grant declined to send federal troops to aid his hold on the Capitol, Davis left office peacefully on January 19, bringing an effective end to the Reconstruction era in Texas. The Democratic Party would control Texas for more than a century; the next Republican governor of the state was Bill Clements in 1979.
