= 1876 Texas Constitution Ratification Measure =

Texas Constitution of 1876 Ratification Measure
- February 15, 1876
- For the Constitution or Against the Constitution

Results
Choice	Votes	%
Yes	136,606	70.69%
No	56,652	29.31%
Total votes	193,258	100.00%

The Texas Constitution of 1876 Ratification Measure was a constitutional convention referral put before Texas voters on February 15, 1876. The measure sought the formal adoption of a new state constitution to replace the Constitution of 1869, which had been drafted during the Reconstruction era.

The measure was approved by a significant margin, establishing the foundational law that remains the basis of Texas government today.

== Historical Background ==
Following the end of the Civil War and the subsequent Reconstruction period, there was widespread dissatisfaction among many Texans, particularly the "Redeemer" Democrats, with the Constitution of 1869. Critics viewed the existing document as a symbol of centralized power and "Radical Republican" rule.

In 1875, a Constitutional Convention was convened in Austin from September 6 to November 24. The delegates, dominated by the Grange (a farmers' organization), sought to:

- Strictly limit the power of the state government.
- Reduce taxes and state expenditures.
- Decentralize the public school system.
- Shorten the terms of elected officials.

== Summary of Constitution ==
=== Preamble ===
Humbly invoking the blessings of Almighty God, the people of the State of Texas do ordain and establish this Constitution.

— Constitution of Texas, preamble

=== Article 1: "Bill of Rights" ===
Article 1 of the Texas Constitution serves as its bill of rights. Originally composed of 29 sections, five additional sections have since been added. Several of these provisions outline specific, fundamental limitations on the power of the state government. Importantly, the protections offered by the Texas Bill of Rights apply solely to actions by the Texas government. However, many protections found in the U.S. Constitution are also applied to state governments through the Due Process Clause of the Fourteenth Amendment.

==== Differences with the U.S. Bill of Rights ====
While the Texas Bill of Rights includes many rights similar to those found in the U.S. Bill of Rights, it is notably more detailed and contains several provisions that are unique to Texas.

- Section 12 recognizes the writ of habeas corpus as an unqualified right and prohibits its suspension under any circumstances. This differs from the U.S. Constitution, which allows suspension “in Cases of Rebellion or Invasion when the public safety may require it.”
- Section 21 prohibits both corruption of blood and forfeiture of estates, including in cases of suicide. This expands upon the U.S. Constitution's Article III, Section 3, which limits such forfeitures to only during the life of the person convicted.
- Section 34 protects the right of the people to hunt, fish, and harvest wildlife, subject to regulations intended for wildlife conservation. The section explicitly clarifies that it does not alter any laws relating to trespassing, property rights, or eminent domain.

==== Other rights ====
- Section 11 guarantees that individuals detained before trial are eligible for bail by sufficient sureties, with exceptions for capital offenses and other limited circumstances defined by law.

=== Article 2: "The Powers of Government" ===
Article 2 provides for the separation of powers of the legislative, executive, and judicial branches of the state government, prohibiting any branch from encroaching on the powers of the others.

=== Article 3: "Legislative Department" ===
Article 3 vests the legislative power of the state in the "Legislature of the State of Texas", consisting of the state's Senate and House of Representatives. It also lists the qualifications required of senators and representatives and regulates many details of the legislative process. The article (the longest in the constitution) contains many substantive limitations on the power of the legislature and a large number of exceptions to those limitations.

Two-thirds (2/3) of the elected members in either chamber constitutes a quorum to do business therein (Section 10), contrary to the provision for the United States Congress requiring only a majority (this larger requirement has resulted in occasions where a significant number of members from one political party, in an attempt to stop legislation, have in the past left the state so as to deny a quorum). A smaller number in each chamber is empowered to adjourn from day to day and compel the attendance of absent members.

As with the United States Constitution, either house may originate bills (Section 31), but bills to raise revenue must originate in the House of Representatives (Section 33).

Section 39 allows a bill to take effect immediately upon the Governor's signature if the bill passes both chambers by a two-thirds vote, unless otherwise specified in the bill. If the bill does not pass by this majority it takes effect on the first day of the next fiscal year (in Texas, the fiscal year runs from September 1 until the following August 31).

The largest Section within this article is Section 49 ("State Debts"), which includes 30 separate sub-sections (including two sub-sections both added in 2003 and both curiously numbered as "49-n", along with two other sub-sub-sections numbered "49-d-14"). Section 49 limits the power of the Legislature to incur debt to only specific purposes as stated in the Constitution; in order to allow the Legislature to incur debt for a purpose not stated numerous amendments to this section have had to be added and voted upon by the people.

In addition, Section 49a requires the Texas Comptroller of Public Accounts to certify, prior to the Legislature entering into its regular session, the amount of available cash on hand and anticipated revenues for the next biennium (officially titled the "Biennial Revenue Estimate" or "BRE"; the biennium covers the next two fiscal years beginning on September 1 of odd-numbered years and ending August 31 two years later); no appropriation may exceed this amount (except in cases of emergency, and then only with a four-fifths vote of both chambers), and the Comptroller is required to reject and return to the Legislature any appropriation in violation of this requirement.

Section 49-g (one of two such sections numbered as such, the other—now repealed—dealt with funding for the later-cancelled Superconducting Supercollider Project) created the state's "Rainy Day Fund" (technically called the "Economic Stabilization Fund").

=== Article 4: "Executive Department" ===
Article 4 describes the powers and duties of the Governor, Lieutenant Governor, Secretary of State, Comptroller, Commissioner of the General Land Office, and Attorney General. With the exception of the Secretary of State the above officials are directly elected in what is known as a "plural executive" system. (Although the Texas Agriculture Commissioner is also directly elected, that is the result of Legislative action, not a Constitutional requirement.)

The qualifications of the Governor of Texas is that he is at least thirty years of age, a citizen of the United States, and had resided in the State for at least five years preceding his election. The Governor is prohibited from holding any other office, whether civil, military or corporate, during his tenure in office, nor may he practice (or receive compensation for) any profession.

The Governor is the "Chief Executive Officer of the State" and the "Commander in Chief of the military forces of the State, except when they are called in actual service of the United States". He is vested with power to call forth the Militia, convene the Legislature for special session in extraordinary occasions, to execute the laws of the State, and to fill up vacancies not otherwise provided for by law, if consented to by two-thirds of the Senate. The Governor has a qualified negative on all bills passed by the Legislature, which may be overridden by two-thirds of both Houses of the Legislature by votes of the yeas and nays. Finally, the Secretary of State (who has the constitutional duty of keeping the Seal of the State) is appointed by the Governor, by and with the advice and consent of the Senate.

All commissions are signed by the Governor, being affixed with the State Seal and attested to by the Secretary of State.

Under Section 16 of this article, the Lieutenant Governor automatically assumes the power of Governor if and when the Governor travels outside of the state, or is subject to impeachment by the Texas House of Representatives.

=== Article 5: "Judicial Department" ===
Article 5 describes the composition, powers, and jurisdiction of the state's Supreme Court, Court of Criminal Appeals, and District, County, and Commissioners Courts, as well as the Justice of the Peace Courts.

=== Article 6: "Suffrage" ===
Article 6 denies voting rights to minors, felons, and people who are deemed mentally incompetent by a court (though the Legislature may make exceptions in the latter two cases). It also describes rules for elections.

Qualified voters are, except in treason, felony and breach of peace, privileged from arrest when attending at the polls, going and returning therefrom.

=== Article 7: "Education" ===
Article 7 establishes provisions for public schools, asylums, and universities. Section 1 states, "it shall be the duty of the Legislature of the State to establish and make suitable provision for the support and maintenance of an efficient system of public free schools". This issue has surfaced repeatedly in lawsuits involving the State's funding of education and the various restrictions it has placed on local school districts.

This Article also discusses the creation and maintenance of the Permanent University Fund (Sections 11, 11a, and 11b) and mandates the establishment of "a University of the first class" (Section 10) to be called The University of Texas, as well as "an Agricultural, and Mechanical department" (Section 13, today's Texas A&M University, which opened seven years prior); it also establishes Prairie View A&M University in Section 14. The University of Texas was originally created in the Constitution of 1858, and Texas A&M University was created from the Morrill Act.

=== Article 8: "Taxation and Revenue" ===
Article 8 places various restrictions on the ability of the Legislature and local governments to impose taxes. Most of these restrictions concern local property taxes.

Section 1-e prohibits statewide property taxes. This Section has been the subject of numerous school district financing lawsuits claiming that other Legislative restrictions on local property taxes have created a de facto statewide property tax; the Texas Supreme Court has at times ruled that the restrictions did in fact do so (and thus were unconstitutional) and at other times ruled that they did not.

=== Article 9: "Counties" ===
Article 9 provides rules for the creation of counties (now numbering 254) and for determining the location of county seats. It also includes several provisions regarding the creation of county-wide hospital districts in specified counties, as well as other miscellaneous provisions regarding airports and mental health.

=== Article 10: "Railroads" ===
Article 10 contains a single section declaring that railroads are considered "public highways" and railroad carriers "common carriers".

=== Article 11: "Municipal Corporations" ===
Article 11 recognizes counties as legal political subunits of the State, grants certain powers to cities and counties, empowers the legislature to form school and other special districts.

Texas operates under Dustin's Rule: counties and non-school special districts are not granted home rule privileges, while cities and school districts have those privileges only in the limited instances specified below.

Sections 4 and 5 discuss the operation of cities based on population. Section 4 states that a city with a population of 5,000 or fewer has only those powers granted to it by general law; Section 5 permits a city, once its population exceeds 5,000, to adopt a charter under home rule provided the charter is not inconsistent with limits placed by the Texas Constitution or general law (the city may amend to maintain home rule status even if its population subsequently falls to 5,000 or fewer).

=== Article 12: "Private Corporations" ===
Article 12 contains two sections directing the Legislature to enact general laws for the creation of private corporations and prohibiting the creation of private corporations by special law.

=== Article 13: "Spanish and Mexican Land Titles" ===
Article 13 established provisions for Spanish and Mexican land titles from the Mexican War Era.

=== Article 14: "Public Lands and Land Office" ===
Article 14 contains a single section establishing the General Land Office (the office of Commissioner of the General Land Office is discussed under Article IV).

=== Article 15: "Impeachment" ===
Article 15 describes the process of impeachment and lists grounds on which to impeach judges. The House of Representatives is granted the power of impeachment, while the Senate has power to try all impeachments.

No person may be convicted save by the consent of two-thirds of the Senators present, who have taken an oath or affirmation to impartially try the impeached. Judgement in impeachment cases does not extend beyond removal from office and disqualification from public office. The convicted individual remains subject to trial, indictment and punishment according to law.

All officers while subject to impeachment charges are suspended until the verdict by the Senate has been delivered.

=== Article 16: "General Provisions" ===
Article 16 contains miscellaneous provisions, including limits on interest rates, civil penalties for murder, and the punishment for bribery.

Section 14 All civil officers shall reside within the State; and all district or county officers within their districts or counties and shall keep their offices at such places as may be required by law; and failure to comply with this condition shall vacate the office's held.

Section 28 prohibits garnishment of wages, except for spousal maintenance and child support payments (however, this does not limit Federal garnishment for items such as student loan payments or income taxes).

Section 37 provides for the constitutional protection of the mechanic's lien.

Section 50 provides for protection of a homestead against forced sale to pay debts, except for foreclosure on debts related to the homestead (mortgage, taxes, mechanic's liens, and home equity loans including home equity lines of credit).

=== Article 17: "Mode of amending the Constitution of this State" ===
Notwithstanding the large number of amendments (and proposed amendments) that the Texas Constitution has had since its inception, the only method of amending the Constitution prescribed by Article 17 is via the Legislature, subject to voter approval. The Constitution does not provide for amendment by initiative or referendum, constitutional convention, or any other means.

The section also prescribes specific details for notifying the public of elections to approve amendments. It requires that the legislature publish a notice in officially approved newspapers that briefly summarizes each amendment and shows how each amendment will be described on the ballot. It also requires that the full text of each amendment be posted at each county courthouse at least 50 days (but no sooner than 60 days) before the election date.

== Legacy ==
The approval of this measure effectively ended the Reconstruction era in Texas politics. The resulting Texas Constitution of 1876 is noted for being one of the longest and most frequently amended state constitutions in the United States. Because the document was designed to be highly restrictive, the state legislature often finds it necessary to propose constitutional amendments to handle modern governance issues that the original 1876 text did not anticipate.
