= Edmund J. Davis =

Governor of Texas from 1870 to 1874

Edmund Jackson Davis
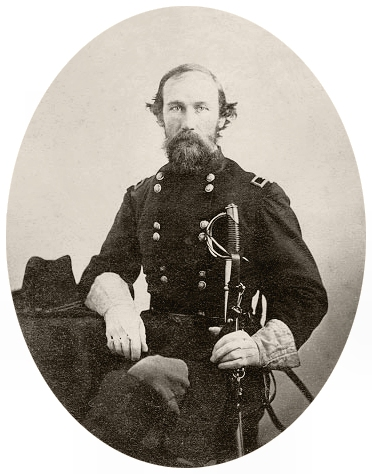
- Brig. Gen. Edmund J. Davis in a Federal uniform

14th Governor of Texas
- In office January 8, 1870 – January 15, 1874
- Lieutenant: Vacant
- Preceded by: Elisha M. Pease
- Succeeded by: Richard Coke

Chair of the Texas Republican Party
- In office 1875–1883
- Preceded by: John L. Haynes
- Succeeded by: Norris Wright Cuney

Personal details
- Born: October 2, 1827 St. Augustine, Florida, U.S.
- Died: February 7, 1883 (aged 55) Austin, Texas, U.S.
- Resting place: Texas State Cemetery; Austin, Texas, U.S.
- Party: Republican
- Spouse: Anne Elizabeth Britton
- Profession: Lawyer and politician

Military service
- Allegiance: United States (Union)
- Branch/service: U.S. Army (Union Army)
- Years of service: 1862–1865
- Rank: Brigadier General
- Commands: 1st Texas Cavalry Regiment
- Battles/wars: American Civil War

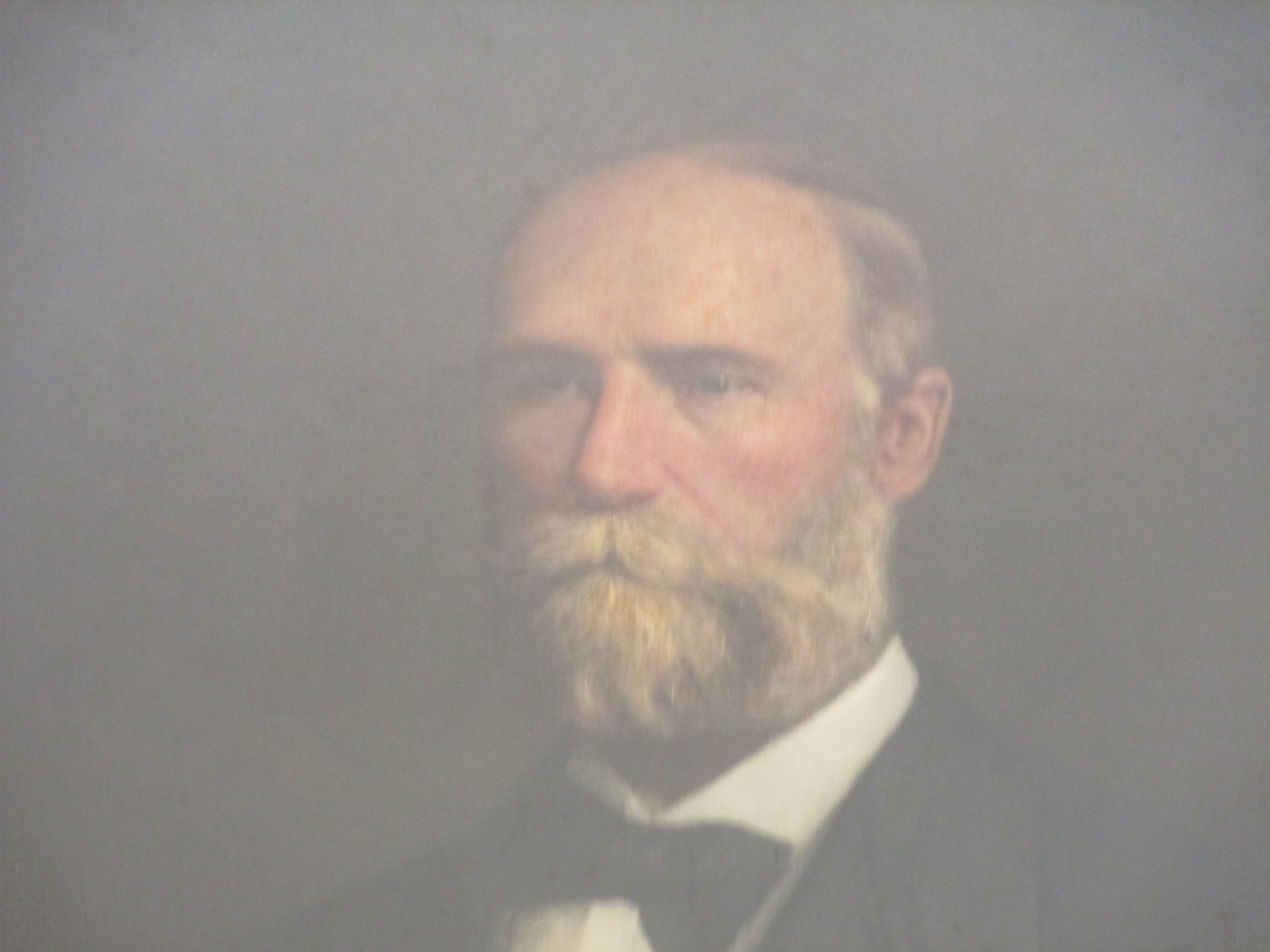
Davis as he appears at the Texas State Capitol in Austin, Texas

Edmund Jackson Davis (October 2, 1827 – February 7, 1883) was an American lawyer, soldier, and politician. Davis was a Southern Unionist and a general in the Union Army in the American Civil War. He also served as the 14th governor of Texas from 1870 to 1874, during the Reconstruction era. Davis supported civil rights and voting rights for African Americans. Reviled by many former Confederate Texans and white supremacists during and after the Civil War as a traitor for his open support for the North and his attempts to break up Texas into several Northern-controlled states, Davis leased prisoners to private corporations to alleviate state budget shortfalls. He was the only Republican to serve as governor between statehood and the election of Bill Clements in 1978.

== Early years ==
Davis was born in St. Augustine, Florida, a son of William Godwin Davis and the former Mary Ann Channer. His father was a lawyer and land developer in St. Augustine, the oldest permanent settlement in the United States. In 1848, after the signing of the Treaty of Guadalupe Hidalgo, Davis moved with his parents to Galveston, Texas.

The next year, Davis moved to Corpus Christi, where he was admitted to the bar. He was an inspector and deputy collector of customs from 1849 to 1853, when he was appointed district attorney of the 12th Judicial District, which included Webb County in south Texas. He became a judge in that district.

The 1850 census has Davis living on Grant Street in downtown Laredo, the seat of Webb County. Davis, three carpenters, and a laborer were residing, apparently in a boarding house, with Tomasa Benavides and her children when the census was taken that year. He subsequently maintained a ranch in Webb County and conducted his law practice in Laredo. For a time he was a judge of the state's 29th Judicial District.

== Civil War years ==
In early 1861, Edmund Davis supported Governor Sam Houston in his stand against secession. Davis also urged Robert E. Lee not to violate his oath of allegiance to the United States. Davis ran to become a delegate to the Secession Convention but was defeated. He thereafter refused to take an oath of allegiance to the Confederate States of America and was removed from his judgeship. He travelled from Texas and took refuge in Union-held New Orleans, Louisiana. He next sailed to Washington, D.C., where President Abraham Lincoln issued him a colonel's commission with the authority to recruit the 1st Texas Cavalry Regiment (Union).

Davis recruited his regiment from Union men who had fled from Texas to Louisiana. The regiment would see considerable action during the remainder of the war. On November 10, 1864, President Lincoln appointed Davis as a brigadier general of volunteers. Lincoln did not submit Davis's nomination to this grade to the U.S. Senate until December 12, 1864. The U.S. Senate confirmed the appointment on February 14, 1865. Davis was among those present when General Edmund Kirby Smith surrendered the Confederate forces in Texas on June 2, 1865. Davis was mustered out of the volunteers on August 24, 1865.

== Post war ==
Following the end of the war, Davis became a member of the 1866 Texas Constitutional Convention. He supported the rights of freed slaves and urged the division of Texas into several Republican-controlled states.

In 1869, he was narrowly elected governor against Andrew Jackson Hamilton, a Unionist Democrat. A Radical Republican during Reconstruction, his term in office was controversial.

On July 22, 1870, the Texas State Police came into being by Radical Republican legislation. The State Police were to have extraordinary powers, including taking offenders from one county to another for trial and of operating undercover as secret agents. It worked against racially based crimes, and included black police officers, which caused protest from former slaveowners (and future segregationists). Davis created the "State Guard of Texas" and the "Reserve Militia", which were forerunners of the Texas National Guard. The Printing Bill provided an official public printer and a state journal and provided that regional newspapers be designated to print the various required official notices.

Davis' government was marked by a commitment to the civil rights of African Americans. One of his protégés was Norris Wright Cuney of Galveston, who continued the struggle for equality until his own death in 1898 and is honored as one of the important figures in Texas and American black history. Though Davis was highly unpopular among former Confederates, and most material written about him for many years was unfavorable, he was considered to have been a hero for the Union Army. He also gained the respect and friendship of Spanish-speaking residents on the Rio Grande frontier.

In 1873, Davis was defeated for reelection by Democrat Richard Coke (42,633 votes to 85,549 votes) in an election marked by irregularities. Davis contested the results and refused to leave his office on the ground floor of the Capitol. Democratic lawmakers and Governor-elect Coke reportedly had to climb ladders to the Capitol's second story, where the legislature convened. When President Grant refused to send troops to the defeated governor's rescue, Davis reluctantly left the capital in January 1874. He locked the door to the governor's office and took the key, forcing Coke's supporters to break in with an axe. John Henninger Reagan helped to oust him after he tried to stay in office beyond the end of his term. Davis was the last Republican governor of Texas until Republican Bill Clements defeated the Democrat John Luke Hill in 1978 and assumed the governorship the following January, 105 years after Davis vacated the office.

Following his defeat, Davis was nominated to be collector of customs at Galveston but declined the appointment because he disliked U.S. President Rutherford B. Hayes. He ran for governor again in 1880 but was soundly defeated. His name was placed in nomination for Vice President of the United States at the 1880 Republican National Convention, which met in Chicago and chose James A. Garfield as the standard-bearer. Had Davis succeeded, he might have wound up in the White House, as did Chester A. Arthur, the man who received the vice presidential nomination that year. Davis lost an election for the United States House of Representatives in 1882.

After Democrats regained power in the state legislature, they passed laws making voter registration more difficult, such as requiring payment of poll taxes, which worked to disfranchise blacks, Mexican Americans and poor whites. They also instituted a white primary. In the 1890s more than 100,000 blacks were voting, but by 1906 only 5,000 managed to get through these barriers. As Texas became essentially a one-party state, the white primary excluded minorities from the political competitive process. They did not fully recover their constitutional rights until after enforcement under the Voting Rights Act of 1965.

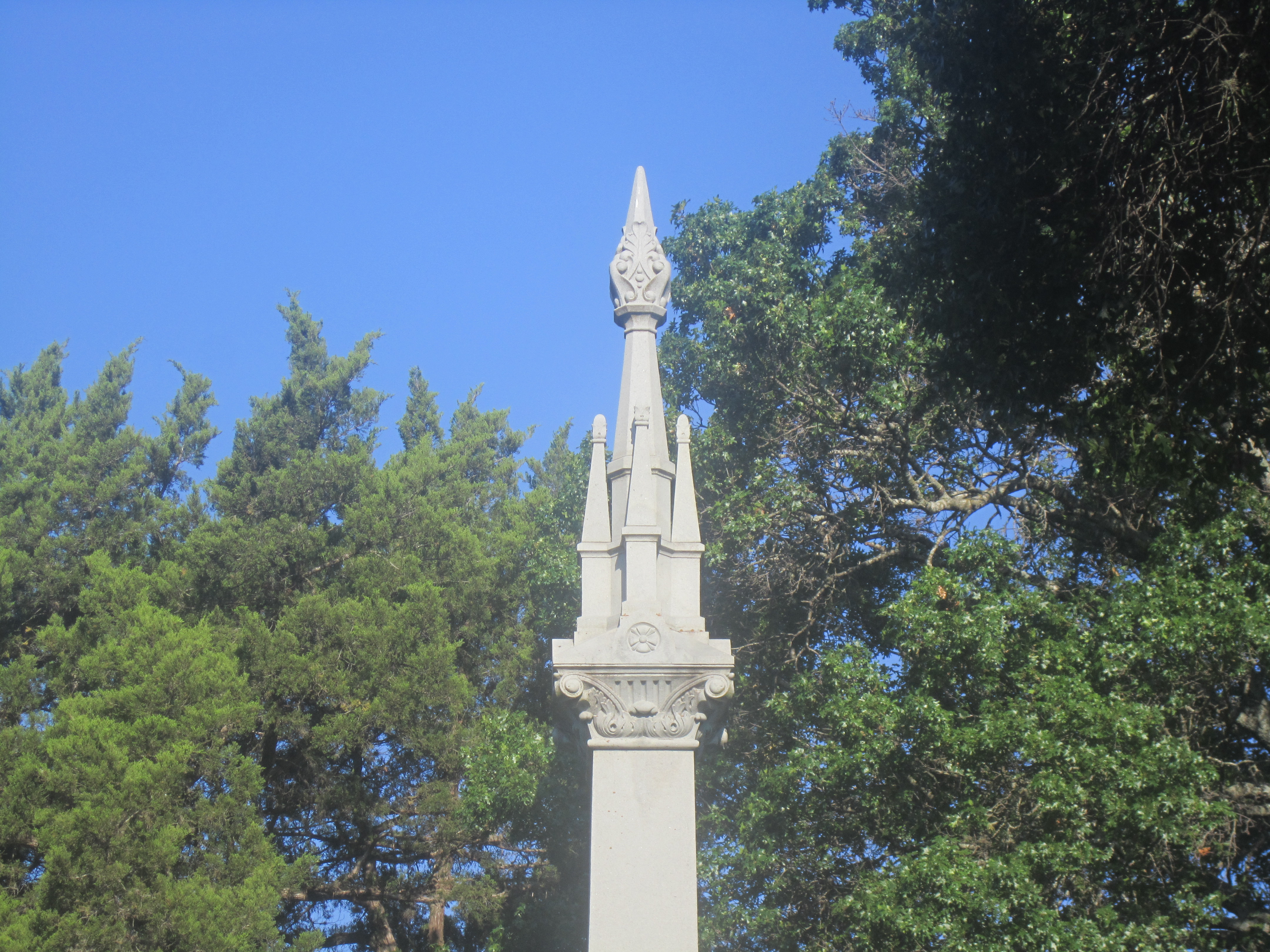
Upper part of the Davis Monument at the Texas State Cemetery in Austin

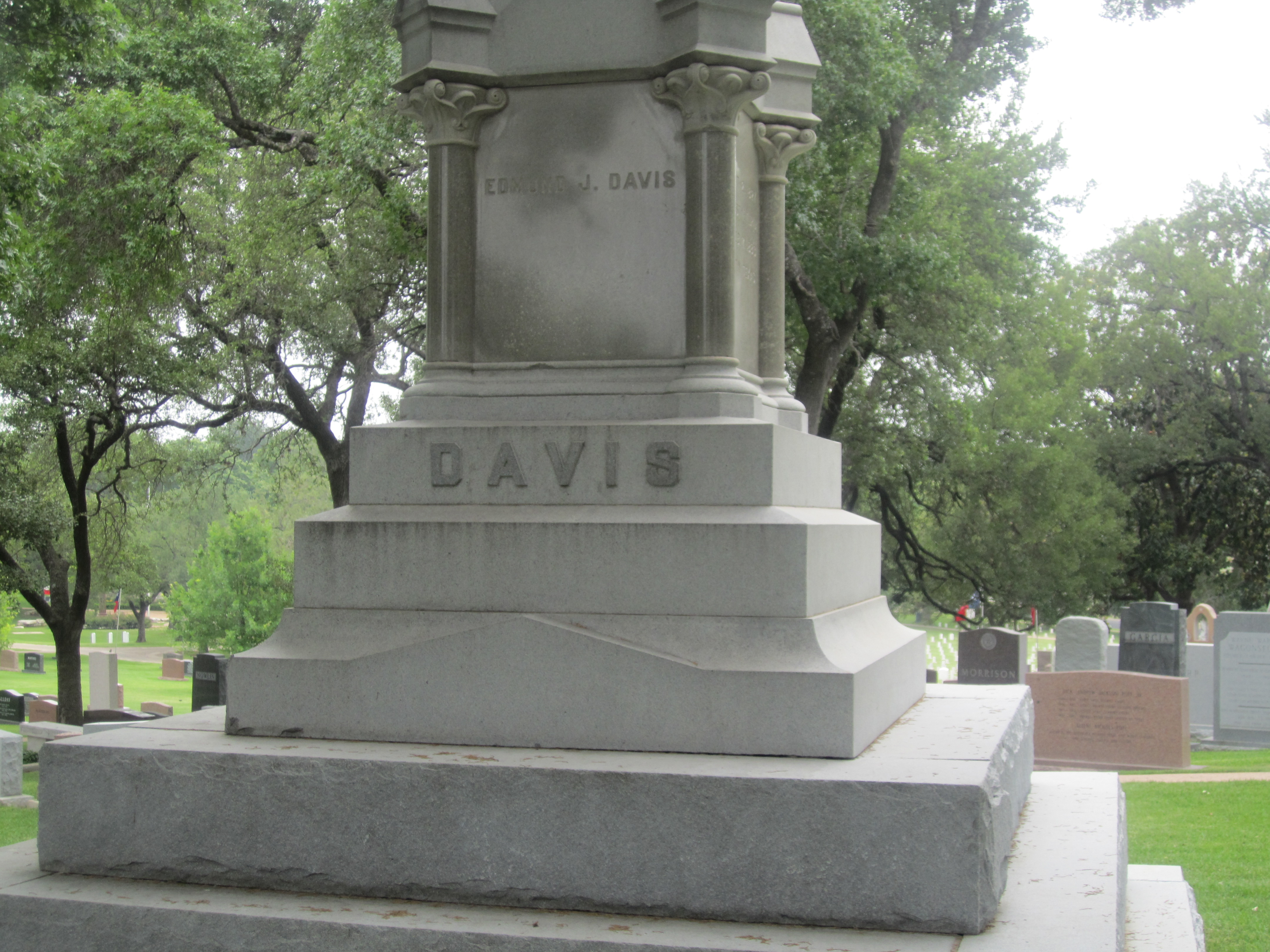
Base of the large Davis grave monument at Texas State Cemetery in Austin, Texas

Edmund J. Davis died in 1883 and was given a war hero's burial at the Texas State Cemetery in Austin. A large gravestone was placed in Davis's honor by a brother. Davis was survived by his wife, the former Anne Elizabeth Britton (whose father, Forbes Britton, had been chief of staff to Texas Governor Sam Houston), and two sons: Britton (a West Point graduate and military officer) and Waters (an attorney and merchant in El Paso).

== See also ==
- List of American Civil War generals (Union)
- Battle of La Ebonal

Party political offices
Preceded by Elisha M. Pease	Republican nominee for Governor of Texas; 1869, 1873	Succeeded by William Chambers
Preceded by Anthony Banning Norton	Republican nominee for Governor of Texas; 1880	Vacant Title next held by Anthony Banning Norton
Political offices
Preceded by Elisha M. Pease	Governor of Texas; 1870–1874	Succeeded by Richard Coke
