= National Register of Historic Places listings in Etowah County, Alabama =

Location of Etowah County in Alabama

This is a list of the National Register of Historic Places listings in Etowah County, Alabama.

This is intended to be a complete list of the properties and districts on the National Register of Historic Places in Etowah County, Alabama, United States. Latitude and longitude coordinates are provided for many National Register properties and districts; these locations may be seen together in an online map.

There are 15 properties and districts listed on the National Register in the county.

This National Park Service list is complete through NPS recent listings posted July 10, 2026.

== Current listings ==
	Name on the Register	Image	Date listed	Location	City or town	Description
1	Alabama City Library	Alabama City Library	December 27, 1974 (#74000410)	1 Cabot Ave. 34°01′32″N 86°02′38″W	Gadsden	
2	Alabama City Wall Street Historic District	Alabama City Wall Street Historic District	May 16, 2002 (#02000484)	Roughly along Wall St. from Norris Ave. to Meighan Boulevard; 34°01′14″N 86°02′44″W	Gadsden	
3	Attalla Downtown Historic District	Attalla Downtown Historic District	December 11, 2013 (#13000893)	3rd St. N., 4th St. N. & 5th Ave. S. 34°01′21″N 86°05′22″W	Attalla	
4	Eleventh Street School	Eleventh Street School	May 10, 1984 (#84000616)	1026 Chestnut St. 34°00′49″N 86°01′05″W	Gadsden	
5	Forrest Cemetery Chapel and Comfort Station	Forrest Cemetery Chapel and Comfort Station	September 3, 1992 (#92001069)	1100 S. 15th St. 34°00′41″N 86°01′34″W	Gadsden	
6	Gadsden Coca-Cola Bottling Plant	Gadsden Coca-Cola Bottling Plant	November 17, 2023 (#100009569)	644 Walnut Street; 34°00′41″N 86°00′34″W	Gadsden	
7	Gadsden Downtown Historic District	Gadsden Downtown Historic District	September 26, 1997 (#97001165)	Along Broad St., roughly bounded by Locust, 3rd, S. 5th, Chestnut, and 7th Sts. 34°00′49″N 86°00′17″W	Gadsden	
8	Gadsden Times-News Building	Gadsden Times-News Building	January 11, 1983 (#83002967)	4th and Chestnut Sts. 34°00′44″N 86°00′14″W	Gadsden	
9	Charles Gunn House	Charles Gunn House	February 19, 1993 (#93000052)	872 Chestnut St. 34°00′50″N 86°00′54″W	Gadsden	
10	Colonel O.R. Hood House	Colonel O.R. Hood House	May 8, 1986 (#86001000)	862 Chestnut St. 34°00′50″N 86°00′51″W	Gadsden	Now houses the Woman's Club
11	Legion Park Bowl	Legion Park Bowl	September 28, 1988 (#88001581)	336 1st St., S. 34°00′30″N 86°00′05″W	Gadsden	
12	Noojin House and Bellevue-Mineral Springs Hotel Site	Noojin House and Bellevue-Mineral Springs Hotel Site	June 27, 2023 (#100008433)	326 Bellevue Dr. 34°01′49″N 86°01′16″W	Gadsden	
13	Turrentine Historic District	Turrentine Historic District	July 6, 2005 (#05000649)	300-633 Turrentine Ave. 34°00′31″N 86°00′51″W	Gadsden	
14	U.S. Post Office	U.S. Post Office	June 21, 1983 (#83002968)	401 4th St. 34°01′19″N 86°05′25″W	Attalla	
15	Campbell Professional Building	Campbell Professional Building	June 3, 1976 (#76000325)	600 Broad St. 34°00′52″N 86°00′24″W	Gadsden	

== See also ==
- List of National Historic Landmarks in Alabama
- National Register of Historic Places listings in Alabama
