= Alabama City, Alabama =

Alabama City Gadsden
- Former City
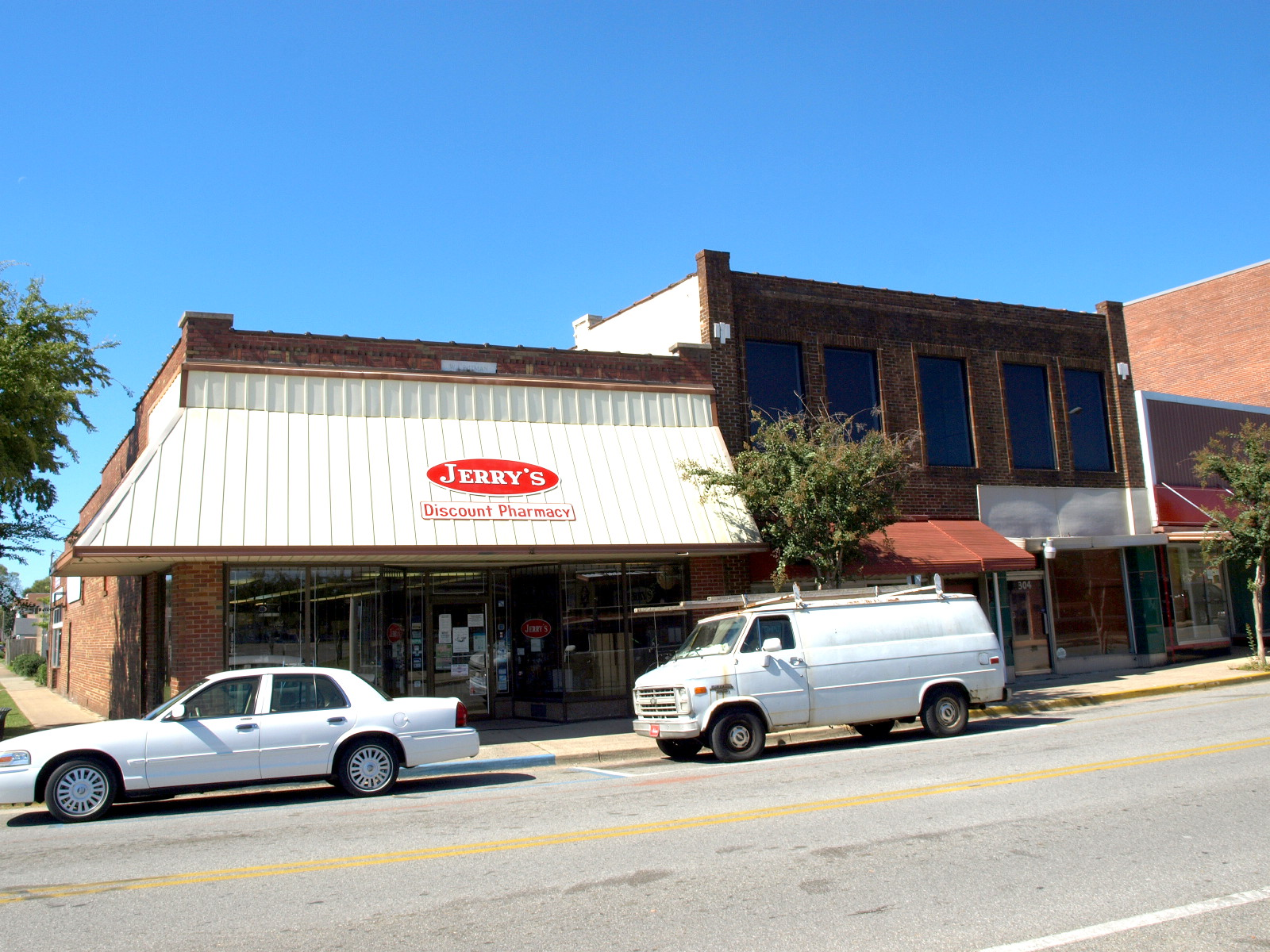
- Wall St & Sansom Ave, Alabama City, Gadsden, Oct 2014

- Location within the state of Alabama Alabama City (the United States)
- Coordinates: 34°01′20.4″N 86°02′43.9″W
- Country: United States
- State: Alabama
- County: Etowah
- Established: 1891
- Elevation: 551 ft (168 m)
- Time zone: UTC-6 (Central Time)
  - Summer (DST): UTC-5 (CDT)
- ZIP code: 35904
- Area code: 938
- GNIS feature ID: 0112955

Alabama City is a former city and now a neighborhood within the city of Gadsden in Etowah County, Alabama, United States. It was equidistant between Gadsden and Attalla, Alabama, approximately 2 1/2 miles west of downtown Gadsden.

== History ==
Founded by Captain James Madison Elliott, Jr. (1854-1914), it was incorporated by a special act of the state legislature in 1891. William Gardner was appointed the first mayor and the city was divided into 4 wards, represented by aldermen C.A. Clayton, C.F. Norris, R.V. Wilson and Abihu Christopher. At the time, it consisted of about 3,000 acres (roughly 5 square miles) between Little Wills Creek and Black Creek. A post office was established as well, and it had about 50 residents.

Captain Elliott's ambitious vision for his new city was to see both neighboring Gadsden and Attalla merging into Alabama City, with intentions of becoming the major industrial hub of Northeast Alabama.

In 1895, the city landed its first major factory, a cotton mill built by the Dwight Manufacturing Company of Chicopee, Massachusetts. Its second major factory, the Alabama Steel and Wire Company (later Gulf State Steel), was opened in 1902. Railroad lines also ran through the city, including the Southern Railroad, Nashville, Chattanooga and St. Louis Railroad and Louisville and Nashville Railroads. In 1912, a streetcar line was constructed by Elliott's company.

Inspired by Birmingham's 1910 merger that transformed it into a major city, in 1914, an effort to merge Alabama City into its smaller neighbor of Attalla failed. Its failure was due in part to the efforts of Gadsden leaders and also due to Captain Elliott's objections in that he did not want Attalla to "swallow" his city, but for it to "swallow" Attalla. Elliott died that year.

By 1915, a thriving commercial district had grown up around 7th Avenue, which became known as "Little Wall Street". A major fire in 1927 damaged or destroyed many structures along Wall Street and Meighan Avenue. The city hall and post office were among the casualties. Although the city was still growing and began to rebuild, it never would recover fully from the loss, especially as neighboring Gadsden flourished. The Depression would also compound the damage to the city, causing many businesses to close. Alabama City ultimately voted to merge into Gadsden on July 13, 1932.

== Demographics ==
=== Alabama City (1900-1930) ===
Historical population
| Census | Pop. | Note | %± |
|---|---|---|---|
| 1900 | 2,429 | | — |
| 1910 | 4,313 | | 77.6% |
| 1920 | 5,432 | | 25.9% |
| 1930 | 8,544 | | 57.3% |
U.S. Decennial Census

Alabama City first appeared on the 1900 U.S. Census as an incorporated city. It returned until 1930, before merging into neighboring Gadsden in 1932. It was the 15th largest city in Alabama in 1930.

=== Historic demographics ===
| Census Year | Population & Racial Majority (Note: Note about colors: With the exception of Hispanic, Pacific Islander, Other, and 2 or More Races, the colors depicted refer to those historically ascribed to them (White (White/No background); Black (Brown); Native American (Red); Asian (Yellow)) and are there to be easily identified on said chart. No racism or malice of intent is meant to be implied by their usage.) | State Place Rank | County Place Rank | White | Black |
|---|---|---|---|---|---|
| 1900 (Note: 1st year Alabama City reported on census) | 2,429 (-) (Note: (-)Indicates no immediate prior population figure or rank) (Note: Racial demographics not reported for places of less than 2,500 on 1900 census.) | 28th (-) | 2nd (-) | | |
| 1910 | 4,313 ↑ | 18th ↑ | 2nd X (Note: X Indicates no change in rank) | 4,256 ↑ 98.7% | 57 (-) 1.3% |
| 1920 | 5,432 ↑ | 16th (Note: Tied for 16th place with Phenix City) ↑ | 2nd X | 5,190 ↑ 95.5% | 242 ↑ 4.5% |
| 1930 | 8,544 ↑ | 15th ↑ | 2nd X | 8,071 ↑ 94.5% | 473 ↑ 5.5% |

== Alabama City Precinct (1900-1950) ==
Historical population
| Census | Pop. | Note | %± |
|---|---|---|---|
| 1900 | 2,429 | | — |
| 1910 | 5,663 | | 133.1% |
| 1920 | 7,121 | | 25.7% |
| 1930 | 10,958 | | 53.9% |
| 1940 | 12,585 | | 14.8% |
| 1950 | 17,915 | | 42.4% |
U.S. Decennial Census

The 29th precinct of Etowah County (1900-1950) also bore the name of Alabama City. Note that both the city and precinct population in 1900 was identical, but the precinct also included areas not within the city limits and reported a larger population figure beginning in 1910. In 1960, the precinct was merged, as part of a larger reorganization of counties, into the census division of Gadsden.

== Education ==
In the 1910s, Alabama City residents who wished to attend high school could choose between Etowah County High School in Attalla and Disque High School in Gadsden.

== Photo Gallery ==
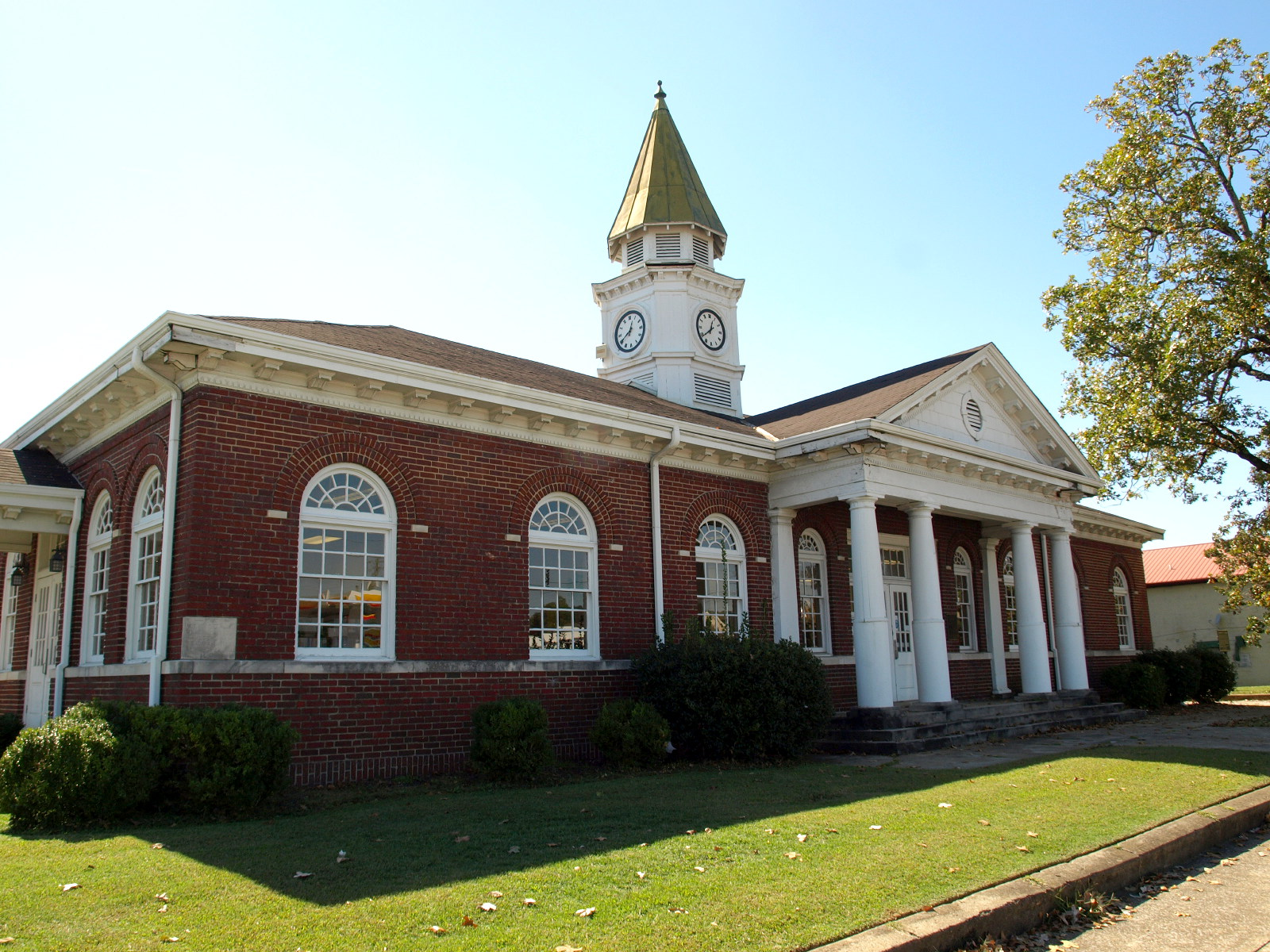
Hoyt Warsham Alabama City Branch Library, Oct 2014

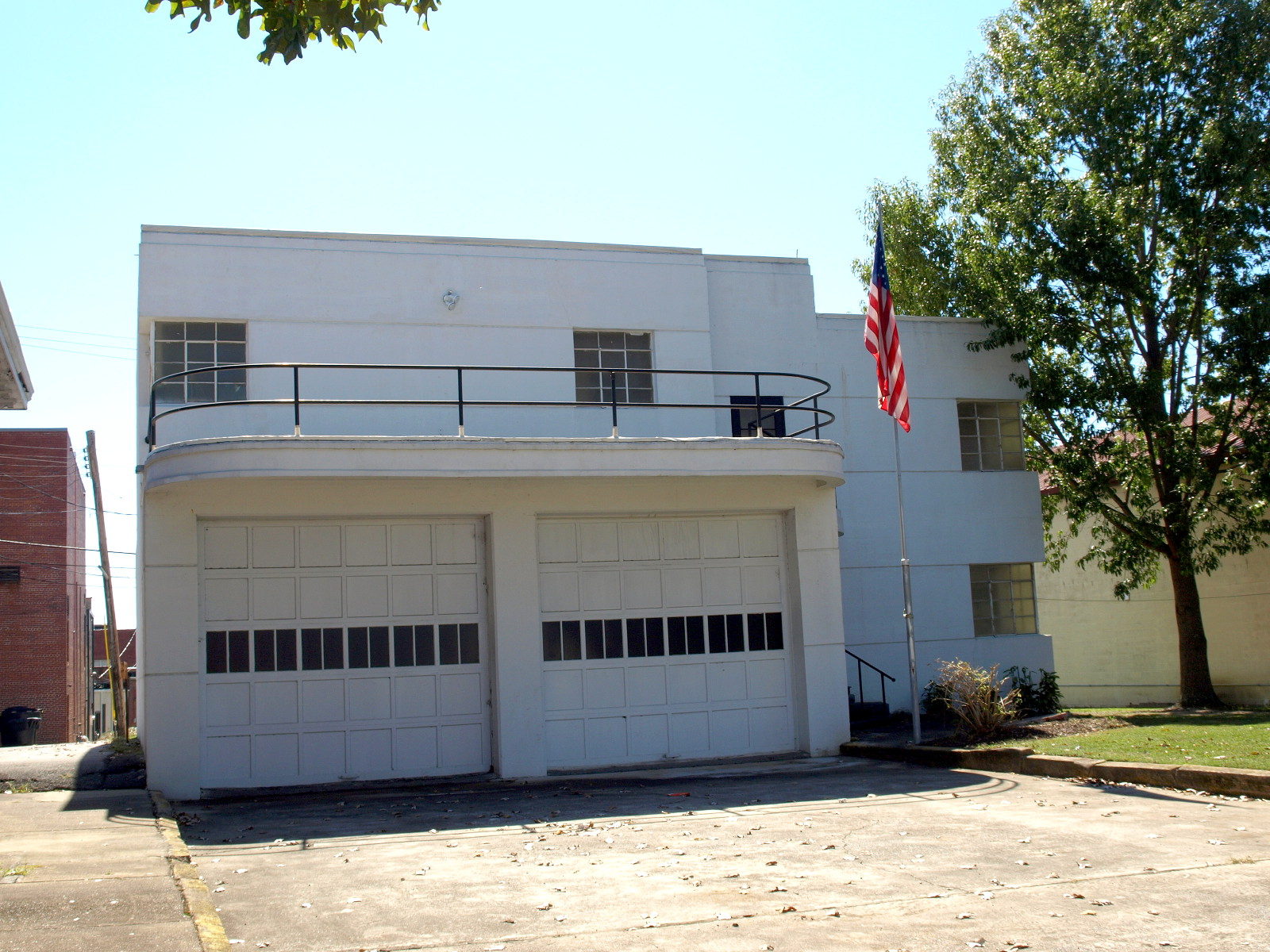
Old Alabama City Fire Station, Oct 2014

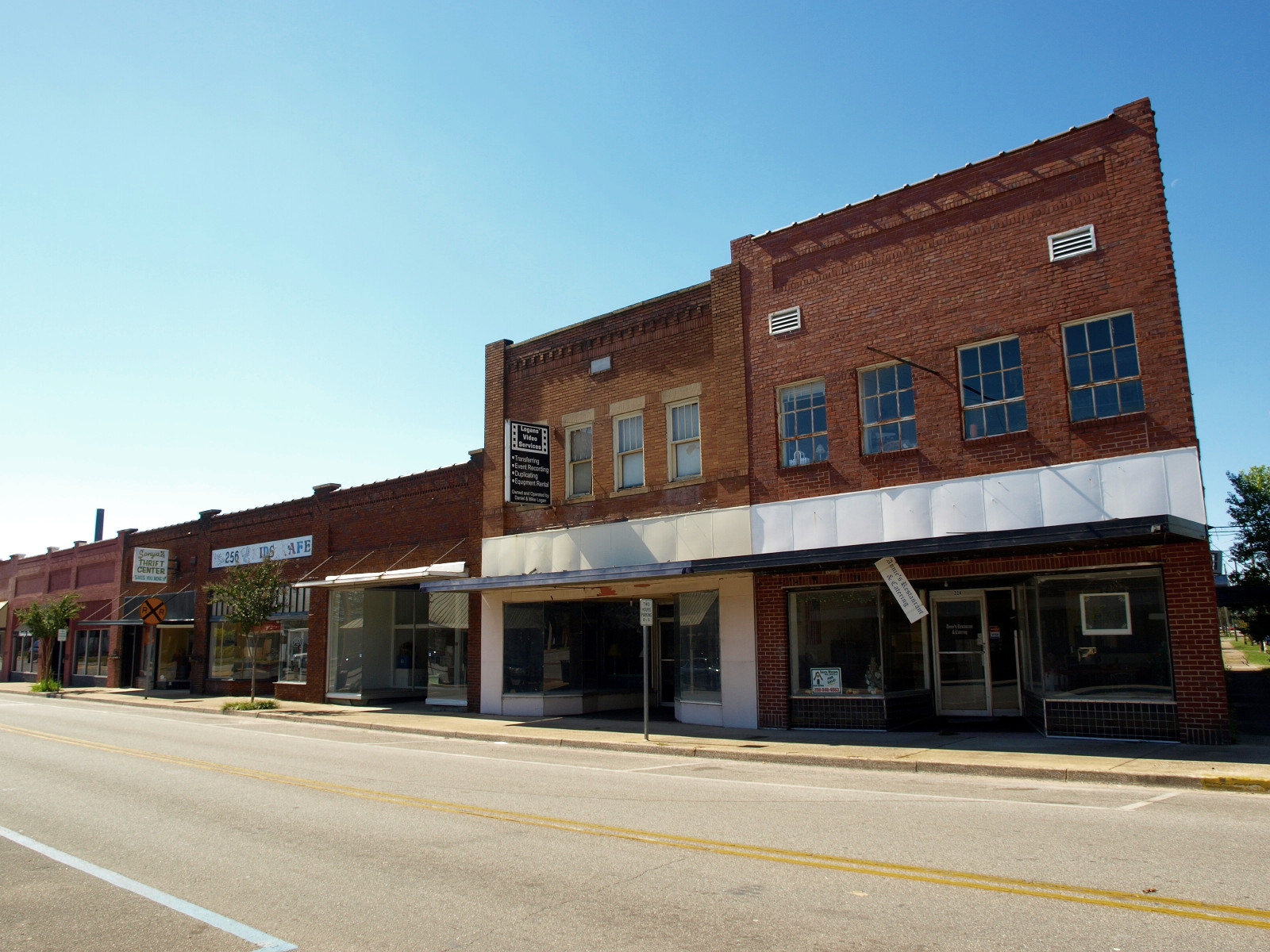
Wall Street, Alabama City, Gadsden, Oct 2014

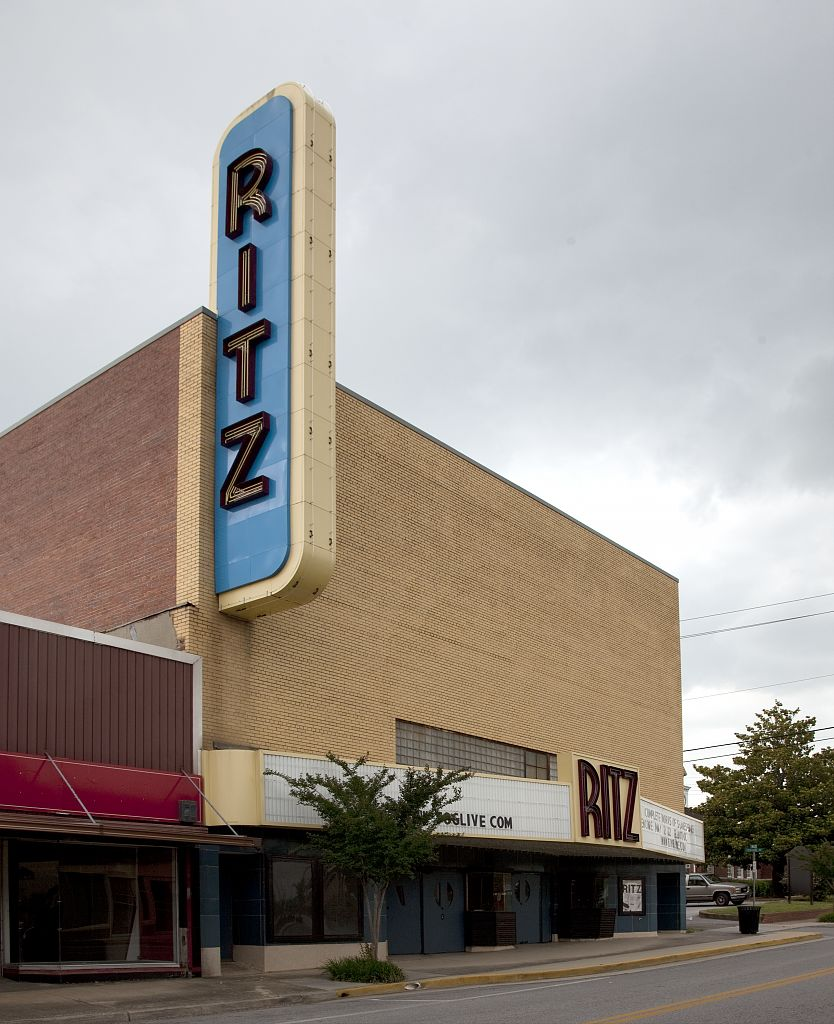
Ritz Theatre, 310 Wall Street, Alabama City, Gadsden, 2010

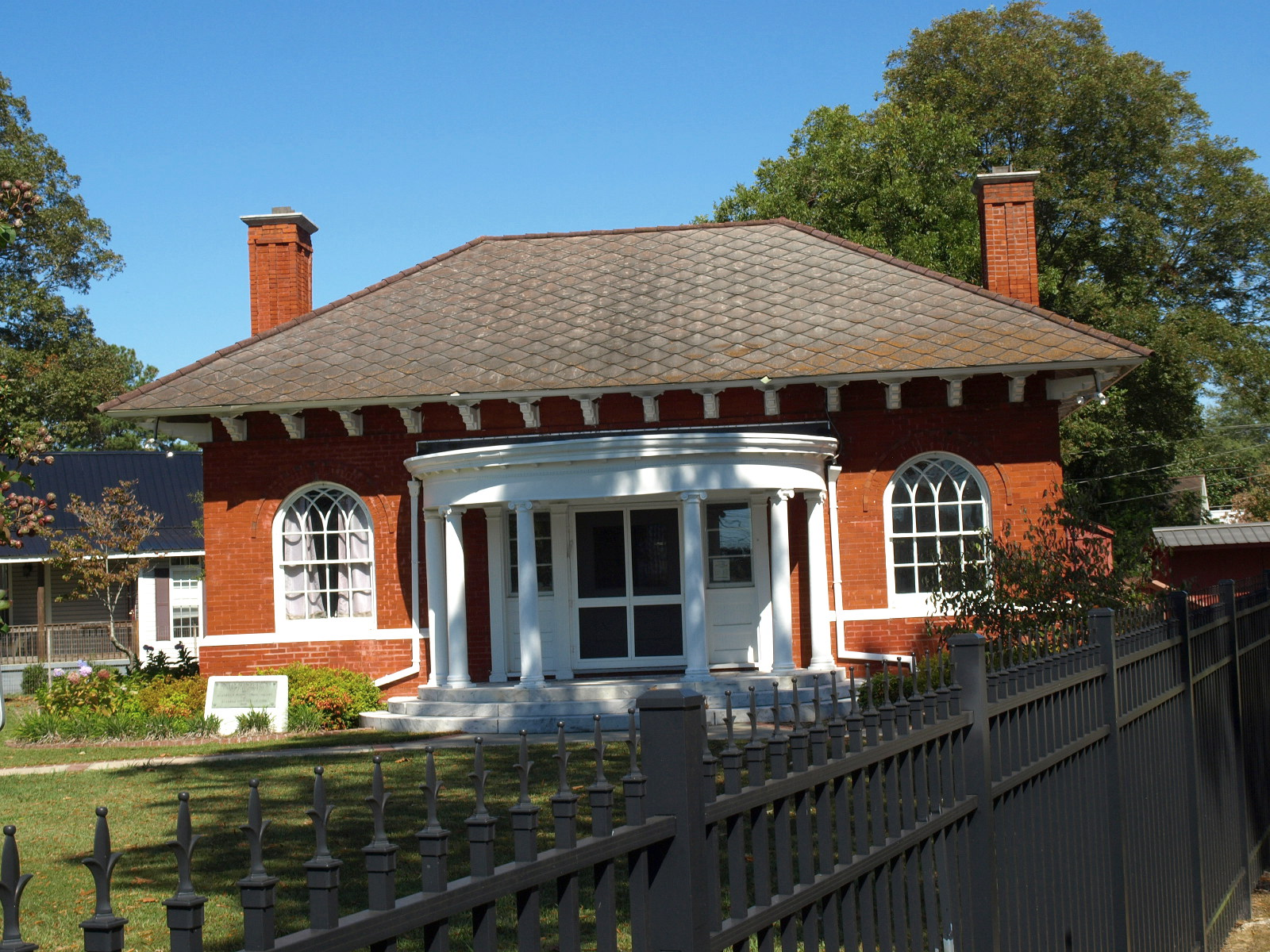
The Howard Gardner Nichols Memorial Library (Alabama City Library), 2014
