= Gadsden Downtown Historic District =

Historic district in Alabama, United States

- U.S. National Register of Historic Places
- U.S. Historic district
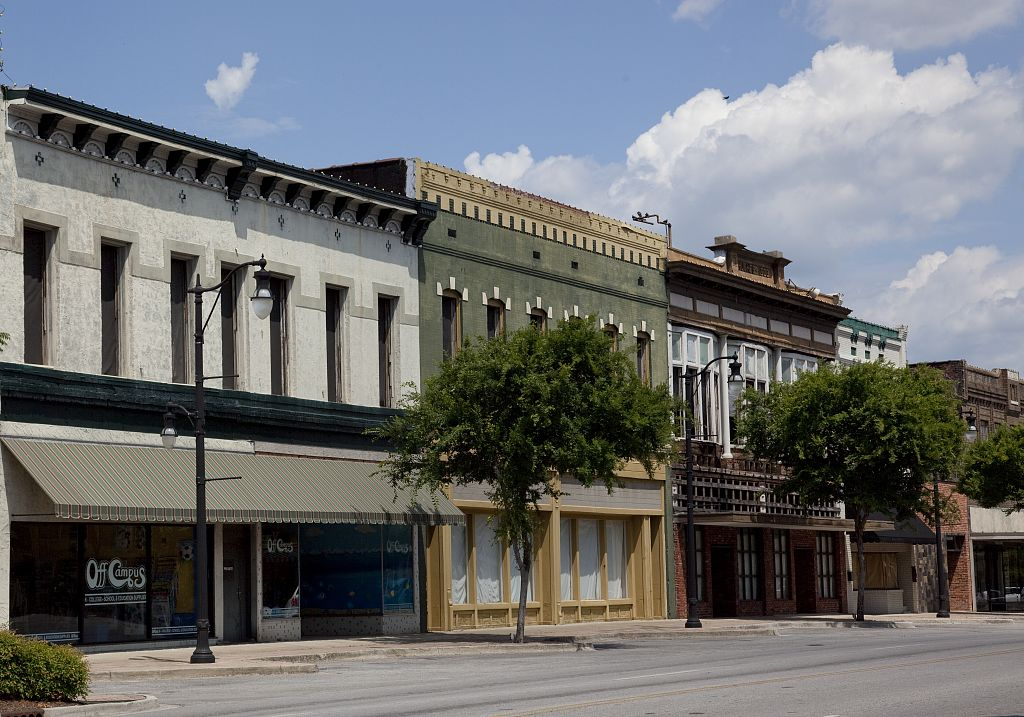
- Buildings on Broad Street in 2010

- Location within Alabama Location within the United States
- Location: Along Broad St., roughly bounded by Locust, 3rd, S. 5th, Chestnut, and 7th Sts., Gadsden, Alabama
- Coordinates: 34°0′49″N 86°0′17″W
- Area: 43 acres (17 ha)
- Built: 1883
- Architectural style: Gothic, Italianate, Classical Revival
- NRHP reference No.: 97001165
- Added to NRHP: September 26, 1997

The Gadsden Downtown Historic District is a historic district in Gadsden, Alabama, United States. The district represents the growth of the town through its industrial heyday from the late 1870s to the late 1940s. The earliest buildings in the district include examples of highly decorated Italianate styles, including the 1904 Gadsden Times-News Building. Early 20th-century buildings began showing less applied decoration, instead drawing visual variety from the brickwork itself. Later buildings begin to incorporate modern materials in their construction, including concrete, decorative glass, and enameled panels. There are three significant churches in the district that represent revivalist architectural styles:the Gothic Revival First Methodist Church (built 1894), the Neoclassical First Baptist Church (built 1926), and the Romanesque St. James Catholic Church (built 1927). The Post Office and Courthouse, built in 1910, exhibits Italian Renaissance Revival style. The district was listed on the National Register of Historic Places in 1997.
