= Attalla Downtown Historic District =

Historic district in Alabama, United States

- U.S. National Register of Historic Places
- U.S. Historic district
- Alabama Register of Landmarks and Heritage
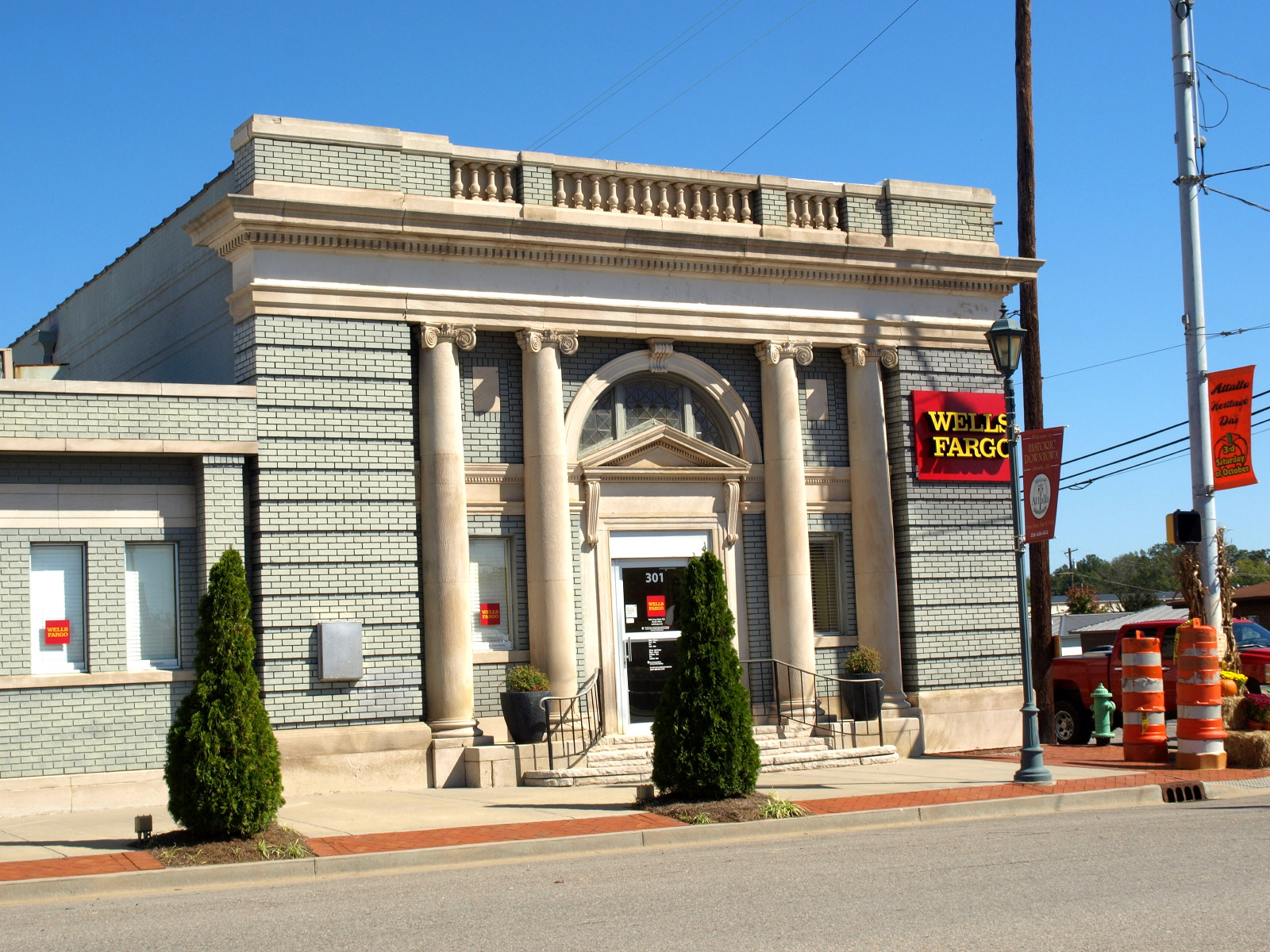
- The Bank of Attalla in October 2014

- Location within Alabama Location within the United States
- Location: 3rd St. N., 4th St. N. & 5th Ave. S., Attalla, Alabama
- Coordinates: 34°1′21″N 86°5′22″W
- Area: 11 acres (4.5 ha)
- NRHP reference No.: 13000893

Significant dates
- Added to NRHP: December 11, 2013
- Designated ARLH: May 19, 2011

The Attalla Downtown Historic District is a historic district in Attalla, Alabama, United States. The city was founded in 1870 along the Alabama and Chattanooga Railroad. It quickly developed into a major iron ore export hub. After fires in 1887 and 1891, most of the frame buildings downtown were replaced with brick structures. The oldest buildings in the district, which date from the 1880s and 1890s, are built in Folk Victorian styles, with corbelled cornices and other decorative elements. Later buildings are in more plain Commercial Brick styles, while others were built in more academic styles, including the Art Moderne Etowah Theatre (today known as the Country Music Opera House) and the Colonial Revival Post Office building. The district was listed on the Alabama Register of Landmarks and Heritage in 2011 and the National Register of Historic Places in 2013.
