= B. L. Noojin =

American sports coach, educator, politician, and businessman (1885–1950)

Biographical details
- Born: August 10, 1885; Attalla, Alabama, U.S.
- Died: September 7, 1950 (aged 65); Gadsden, Alabama, U.S.

Playing career

Baseball
- c. 1905: Alabama
- 1908: Charlotte Hornets
- 1908–1910: Greenville Spinners
- 1911: Chattanooga Lookouts
- 1911: Augusta Tourists/Orphans
- 1911: Columbia Comers
- 1912: Greenville Spinners
- 1913: Asheville Mountaineers
- Position: Outfielder

Coaching career (HC unless noted)

Football
- 1910: Blountsville Agricultural
- 1911: Albertville Agricultural
- 1912–1914: Howard (AL)
- 1915: Alabama (assistant)

Basketball
- 1917–1918: Alabama

Baseball
- 1913–1915: Howard (AL)
- 1916–1919: Alabama

Administrative career (AD unless noted)
- 1912–1915: Howard (AL)
- 1916–1919: Alabama

Head coaching record
- Overall: 10–13–2 (football); 2–5 (basketball); 86–31 (basketball)

Accomplishments and honors

Championships
- Baseball; 4 SIAA (1916–1919)

Balpha Lonnie Noojin (August 10, 1885 – September 7, 1950) was an American college sports coach and administrator, educator, Minor League Baseball player, politician, and businessman. He was the athletic director at Howard College—now known as Samford University—in Birmingham, Alabama from 1912 to 1915 and at the University of Alabama from 1916 to 1919.

== Early life, education, and playing career ==
Noojin was born on August 10, 1885, in Attalla, Alabama. He completed his education at the University of Alabama, earning a Bachelor of Science degree in 1908. At Alabama, Noojin was associate editor of the student newspaper and annual and a member of the Alabama Crimson Tide baseball team. Noojin was elected captain of the baseball team in 1907. He was also member of the Alpha Kappa chapter of Phi Kappa Sigma social fraternity.

In 1910, after playing for the Greenville Spinners of the Carolina Association, Noojin was drafted by the Cincinnati Reds of the National League.

== Coaching and teaching career ==
Noojin taught at the agricultural schools in Blountsville and Albertville, Alabama. He coached football at Ninth District Agricultural School, in Blountsville, in 1910, and at the Seventh District Agricultural School, in Albertville, in 1911. Noojin met Willie Lucille McNaron in Albertville. The two were married in 1916.

In 1912, Noojin was appointed athletic director at Howard College—now known as Samford University—in Birmingham, Alabama. He was the head football coach at Howard from 1912 to 1914, compiling a record of 10–13–2 in three seasons.

In early 1915, Noojin was hired as head baseball coach and assistant football coach at his alma mater, the University of Alabama, for the following academic year.

Noojin was the head coach of the Alabama Crimson Tide baseball team for four seasons, from 1916 to 1919, compiling a record of 54–19 and leading his squads to four consecutive Southern Intercollegiate Athletic Association (SIAA) titles. He coached the Alabama men's basketball team for a single season, in 1917–18, to a 2–5 record. Noojin was to be head coach for the 1918 season prior to its cancellation due to the effects of World War I. At Alabama, he was also an instructor of English, French, Spanish, physics, and chemistry.

== Business career ==
In 1919, Noojin resigned from the University of Alabama to join his brother in the hardware business. The Noojin brothers operated a hardware store until 1923, when they founded the Noojin Supply Company. Three years later, Noojin bought his brother's interest and managed the company on his own. Noojin became active in a number of civic activities. He was on the board of directors of the American National Bank of Gadsden, Alabama Power Company and the Gadsden Chamber of Commerce. Noojin was the president of the National Alumni Association and member of the Board of Trustees of The University of Alabama. In 1926, he had a house built in Gadsden, now the Noojin House and Bellevue-Mineral Springs Hotel Site.

== Politics ==
Noojin was also an active politician, serving on the Republican State Committee and the Republican National Convention.

- Delegate to Republican National Convention from Alabama, 1924 (alternate), 1932, 1940, 1944, 1948
- Member, Republican National Committee from Alabama, 1940–1943
- Chairman, Alabama Republican Party, 1928–1931

== Death and honors ==
Noojin died on September 7, 1950, at a hospital in Gadsden, Alabama, following an illness lasting several months. He was inducted into the Alabama Business Hall of Fame in 1979.

== Head coaching record ==
=== Football ===
Year	Team	Overall	Conference	Standing	Bowl/playoffs
Howard Baptists (Southern Intercollegiate Athletic Association) (1912)
1912	Howard	1–7	0–4	T–19th	
Howard Baptists (Independent) (1913–1914)
1913	Howard	5–3–1			
1914	Howard	4–3–1			
Howard:		10–13–2	0–4		
Total:		10–13–2			

== See also ==
- Noojin House and Bellevue-Mineral Springs Hotel Site
