= Tyrone Nix =

American football player and coach (born 1972)

Current position
- Title: Defensive coordinator
- Team: Tarleton State
- Conference: WAC

Biographical details
- Born: September 30, 1972 (age 54); Attalla, Alabama, U.S.

Playing career
- 1990–1993: Southern Miss
- Position: Linebacker

Coaching career (HC unless noted)
- 1995: Southern Miss (DT)
- 1996–1999: Southern Miss (OLB)
- 2000: Southern Miss (DB)
- 2001–2004: Southern Miss (DC/ILB)
- 2005: South Carolina (Co-DC/DL)
- 2006–2007: South Carolina (DC/ILB)
- 2008–2009: Ole Miss (DC/LB)
- 2010–2011: Ole Miss (AHC/DC/LB)
- 2012–2014: Middle Tennessee (co-DC/LB)
- 2015–2016: Middle Tennessee (DC/LB)
- 2017: Texas A&M (defensive analyst)
- 2018: Virginia Tech (S)
- 2019: Ole Miss (OLB)
- 2020: UTSA (DC/LB)
- 2022–present: Tarleton (DC)

Tyrone Nix (born September 30, 1972) is an American football coach who currently serves as defensive coordinator for the Tarleton State Texans. Nix is the former defensive coordinator for Middle Tennessee, Ole Miss, South Carolina, and Southern Miss. He is the brother of Derrick Nix, a former Southern Miss star and the current wide receivers coach at Alabama.

== Playing career ==
Nix was a former starting linebacker. Following high school at Etowah High School in Attalla, Alabama, he went to the University of Southern Mississippi and played linebacker from 1990 through 1993. He was named Golden Eagle team captain in 1993. As a freshman, Nix was one of three freshmen to play in the 1990 All-American Bowl. He was also named to the All-South team and National Independent team as both a junior and a senior. In the year 1991, Nix became a member of Phi Beta Sigma fraternity through the Theta Eta chapter at the University of Southern Mississippi.

== Coaching career ==
=== Southern Miss ===
In 2001, Nix became the defensive coordinator at Southern Miss at the age of 29, making him the youngest coordinator in Division I-A. By 2003 he was a finalist for the Broyles Award, which recognizes the nation’s top assistant coaches.

His impact as a defensive coordinator was immediately felt as he led the 2001 Golden Eagle defense, which had lost 7 starters from the previous season, to rankings of 8th in the nation in scoring defense and 11th in the nation in total defense.

In his first three years as defensive coordinator at USM, Coach Nix’s defenses stayed in the top 15 nationally in scoring defense.

=== South Carolina ===
Coach Nix began his tenure at South Carolina in 2005 as co-defensive coordinator, sharing the responsibility with his long-time colleague John Thompson. Near the end of that season, impressed by Coach Nix’s coaching prowess, Head Coach Steve Spurrier promoted him to sole defensive coordinator and assistant head coach. Prior to his promotion, the Gamecocks were giving up over 27 points per game. After the promotion, and under Coach Nix’s sole guidance, the USC defense held opponents to just 17 points per game and had wins over the University of Florida and the University of Tennessee which hadn't happened in over 20 years.

=== Ole Miss ===
On December 11, 2007, Nix accepted the job as defensive coordinator at the University of Mississippi (Ole Miss), to serve under new Ole Miss head coach Houston Nutt.

During the 2008 season, Nix had Ole Miss defense ranked among the national leaders in points per game (17.8, 14th in FBS,) yards per game (204.8, 16th in FBS,) and ranked 5th nationally in total rushing yards (1020.) The 2008 defense included firth team All-American DT Peria Jerry and third team DE Greg Hardy. The season was capped off with a 47-34 win over Texas Tech in the Cotton Bowl and an 8-4 record.

Following the 2009 season, Houston Nutt promoted Nix to the role of assistant head coach after being nominated for the Frank Broyles Award. Upon the hiring of Hugh Freeze as head coach of the Ole Miss Rebels on December 6, 2011, after Nutt was fired, Nix was dismissed as well.

=== Middle Tennessee ===
After interviewing with the Oklahoma Sooners, Nix was named co-defensive coordinator at Middle Tennessee State on February 22, 2012 under Rick Stockstill. Nix was fired December 28, 2016.

=== Texas A&M ===
Nix served as the senior defensive analyst for the Aggies in the 2017 season.

=== UTSA ===
On Feb. 3, 2020, Nix was named defensive coordinator and linebackers coach for the UTSA Roadrunners. UTSA placed him on leave on November 14 pending the results of an unspecified internal investigation. On February 7, 2021 it was reported Nix would not be retained following an investigation into violating university policy on inappropriate sexual conduct, though the University reinstated Nix on a 12 month notice on condition that he take a misconduct course upon his return.
