= Derrick Nix (American football) =

American football coach (born 1980)

Current position
- Title: Wide receivers coach
- Team: Alabama
- Conference: SEC

Biographical details
- Born: February 22, 1980 (age 46); Attalla, Alabama, U.S.

Playing career
- 1998–2002: Southern Miss
- Position: Running back

Coaching career (HC unless noted)
- 2003: Southern Miss (GA)
- 2004–2005: Southern Miss (TE)
- 2006–2007: Southern Miss (RB)
- 2008–2019: Ole Miss (RB)
- 2020–2022: Ole Miss (WR)
- 2023: Ole Miss (AHC/WR)
- 2024–2025: Auburn (OC/RB)
- 2026–present: Alabama (WR)

Accomplishments and honors

Awards
- Conference USA Freshman of the Year (1998); 2× first team All-CUSA (1999, 2002); Second team All-CUSA (1998)

Derrick Nix (born February 22, 1980) is an American football coach and former player who is the wide receivers coach at Alabama. He played college football at Southern Miss where he was the only player in Conference USA history to rush for over 1,000 yards in three seasons.

== Early years ==
Nix grew up in Attalla, Alabama. His father was a pastor and his older brother Tyrone played linebacker at Southern Miss before becoming a coach. Nix attended Etowa High School where he was an all county selection as a senior. Nix was recruited by Alabama, Auburn, Georgia and Florida as a linebacker but he instead decided to commit to the University of Southern Mississippi as he wanted to play running back and his brother worked as an assistant coach at the school.

== College career ==
As a freshman Nix ran for 1,180 yards and 9 touchdowns and was named a freshman All-American and the Conference USA freshman of the year. The following year in 1999 he ran for 1,054 yards while earning all-conference honors, helping the Golden Eagles win their second straight Conference USA title and finish ranked #14 in the AP Poll, the highest finish in school history. Nix missed most of the 2000 and 2001 seasons due to a kidney disease he developed after taking medication to recover from an ankle injury. He returned to the field as a senior in 2002 where ran for 1,194 yards and 11 touchdowns, making him the only player in Conference USA history to rush for 1,000 yards in three seasons. Nix was projected by NFL scouts as likely being a second or third round draft pick however he was forced to quit football prior to the Golden Eagles bowl game due to his kidney disease worsening and becoming life-threatening. He finished just 12 yards away from the program rushing record. Nix received a kidney transplant from his brother Marcus in 2003 and later sued Pfizer. and Merck & Co, the makers of the anti-inflammation drugs that caused his kidney disease. The lawsuit was settled out of court.

Nix was named to the Conference USA team of the decade in 2006 and was inducted into the University of Southern Mississippi Alumni Association Sports Hall of Fame in 2013.

== Coaching career ==
Nix began his coaching career in 2003 as a graduate assistant at Southern Miss under Jeff Bower. He was promoted to tight ends coach in 2004 and running backs coach in 2006. In 2008 he was named the running backs coach at Ole Miss, a position he would hold for twelve years. Upon the hiring of Lane Kiffin in 2020, Nix became the Rebels wide receiver coach where he coached All-American Elijah Moore. In 2023 he was promoted to the team's associate head coach. In 2024 he left Ole Miss after 16 years to become the offensive coordinator at Auburn under Hugh Freeze. Derrick Nix was inducted into Mississippi Sports Hall of Fame in August 2025. Nix called it 'a tremendous honor'. The fifth all-time leading rusher in Southern Miss history, Nix overcame a life-threatening kidney illness that ended his playing career to become one of the SEC's top assistant coaches over the past two decades.

== Personal life ==
Nix's older brother Tyrone Nix has served as the defensive coordinator at South Carolina and Ole Miss and is currently the defensive coordinator at Tarleton State.
