= Charles Gunn House =

Historic house in Alabama, United States

- U.S. National Register of Historic Places
- Alabama Register of Landmarks and Heritage
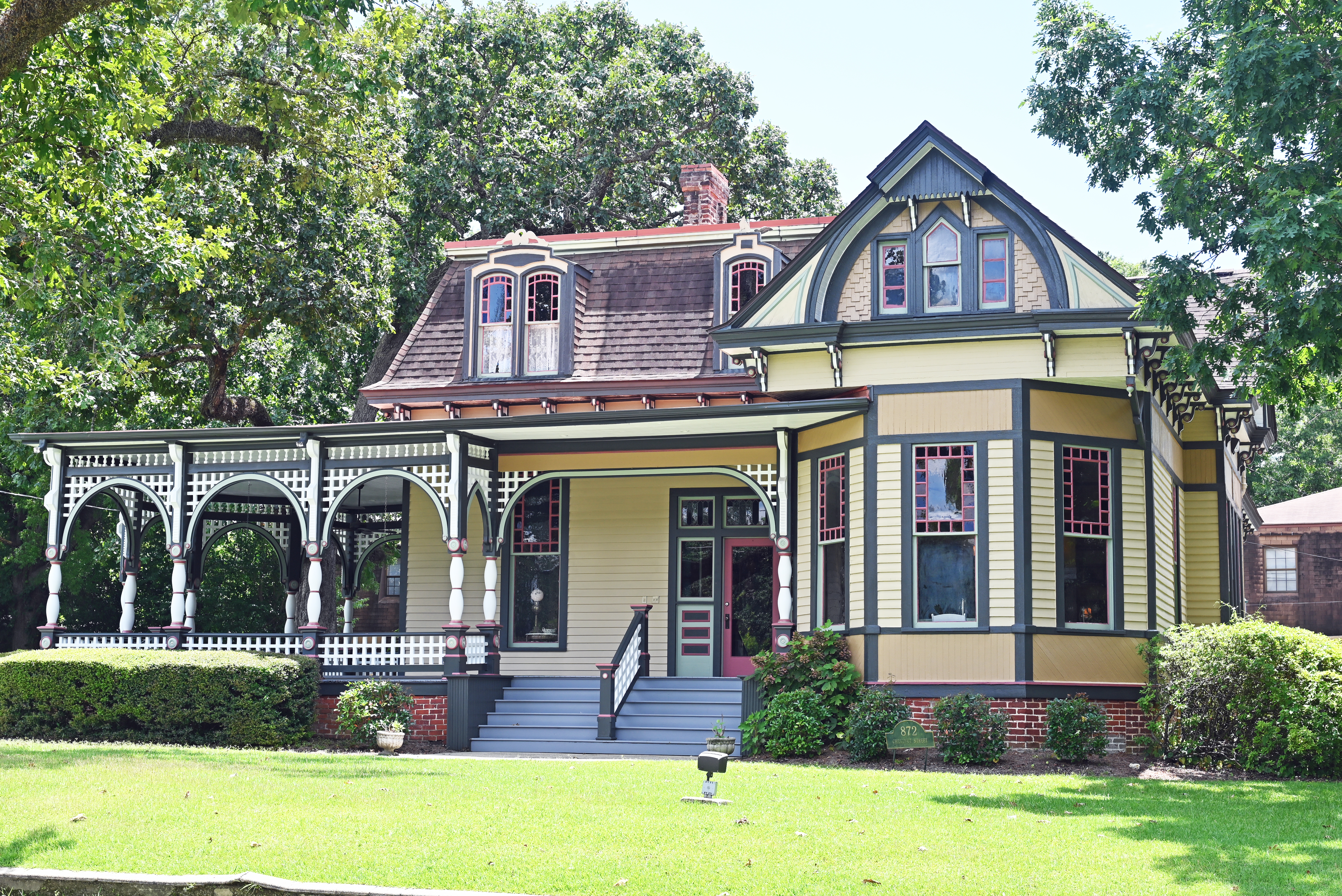
- The house in July 2026

- Location within Alabama Location within the United States
- Location: 872 Chestnut St., Gadsden, Alabama
- Coordinates: 34°0′50″N 86°0′54″W
- Area: less than one acre
- Built: 1886
- Architectural style: Late Victorian
- NRHP reference No.: 93000052

Significant dates
- Added to NRHP: February 19, 1993
- Designated ARLH: April 11, 1984

The Charles Gunn House (also known as the Bellenger Home) is a historic residence in Gadsden, Alabama, United States. The house was built in 1886 by Edward Tracy Hollingsworth, a local merchant and banker. Charles Logan Gunn, a dentist, purchased the house in 1901. His daughter, Carolyn Gunn Bellenger, inherited the house and willed it to the city upon her death in 1990. The city restored the house and now rents it for meetings and events.

The highly decorated Victorian house has a mansard roof with projecting gable atop a bay window on the north and east sides. The façade also features a wraparound porch with latticework balustrade. The house was listed on the Alabama Register of Landmarks and Heritage in 1984 and the National Register of Historic Places in 1993.
