= Noojin House and Bellevue-Mineral Springs Hotel Site =

Historic house in Gadsden, Alabama, U.S.

- Noojin House
- U.S. National Register of Historic Places
- Alabama Register of Landmarks and Heritage
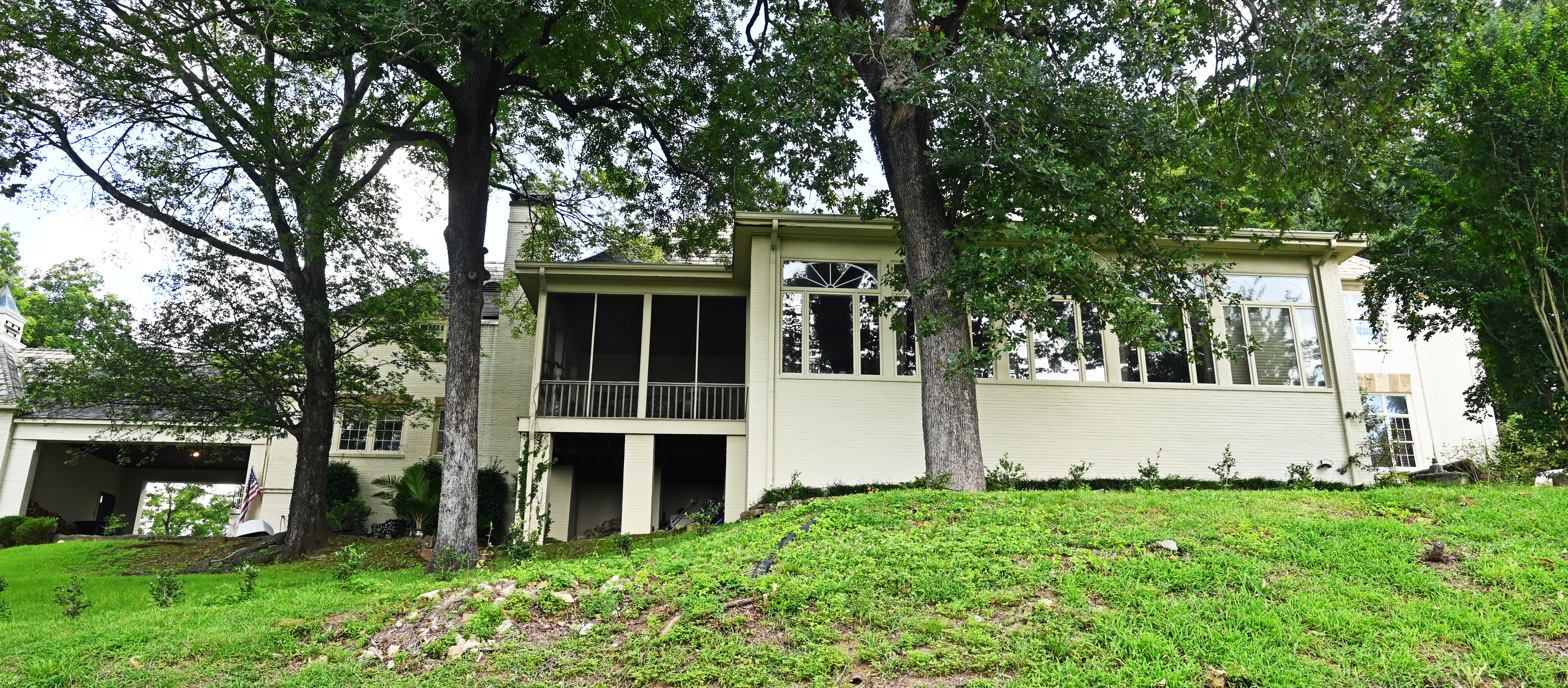
- Back side of the house, which has view overlooking Gadsden
- Interactive map of Noojin House
- Location: 326 Bellevue Dr., Gadsden, Alabama
- Coordinates: 34°01′49″N 86°01′16″W
- Built: 1926
- NRHP reference No.: 100008433

Significant dates
- Added to NRHP: June 27, 2023
- Designated ARLH: May 22, 2008

The Noojin House (also known as the Noojin–Robinson House, the Bellevue-Mineral Springs Hotel Site, and the Jones Female College Site), named for Alabama coach and politician B. L. Noojin, is a historic house in Gadsden, Alabama, United States. The house was built in 1926 and substantially renovated and expanded in 1940–41 in French Eclectic style. The two-story three-bay original façade has a centered entrance covered by a copper awning. To the left (west) of the entrance is a two-story arched window. The recessed 1940s one-and-a-half-story addition is further to the left, with a porch under a gable roof with three dormers flanked by a porte-cochère connecting to a garage. A 1980s addition enclosed the rear porch into a grand room with views of the city and the Coosa River.

Also on the property are the ruins of a building that housed the Bellevue Hotel from 1889 to 1895, the Jones Female College from 1895 to 1897, and the Mineral Spring Hotel from 1901 to 1912. After the building burned in 1912, the site was still used as a community gathering site until the house was built in 1926. The foundation and other stone and brick walls remain; four stone columns along the house's driveway are believed to be constructed from the hotel's rubble.

The house was listed on the Alabama Register of Landmarks and Heritage in 2008 and the National Register of Historic Places in 2023.
