= United States Post Office (Attalla, Alabama) =

Historic US post office

- U.S. Post Office
- U.S. National Register of Historic Places
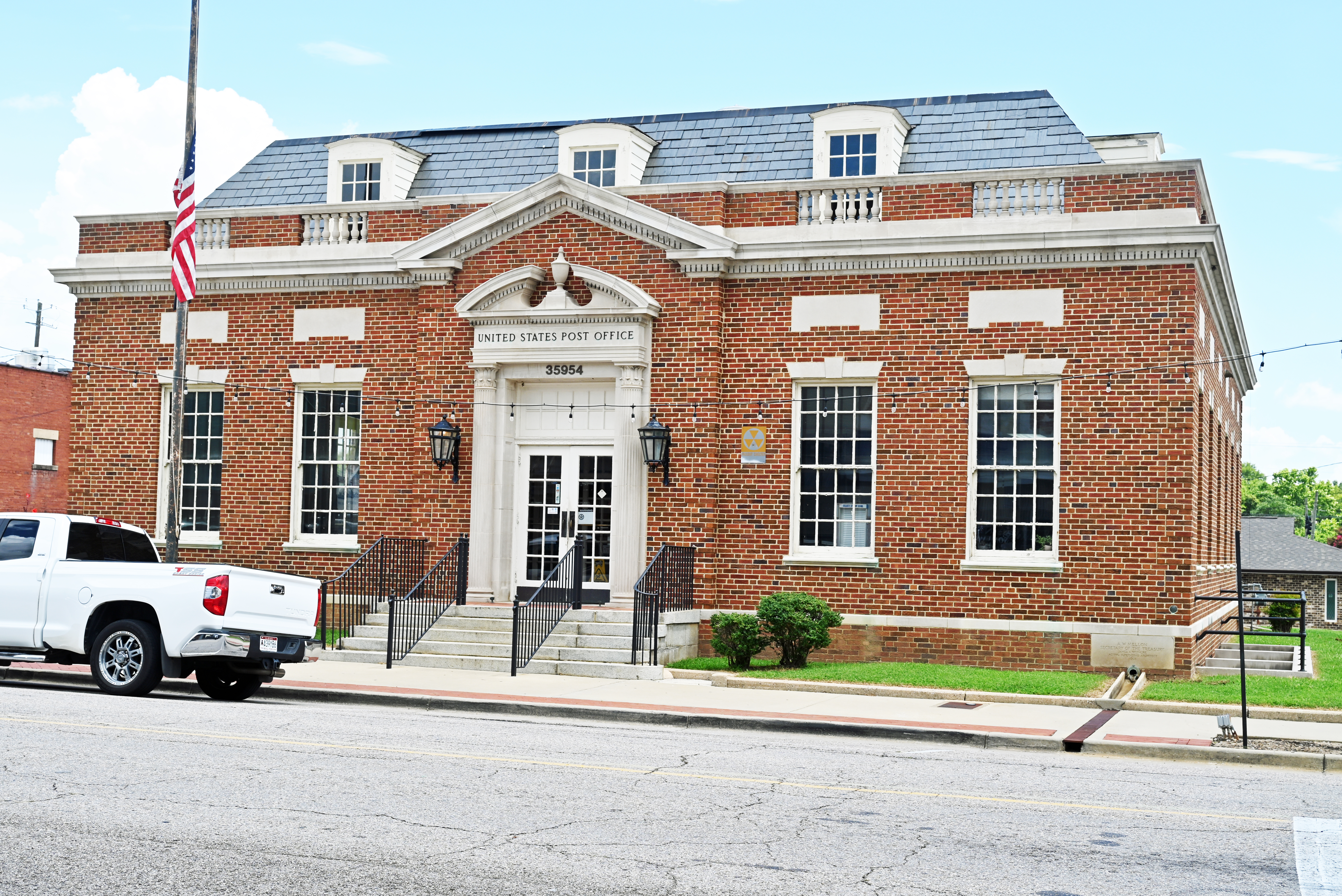

- Location within Alabama Location within the United States
- Location: 401 4th St. NW, Attalla, Alabama
- Coordinates: 34°1′19″N 86°5′25″W
- Area: 0.4 acres (0.16 ha)
- Built: 1931
- Architect: Adams Construction Co.
- Architectural style: Federal
- NRHP reference No.: 83002968
- Added to NRHP: June 21, 1983

The United States Post Office in Attalla, Alabama, United States, was built in 1931. It was listed on the National Register of Historic Places in 1983.

== See also ==
- List of United States post offices
