= Alabama City Wall Street Historic District =

Historic district in Alabama, United States

- U.S. National Register of Historic Places
- U.S. Historic district
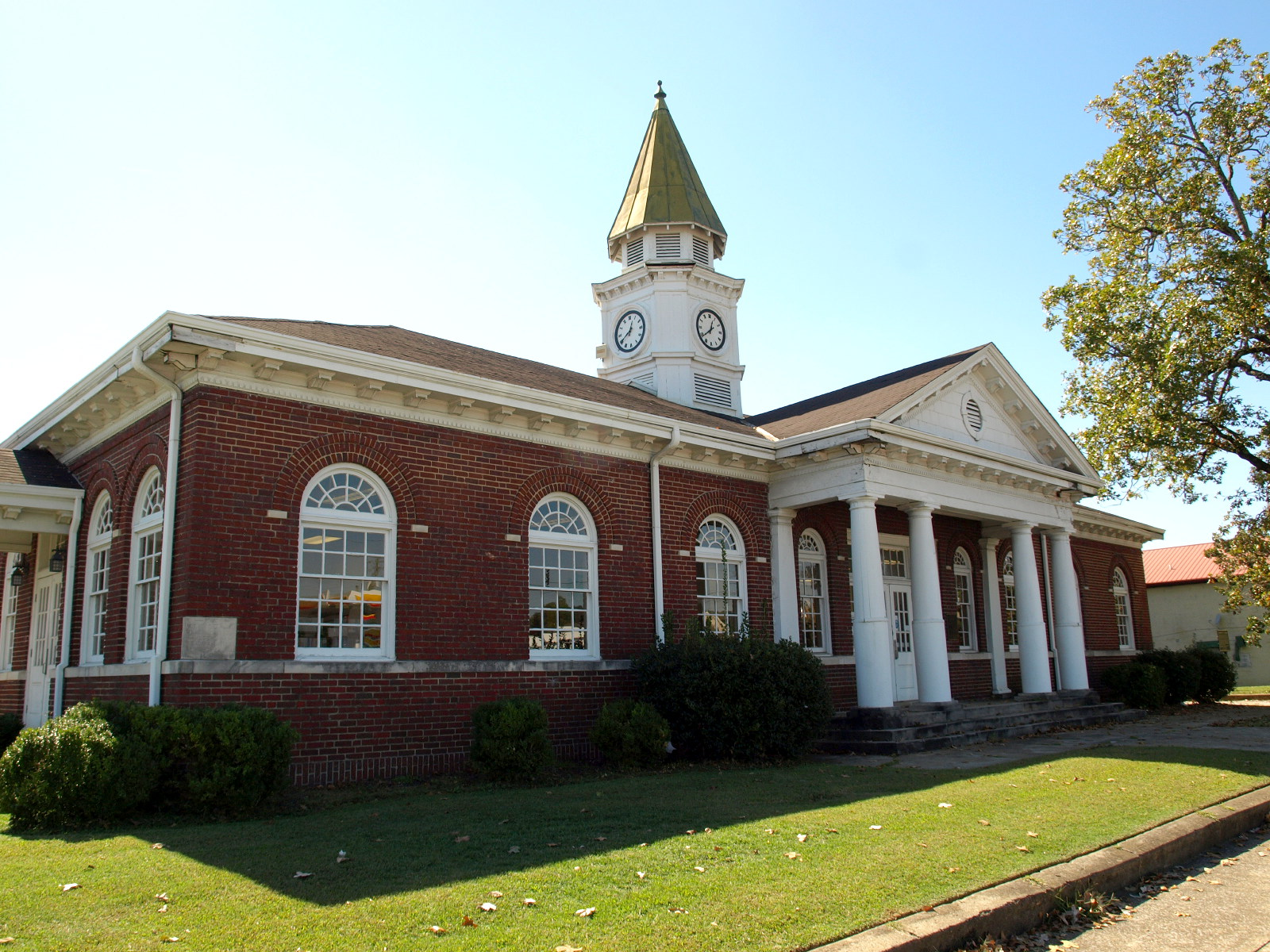
- The Hoyt Warsham Library in October 2014

- Location within Alabama Location within the United States
- Location: Roughly along Wall St., from Norris Ave. to Meighan Blvd., Gadsden, Alabama
- Coordinates: 34°1′14″N 86°2′44″W
- Area: 10 acres (4.0 ha)
- NRHP reference No.: 02000484
- Added to NRHP: May 16, 2002

The Alabama City Wall Street Historic District is a historic district in Gadsden, Alabama, United States. Wall Street was the main commercial street in the town of Alabama City. The city was founded in 1891 halfway between Gadsden and Attalla, with intentions of becoming the major industrial hub of Northeast Alabama. In 1895 the town landed its first major concern, a cotton mill built by the Dwight Manufacturing Company of Chicopee, Massachusetts. Its second major factory, the Alabama Steel and Wire Company, was opened in 1902. By 1915, a thriving commercial district had grown up around 7th Avenue, which became known as "Little Wall Street". A fire in 1927 damaged or destroyed many structures along Wall Street and Meighan Avenue. The city would never recover from the loss, especially as neighboring Gadsden flourished; Alabama City voted to merge into Gadsden in 1932. The architecture of the district represent the changing commercial styles of the 1910s through the 1930s. Most are constructed in simple, brick styles with parapet roofs, some with more decorative brickwork. Art Deco-influenced features such as terra cotta coping and glass tile accents are present on later buildings. Other notable buildings are an Art Deco fire station (built 1936) and the Classical Revival library (built 1938). The district was listed on the National Register of Historic Places in 2002.
