= Howard Gardner Nichols Memorial Library =

- Alabama City Library
- U.S. National Register of Historic Places
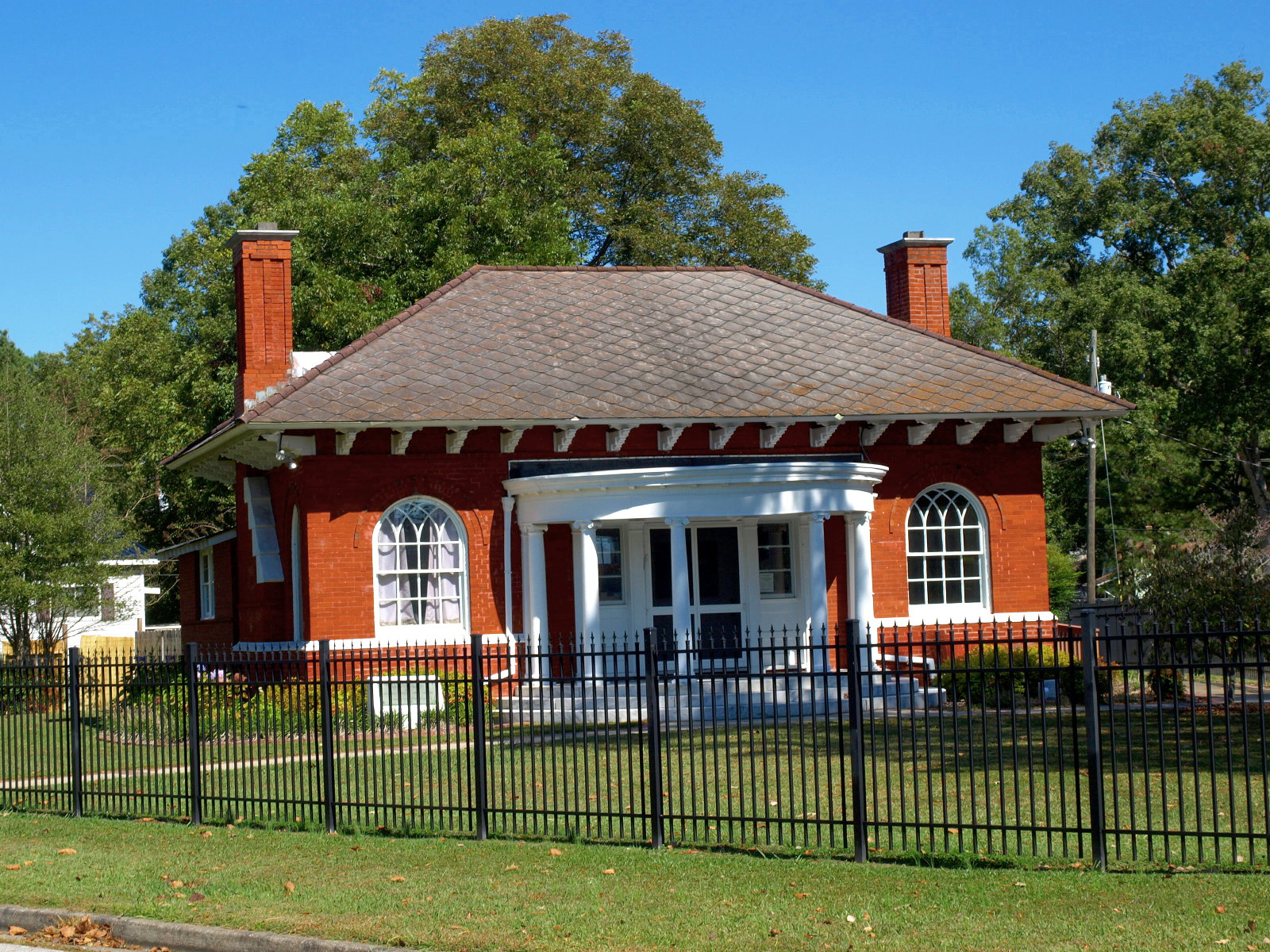
- The library in October 2014

- Location within Alabama Location within the United States
- Location: Corner of Cabot and Dwight avenues, Gadsden, Alabama
- Coordinates: 34°1′32″N 86°2′38″W
- Area: less than one acre
- Built: 1902
- Architectural style: Classical Revival, Late Victorian
- NRHP reference No.: 74000410
- Added to NRHP: December 27, 1974

The Howard Gardner Nichols Memorial Library is a historic building in Gadsden, Alabama, United States. The library was built in 1902 by the Nichols family, owners of the Dwight Manufacturing Company. It is named in honor of their son, who was badly injured while supervising the construction of the company's mill in what was then Alabama City. He died several days later.

The library is the home of NEAGS, the NorthEast Alabama Genealogical Society, and houses over 5,000 family files as well as family books and many references for the counties in northeast Alabama. Also found are Civil War and Revolutionary War references as well as books on genealogy and history of states close to Alabama. The building housed the first lending library in the state of Alabama. At one time it was a day care center for the mill workers' children. It also was a lawyer's office. Now the library is solely owned by NEAGS, dedicated to genealogy research.

The building is similar in scale to the mill workers' houses that surround it, but its location on a corner lot and blend of Classical Revival and Victorian design make it a focal point of the neighborhood. It has a steeply pitched hip roof with deep, bracketed eaves. The façade is anchored by a semi-circular portico supported by six Ionic columns, flanked by windows with lancet arched upper sashes. It was purchased and restored in 1973 by the NorthEast Alabama Genealogical Society. The building was listed on the National Register of Historic Places in 1974.
