= Colonel O.R. Hood House =

Historic house in Alabama, United States

- Col. O. R. Hood House
- U.S. National Register of Historic Places
- Alabama Register of Landmarks and Heritage
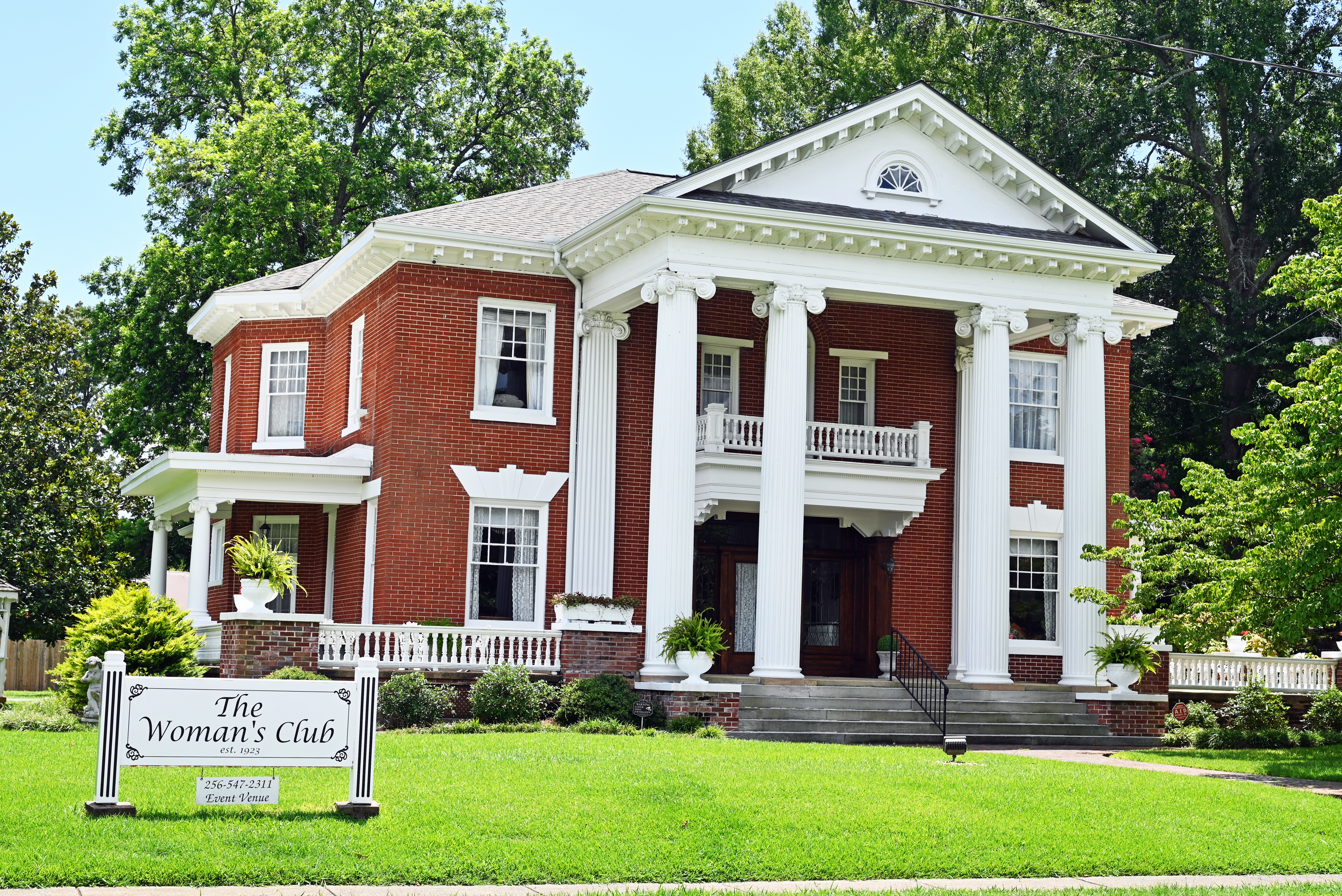
- The house in July 2026

- Location within Alabama Location within the United States
- Location: 862 Chestnut St., Gadsden, Alabama
- Coordinates: 34°0′50″N 86°0′51″W
- Area: less than one acre
- Built: 1904
- Built by: James Crisman
- Architect: James Crisman
- Architectural style: Classical Revival
- NRHP reference No.: 86001000

Significant dates
- Added to NRHP: May 8, 1986
- Designated ARLH: April 16, 1985

The Colonel O. R. Hood House is a historic residence in Gadsden, Alabama, United States. The house was built in 1904 by Oliver Roland Hood, an attorney, politician, industrialist, and one of the founders of the Alabama Power Company. He was also a delegate to the state's 1901 constitutional convention. It was designed and constructed by architect/builder James Crisman. Upon Hood's death in 1951, the house was purchased by the Woman's Club of Gadsden, a community service organization. The house is built in Classical Revival style with some Victorian details. The façade is dominated by a double-height portico supported by four Ionic columns. The front door is flanked by wide sidelights and a tall transom. The house also has two side entrances on octagonal bays at the rear of each side. The house was listed on the Alabama Register of Landmarks and Heritage in 1985 and the National Register of Historic Places in 1986.
