= Turrentine Historic District =

Historic district in Alabama, United States

- U.S. National Register of Historic Places
- U.S. Historic district
- Alabama Register of Landmarks and Heritage
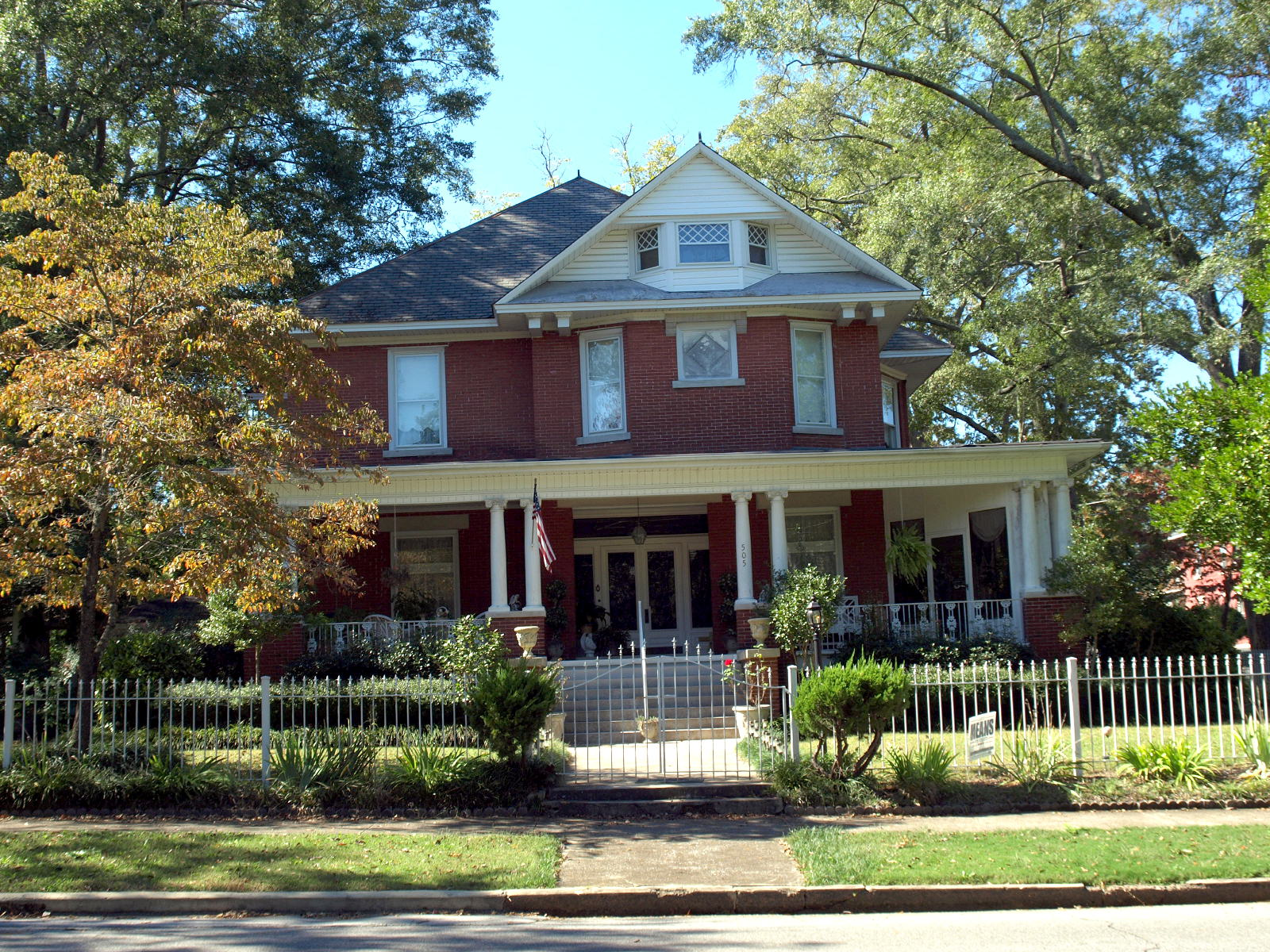
- 505 Turrentine Avenue in October 2014

- Location within Alabama Location within the United States
- Location: 300-633 Turrentine Ave., Gadsden, Alabama
- Coordinates: 34°0′31″N 86°0′51″W
- Area: 17 acres (6.9 ha)
- Architectural style: Queen Anne, Classical Revival
- NRHP reference No.: 05000649

Significant dates
- Added to NRHP: July 6, 2005
- Designated ARLH: March 8, 1994

The Turrentine Historic District is a historic district in Gadsden, Alabama, United States. The district stretches along Turrentine Avenue and includes houses built during Gadsden's largest period of growth from 1891 through 1934. The street, originally the lane leading from town to the home of General Daniel Clower Turrentine, was home to some of the city's most influential residents, including mayors, bankers, doctors, educators, and industrialists. Architectural styles found in the district include Queen Anne, Neoclassical, Spanish Revival, Craftsman, and Tudor Revival. The district was listed on the Alabama Register of Landmarks and Heritage in 1994 and the National Register of Historic Places in 2005.
