= Gadsden Times-News Building =

Historic building in Alabama, US

- U.S. National Register of Historic Places
- Alabama Register of Landmarks and Heritage
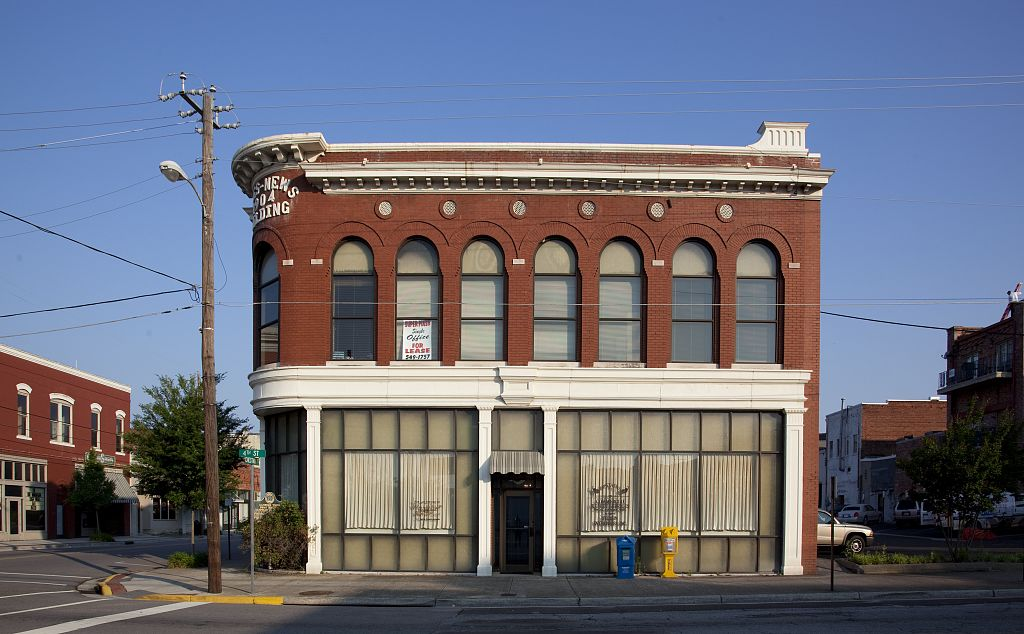
- The building in 2010

- Location within Alabama Location within the United States
- Location: Fourth and Chestnut Sts., Gadsden, Alabama
- Coordinates: 34°0′44″N 86°0′14″W
- Area: less than one acre
- Built: 1904
- Architectural style: Italianate
- NRHP reference No.: 83002967

Significant dates
- Added to NRHP: January 11, 1983
- Designated ARLH: February 11, 1982

The Gadsden Times-News Building is a historic building in Gadsden, Alabama, United States. It was built by the owners of The Gadsden Times-News in 1904. After changing their name to The Gadsden Times in 1924, the paper moved its operation to another building in 1927. It has since housed a variety of commercial businesses. The two-story building is brick and rounded on the street corner. The 4th Street ground-level façade has cast iron pilasters and entablature, with large windows surrounded by smaller panes. The second floor has a series of arched one-over-one sash windows and a cornice with heavy modillions, which is raised on the curve. The building was listed on the Alabama Register of Landmarks and Heritage in 1982 and the National Register of Historic Places in 1983.
