= United States Post Office (Gadsden, Alabama) =

- U.S. Post Office
- U.S. National Register of Historic Places
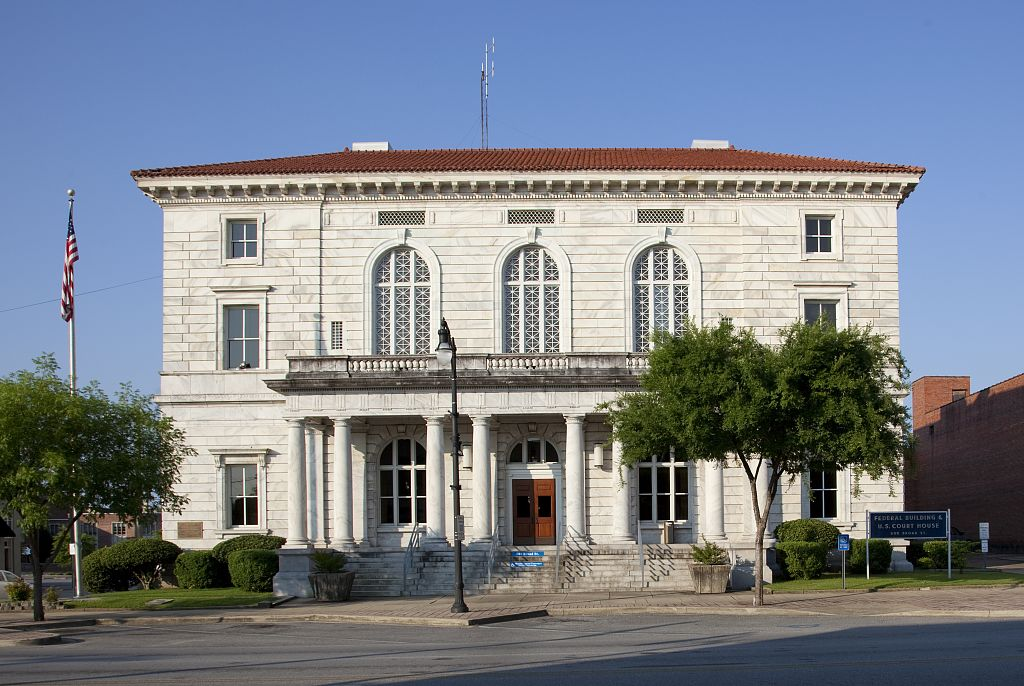
- The building in 2010

- Location within Alabama Location within the United States
- Location: 600 Broad St., Gadsden, Alabama
- Coordinates: 34°0′52″N 86°0′24″W
- Area: less than one acre
- Built: 1909-10; 1911-13; 1935-36
- Architect: Office of the Supervising Architect
- Architectural style: Beaux-Arts
- NRHP reference No.: 76000325
- Added to NRHP: June 3, 1976

The U.S. Post Office, also known as the Federal Building and Courthouse, is a historic government building in Gadsden, Alabama, United States.

== Architecture and history ==
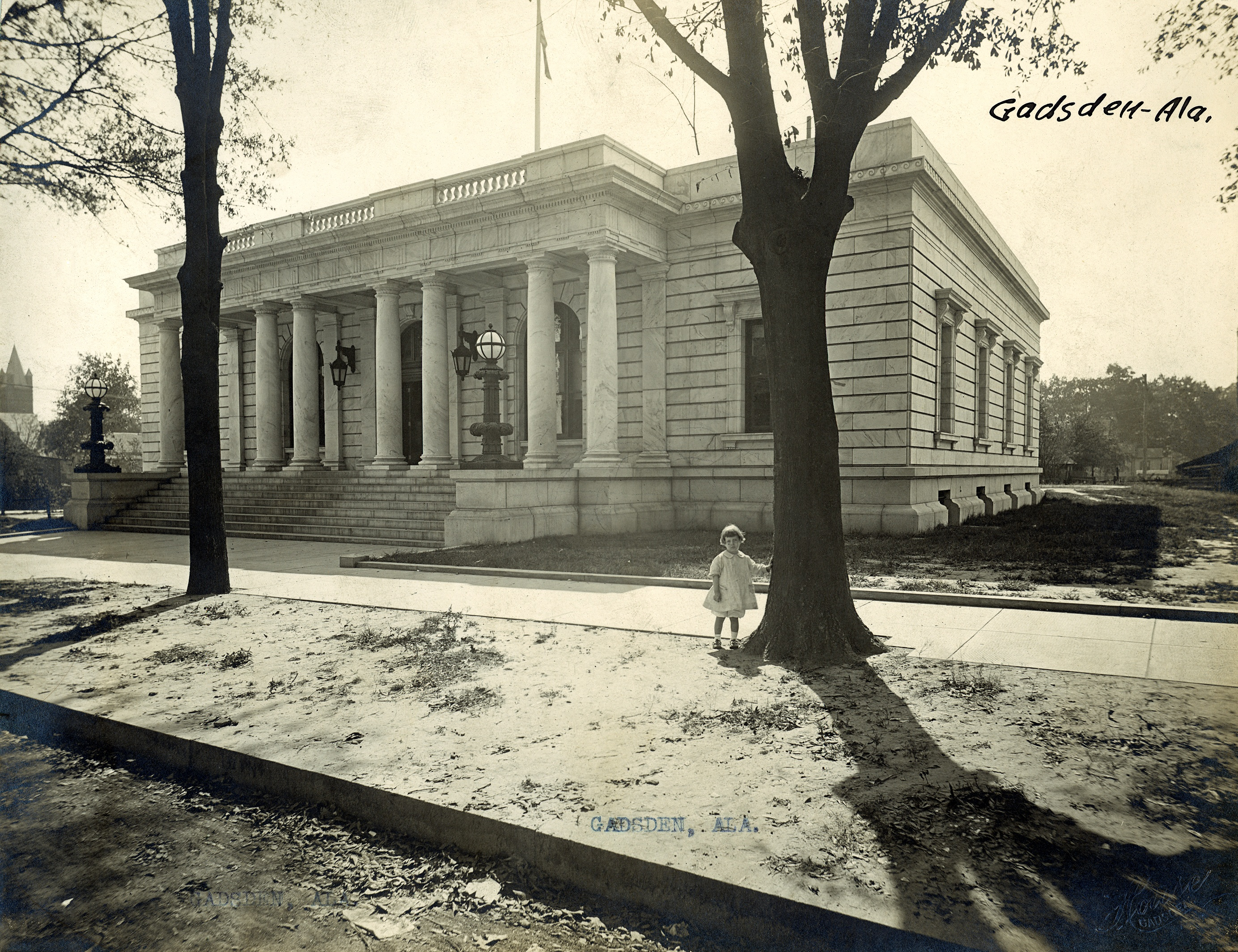
The Gadsden Post Office prior to expansion.

The Beaux-Arts-style building was constructed in 1909 by architects and engineers in the Office of the Supervising Architect under James Knox Taylor. When it was completed in 1910 it was a one story building housing facilities for the United States Post Office. Only a year later construction began on an addition which added two stories to the building, providing space for the United States District Court for the Northern District of Alabama and other federal agencies. This was completed in 1913, and in 1935-36 a large rear wing was added.

The post office moved to a new building in the 1960s, and the building was fully vacated by the government after 2012. In 2017, the building was purchased by Campbell Development, LLC, a firm owned by Gadsden natives Anna Campbell and Caleb Campbell. It now serves as a professional office space for a number of businesses.

It was listed on the National Register of Historic Places on June 3, 1976.

== See also ==
- List of United States post offices
