= Attalla, Alabama =

City in Alabama, United States

Attalla
- City
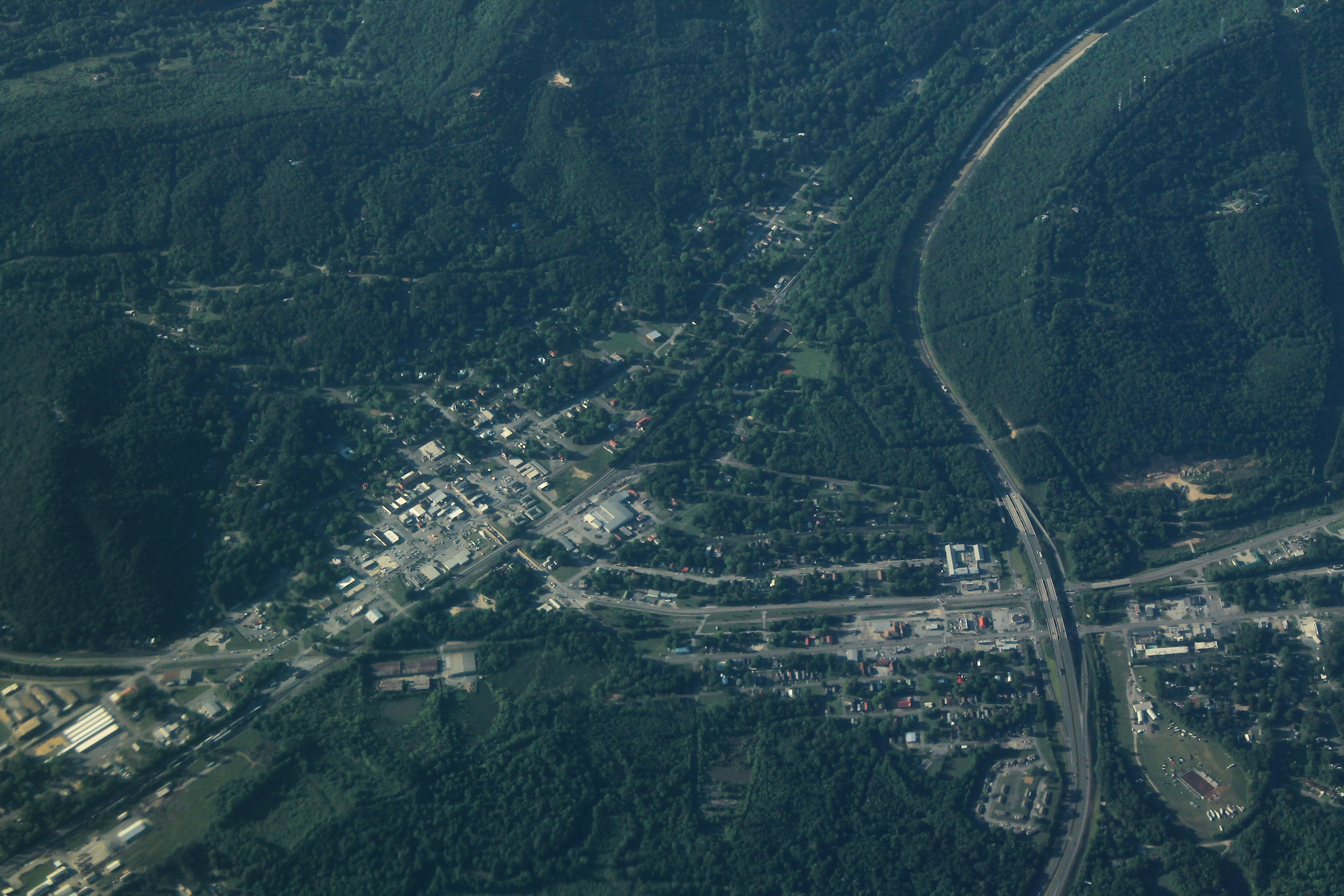
- Aerial view of Attalla

- Logo
- Motto: "Gateway to Northeast Alabama"
- Location of Attalla in Etowah County, Alabama.
- Coordinates: 34°0′35″N 86°5′54″W
- Country: United States
- State: Alabama
- County: Etowah

Government
  - Type: Mayor-Council
  - Mayor: Larry Means

Area
  - Total: 7.00 sq mi (18.13 km^{2})
  - Land: 7.00 sq mi (18.13 km^{2})
  - Water: 0 sq mi (0.00 km^{2})
- Elevation: 558 ft (170 m)

Population (2020)
  - Total: 5,827
  - Density: 832.6/sq mi (321.46/km^{2})
- Time zone: UTC-6 (Central (CST))
  - Summer (DST): UTC-5 (CDT)
- ZIP code: 35954
- Area code: 256
- FIPS code: 01-03028
- GNIS feature ID: 2403130
- Website: www.attallacity.com

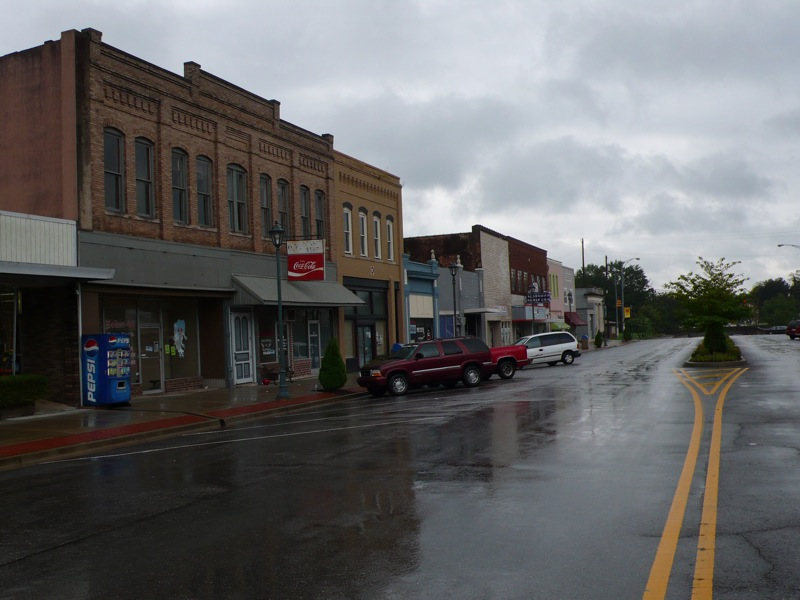
Downtown Attalla

Attalla is a city in Etowah County, Alabama, United States. As of the 2020 census, Attalla had a population of 5,827.

== History ==
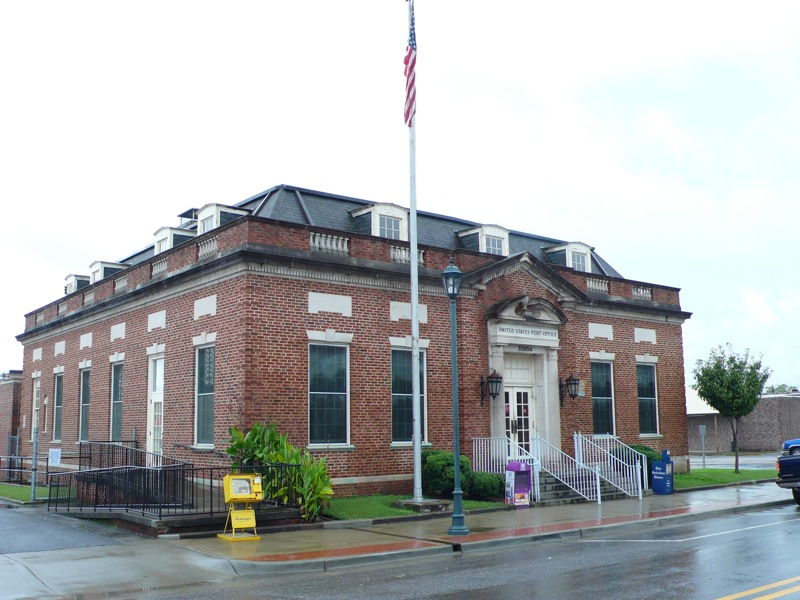
The U.S. Post Office in Attalla was added to the National Register of Historic Places on June 21, 1983.

The town developed on the area of a former Muscogee (Creek) village that was important during the Creek War. Most of the Creek people were forced out under the Indian Removal Act of 1830. White European migrants from the coastal areas came into this area to acquire land. The wealthier ones developed cotton plantations based on the labor of enslaved African Americans.

Cherokee people had also lived in this area, after being encroached on in Tennessee and western North Carolina. David Brown (Cherokee) was assisted by the Rev. D. S. Butterick in preparing the Cherokee Spelling Book while he lived here.

Attalla was not founded until 1870; it was established on land donated by W. C. Hammond, a plantation owner. It was incorporated as a city government on February 5, 1872. The town was officially named "Attalla" in 1893, derived from the Cherokee language word otali meaning "mountain".

Railroads served the town and connected it to other markets. When the railroads went into bankruptcy, Attalla's prosperity declined in the late 19th century financial troubles.

Attalla is the site of the first hydroelectric dam constructed to provide electricity for a city; it was built in 1887.

=== 20th century to present ===
William Lewis Moore, a white U.S. postman and civil rights activist, was murdered here on April 23, 1963. He was walking from Chattanooga, Tennessee, to Jackson, Mississippi to publicize his support of civil rights with a letter for Mississippi Governor Ross Barnett. The suspected killer, Floyd Simpson, was never charged with the crime.

== Geography ==
Attalla is in Etowah County and is bordered to the east by the city of Gadsden, the county seat, and at its southernmost point by Rainbow City.

Interstate 59 runs along the eastern edge of the city, with access from Exits 181 and 183. U.S. Route 11 passes through the center of town as Third Street and runs generally parallel to I‑59, leading northeast 36 miles (58 km) to Fort Payne and southwest 58 miles (93 km) to Birmingham. U.S. Routes 278 and 431 also pass through the center of Attalla, leading east 5 miles (8 km) to downtown Gadsden. US 431 runs north 20 miles (32 km) to Albertville, while US 278 leads west 47 miles (76 km) to Cullman. Alabama State Route 77 passes through the southern section of Attalla, leading north 3 miles (5 km) to US 431 and southeast 6 miles (10 km) to Rainbow City.

According to the U.S. Census Bureau, the city has a total area of 7.0 square miles (18.1 km^{2}), all of it land. Big Wills Creek, a tributary of the Coosa River, flows southeasterly through the city. The southern end of Lookout Mountain rises to the east overlooking the city.

== Demographics ==
Historical population
Census	Pop.	Note	%±
1880	351		—
1890	1,254		257.3%
1900	1,692		34.9%
1910	2,513		48.5%
1920	3,462		37.8%
1930	4,585		32.4%
1940	4,885		6.5%
1950	7,537		54.3%
1960	8,257		9.6%
1970	7,510		−9.0%
1980	7,737		3.0%
1990	6,859		−11.3%
2000	6,592		−3.9%
2010	6,048		−8.3%
2020	5,827		−3.7%
U.S. Decennial Census

=== Racial and ethnic composition ===
Attalla city, Alabama – Racial and ethnic composition Note: the US Census treats Hispanic/Latino as an ethnic category. This table excludes Latinos from the racial categories and assigns them to a separate category. Hispanics/Latinos may be of any race.
Race / Ethnicity (NH = Non-Hispanic)	Pop 1980	Pop 1990	Pop 2000	Pop 2010	Pop 2020	% 1980	% 1990	% 2000	% 2010	% 2020
White alone (NH)	6,327	5,778	5,489	4,834	4,337	81.78%	84.24%	83.27%	79.93%	74.43%
Black or African American alone (NH)	1,359	1,032	866	767	774	17.56%	15.05%	13.14%	12.68%	13.28%
Native American or Alaska Native alone (NH)	10	18	22	18	13	0.13%	0.26%	0.33%	0.30%	0.22%
Asian alone (NH)	5	0	12	29	33	0.06%	0.00%	0.18%	0.48%	0.57%
Native Hawaiian or Pacific Islander alone (NH)	x	x	0	1	0	x	x	0.00%	0.02%	0.00%
Other race alone (NH)	0	0	6	8	7	0.00%	0.00%	0.09%	0.13%	0.12%
Mixed race or Multiracial (NH)	x	x	33	104	326	x	x	0.50%	1.72%	5.59%
Hispanic or Latino (any race)	36	31	164	287	337	0.47%	0.45%	2.49%	4.75%	5.78%
Total	7,737	6,859	6,592	6,048	5,827	100.00%	100.00%	100.00%	100.00%	100.00%

=== 2020 census ===
As of the 2020 census, Attalla had a population of 5,827. The median age was 40.5 years. 22.6% of residents were under the age of 18 and 20.0% of residents were 65 years of age or older. For every 100 females there were 88.9 males, and for every 100 females age 18 and over there were 84.3 males age 18 and over.s

95.7% of residents lived in urban areas, while 4.3% lived in rural areas.

There were 2,403 households in Attalla, of which 30.8% had children under the age of 18 living in them. Of all households, 37.4% were married-couple households, 20.1% were households with a male householder and no spouse or partner present, and 37.0% were households with a female householder and no spouse or partner present. About 33.4% of all households were made up of individuals and 17.1% had someone living alone who was 65 years of age or older. There were 1,364 families residing in the city.

There were 2,759 housing units, of which 12.9% were vacant. The homeowner vacancy rate was 0.9% and the rental vacancy rate was 10.1%.

=== 2010 census ===
At the 2010 census there were 6,048 people, 2,442 households, and 1,627 families living in the city. The population density was 983.9 inhabitants per square mile (379.9/km^{2}). There were 2,841 housing units at an average density of 424 per square mile (164/km^{2}). The racial makeup of the city was 81.5% White, 12.7% Black or African American, .4% Native American, 0.5% Asian, 2.9% from other races, and 2.0% from two or more races. 4.7% of the population were Hispanic or Latino of any race. Of the 2,442 households 27.0% had children under the age of 18 living with them, 42.5% were married couples living together, 18.1% had a female householder with no husband present, and 33.4% were non-families. 29.8% of households were one person and 13.0% were one person aged 65 or older. The average household size was 2.41 and the average family size was 2.07.

The age distribution was 22.7% under the age of 18, 8.9% from 18 to 24, 25.0% from 25 to 44, 26.3% from 45 to 64, and 17.2% 65 or older. The median age was 39.8 years. For every 100 females, there were 89.3 males. For every 100 females age 18 and over, there were 94.9 males.

The median household income was $32,426 and the median family income was $35,934. Males had a median income of $33,428 versus $25,441 for females. The per capita income for the city was $16,457. About 13.9% of families and 18.2% of the population were below the poverty line, including 27.5% of those under age 18 and 13.9% of those age 65 or over.

=== 2000 census ===
At the 2000 census there were 6,795 people, 2,672 households, and 1,976 families living in the city. The population density was 988.0 inhabitants per square mile (381.5/km^{2}). There were 2,914 housing units at an average density of 436.7 per square mile (168.6/km^{2}). The racial makeup of the city was 78.42% White, 13.5% Black or African American, 1.5% Native American, 0.08% Asian, 1.64% from other races, and 0.67% from two or more races. 2.22% of the population were Hispanic or Latino of any race. Of the 2,620 households 30.2% had children under the age of 18 living with them, 47.6% were married couples living together, 16.4% had a female householder with no husband present, and 31.5% were non-families. 29.0% of households were one person and 13.9% were one person aged 65 or older. The average household size was 2.45 and the average family size was 3.00.

The age distribution was 23.7% under the age of 18, 8.9% from 18 to 24, 27.3% from 25 to 44, 22.4% from 45 to 64, and 17.7% 65 or older. The median age was 38 years. For every 100 females, there were 90.2 males. For every 100 females age 18 and over, there were 86.5 males.

The median household income was $27,444 and the median family income was $39,549. Males had a median income of $30,605 versus $19,693 for females. The per capita income for the city was $15,727. About 16.4% of families and 18.6% of the population were below the poverty line, including 22.5% of those under age 18 and 22.0% of those age 65 or over.

== Attalla Precinct/Division (1880–1970) ==
The Attalla Beat (Etowah County 17th Beat) first appeared on the 1880 U.S. Census. In 1890, "beat" was changed to "precinct". In 1960, the precinct was changed to "census division" as part of a general reorganization of counties. In 1980, Attalla census division was consolidated with Gadsden census division.

== Education ==
The Attalla City School System is the public school district. As of 2006, it has some 1,823 students.

The district includes the following schools:

- Attalla Elementary School (Grades Pk–5)
- Etowah Middle School (Grades 6–8)
- Etowah High School (Grades 9–12)

== Transportation ==
Etowah County Rural Transportation provides dial-a-ride bus service throughout the city and county.

== Notable people ==
- Gerald William Barrax (1933–2019), poet and educator
- Betty Kelly (born September 16, 1944), member of Motown girl group Martha and the Vandellas
- Larry Means (born April 20, 1947), former member of the Alabama Senate and current mayor
- Derrick Nix (born February 22, 1980), defensive coordinator for the Auburn Tigers
- Patrick Nix (born April 7, 1972), former Auburn University quarterback
- Tyrone Nix (born September 30, 1972), defensive coordinator for the Ole Miss Rebels
- B. L. Noojin (1885–1950), athlete, educator, and politician
- Albert Staton (1899–1980), basketball and football player for Georgia Institute of Technology

== Gallery ==
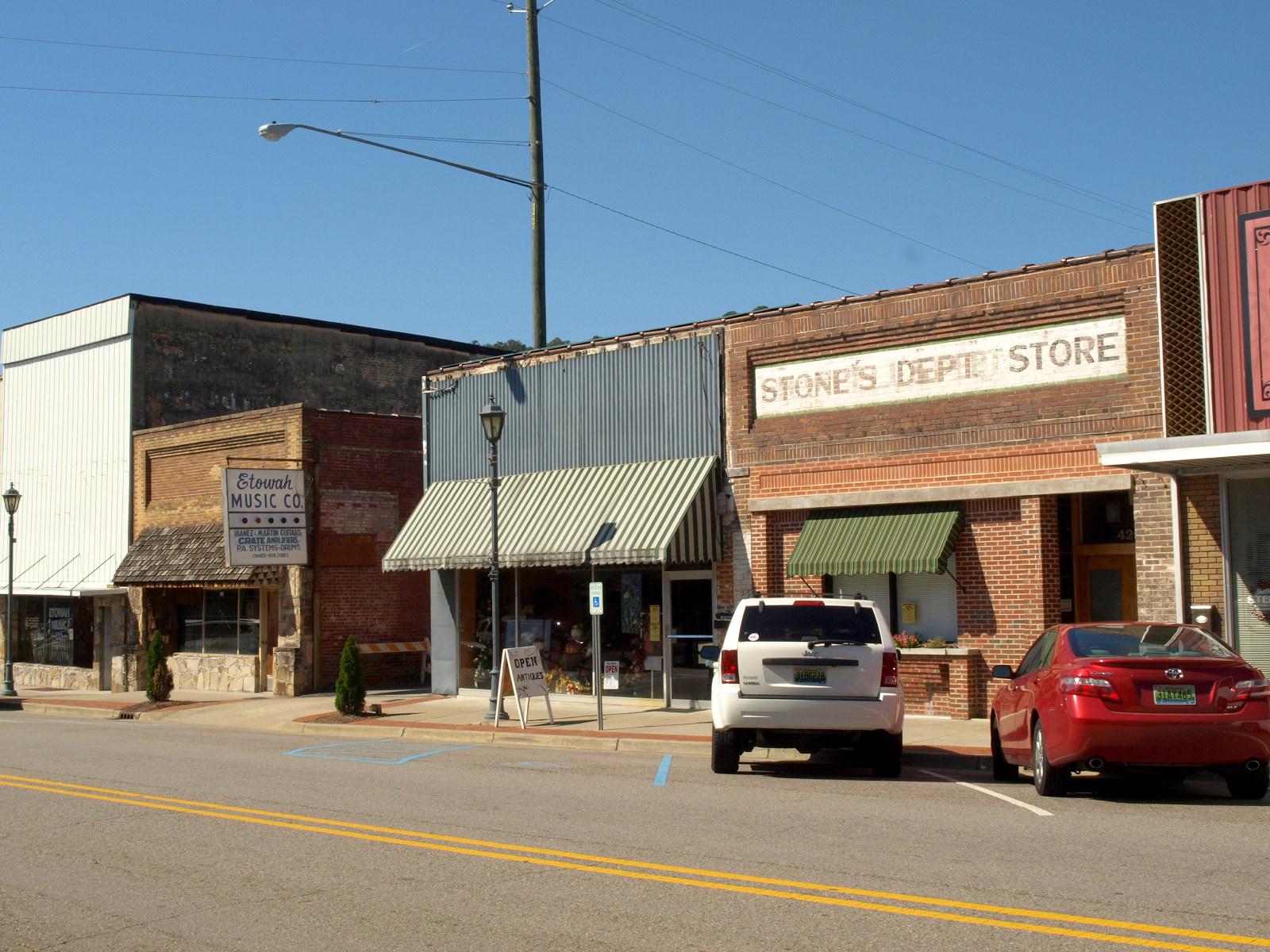
4th Street, Attalla

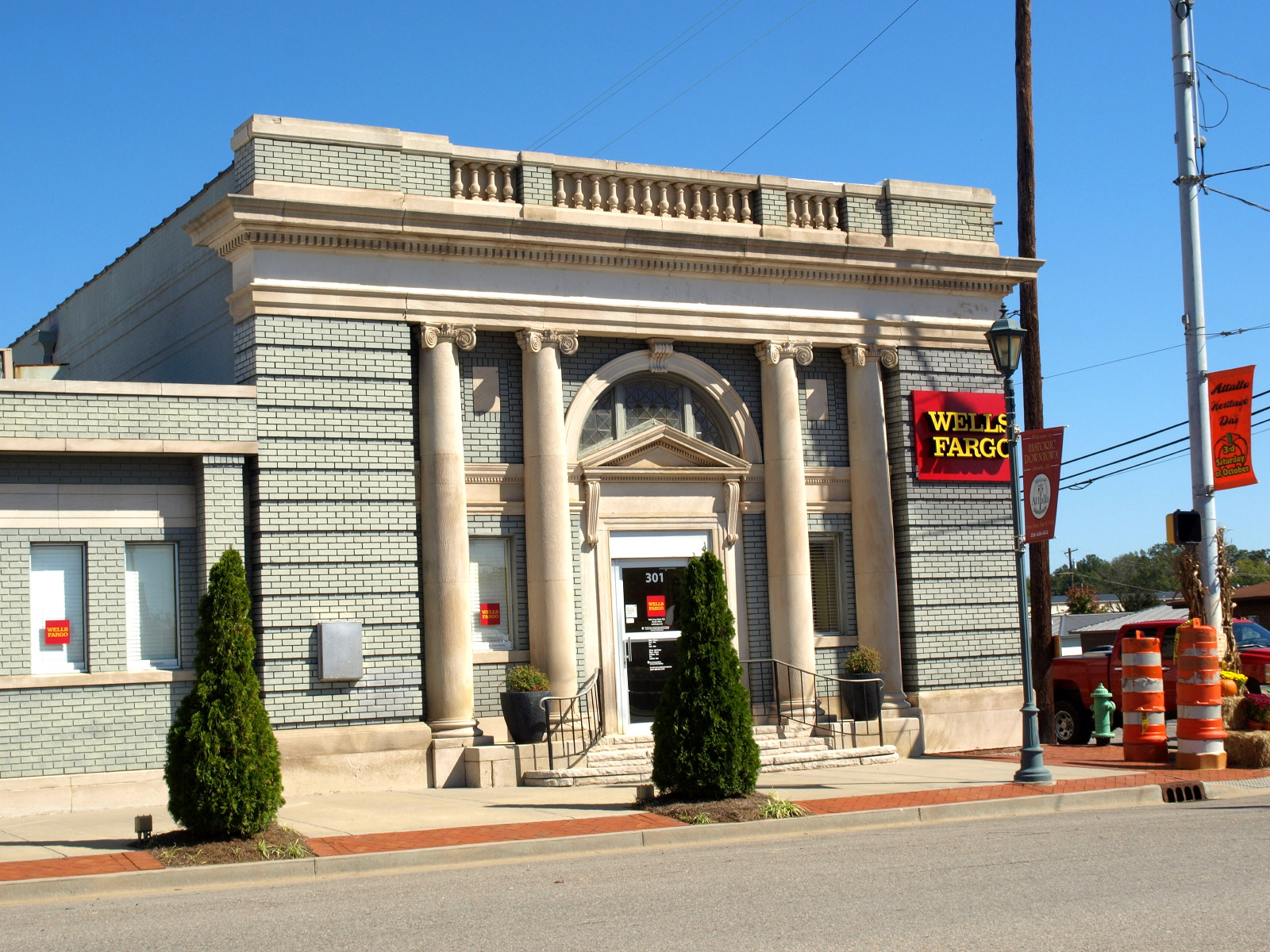
Bank of Attalla

Historic Alabama Power Company sign, Attalla

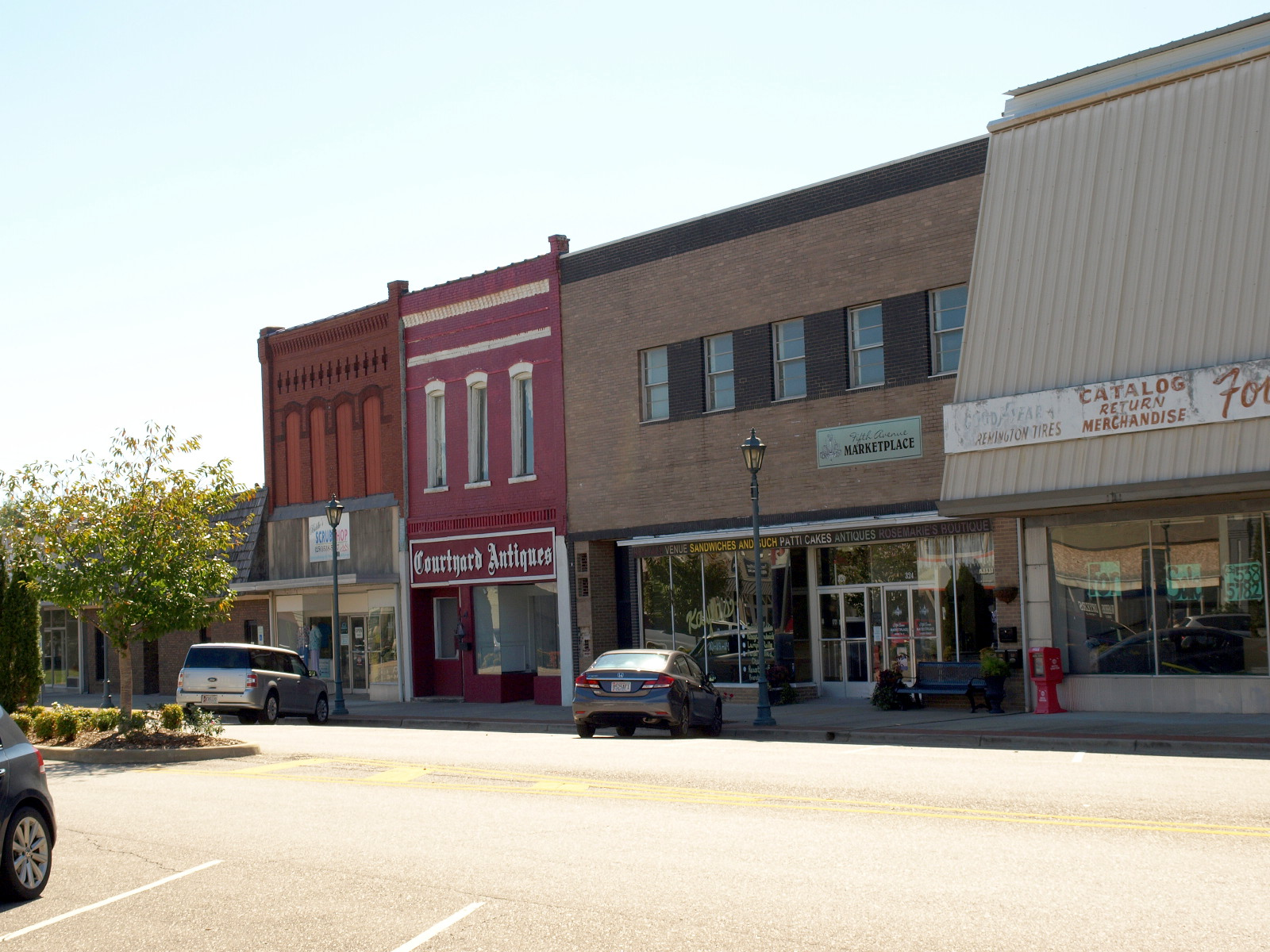
5th Avenue, Attalla

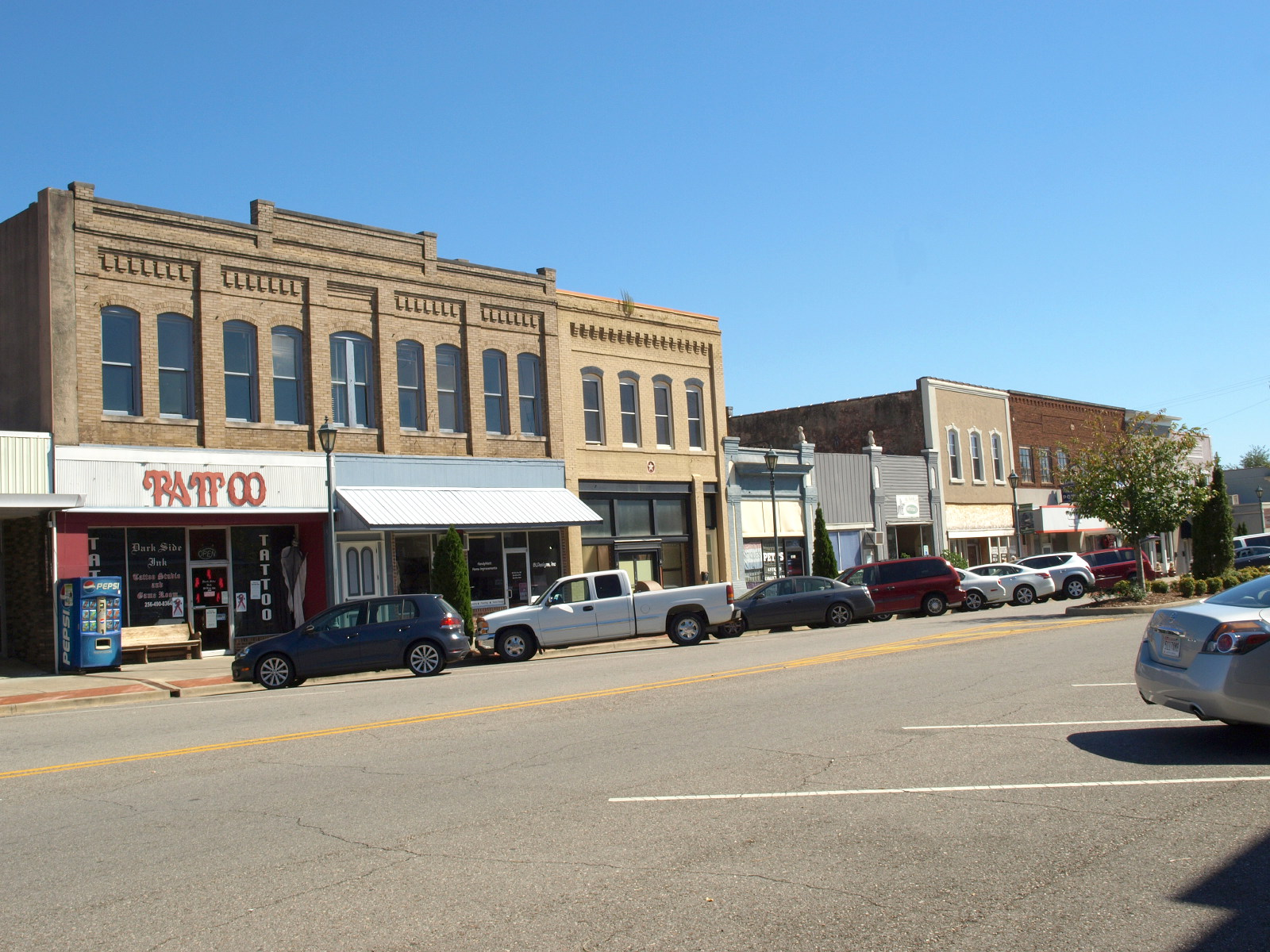
5th Avenue, Attalla

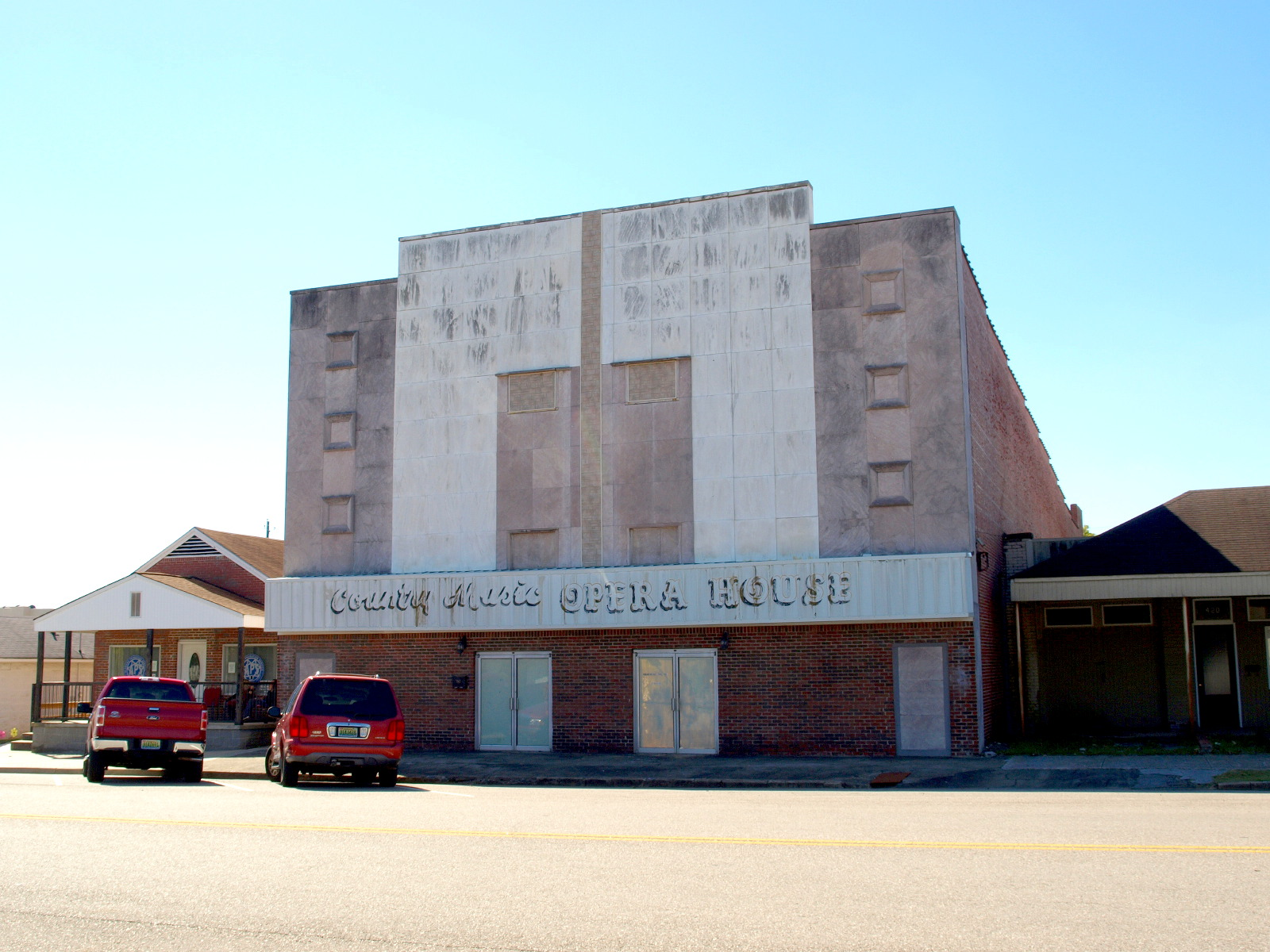
Country Music Opera House, Attalla

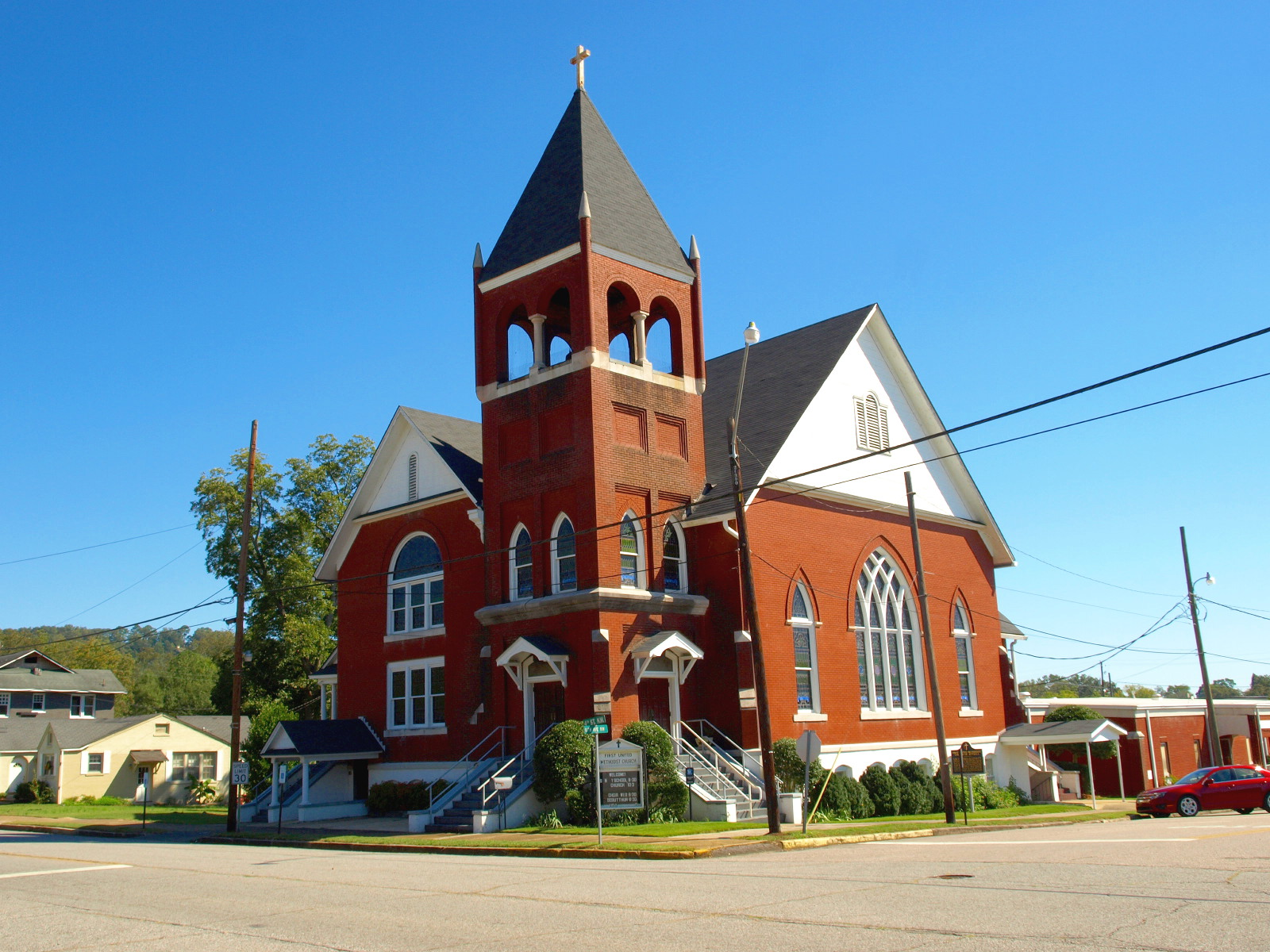
First United Methodist Church, Attalla

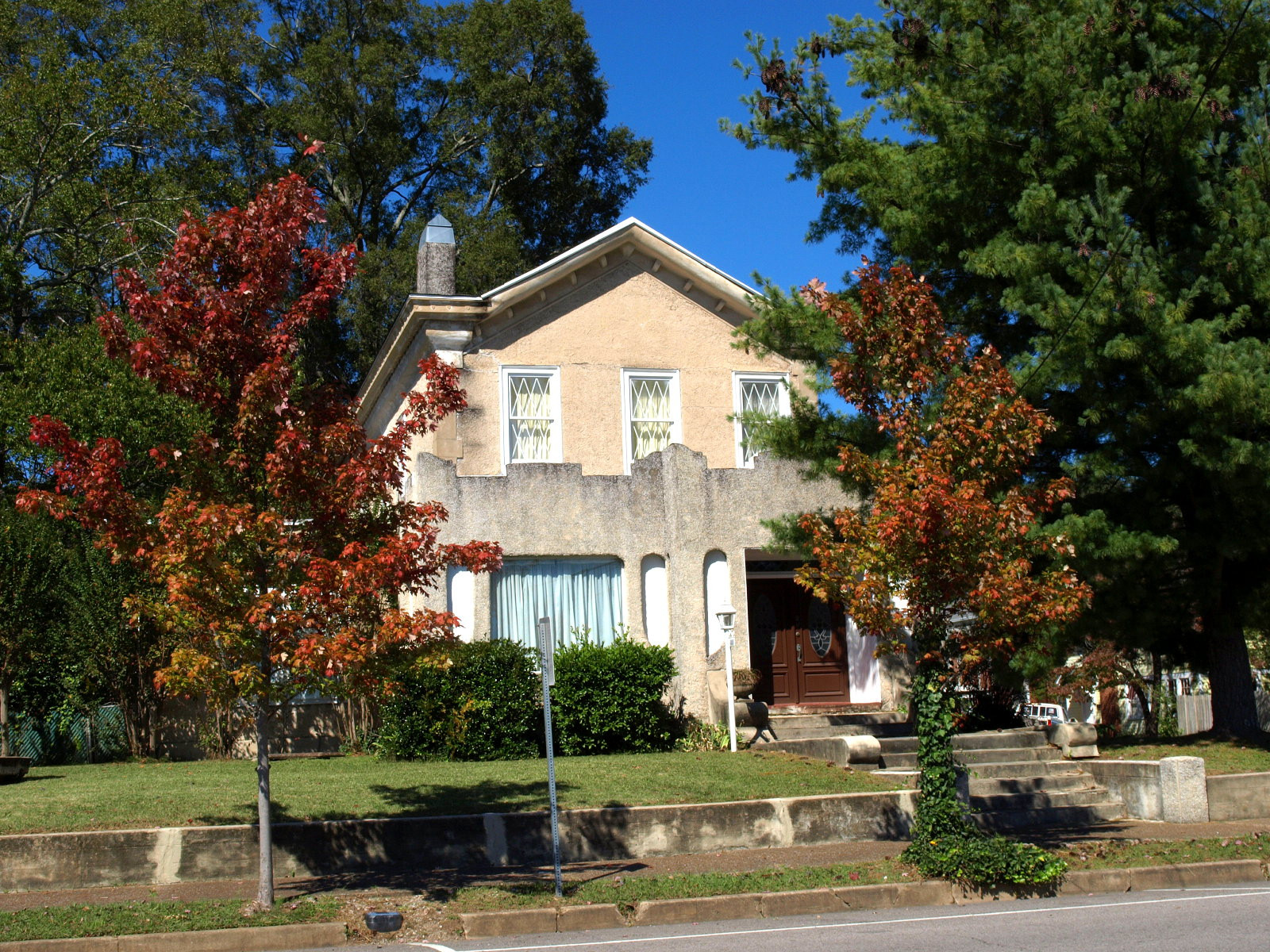
Seven Cedars, Attalla

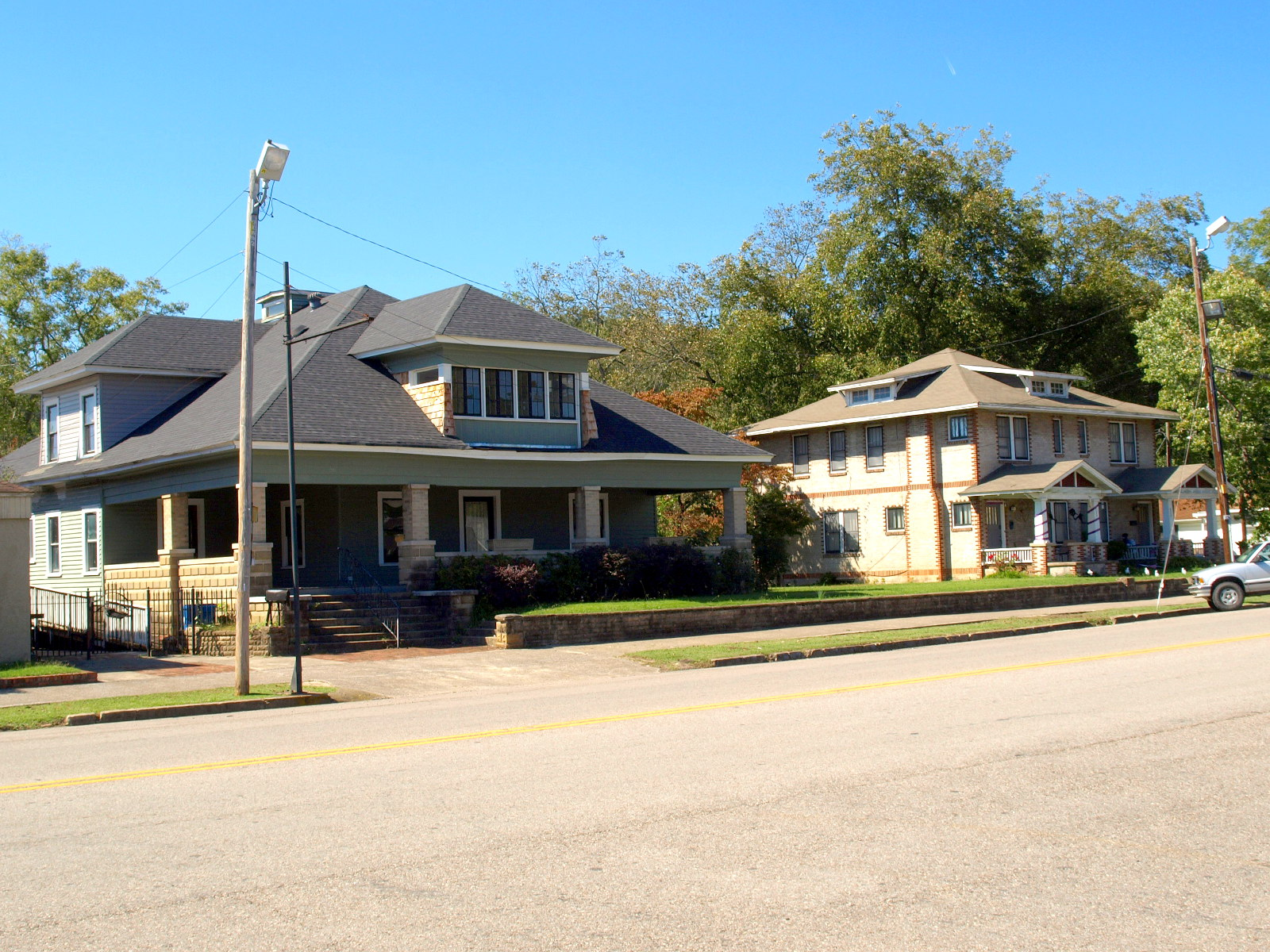
Houses on 5th Avenue, Attalla

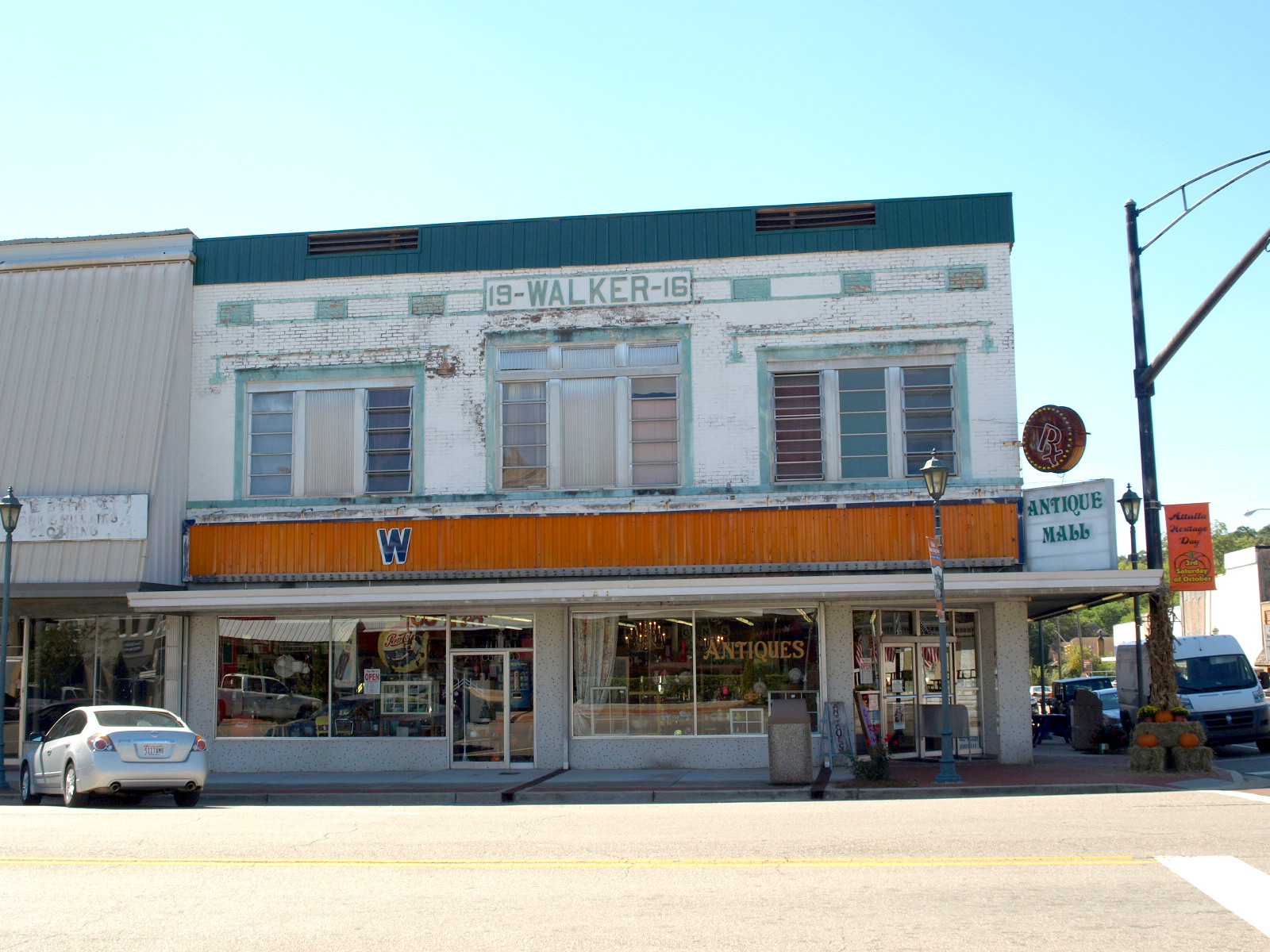
Walker's Drug Store building, Attalla

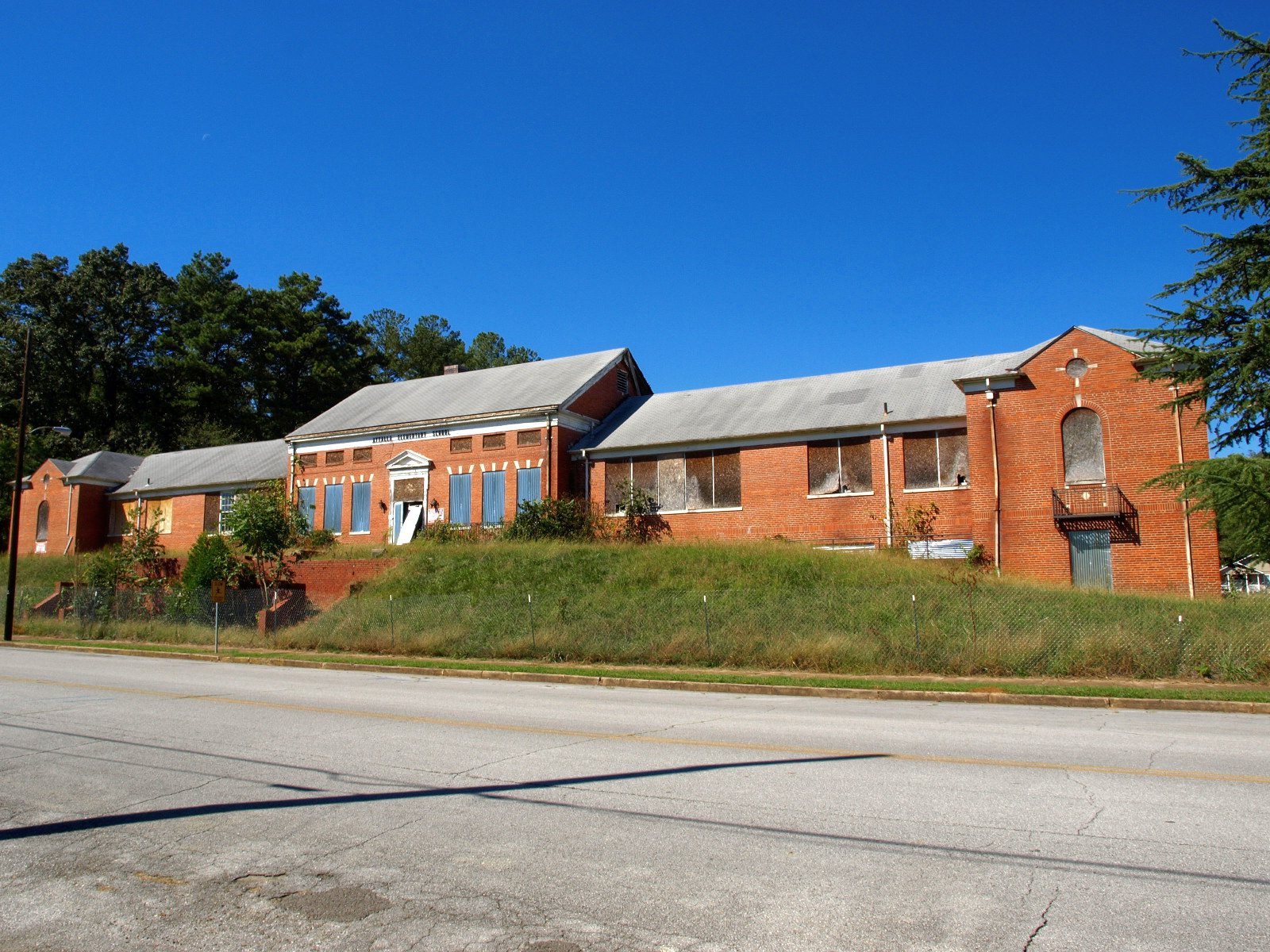
Old Attalla Elementary School
