= 2020 Auburn Tigers football team =

American college football season

2020 Auburn Tigers football

Citrus Bowl, L 19–35 vs. Northwestern
- Conference: Southeastern Conference
- Western Division
- Record: 6–5 (6–4 SEC)
- Head coach: Gus Malzahn (8th season; regular season); Kevin Steele (interim; bowl game)
- Offensive coordinator: Chad Morris (1st season)
- Offensive scheme: Spread option
- Defensive coordinator: Kevin Steele (5th season)
- Base defense: 4–3
- Home stadium: Jordan–Hare Stadium

2020 Southeastern Conference football standings
	Conf.			Overall
Team	W		L	W		L
Eastern Division
No. 13 Florida x	8	–	2	8	–	4
No. 7 Georgia	7	–	2	8	–	2
Missouri	5	–	5	5	–	5
Kentucky	4	–	6	5	–	6
Tennessee*	3	–	7	3	–	7
South Carolina	2	–	8	2	–	8
Vanderbilt	0	–	9	0	–	9
Western Division
No. 1 Alabama x$#^	10	–	0	13	–	0
No. 4 Texas A&M	8	–	1	9	–	1
Auburn	6	–	4	6	–	5
LSU*	5	–	5	5	–	5
Ole Miss	4	–	5	5	–	5
Arkansas	3	–	7	3	–	7
Mississippi State	3	–	7	4	–	7
Championship: Alabama 52, Florida 46
# – College Football Playoff champion; ^ – College Football Playoff participant; $ – Conference champion; x – Division champion/co-champions; * – Tennessee vacated all wins due to NCAA violations. LSU was ineligible for postseason due to self imposed ban. Note: Due to COVID-19, the SEC played a conference-only schedule.; Rankings from AP Poll.

The 2020 Auburn Tigers football team represented Auburn University in the 2020 NCAA Division I FBS football season. The Tigers played their home games at Jordan–Hare Stadium in Auburn, Alabama, and competed in the Western Division of the Southeastern Conference (SEC). They were led by eighth-year head coach Gus Malzahn until his dismissal at the end of the regular season. The team's spring game, originally intended to be played on April 11, 2020, was canceled due to the COVID-19 pandemic. The Tigers' regular-season schedule was also impacted as all non-conference games were canceled and the SEC allowed teams to play 10 in-conference games only.

On December 13, 2020, head coach Gus Malzahn was fired after eight years. After reaching the 2014 BCS National Championship Game at the end of the 2013 season, Auburn won at least 10 games under Malzahn only once more, in 2017. Kevin Steele, defensive coordinator, was designated to serve as the Tigers' interim coach for the Citrus Bowl. In December 2020, Bryan Harsin was hired as head coach.

== SEC Media Days ==
In the preseason media poll, Auburn was predicted to finish in third place in the West Division.

== Schedule ==
Auburn announced its 2020 football schedule on August 7, 2019. The 2020 schedule originally consisted of 7 home, 4 away, and 1 neutral game in the regular season.

The Tigers had games scheduled against Alcorn State, North Carolina, Southern Miss, and UMass, which were canceled due to the COVID-19 pandemic. In July, the SEC announced the non-conference games would be canceled and only ten conference games would only be played.

Date	Time	Opponent	Rank	Site	TV	Result	Attendance
September 26	11:00 a.m.	No. 23 Kentucky	No. 8	Jordan–Hare Stadium; Auburn, AL	SECN	W 29–13	17,490
October 3	6:30 p.m.	at No. 4 Georgia	No. 7	Sanford Stadium; Athens, GA (Deep South's Oldest Rivalry /College GameDay)	ESPN	L 6–27	20,524
October 10	3:00 p.m.	Arkansas	No. 13	Jordan–Hare Stadium; Auburn, AL	ESPN	W 30–28	17,490
October 17	11:00 a.m.	at South Carolina	No. 15	Williams–Brice Stadium; Columbia, SC	ESPN	L 22–30	15,766
October 24	11:00 a.m.	at Ole Miss		Vaught–Hemingway Stadium; Oxford, MS (rivalry)	SECN	W 35–28	15,037
October 31	2:30 p.m.	LSU		Jordan–Hare Stadium; Auburn, AL (Tiger Bowl)	CBS	W 48–11	17,490
November 21	6:00 p.m.	Tennessee	No. 23	Jordan–Hare Stadium; Auburn, AL (rivalry)	ESPN	W 30–17	17,490
November 28	2:30 p.m.	at No. 1 Alabama	No. 22	Bryant–Denny Stadium; Tuscaloosa, AL (Iron Bowl/College GameDay)	CBS	L 13–42	19,424
December 5	11:00 a.m.	No. 5 Texas A&M		Jordan–Hare Stadium; Auburn, AL	ESPN	L 20–31	17,490
December 12^{[a]}	6:30 p.m.	at Mississippi State		Davis Wade Stadium; Starkville, MS	SECN	W 24–10	12,986
January 1, 2021	12:00 p.m.	vs. No. 14 Northwestern*		Camping World Stadium; Orlando, FL (Citrus Bowl)	ABC	L 19–35	13,039
*Non-conference game; Rankings from AP Poll and CFP Rankings (after November 24) released prior to game; All times are in Central time

^{^[a]}The game between Auburn and Mississippi State was postponed due to an outbreak of COVID-19 on the Mississippi State team. The game was originally scheduled for November 14.
Schedule source:

== Game summaries ==
=== Kentucky ===
Game One – No. 23 Kentucky Wildcats (0–0) at No. 8 Auburn Tigers (0–0)

Quarter	1	2	3	4	Total
No. 23 Wildcats	7	0	6	0	13
No. 8 Tigers	8	0	7	14	29

at Jordan–Hare Stadium • Auburn, Alabama

- Date: Saturday, September 26, 2020
- Game time: 11:03 a.m. CDT
- Game weather: Cloudy • Temperature: 75 °F (24 °C) • Wind: 5 mph W
- Game attendance: 17,490
- Referee: Steve Marlowe
- TV announcers (SEC Network): Tom Hart (play-by-play), Jordan Rodgers (analyst), Cole Cubelic (sideline reporter)

Game information

First quarter

- (6:44) UK – Kavosiey Smoke 35 yd rush, Matt Ruffolo kick (Drive: 11 plays, 93 yds, 6:23; Kentucky 7–0)
- (4:30) AUB – D. J. Williams 1 yd rush, John Samuel Shenker pass (Drive: 7 plays, 70 yds, 2:07; Auburn 8–7)

Second quarter

No scoring

Third quarter

- (5:42) AUB – Seth Williams 11 yd pass from Bo Nix, Anders Carlson kick (Drive: 9 plays, 76 yds, 4:19; Auburn 15–7)
- (1:00) UK – Akeem Hayes 8 yd pass from Terry Wilson, Terry Wilson pass failed (Drive: 11 plays, 73 yds, 4:34; Auburn 15–13)

Fourth quarter

- (10:21) AUB – Seth Williams 4 yd pass from Bo Nix, Anders Carlson kick (Drive: 5 plays, 23 yds, 2:13; Auburn 22–13)
- (8:17) AUB – Eli Stove 21 yd pass from Bo Nix, Anders Carlson kick (Drive: 2 plays, 27 yds, 0:50; Auburn 29–13)

Statistics	UK	AUB
First downs	21	16
Plays–yards	78–384	57–324
Rushes–yards	40–145	30–91
Passing yards	239	233
Passing: comp–att–int	24–38–1	16–27–0
Turnovers		
Time of possession	36:29	23:31

Team	Category	Player	Statistics
Kentucky	Passing	Terry Wilson	24/37, 239 yds, 1 TD, 1 INT
Kentucky	Rushing	Kavosiey Smoke	7 carries, 62 yds, 1 TD
Kentucky	Receiving	Josh Ali	9 receptions, 98 yds
Auburn	Passing	Bo Nix	16/27, 233 yds, 3 TD
Auburn	Rushing	Bo Nix	5 carries, 34 yds
Auburn	Receiving	Seth Williams	6 receptions, 112 yds, 2 TD

=== At Georgia ===
Game Two – No. 7 Auburn Tigers (1–0) at No. 4 Georgia Bulldogs (1–0)

Quarter	1	2	3	4	Total
No. 7 Tigers	0	3	3	0	6
No. 4 Bulldogs	10	14	3	0	27

at Sanford Stadium • Athens, Georgia

- Date: Saturday, October 3, 2020
- Game time: 6:38 p.m. CDT
- Game weather: Fair • Temperature: 64 °F (18 °C) • Wind: 5 mph E
- Game attendance: 20,524
- Referee: James Carter
- TV announcers (ESPN): Chris Fowler (play-by-play), Kirk Herbstreit (analyst), Allison Williams (sideline reporter)

Game information

First quarter

- (9:31) UGA – Zamir White 1 yd rush, Jack Podlesny kick (Drive: 10 plays, 43 yds, 2:56; Georgia 7–0)
- (4:00) UGA – Jack Podlesny 21 yd field goal (Drive: 11 plays, 59 yds, 3:56; Georgia 10–0)

Second quarter

- (11:08) UGA – George Pickens 21 yd pass from Stetson Bennett, Jack Podlesny kick (Drive: 11 plays, 84 yds, 5:26; Georgia 17–0)
- (6:26) UGA – Zamir White 1 yd rush, Jack Podlesny kick (Drive: 6 plays, 72 yds, 3:27; Georgia 24–0)
- (1:38) AUB – Anders Carlson 20 yd field goal (Drive: 12 plays, 65 yds, 4:40; Georgia 24–3)

Third quarter

- (10:09) AUB – Anders Carlson 45 yd field goal (Drive: 15 plays, 54 yds, 4:46; Georgia 24–6)
- (5:51) UGA – Jack Podlesny 25 yd field goal (Drive: 10 plays, 67 yds, 4:18; Georgia 27–6)

Fourth quarter

No scoring

Statistics	AUB	UGA
First downs	15	25
Plays–yards	63–216	73–442
Rushes–yards	22–39	45–202
Passing yards	177	240
Passing: comp–att–int	21–41–1	17–28–0
Turnovers		
Time of possession	25:56	34:04

Team	Category	Player	Statistics
Auburn	Passing	Bo Nix	21/41, 177 yds, 1 INT
Auburn	Rushing	Tank Bigsby	8 carries, 31 yds
Auburn	Receiving	Anthony Schwartz	8 receptions, 57 yds
Georgia	Passing	Stetson Bennett	17/28, 240 yds, 1 TD
Georgia	Rushing	Zamir White	19 carries, 88 yds, 2 TD
Georgia	Receiving	Kearis Jackson	9 receptions, 147 yds

=== Arkansas ===
Game Three – Arkansas Razorbacks (1–1) at No. 13 Auburn Tigers (1–1)

Quarter	1	2	3	4	Total
Razorbacks	0	12	6	10	28
No. 13 Tigers	10	10	0	10	30

at Jordan–Hare Stadium • Auburn, Alabama

- Date: Saturday, October 10, 2020
- Game time: 3:05 p.m. CDT
- Game weather: Rainy • Temperature: 78 °F (26 °C) • Wind: 11 mph S
- Game attendance: 17,490
- Referee: Jason Autrey
- TV announcers (ESPN): Taylor Zarzour (play-by-play), Matt Stinchcomb (analyst), Lauren Sisler (sideline reporter)

Game information

First quarter

- (4:32) AUB – Barton Lester 0 yd punt return, Anders Carlson kick (Drive: 0 plays, 0 yds, 0:00; Auburn 7–0)
- (0:36) AUB – Anders Carlson 47 yd field goal (Drive: 5 plays, 47 yds, 2:34; Auburn 10–0)

Second quarter

- (9:22) AUB – Bo Nix 15 yd rush, Anders Carlson kick (Drive: 10 plays, 80 yds, 4:49; Auburn 17–0)
- (6:24) ARK – Michael Woods II 4 yd pass from Feleipe Franks, PAT kick failed (Drive: 8 plays, 65 yds, 2:58; Auburn 17–6)
- (2:15) ARK – DeVion Warren 7 yd pass from Feleipe Franks, PAT pass by Feleipe Franks failed (Drive: 6 plays, 75 yds, 2:00; Auburn 17–12)
- (0:38) AUB – Anders Carlson 25 yd field goal (Drive: 6 plays, 57 yds, 1:37; Auburn 20–12)

Third quarter

- (4:14) ARK – Trelon Smith 5 yd pass from Feleipe Franks, PAT pass by Feleipe Franks failed (Drive: 13 plays, 85 yds, 5:30; Auburn 20–18)

Fourth quarter

- (14:51) AUB – Anthony Schwartz 17 yd pass from Bo Nix, Anders Carlson kick (Drive: 9 plays, 64 yds, 4:12; Auburn 27–18)
- (11:37) ARK – AJ Reed 23 yd field goal (Drive: 10 plays, 70 yds, 3:14; Auburn 27–21)
- (5:29) ARK – DeVion Warren 30 yd pass from Feleipe Franks, AJ Reed kick (Drive: 10 plays, 70 yds, 4:50; Arkansas 28–27)
- (0:07) AUB – Anders Carlson 39 yd field goal (Drive: 7 plays, 23 yds, 1:59; Auburn 30–28)

Statistics	ARK	AUB
First downs	22	24
Plays–yards	72–437	70–446
Rushes–yards	42–119	41–259
Passing yards	318	187
Passing: comp–att–int	22–30–0	17–28–0
Turnovers		
Time of possession	27:42	32:18

Team	Category	Player	Statistics
Arkansas	Passing	Feleipe Franks	22/30, 318 yds, 4 TD
Arkansas	Rushing	Trelon Smith	21 carries, 81 yds
Arkansas	Receiving	Michael Woods II	6 receptions, 81 yds, 1 TD
Auburn	Passing	Bo Nix	17/28, 187 yds, 1 TD
Auburn	Rushing	Tank Bigsby	20 carries, 146 yds
Auburn	Receiving	Anthony Schwartz	10 receptions, 100 yds, 1 TD

=== At South Carolina ===
Game Four – No. 15 Auburn Tigers (2–1) at South Carolina Gamecocks (1–2)

Quarter	1	2	3	4	Total
No. 15 Tigers	9	7	3	3	22
Gamecocks	0	14	13	3	30

at Williams–Brice Stadium • Columbia, South Carolina

- Date: Saturday, October 17, 2020
- Game time: 11:02 a.m. CDT
- Game weather: Sunny • Temperature: 62 °F (17 °C) • Wind: NE 10 mph
- Game attendance: 15,766
- Referee: Steve Marlowe
- TV announcers (ESPN): Dave Pasch (play-by-play), Greg McElroy (analyst), Holly Rowe (sideline reporter)

Game information

First quarter

- (8:32) AUB – Anders Carlson 35 yd field goal (Drive: 14 plays, 62 yds, 4:57; Auburn 3–0)
- (4:33) AUB – Eli Stove 11 yd pass from Bo Nix, Grant Loy pass failed (Drive: 7 plays, 56 yds, 2:01; Auburn 9–0)

Second quarter

- (12:49) SC – Kevin Harris 3 yd run, Parker White kick (Drive: 5 plays, 29 yds, 2:00; Auburn 9–7)
- (10:24) AUB – Tank Bigsby 2 yd run, Anders Carlson kick (Drive: 7 plays, 75 yds, 2:25; Auburn 16–7)
- (0:35) SC – Collin Hill 1 yd run, Parker White kick (Drive: 11 plays, 49 yds, 4:28; Auburn 16–14)

Third quarter

- (10:22) AUB – Anders Carlson 38 yd field goal (Drive: 11 plays, 54 yds, 4:38; Auburn 19–14)
- (6:31) SC – Shi Smith 10 yd pass from Collin Hill, Collin Hill pass failed (Drive: 9 plays, 75 yds, 3:51; South Carolina 20–19)
- (0:54) SC – Kevin Harris 8 yd run, Parker White kick (Drive: 1 play, 8 yds, 0:05; South Carolina 27–19)

Fourth quarter

- (9:13) SC – Parker White 39 yd field goal (Drive: 9 plays, 58 yds, 4:28; South Carolina 30–19)
- (6:39) AUB – Anders Carlson 22 yd field goal (Drive: 7 plays, 70 yds, 2:34; South Carolina 30–22)

Statistics	AUB	SC
First downs	27	20
Plays–yards	83–481	67–297
Rushes–yards	36–209	43–153
Passing yards	272	144
Passing: comp–att–int	24–47–3	15–24–1
Turnovers		
Time of possession	28:43	31:17

Team	Category	Player	Statistics
Auburn	Passing	Bo Nix	24/47, 272 yds, 1 TD, 3 INT
Auburn	Rushing	Tank Bigsby	16 carries, 111 yds, 1 TD
Auburn	Receiving	Seth Williams	4 receptions, 74 yds
South Carolina	Passing	Collin Hill	15/24, 144 yds, 1 TD, 1 INT
South Carolina	Rushing	Kevin Harris	25 carries, 83 yds, 2 TD
South Carolina	Receiving	Shi Smith	8 receptions, 76 yds, 1 TD

=== At Ole Miss ===
Game Five – Auburn Tigers (2–2) at Ole Miss Rebels (1–3)

Quarter	1	2	3	4	Total
Tigers	7	7	7	14	35
Rebels	0	14	7	7	28

at Vaught–Hemingway Stadium • Oxford, Mississippi

- Date: Saturday, October 24, 2020
- Game time: 11:03 a.m. CDT
- Game weather: Cloudy • Temperature: 52 °F (11 °C)
- Game attendance: 15,037
- Referee: Marc Curles
- TV announcers (SEC Network): Tom Hart (play-by-play), Jordan Rodgers (analyst), Cole Cubelic (sideline reporter)

Game information

First quarter

- (2:17) AUB – Tank Bigsby 4 yd run, Anders Carlson kick (Drive: 14 plays, 95 yds, 5:53; Auburn 7–0)

Second quarter

- (13:46) MISS – Elijah Moore 6 yd pass from Matt Corral, Luke Logan kick (Drive: 10 plays, 75 yds, 3:31; Tied 7–7)
- (9:11) AUB – Bo Nix 4 yd run, Anders Carlson kick (Drive: 10 plays, 79 yds, 4:28; Auburn 14–7)
- (3:35) MISS – Matt Corral 5 yd run, Luke Logan kick (Drive: 16 plays, 78 yds, 5:31; Tied 14–14)

Third quarter

- (7:09) MISS – Matt Corral 10 yd run, Luke Logan kick (Drive: 3 plays, 89 yds, 0:34; Ole Miss 21–14)
- (2:57) AUB – Shaun Shivers 1 yd run, Anders Carlson kick (Drive: 10 plays, 88 yds, 4:04; Tied 21–21)

Fourth quarter

- (10:12) AUB – Tank Bigsby 18 yd run, Ben Patton rush failed (Drive: 11 plays, 80 yds, 5:08; Auburn 27–21)
- (5:43) MISS – Jerrion Ealy 5 yd run, Luke Logan kick (Drive: 13 plays, 77 yds, 4:21; Ole Miss 28–27)
- (1:11) AUB – Seth Williams 58 yd pass from Bo Nix, pass by Seth Williams (Drive: 6 plays, 80 yds, 1:14; Auburn 35–28)

Statistics	AUB	MISS
First downs	26	25
Plays–yards	77–462	79–444
Rushes–yards	47–224	51–283
Passing yards	238	161
Passing: comp–att–int	23–30–0	17–28–2
Turnovers		
Time of possession	31:48	28:12

Team	Category	Player	Statistics
Auburn	Passing	Bo Nix	23/30, 238 yds, 1 TD
Auburn	Rushing	Tank Bigsby	24 carries, 129 yds, 2 TD
Auburn	Receiving	Seth Williams	8 receptions, 134 yds, 1 TD
Ole Miss	Passing	Matt Corral	16/27, 154 yds, 1 TD, 2 INT
Ole Miss	Rushing	Matt Corral	10 rushes, 88 yds, 2 TD
Ole Miss	Receiving	Elijah Moore	5 receptions, 16 yds, 1 TD

=== LSU ===
Game Six – LSU Tigers (2–2) at Auburn Tigers (3–2)

Quarter	1	2	3	4	Total
LSU Tigers	0	3	0	8	11
Auburn Tigers	0	21	21	6	48

at Jordan–Hare Stadium • Auburn, Alabama

- Date: Saturday, October 31, 2020
- Game time: 2:39 p.m. CDT
- Game weather: Sunny • Temperature: 67 °F (19 °C) • Wind: 8 mph E
- Game attendance: 17,490
- Referee: Alex Moore
- TV announcers (CBS): Brad Nessler (play-by-play), Gary Danielson (analyst), Jamie Erdahl (sideline reporter)

Game information

First quarter

No scoring

Second quarter

- (12:13) AUB – Eli Stove 9 yd pass from Bo Nix, Anders Carlson kick (Drive: 1 play, 4 yds, 0:32; Auburn 7–0)
- (5:27) AUB – Christian Tutt 20 yd fumble return, Anders Carlson kick (Auburn 14–0)
- (0:40) AUB – Ze'Vian Capers 9 yd pass from Bo Nix, Anders Carlson kick (Drive: 8 plays, 99 yds, 2:56; Auburn 21–0)
- (0:00) LSU – Cade York 50 yd field goal (Drive: 5 plays, 32 yds, 0:33; Auburn 21–3)

Third quarter

- (11:35) AUB – Bo Nix 5 yd run, Anders Carlson kick (Drive: 8 plays, 75 yds, 3:25; Auburn 28–3)
- (8:55) AUB – Tank Bigsby 2 yd run, Anders Carlson kick (Drive: 5 plays, 21 yds, 2:34; Auburn 35–3)
- (1:33) AUB – Tank Bigsby 3 yd run, Anders Carlson kick (Drive: 12 plays, 69 yds, 5:21; Auburn 42–3)

Fourth quarter

- (14:37) AUB – Anthony Schwartz 91 yd pass from Bo Nix, Anders Carlson kick failed (Drive: 1 play, 91 yds, 0:11; Auburn 48–3)
- (8:43) LSU – Kayshon Boutte 43 yd pass from Max Johnson, Max Johnson run (Drive: 4 plays, 71 yds, 1:16; Auburn 48–11)

Statistics	LSU	AUB
First downs	20	23
Plays–yards	75–347	70–506
Rushes–yards	27–32	44–206
Passing yards	315	300
Passing: comp–att–int	28–48–2	18–26–0
Turnovers		
Time of possession	28:31	31:29

Team	Category	Player	Statistics
LSU	Passing	Max Johnson	15/24, 172 yds, 1 TD
LSU	Rushing	John Emery	9 carries, 21 yds
LSU	Receiving	Arik Gilbert	6 receptions, 55 yds
Auburn	Passing	Bo Nix	18/24, 300 yds, 3 TD
Auburn	Rushing	Bo Nix	11 carries, 81 yds, 1 TD
Auburn	Receiving	Eli Stove	5 receptions, 64 yds, 1 TD

=== Tennessee ===
Game Seven – Tennessee Volunteers (2–4) at No. 23 Auburn Tigers (4–2)

Quarter	1	2	3	4	Total
Volunteers	7	3	0	7	17
No. 23 Tigers	0	10	10	10	30

at Jordan–Hare Stadium • Auburn, Alabama

- Date: Saturday, November 21, 2020
- Game time: 6:10 p.m. CST
- Game weather: Clear skies • Temperature: 61 °F (16 °C) • Wind: 3 mph E
- Game attendance: 17,490
- Referee: David Smith
- TV announcers (ESPN): Joe Tessitore (play-by-play), Greg McElroy (analyst), Allison Williams (sideline reporter)

Game information

First quarter

- (5:56) TENN – Jarrett Guarantano 9 yd rush, Brent Cimaglia kick (Drive: 9 plays, 80 yds, 4:42; Tennessee 7–0)

Second quarter

- (13:42) TENN – Brent Cimaglia 47 yd field goal (Drive: 8 plays, 50 yds, 3:58; Tennessee 10–0)
- (12:06) AUB – Anthony Schwartz 54 yd pass from Bo Nix, Anders Carlson kick (Drive: 4 plays, 79 yds, 1:35; Tennessee 10–7)
- (5:36) AUB – Anders Carlson 25 yd field goal (Drive: 13 plays, 70 yds, 5:35; Tied 10–10)

Third quarter

- (7:25) AUB – Anders Carlson 27 yd field goal (Drive: 15 plays, 65 yds, 7:35; Auburn 13–10)
- (2:21) AUB – Smoke Monday 100 yd interception return, Anders Carlson kick (Auburn 20–10)

Fourth quarter

- (7:14) AUB – D.J. Williams 9 yd rush, Anders Carlson kick (Drive: 12 plays, 80 yds, 5:19; Auburn 27–10)
- (4:07) TENN – Eric Gray 1 yd rush, Brent Cimaglia kick (Drive: 9 plays, 75 yds, 3:07; Auburn 27–17)
- (1:27) AUB – Anders Carlson 50 yd field goal (Drive: 7 plays, 11 yds, 2:39; Auburn 30–17)

Statistics	TENN	AUB
First downs	28	23
Plays–yards	74–464	64–385
Rushes–yards	41–222	38–165
Passing yards	242	220
Passing: comp–att–int	22–33–1	17–26–1
Turnovers		
Time of possession	31:29	28:31

Team	Category	Player	Statistics
Tennessee	Passing	Jarrett Guarantano	15/23, 156 yds, 1 INT
Tennessee	Rushing	Eric Gray	22 carries, 173 yds, 1 TD
Tennessee	Receiving	Ty Chandler	4 receptions, 37 yds
Auburn	Passing	Bo Nix	17/26, 220 yds, 1 TD, 1 INT
Auburn	Rushing	D.J. Williams	11 carries, 66 yds, 1 TD
Auburn	Receiving	Seth Williams	5 receptions, 52 yds

=== At Alabama ===
Game Eight – No. 22 Auburn Tigers (5–2) at No. 1 Alabama Crimson Tide (7–0)

Quarter	1	2	3	4	Total
No. 22 Tigers	0	3	3	7	13
No. 1 Crimson Tide	7	14	14	7	42

at Bryant–Denny Stadium • Tuscaloosa, Alabama

- Date: Saturday, November 28, 2020
- Game time: 2:39 p.m. CST
- Game weather: Partly cloudy • Temperature: 63 °F (17 °C) • Wind: N 6 mph
- Game attendance: 19,424
- Referee: Jason Autrey
- TV announcers (CBS): Brad Nessler (play-by-play), Gary Danielson (analyst), Jamie Erdahl (sideline reporter)

Game information

First quarter

- (5:10) ALA – DeVonta Smith 66 yd pass from Mac Jones, Will Reichard kick (Drive: 4 plays, 78 yds, 1:51; Alabama 7–0)

Second quarter

- (14:04) ALA – John Metchie III 7 yd pass from Mac Jones, Will Reichard kick (Drive: 7 plays, 66 yds, 2:21; Alabama 14–0)
- (8:51) AUB – Anders Carlson 47 yd field goal (Drive: 12 plays, 51 yds, 5:13; Alabama 14–3)
- (6:24) ALA – Jahleel Billingsley 24 yd pass from Mac Jones, Will Reichard kick (Drive: 5 plays, 75 yds, 2:27; Alabama 21–3)

Third quarter

- (10:36) AUB – Anders Carlson 45 yd field goal (Drive: 7 plays, 47 yds, 3:00; Alabama 21–6)
- (9:08) ALA – DeVonta Smith 58 yd pass from Mac Jones, Will Reichard kick (Drive: 3 plays, 78 yds, 1:28; Alabama 28–6)
- (4:28) ALA – Najee Harris 39 yd run, Will Reichard kick (Drive: 5 plays, 61 yds, 2:07; Alabama 35–6)

Fourth quarter

- (13:27) ALA – John Metchie III 24 yd pass from Mac Jones, Will Reichard kick (Drive: 12 plays, 68 yds, 5:10; Alabama 42–6)
- (4:39) AUB – Bo Nix 1 yd run, Anders Carlson kick (Drive: 12 plays, 96 yds, 5:59; Alabama 42–13)

Statistics	AUB	ALA
First downs	20	20
Plays–yards	80–347	53–445
Rushes–yards	42–120	27–143
Passing yards	227	302
Passing: comp–att–int	23–38–2	18–26–0
Turnovers		
Time of possession	36:30	23:30

Team	Category	Player	Statistics
Auburn	Passing	Bo Nix	23/38, 227 yds, 2 INT
Auburn	Rushing	Mark-Antony Richards	14 carries, 57 yds
Auburn	Receiving	Eli Stove	7 receptions, 29 yds
Alabama	Passing	Mac Jones	18/26, 302 yds, 5 TD
Alabama	Rushing	Najee Harris	11 carries, 96 yds, 1 TD
Alabama	Receiving	DeVonta Smith	7 receptions, 171 yds, 2 TD

=== Texas A&M ===
Game Nine – No. 5 Texas A&M Aggies (6–1) at Auburn Tigers (5–3)

Quarter	1	2	3	4	Total
No. 5 Aggies	7	7	0	17	31
Tigers	0	10	10	0	20

at Jordan–Hare Stadium • Auburn, Alabama

- Date: Saturday, December 5, 2020
- Game time: 11:02 a.m. CST
- Game weather: Sunny • Temperature: 52 °F (11 °C) • Wind: N 9 mph
- Game attendance: 17,490
- Referee: James Carter
- TV announcers (ESPN): Sean McDonough (play-by-play), Todd Blackledge (analyst), Todd McShay and Allison Williams (sideline reporters)

Game information

First quarter

- (8:42) TA&M – Jalen Wydermyer 10 yd pass from Kellen Mond, Seth Small kick (Drive: 11 plays, 75 yds, 6:18; Texas A&M 7–0)

Second quarter

- (14:11) AUB – Anders Carlson 37 yd field goal (Drive: 12 plays, 71 yds, 4:17; Texas A&M 7–3)
- (3:36) AUB – Bo Nix 5 yd rush, Anders Carlson kick (Drive: 9 plays, 80 yds, 4:33; Auburn 10–7)
- (0:24) TA&M – Kellen Mond 1 yd rush, Seth Small kick (Drive: 8 plays, 75 yds, 3:12; Texas A&M 14–10)

Third quarter

- (10:36) AUB – Bo Nix 3 yd rush, Anders Carlson kick (Drive: 9 plays, 75 yds, 4:24; Auburn 17–14)
- (4:16) AUB – Anders Carlson 24 yd field goal (Drive: 8 plays, 72 yds, 3:38; Auburn 20–14)

Fourth quarter

- (13:31) TA&M – Jalen Wydermyer 20 yd pass from Kellen Mond, Seth Small kick (Drive: 11 plays, 75 yds, 5:45; Texas A&M 21–20)
- (8:12) TA&M – Ainias Smith 4 yd rush, Seth Small kick (Drive: 7 plays, 77 yds, 3:42; Texas A&M 28–20)
- (1:09) TA&M – Seth Small 32 yd field goal (Drive: 12 plays, 55 yds, 5:32; Texas A&M 31–20)

Statistics	TA&M	AUB
First downs	29	16
Plays–yards	70–509	54–340
Rushes–yards	47–313	30–196
Passing yards	196	144
Passing: comp–att–int	18–23–0	15–23–0
Turnovers		
Time of possession	38:00	22:00

Team	Category	Player	Statistics
Texas A&M	Passing	Kellen Mond	18/23, 196 yds, 2 TD
Texas A&M	Rushing	Isaiah Spiller	20 carries, 120 yds
Texas A&M	Receiving	Jalen Wydermyer	8 receptions, 89 yds, 2 TD
Auburn	Passing	Bo Nix	15/23, 144 yds
Auburn	Rushing	Tank Bigsby	9 carries, 76 yds
Auburn	Receiving	Eli Stove	4 receptions, 29 yds

=== At Mississippi State ===
Game Ten – Auburn Tigers (5–4) at Mississippi State Bulldogs (2–6)

Quarter	1	2	3	4	Total
Tigers	3	3	3	15	24
Bulldogs	0	3	0	7	10

at Davis Wade Stadium • Starkville, Mississippi

- Date: Saturday, December 12, 2020
- Game time: 6:39 p.m. CST
- Game weather: Partly Cloudy • Temperature: 55 °F (13 °C) • Wind: Calm
- Game attendance: 12,986
- Referee: Lee Hedrick
- TV announcers (SEC Network): Tom Hart (play-by-play), Jordan Rodgers (analyst), Cole Cubelic (sideline reporter)

Game information

First quarter

- (6:47) AUB – Anders Carlson 27 yd field goal (Drive: 15 plays, 40 yds, 6:20; Auburn 3–0)

Second quarter

- (5:27) MSU – Brandon Ruiz 41 yd field goal (Drive: 11 plays, 37 yds, 5:13; Tied 3–3)
- (0:00) AUB – Anders Carlson 37 yd field goal (Drive: 7 plays, 37 yds, 3:18; Auburn 6–3)

Third quarter

- (4:28) AUB – Anders Carlson 45 yd field goal (Drive: 7 plays, 10 yds, 2:10; Auburn 9–3)

Fourth quarter

- (10:03) AUB – Seth Williams 32 yd pass from Bo Nix, Anders Carlson kick (Drive: 10 plays, 95 yds, 4:49; Auburn 16–3)
- (8:24) MSU – Austin Williams 8 yd pass from Will Rogers, Brandon Ruiz kick (Drive: 5 plays, 29 yds, 1:28; Auburn 16–10)
- (6:03) AUB – Bo Nix 3 yd run, pass by Ze'Vian Capers (Drive: 5 plays, 75 yds, 2:21; Auburn 24–10)

Statistics	AUB	MSU
First downs	19	17
Plays–yards	68–343	67–240
Rushes–yards	36–218	16–19
Passing yards	125	221
Passing: comp–att–int	15–32–0	30–51–2
Turnovers		
Time of possession	30:56	29:04

Team	Category	Player	Statistics
Auburn	Passing	Bo Nix	15/32, 125 yds, 1 TD
Auburn	Rushing	Tank Bigsby	26 carries, 192 yds
Auburn	Receiving	Anthony Schwartz	5 receptions, 32 yds
Mississippi State	Passing	Will Rogers	30/51, 221 yds, 1 TD, 2 INT
Mississippi State	Rushing	Dillon Johnson	5 carries, 30 yds
Mississippi State	Receiving	Jaden Walley	8 receptions, 100 yds

=== Vs. Northwestern (Citrus Bowl) ===
Vrbo Citrus Bowl – Auburn Tigers (6–4) vs. No. 14 Northwestern Wildcats (6–2)

Quarter	1	2	3	4	Total
Tigers	0	6	7	6	19
No. 14 Wildcats	14	0	7	14	35

at Camping World Stadium • Orlando, Florida

- Date: Friday, January 1, 2021
- Game time: 12:00 p.m. CST
- Game weather: Mostly Sunny
- Game attendance: 13,039
- Referee: Jerry Magallanes
- TV announcers (ABC): Dave Flemming (play-by-play), Rod Gilmore (analyst), Paul Carcaterra (sideline reporter)

Game information

First quarter

- (11:32) NU – Ramaud Chiaokhiao-Bowman 35 yard pass from Peyton Ramsey, Charlie Kuhbander kick (Drive: 9 plays, 75 yards, 3:28; Northwestern 7–0)
- (3:14) NU – John Raine 6 yard pass from Peyton Ramsey, Charlie Kuhbander kick (Drive: 10 plays, 68 yards, 4:21; Northwestern 14–0)

Second quarter

- (6:03) AUB – Anders Carlson 50 yard field goal (Drive: 8 plays, 20 yards, 2:36; Northwestern 14–3)
- (0:17) AUB – Anders Carlson 27 yard field goal (Drive: 15 plays, 72 yards, 3:45; Northwestern 14–6)

Third quarter

- (8:32) AUB – Elijah Canion 57 yard pass from Bo Nix, Anders Carlson kick (Drive: 6 plays, 75 yards, 2:10; Northwestern 14–13)
- (1:34) NU – Peyton Ramsey 30 yard rush, Charlie Kuhbander kick (Drive: 9 plays, 87 yards, 2:10; Northwestern 21–13)

Fourth quarter

- (12:13) NU – Cam Porter 1 yard rush, Charlie Kuhbander kick (Drive: 7 plays, 50 yards, 2:16; Northwestern 28–13)
- (7:49) NU – Riley Lees 8 yard pass from Peyton Ramsey, Charlie Kuhbander kick (Drive: 6 plays, 24 yards, 3:35; Northwestern 35–13)
- (4:41) AUB – D.J. Williams 2 yard rush, 2-point pass failed (Drive: 10 plays, 75 yards, 3:08; Northwestern 35–19)

Statistics	AUB	NU
First downs	19	25
Plays–yards	69-361	86-457
Rushes–yards	26-61	51-166
Passing yards	300	291
Passing: comp–att–int	26-43-0	24-35-0
Turnovers		
Time of possession	24:18	35:42

Team	Category	Player	Statistics
Auburn	Passing	Bo Nix	25/42, 292 yds, 1 TD
Auburn	Rushing	Bo Nix	10 carries, 32 yds
Auburn	Receiving	Elijah Canion	3 receptions, 80 yds, 1 TD
Northwestern	Passing	Peyton Ramsey	24/35, 291 yds, 3 TD
Northwestern	Rushing	Cam Porter	33 carries, 98 yds, 1 TD
Northwestern	Receiving	John Raine	6 receptions, 76 yds, 1 TD

== Rankings ==
Ranking movements Legend: ██ Increase in ranking ██ Decrease in ranking — = Not ranked RV = Received votes т = Tied with team above or below
	Week																
Poll	Pre	1	2	3	4	5	6	7	8	9	10	11	12	13	14	15	Final
AP	11	11*	8	8 T	7	13	15	RV	RV	24	24	23	22	RV	—	—	—
Coaches	11	11*	9	8	7	13	14	RV	RV	21	21	21	19	RV	—	—	—
CFP	Not released												22	—	—	—	Not released

== Players drafted into the NFL ==
Round	Pick	Player	Position	NFL Club
3	91	Anthony Schwartz	WR	Cleveland Browns
5	146	Jamien Sherwood	S	New York Jets
5	176	K. J. Britt	ILB	Tampa Bay Buccaneers
6	219	Seth Williams	WR	Denver Broncos
