= 2020 LSU Tigers football team =

American college football season

2020 LSU Tigers football
- Conference: Southeastern Conference
- West Division
- Record: 5–5 (5–5 SEC)
- Head coach: Ed Orgeron (4th season)
- Offensive coordinator: Steve Ensminger (3rd season)
- Offensive scheme: Spread
- Defensive coordinator: Bo Pelini (4th season)
- Base defense: 4–3
- Home stadium: Tiger Stadium

2020 Southeastern Conference football standings
	Conf.			Overall
Team	W		L	W		L
Eastern Division
No. 13 Florida x	8	–	2	8	–	4
No. 7 Georgia	7	–	2	8	–	2
Missouri	5	–	5	5	–	5
Kentucky	4	–	6	5	–	6
Tennessee*	3	–	7	3	–	7
South Carolina	2	–	8	2	–	8
Vanderbilt	0	–	9	0	–	9
Western Division
No. 1 Alabama x$#^	10	–	0	13	–	0
No. 4 Texas A&M	8	–	1	9	–	1
Auburn	6	–	4	6	–	5
LSU*	5	–	5	5	–	5
Ole Miss	4	–	5	5	–	5
Arkansas	3	–	7	3	–	7
Mississippi State	3	–	7	4	–	7
Championship: Alabama 52, Florida 46
# – College Football Playoff champion; ^ – College Football Playoff participant; $ – Conference champion; x – Division champion/co-champions; * – Tennessee vacated all wins due to NCAA violations. LSU was ineligible for postseason due to self imposed ban. Note: Due to COVID-19, the SEC played a conference-only schedule.; Rankings from AP Poll.

The 2020 LSU Tigers football team represented Louisiana State University in the 2020 NCAA Division I FBS football season. The Tigers played their home games at Tiger Stadium in Baton Rouge, Louisiana, and competed in the West Division of the Southeastern Conference (SEC). They were led by fourth year head coach Ed Orgeron.

The season was not an easy one for LSU, who were the defending national champions. After starting the year with a stunning home loss to Mississippi State, the Tigers were only able to string together five wins. In addition to losing a record 14 players to the NFL draft the year before, All-American wide receiver, Ja'Marr Chase opted out of play before the season. The Tigers also lost their starting quarterback, Myles Brennan, three games in and had to rely on true freshmen, TJ Finley and Max Johnson, for the remainder of the year. In spite of these obstacles, the Tigers managed to end the season on a positive note with wins over sixth-ranked Florida and Ole Miss, the former as a 24-point underdog. The Tigers also had a scheduled home game vs. Missouri switched to Columbia three days before kickoff due to the threat of Hurricane Delta along the Louisiana coast.

By comparison, LSU had already eclipsed more losses by their seventh game of the season than they had in all of 2018 and 2019 combined. Still, the victories over Florida and Ole Miss allowed LSU to avert its first losing season since 1999, when the Tigers went 3–8. The .500 season is the first for LSU since a 5–5–1 ledger in 1974.

On December 9, LSU announced a self-imposed bowl ban for the 2020 season. Although the Tigers did not finish the season with six wins, the NCAA removed bowl eligibility requirements for the 2020 bowl season. This self-imposed bowl ban was enacted due to an NCAA investigation at LSU over allegations of improper booster payments to their players.

== Preseason ==
=== SEC Media Days ===
In the preseason media poll, LSU was predicted to finish in second in the West Division behind Alabama. LSU received the second-most votes (tied with Georgia) to win the SEC Championship Game.

== Schedule ==
LSU Tigers announced its 2020 football schedule on August 7, 2019. The 2020 schedule originally consisted of 7 home, 4 away, and 1 neutral site game in the regular season.

The Tigers had games scheduled against Nicholls, Rice, Texas, and UTSA, which were all canceled due to the COVID-19 pandemic. Due to the Covid 19 Pandemic, LSU, like the other SEC members played a 10-game all conference schedule. The games vs. Vanderbilt and Missouri were not on the Tigers' original schedule.

Date	Time	Opponent	Rank	Site	TV	Result	Attendance
September 26	2:30 p.m.	Mississippi State	No. 6	Tiger Stadium; Baton Rouge, LA (rivalry)	CBS	L 34–44	21,124
October 3	6:30 p.m.	at Vanderbilt	No. 20	Vanderbilt Stadium; Nashville, TN	SECN	W 41–7	2,000
October 10	11:00 a.m.	at Missouri	No. 17	Faurot Field; Columbia, MO^{[a]}	SECN Alt.	L 41–45	10,013
October 24	6:00 p.m.	South Carolina		Tiger Stadium; Baton Rouge, LA	ESPN	W 52–24	21,855
October 31	2:30 p.m.	at Auburn		Jordan-Hare Stadium; Auburn, AL (Tiger Bowl)	CBS	L 11–48	17,490
November 21	11:00 a.m.	at Arkansas		Donald W. Reynolds Razorback Stadium; Fayetteville, AR (rivalry)	SECN	W 27–24	16,500
November 28	6:00 p.m.	at No. 5 Texas A&M		Kyle Field; College Station, TX (rivalry)	ESPN	L 7–20	23,607
December 5	7:00 p.m.	No. 1 Alabama		Tiger Stadium; Baton Rouge, LA (rivalry)	CBS	L 17–55	22,349
December 12^{[b]}	6:00 p.m.	at No. 5 Florida		Ben Hill Griffin Stadium; Gainesville, FL (rivalry)	ESPN	W 37–34	16,610
December 19	2:30 p.m.	Ole Miss		Tiger Stadium; Baton Rouge, LA (Magnolia Bowl)	SECN	W 53–48	21,905
Rankings from AP Poll and CFP Rankings (after November 24) released prior to game; All times are in Central time

^{^[a]}The game between LSU and Missouri was originally scheduled to take place in Baton Rouge. However, in light of Hurricane Delta, the game was moved to Columbia, Missouri.
^{^[b]}The game between LSU and Florida was originally scheduled to take place on October 17. However, due to COVID-19 management requirements in response to positive tests and subsequent quarantine of individuals within the Florida program, the game was rescheduled for December 12.
Schedule source:

== Game summaries ==
=== Mississippi State ===
Mississippi State at No. 6 LSU Tigers – Game summary

Quarter	1	2	3	4	Total
Bulldogs	3	14	10	17	44
No. 6 Tigers	0	14	10	10	34

at Tiger Stadium, Baton Rouge, Louisiana

- Date: September 26
- Game time: 2:30 p.m. CDT
- Game weather: Sunny, 85 °F (29 °C)
- Game attendance: 21,124
- Referee: Jason Autrey
- TV announcers (CBS): Brad Nessler, Gary Danielson, and Jamie Erdahl

Game information
First quarter
- MSST – Brandon Ruiz 35-yard field goal, 4:47. Bulldogs 3–0. Drive: 12 plays, 66 yards, 6:22.

Second quarter

- LSU – Jabril Cox 14-yard interception return (Cade York kick), 9:45. Tigers 7–3.
- MSST – Tyrell Shavers 31-yard pass from K. J. Costello (Brandon Ruiz kick), 7:45. Bulldogs 10–7. Drive: 6 plays, 75 yards, 2:00.
- LSU – Arik Gilbert 2-yard pass from Myles Brennan (Cade York kick), 5:20. Tigers 14–10. Drive: 8 plays, 84 yards, 2:19.
- MSST – Osirus Mitchell 43-yard pass from K. J. Costello (Brandon Ruiz kick), 2:27. Bulldogs 17–14. Drive: 7 plays, 75 yards, 2:53.

Third quarter

- LSU – Cade York 26-yard field goal, 9:33. Tied 17–17. Drive: 15 plays, 67 yards, 5:27.
- MSST – Brandon Ruiz 24-yard field goal, 6:23. Bulldogs 20–17. Drive: 9 plays, 69 yards, 3:10.
- LSU – Terrace Marshall Jr. 37-yard pass from Myles Brennan (Cade York kick), 5:01. Tigers 24–20. Drive: 5 plays, 75 yards, 1:22.
- MSST – Kylin Hill 75-yard pass from K. J. Costello (Brandon Ruiz kick), 4:46. Bulldogs 27–24. Drive: 1 play, 75 yards, 0:15.

Fourth quarter

- MSST – Austin Williams 9-yard pass from K. J. Costello (Brandon Ruiz kick), 14:14. Bulldogs 34–24. Drive: 5 plays, 56 yards, 1:44.
- LSU – Terrace Marshall Jr. 33-yard pass from Myles Brennan (Cade York kick), 11:01. Bulldogs 34–31. Drive: 3 plays, 45 yards, 0:52.
- LSU – Cade York 40-yard field goal, 9:37. Tied 34–34. Drive: 4 plays, 1 yard, 1:17.
- MSST – Brandon Ruiz 43-yard field goal, 7:27. Bulldogs 37–34. Drive: 7 plays, 50 yards, 2:10.
- MSST – Osirus Mitchell 24-yard pass from K. J. Costello (Brandon Ruiz kick), 3:39. Bulldogs 44–34. Drive: 7 plays, 71 yards, 2:36.

Statistics	MSST	LSU
First downs	24	25
Total yards	632	425
Rushing yards	9	80
Passing yards	623	345
Turnovers	4	2
Time of possession	30:28	29:32

Team	Category	Player	Statistics
Mississippi State	Passing	K. J. Costello	36/60, 623 yards, 5 TD, 2 INT
Mississippi State	Rushing	Kylin Hill	7 rushes, 34 yards
Mississippi State	Receiving	Osirus Mitchell	7 receptions, 183 yards, 2 TD
LSU	Passing	Myles Brennan	27/46, 345 yards, 3 TD, 2 INT
LSU	Rushing	Chris Curry	9 rushes, 47 yards
LSU	Receiving	Terrace Marshall Jr.	8 receptions, 122 yards, 2 TD

=== At Vanderbilt ===
No. 20 LSU Tigers at Vanderbilt Commodores – Game summary

Quarter	1	2	3	4	Total
No. 20 Tigers	7	14	13	7	41
Commodores	0	7	0	0	7

at Vanderbilt Stadium, Nashville, Tennessee

- Date: October 3
- Game time: 6:30 p.m. CDT
- Game weather: Clear, 66 °F (19 °C)
- Game attendance: 2,000
- Referee: Ken Williamson
- TV announcers (SECN): Tom Hart, Jordan Rodgers, and Cole Cubelic

Game information
First quarter
- LSU – Jontre Kirklin 28-yard pass from Myles Brennan (Cade York kick), 6:09. Tigers 7–0. Drive: 6 plays, 85 yards, 1:44.

Second quarter

- LSU – Terrace Marshall Jr. 16-yard pass from Myles Brennan (Cade York kick), 12:28. Tigers 14–0. Drive: 4 plays, 38 yards, 1:35.
- VAN – Ben Bresnahan 8-yard pass from Ken Seals (Pierson Cooke kick), 5:07. Tigers 14–7. Drive: 8 plays, 58 yards, 3:59.
- LSU – Terrace Marshall Jr. 51-yard pass from Myles Brennan (Cade York kick), 4:12. Tigers 21–7. Drive: 3 plays, 75 yards, 0:55.

Third quarter

- LSU – Cade York 53-yard field goal, 10:25. Tigers 24–7. Drive: 7 plays, 25 yards, 1:53.
- LSU – Cade York 31-yard field goal, 7:10. Tigers 27–7. Drive: 4 plays, 7 yards, 1:03.
- LSU – Jontre Kirklin 29-yard pass from Myles Brennan (Cade York kick), 0:46. Tigers 34–7. Drive: 9 plays, 85 yards, 3:29.

Fourth quarter

- LSU – John Emery Jr. 12-yard run (Cade York kick), 8:11. Tigers 41–7. Drive: 7 plays, 79 yards, 3:05.

Statistics	LSU	VAN
First downs	28	17
Total yards	498	266
Rushing yards	161	153
Passing yards	337	113
Turnovers	1	2
Time of possession	29:13	30:47

Team	Category	Player	Statistics
LSU	Passing	Myles Brennan	23/37, 337 yards, 4 TD, INT
LSU	Rushing	Chris Emery Jr.	12 rushes, 103 yards, TD
LSU	Receiving	Terrace Marshall Jr.	2 receptions, 67 yards, 2 TD
Vanderbilt	Passing	Ken Seals	11/25, 113 yards, TD, 2 INT
Vanderbilt	Rushing	Javeon Marlow	17 rushes, 83 yards
Vanderbilt	Receiving	Camron Johnson	3 receptions, 63 yards

=== At Missouri ===
No. 17 LSU Tigers at Missouri Tigers – Game summary

Quarter	1	2	3	4	Total
No. 17 LSU	14	10	17	0	41
Missouri	14	10	14	7	45

at Faurot Field, Columbia, Missouri

- Date: October 10
- Game time: 11:00 a.m. CDT
- Game weather: Pleasant, 74 °F (23 °C)
- Game attendance: 10,013
- Referee: Lee Hedrick
- TV announcers (SECN Alt.): Dave Flemming, Andre Ware, and Quint Kessenich

Game information
First quarter
- MIZ – Tauskie Dove 58-yard pass from Connor Bazelak (Harrison Mevis kick), 13:07. Missouri 7–0. Drive: 4 plays, 75 yards, 1:53.
- LSU – Terrace Marshall Jr. 6-yard pass from Myles Brennan (Cade York kick), 8:03. Tied 7–7. Drive: 10 plays, 75 yards, 5:04.
- LSU – Terrace Marshall Jr. 2-yard pass from Myles Brennan (Cade York kick), 3:45. LSU 14–7. Drive: 6 plays, 47 yards, 2:30.
- MIZ – Tyler Badie 29-yard run (Harrison Mevis kick), 0:22. Tied 14–14. Drive: 9 plays, 75 yards, 3:23.

Second quarter

- LSU – Arik Gilbert 25-yard pass from Myles Brennan (Cade York kick), 14:41. LSU 21–14. Drive: 1 play, 25 yards, 0:06.
- LSU – Cade York 42-yard field goal, 11:16. LSU 24–14. Drive: 4 plays, 7 yards, 1:01.
- MIZ – Jalen Knox 16-yard run (Harrison Mevis kick), 7:33. LSU 24–21. Drive: 9 plays, 75 yards, 3:43.
- MIZ – Harrison Mevis 52-yard field goal, 1:56. Tied 24–24. Drive: 9 plays, 40 yards, 4:30.

Third quarter

- LSU – Tyrion Davis-Price 1-yard run (Cade York kick), 12:25. LSU 31–24. Drive: 2 plays, 5 yards, 0:21.
- MIZ – Micah Wilson 41-yard pass from Connor Bazelak (Harrison Mevis kick), 10:46. Tied 31–31. Drive: 4 plays, 75 yards, 1:39.
- LSU – Terrace Marshall Jr. 75-yard pass from Myles Brennan (Cade York kick), 10:36. LSU 38–31. Drive: 1 play, 75 yards, 0:10.
- MIZ – Tyler Badie 21-yard pass from Connor Bazelak (Harrison Mevis kick), 2:36. Tied 38–38. Drive: 7 plays, 83 yards, 2:42.
- LSU – Cade York 51-yard field goal, 0:00. LSU 41–38. Drive: 6 plays, 42 yards, 2:36.

Fourth quarter

- MIZ – Niko Hea 5-yard pass from Connor Bazelak (Harrison Mevis kick), 5:18. Missouri 45–41. Drive: 4 plays, 77 yards, 1:46.

Statistics	LSU	MIZ
First downs	20	25
Total yards	479	586
Rushing yards	49	180
Passing yards	430	406
Turnovers	0	3
Time of possession	29:11	30:49

Team	Category	Player	Statistics
LSU	Passing	Myles Brennan	29/48, 430 yards, 4 TD
LSU	Rushing	Tyrion Davis-Price	9 rushes, 38 yards, TD
LSU	Receiving	Terrace Marshall Jr.	11 receptions, 235 yards, 3 TD
Missouri	Passing	Connor Bazelak	29/34, 406 yards, 4 TD
Missouri	Rushing	Larry Rountree III	18 rushes, 119 yards
Missouri	Receiving	Tauskie Dove	6 receptions, 83 yards, TD

=== South Carolina ===
South Carolina Gamecocks at LSU Tigers – Game summary

Quarter	1	2	3	4	Total
Gamecocks	7	3	7	7	24
Tigers	10	21	14	7	52

at Tiger Stadium, Baton Rouge, Louisiana

- Date: October 24
- Game time: 6:00 p.m. CDT
- Game weather: Cloudy, 66 °F (19 °C)
- Game attendance: 21,855
- Referee: Jason Autrey
- TV announcers (ESPN): Bob Wischusen and Dan Orlovsky

Game information
First quarter
- LSU – T. J. Finley 1-yard run (Cade York kick), 7:34. Tigers 7–0. Drive: 16 plays, 75 yards, 7:26.
- SC – Kevin Harris 45-yard run (Parker White kick), 6:40. Tied 7–7. Drive: 3 plays, 75 yards, 0:54.
- LSU – Cade York 27-yard field goal, 2:05. Tigers 10–7. Drive: 10 plays, 66 yards, 4:35.

Second quarter

- LSU – Terrace Marshall Jr. 7-yard pass from T. J. Finley (Cade York kick), 11:14. Tigers 17–7. Drive: 9 plays, 65 yards, 4:03.
- SC – Parker White 45-yard field goal, 5:22. Tigers 17–10. Drive: 4 plays, 7 yards, 1:25.
- LSU – Terrace Marshall Jr. 51-yard pass from T. J. Finley (Cade York kick), 3:43. Tigers 24–10. Drive: 5 plays, 75 yards, 1:39.
- LSU – Eli Ricks 45-yard interception return (Cade York kick), 2:43. Tigers 31–10.

Third quarter

- SC – Kevin Harris 1-yard run (Parker White kick), 11:17. Tigers 31–17. Drive: 9 plays, 74 yards, 3:43.
- LSU – Trey Palmer 93-yard kickoff return (Cade York kick), 11:00. Tigers 38–17.
- LSU – Tyrion Davis-Price 4-yard run (Cade York kick), 4:12. Tigers 45–17. Drive: 8 plays, 77 yards, 4:13.

Fourth quarter

- LSU – John Emery Jr. 3-yard run (Cade York kick), 9:44. Tigers 52–17. Drive: 10 plays, 58 yards, 5:09.
- SC – Josh Vann 5-yard pass from Collin Hill (Parker White kick), 7:39. Tigers 52–24. Drive: 7 plays, 75 yards, 2:05.

Statistics	SC	LSU
First downs	17	29
Total yards	403	541
Rushing yards	169	276
Passing yards	234	265
Turnovers	1	1
Time of possession	22:26	37:34

Team	Category	Player	Statistics
South Carolina	Passing	Collin Hill	12/22, 234 yards, TD, INT
South Carolina	Rushing	Kevin Harris	12 rushes, 126 yards, 2 TD
South Carolina	Receiving	Keveon Mullins	2 receptions, 101 yards
LSU	Passing	T. J. Finley	17/21, 265 yards, 2 TD, INT
LSU	Rushing	Tyrion Davis-Price	22 rushes, 135 yards, TD
LSU	Receiving	Terrace Marshall Jr.	6 receptions, 88 yards, 2 TD

=== At Auburn ===
LSU Tigers at Auburn Tigers – Game summary

Quarter	1	2	3	4	Total
LSU	0	3	0	8	11
Auburn	0	21	21	6	48

at Jordan-Hare Stadium, Auburn, Alabama

- Date: October 31
- Game time: 2:30 p.m. CDT
- Game weather: Sunny, 67 °F (19 °C)
- Game attendance: 17,490
- Referee: Alex Moore
- TV announcers (CBS): Brad Nessler, Gary Danielson, and Jamie Erdahl

Game information
First quarter
- No scoring plays

Second quarter

- AUB – Eli Stove 9-yard pass from Bo Nix (Anders Carlson kick), 12:13. Auburn 7–0. Drive: 1 play, 4 yards, 0:29.
- AUB – Christian Tutt 20-yard fumble return (Anders Carlson kick), 5:27. Auburn 14–0.
- AUB – Ze'Vian Capers 9-yard pass from Bo Nix (Anders Carlson kick), 0:40. Auburn 21–0. Drive: 8 plays, 99 yards, 2:56.
- LSU – Cade York 50-yard field goal, 0:00. Auburn 21–3. Drive: 5 plays, 32 yards, 0:40.

Third quarter

- AUB – Bo Nix 5-yard run (Anders Carlson kick), 11:35. Auburn 28–3. Drive: 8 plays, 75 yards, 3:25.
- AUB – Tank Bigsby 2-yard run (Anders Carlson kick), 8:55. Auburn 35–3. Drive: 5 plays, 21 yards, 2:34.
- AUB – Tank Bigsby 3-yard run (Anders Carlson kick), 1:33. Auburn 42–3. Drive: 12 plays, 69 yards, 5:21.

Fourth quarter

- AUB – Anthony Schwartz 91-yard pass from Bo Nix (kick failed), 14:37. Auburn 48–3. Drive: 1 play, 91 yards, 0:23.
- LSU – Kayshon Boutte 43-yard pass from Max Johnson (Max Johnson run), 8:43. Auburn 48–11. Drive: 4 plays, 71 yards, 1:16.

Statistics	LSU	AUB
First downs	20	23
Total yards	347	506
Rushing yards	32	206
Passing yards	315	300
Turnovers	3	1
Time of possession	28:31	31:29

Team	Category	Player	Statistics
LSU	Passing	Max Johnson	15/24, 172 yards, TD
LSU	Rushing	John Emery Jr.	9 rushes, 21 yards
LSU	Receiving	Arik Gilbert	6 receptions, 55 yards
Auburn	Passing	Bo Nix	18/24, 300 yards, 3 TD
Auburn	Rushing	Bo Nix	11 rushes, 81 yards, TD
Auburn	Receiving	Anthony Schwartz	4 receptions, 123 yards, TD

=== At Arkansas ===
LSU Tigers at Arkansas Razorbacks – Game summary

Quarter	1	2	3	4	Total
Tigers	3	17	0	7	27
Razorbacks	7	7	7	3	24

at Donald W. Reynolds Razorback Stadium, Fayetteville, Arkansas

- Date: November 21
- Game time: 11:00 a.m. CST
- Game weather: Cloudy, 63 °F (17 °C)
- Game attendance: 16,500
- Referee: Marc Curles
- TV announcers (SECN): Taylor Zarzour and Matt Stinchcomb

Game information
First quarter
- LSU – Cade York 49-yard field goal, 7:37. Tigers 3–0. Drive: 8 plays, 51 yards, 2:16.
- ARK – Treylon Burks 65-yard pass from Feleipe Franks (A. J. Reed kick), 3:40. Razorbacks 7–3. Drive: 4 plays, 92 yards, 1:05.

Second quarter

- LSU – Racey McMath 30-yard pass from T. J. Finley (Cade York kick), 13:54. Tigers 10–7. Drive: 10 plays, 75 yards, 4:46.
- LSU – Tyrion Davis-Price 1-yard run (Cade York kick), 4:21. Tigers 17–7. Drive: 1 play, 1 yard, 0:03.
- ARK – Feleipe Franks 10-yard run (A. J. Reed kick), 3:44. Tigers 17–14. Drive: 3 plays, 75 yards, 0:37.
- LSU – Cade York 24-yard field goal, 0:00. Tigers 20–14. Drive: 14 plays, 69 yards, 3:44.

Third quarter

- ARK – Trelon Smith 1-yard run (A. J. Reed kick), 1:04. Razorbacks 21–20. Drive: 6 plays, 95 yards, 1:30.

Fourth quarter

- ARK – A. J. Reed 22-yard field goal, 12:42. Razorbacks 24–20. Drive: 7 plays, 88 yards, 2:24.
- LSU – Jaray Jenkins 13-yard pass from T. J. Finley (Cade York kick), 3:59. Tigers 27–24. Drive: 9 plays, 67 yards, 3:31.

Statistics	LSU	ARK
First downs	24	14
Total yards	419	443
Rushing yards	148	104
Passing yards	271	339
Turnovers	1	1
Time of possession	41:43	18:17

Team	Category	Player	Statistics
LSU	Passing	T. J. Finley	27/42, 271 yards, 2 TD
LSU	Rushing	Tyrion Davis-Price	24 rushes, 104 yards, TD
LSU	Receiving	Terrace Marshall Jr.	7 receptions, 57 yards
Arkansas	Passing	Feleipe Franks	17/26, 339 yards, TD, INT
Arkansas	Rushing	Feleipe Franks	14 rushes, 43 yards, TD
Arkansas	Receiving	Michael Woods II	4 receptions, 140 yards

=== At No. 5 Texas A&M ===
LSU Tigers at No. 5 Texas A&M Aggies – Game summary

Quarter	1	2	3	4	Total
Tigers	0	0	0	7	7
No. 5 Aggies	10	3	7	0	20

at Kyle Field, College Station, Texas

- Date: November 28
- Game time: 6:00 p.m. CST
- Game weather: Steady rain, 57 °F (14 °C)
- Game attendance: 23,607
- Referee: Ken Williamson
- TV announcers (ESPN): Bob Wischusen and Dan Orlovsky

Game information
First quarter
- TAMU – Seth Small 41-yard field goal, 9:10. Aggies 3–0. Drive: 7 plays, 41 yards, 2:16.
- TAMU – Isaiah Spiller 52-yard run (Seth Small kick), 0:16. Aggies 10–0. Drive: 2 plays, 54 yards, 0:50.

Second quarter

- TAMU – Seth Small 40-yard field goal, 0:00. Aggies 13–0. Drive: 8 plays, 44 yards, 0:43.

Third quarter

- TAMU – Buddy Johnson 15-yard interception return (Seth Small kick), 4:36. Aggies 20–0.

Fourth quarter

- LSU – Terrace Marshall Jr. 3-yard pass from Max Johnson (Cade York kick), 0:38. Aggies 20–7. Drive: 14 plays, 81 yards, 4:31.

Statistics	LSU	TAMU
First downs	14	16
Total yards	267	267
Rushing yards	36	162
Passing yards	231	105
Turnovers	3	0
Time of possession	26:28	33:32

Team	Category	Player	Statistics
LSU	Passing	T. J. Finley	9/25, 118 yards, 2 INT
LSU	Rushing	Tyrion Davis-Price	11 rushes, 18 yards
LSU	Receiving	Terrace Marshall Jr.	10 receptions, 134 yards, TD
Texas A&M	Passing	Kellen Mond	11/34, 105 yards
Texas A&M	Rushing	Isaiah Spiller	28 rushes, 134 yards, TD
Texas A&M	Receiving	Ainias Smith	3 receptions, 36 yards

=== No. 1 Alabama ===
No. 1 Alabama Crimson Tide at LSU Tigers – Game summary

Quarter	1	2	3	4	Total
No. 1 Crimson Tide	21	24	7	3	55
Tigers	0	14	3	0	17

at Tiger Stadium, Baton Rouge, Louisiana

- Date: December 5
- Game time: 7:00 p.m. CST
- Game weather: Clear, 73 °F (23 °C)
- Game attendance: 22,349
- Referee: Alex Moore
- TV announcers (CBS): Brad Nessler, Gary Danielson, and Jamie Erdahl

Game information
First quarter
- ALA – Najee Harris 14-yard run (Will Reichard kick), 11:56. Crimson Tide 7–0. Drive: 7 plays, 75 yards, 3:04.
- ALA – Najee Harris 1-yard run (Will Reichard kick), 5:50. Crimson Tide 14–0. Drive: 5 plays, 85 yards, 2:02.
- ALA – Jahleel Billingsley 24-yard pass from Mac Jones (Will Reichard kick), 2:27. Crimson Tide 21–0. Drive: 5 plays, 47 yards, 2:12.

Second quarter

- LSU – Jontre Kirklin 0-yard fumble return (Cade York kick), 14:53. Crimson Tide 21–7.
- ALA – DeVonta Smith 65-yard pass from Mac Jones (Will Reichard kick), 13:36. Crimson Tide 28–7. Drive: 3 plays, 75 yards, 1:17.
- LSU – John Emery Jr. 54-yard run (Cade York kick), 12:32. Crimson Tide 28–14. Drive: 3 plays, 69 yards, 1:04.
- ALA – DeVonta Smith 61-yard pass from Mac Jones (Will Reichard kick), 11:14. Crimson Tide 35–14. Drive: 3 plays, 75 yards, 1:18.
- ALA – Will Reichard 30-yard field goal, 3:20. Crimson Tide 38–14. Drive: 11 plays, 77 yards, 5:18.
- ALA – DeVonta Smith 20-yard pass from Mac Jones (Will Reichard kick), 0:46. Crimson Tide 45–14. Drive: 6 plays, 58 yards, 1:38.

Third quarter

- ALA – Najee Harris 11-yard run (Will Reichard kick), 3:39. Crimson Tide 52–14. Drive: 6 plays, 34 yards, 3:19.
- LSU – Cade York 52-yard field goal, 0:31. Crimson Tide 52–17. Drive: 10 plays, 41 yards, 3:08.

Fourth quarter

- ALA – Will Reichard 34-yard field goal, 10:50. Crimson Tide 55–17. Drive: 10 plays, 29 yards, 4:41.

Statistics	ALA	LSU
First downs	32	21
Total yards	650	352
Rushing yards	265	98
Passing yards	385	254
Turnovers	1	1
Time of possession	33:17	26:43

Team	Category	Player	Statistics
Alabama	Passing	Mac Jones	20/28, 385 yards, 4 TD
Alabama	Rushing	Najee Harris	21 rushes, 145 yards, 3 TD
Alabama	Receiving	DeVonta Smith	8 receptions, 231 yards, 3 TD
LSU	Passing	T. J. Finley	14/28, 144 yards, TD
LSU	Rushing	John Emery Jr.	7 rushes, 79 yards, TD
LSU	Receiving	Kayshon Boutte	8 receptions, 111 yards

=== At No. 5 Florida ===
LSU Tigers at No. 5 Florida Gators – Game summary

Quarter	1	2	3	4	Total
Tigers	7	17	3	10	37
No. 5 Gators	7	10	14	3	34

at Ben Hill Griffin Stadium, Gainesville, Florida

- Date: December 12
- Game time: 6:00 p.m. CST / 7:00 p.m. EST
- Game weather: Cloudy and humid, 64 °F (18 °C)
- Game attendance: 16,610
- Referee: James Carter
- TV announcers (ESPN): Sean McDonough, Todd Blackledge, and Todd McShay

Game information
First quarter
- FLA – Kyle Trask 1-yard run (Evan McPherson kick), 8:01. Gators 7–0. Drive: 5 plays, 52 yards, 1:27.
- LSU – Jaray Jenkins 5-yard pass from Max Johnson (Cade York kick), 4:21. Tied 7–7. Drive: 11 plays, 75 yards, 3:40.

Second quarter

- LSU – Eli Ricks 68-yard interception return (Cade York kick), 12:59. Tigers 14–7.
- FLA – Evan McPherson 23-yard field goal, 6:25. Tigers 14–10. Drive: 9 plays, 44 yards, 3:01.
- FLA – Jacob Copeland 19-yard pass from Kyle Trask (Evan McPherson kick), 2:25. Gators 17–14. Drive: 7 plays, 66 yards, 2:41.
- LSU – Kayshon Boutte 34-yard pass from Max Johnson (Cade York kick), 0:33. Tigers 21–17. Drive: 9 plays, 75 yards, 1:52.
- LSU – Cade York 39-yard field goal, 0:00. Tigers 24–17. Drive: 2 plays, -2 yards, 0:10.

Third quarter

- LSU – Cade York 30-yard field goal, 8:29. Tigers 27–17. Drive: 17 plays, 63 yards, 6:31.
- FLA – Kyle Trask 1-yard run (Evan McPherson kick), 6:52. Tigers 27–24. Drive: 4 plays, 75 yards, 1:37.
- FLA – Kadarius Toney 9-yard pass from Kyle Trask (Evan McPherson kick), 3:11. Gators 31–27. Drive: 5 plays, 81 yards, 2:05.

Fourth quarter

- LSU – Tre Bradford 4-yard pass from Max Johnson (Cade York kick), 13:14. Tigers 34–31. Drive: 9 plays, 84 yards, 3:09.
- FLA – Evan McPherson 31-yard field goal, 2:51. Tied 34–34. Drive: 7 plays, 72 yards, 2:58.
- LSU – Cade York 57-yard field goal, 0:23. Tigers 37–34. Drive: 9 plays, 36 yards, 2:28.

Statistics	LSU	FLA
First downs	24	26
Total yards	418	609
Rushing yards	179	135
Passing yards	239	474
Turnovers	0	3
Time of possession	31:54	28:06

Team	Category	Player	Statistics
LSU	Passing	Max Johnson	21/36, 239 yards, 3 TD
LSU	Rushing	Chris Curry	17 rushes, 64 yards
LSU	Receiving	Kayshon Boutte	5 receptions, 108 yards, TD
Florida	Passing	Kyle Trask	29/47, 474 yards, 2 TD, 2 INT
Florida	Rushing	Malik Davis	7 rushes, 81 yards
Florida	Receiving	Kadarius Toney	9 receptions, 182 yards, TD

=== Ole Miss ===
Ole Miss Rebels at LSU Tigers – Game summary

Quarter	1	2	3	4	Total
Rebels	7	14	13	14	48
Tigers	10	24	6	13	53

at Tiger Stadium, Baton Rouge, Louisiana

- Date: December 19
- Game time: 2:30 p.m. CST
- Game weather: Cloudy, 68 °F (20 °C)
- Game attendance: 21,905
- Referee: Jason Autrey
- TV announcers (SECN): Taylor Zarzour and Matt Stinchcomb

Game information
First quarter
- MISS – Braylon Sanders 20-yard pass from Matt Corral (Luke Logan kick), 11:18. Rebels 7–0. Drive: 6 plays, 85 yards, 2:13.
- LSU – Cade York 34-yard field goal, 5:35. Rebels 7–3. Drive: 7 plays, 15 yards, 2:09.
- LSU – Jay Ward 31-yard interception return (Cade York kick), 5:26. Tigers 10–7.

Second quarter

- LSU – Max Johnson 1-yard run (Cade York kick), 12:17. Tigers 17–7. Drive: 9 plays, 86 yards, 3:33.
- MISS – Jerrion Early 100-yard kickoff return (Luke Logan kick), 12:03. Tigers 17–14.
- LSU – Kayshon Boutte 32-yard pass from Max Johnson (Cade York kick), 4:50. Tigers 24–14. Drive: 4 plays, 40 yards, 1:22.
- MISS – Henry Parrish Jr. 1-yard run (Luke Logan kick), 3:07. Tigers 24–21. Drive: 6 plays, 61 yards, 1:33.
- LSU – Kayshon Boutte 18-yard pass from Max Johnson (Cade York kick), 0:58. Tigers 31–21. Drive: 9 plays, 75 yards, 2:09.
- LSU – Cade York 34-yard field goal, 0:02. Tigers 34–21. Drive: 4 plays, 3 yards, 0:21.

Third quarter

- LSU – Cade York 23-yard field goal, 9:50. Tigers 37–21. Drive: 11 plays, 39 yards, 4:19.
- MISS – Henry Parrish Jr. 10-yard run (run failed), 8:11. Tigers 37–27. Drive: 5 plays, 65 yards, 1:39.
- MISS – Dontario Drummond 5-yard pass from Matt Corral (Luke Logan kick), 4:03. Tigers 37–34. Drive: 8 plays, 77 yards, 2:44.
- LSU – Cade York 50-yard field goal, 2:16. Tigers 40–34. Drive: 6 plays, 48 yards, 1:45.

Fourth quarter

- MISS – Braylon Sanders 25-yard pass from Matt Corral (Luke Logan kick), 14:53. Rebels 41–40. Drive: 6 plays, 67 yards, 2:15.
- MISS – Matt Corral 2-yard run (Luke Logan kick), 8:43. Rebels 48–40. Drive: 11 plays, 80 yards, 3:52.
- LSU – Max Johnson 1-yard run (pass failed), 5:31. Rebels 48–46. Drive: 10 plays, 75 yards, 3:03.
- LSU – Kayshon Boutte 45-yard pass from Max Johnson (Cade York kick), 1:34. Tigers 53–48. Drive: 3 plays, 56 yards, 1:02.

Statistics	MISS	LSU
First downs	25	29
Total yards	558	593
Rushing yards	307	158
Passing yards	251	435
Turnovers	6	1
Time of possession	26:45	33:15

Team	Category	Player	Statistics
Ole Miss	Passing	Matt Corral	15/27, 251 yards, 3 TD, 5 INT
Ole Miss	Rushing	Matt Corral	17 rushes, 158 yards, TD
Ole Miss	Receiving	Braylon Sanders	4 receptions, 70 yards, 2 TD
LSU	Passing	Max Johnson	27/51, 435 yards, 3 TD, INT
LSU	Rushing	Josh Williams	12 rushes, 55 yards
LSU	Receiving	Kayshon Boutte	14 receptions, 308 yards, 3 TD

== Personnel ==
=== Coaching staff ===
Current staff as of February 10, 2020

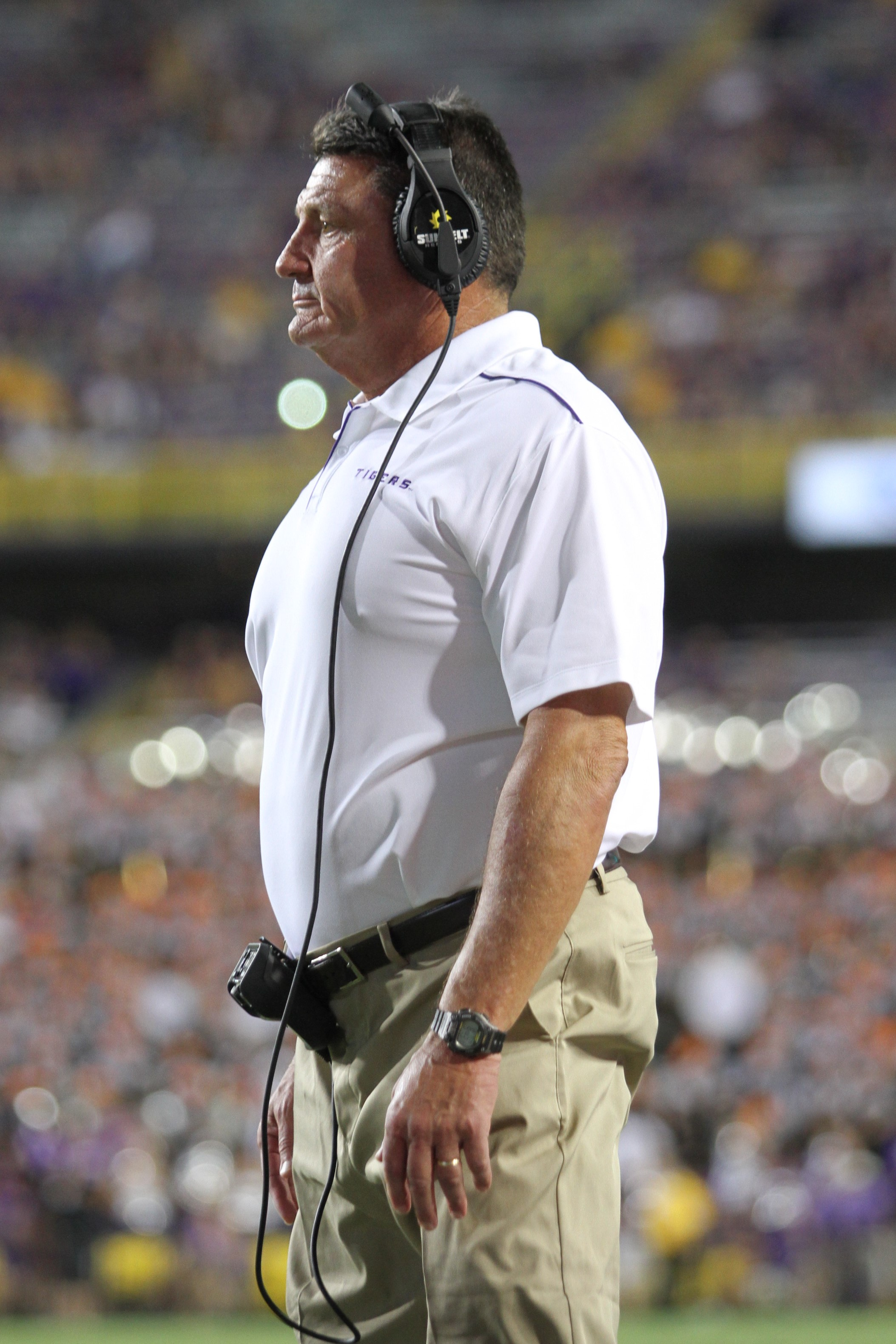
Head Coach Ed Orgeron

Name	Position
Ed Orgeron	Head coach
Steve Ensminger	Offensive coordinator/quarterbacks coach
Bo Pelini	Defensive coordinator/linebackers coach
Scott Linehan	Passing game coordinator
James Cregg	Offensive line coach/running game coordinator
Mickey Joseph	Wide receivers coach/assistant head coach
Kevin Faulk	Running backs coach
Bill Johnson	Defensive line coach
Corey Raymond	Cornerbacks coach/recruiting coordinator
Bill Busch	Safeties coach
Greg McMahon	Special teams coordinator
Tommy Moffitt	Strength and conditioning coordinator
Russ Callaway	Senior offensive assistant & analyst
Donald D'Alesio	Defensive analyst

=== Roster ===
2020 LSU Tigers football roster
Quarterbacks: 11 – T. J. Finley – freshman (6'6, 242); 12 – Walker Kinney* – freshman (6'2, 223); 14 – Max Johnson – freshman (6'5, 219); 15 – Myles Brennan – junior (6'4, 210); 16 – A. J. Aycock* – sophomore (6'4, 217); Running backs: 3 – Tyrion Davis-Price – sophomore (6'1, 232); 4 – John Emery Jr. – sophomore (5'11, 215); 8 – Tre Bradford – sophomore (6'0, 190); 18 – Chris Curry – sophomore (5'11, 216); 23 – Corren Norman – (redshirt) freshman (5'9, 195); 26 – Keenen Dunn* – sophomore (5'11, 183); 27 – Josh Williams – (redshirt) freshman (5'9, 195); 81 – Nick Demas – freshman (5'11, 202); Fullback: 44 – Tory Carter* – senior (6'0, 244); Wide receivers: 1 – Kayshon Boutte – freshman (6'0, 185); 2 – Koy Moore – freshman (6'0, 174); 6 – Terrace Marshall Jr.* – junior (6'3, 200); 7 – Ja'Marr Chase* – junior (6'0, 208); 10 – Jaray Jenkins – sophomore (6'2, 200); 12 – Alex Adams – freshman (6'0, 196); 13 – Jontre Kirklin – senior (6'0, 184); 16 – Devonta Lee – sophomore (6'2, 224); 17 – Racey McMath* – senior (6'3, 224); 28 – Nick Rocha* – freshman (6'1, 164); 29 – Ethan Laing – freshman (5'11, 176); 33 – Trey Palmer – sophomore (6'0, 180); 86 – Michael Martin* – sophomore (5'10, 185); 88 – Evan Francioni – sophomore (5'11, 194); Placekickers: 32 – Avery Atkins – junior (5'11, 214); 36 – Cade York – sophomore (6'1, 198); 39 – Ezekeal Mata – freshman (5'11, 180); 43 – Preston Stafford – sophomore (5'10, 174); Punters: 32 – Avery Atkins – junior (5'11, 214); 38 – Zach Von Rosenberg* – senior (6'5, 245)	Tight ends: 2 – Arik Gilbert* – freshman (6'5, 249); 30 – Jack Mashburn – freshman (6'2, 218); 42 – Aaron Moffitt – junior (6'2, 237); 45 – Stephen King – sophomore (6'6, 257); 46 – Charlie Drost – freshman (6'4, 236); 49 – Jansen Mayea* – sophomore (6'2, 245); 82 – Brandon Hubicz* – freshman (6'2, 227); 84 – T. K. McLendon* – junior (6'3, 269); 85 – Nick Storz – sophomore (6'5, 260); 87 – Kole Taylor – freshman (6'7, 243); Offensive linemen: 56 – Liam Shanahan – senior (6'5, 304); 57 – Chasen Hines – junior (6'3, 349); 62 – Siaki Ika* – sophomore (6'4, 340); 64 – Austin Harden* – freshman (6'1, 286); 70 – Ed Ingram – junior (6'3, 315); 71 – Xavier Hill – freshman (6'3, 307); 85 – Ray Parker* – freshman (6'5, 245); Defensive linemen: 3 – Andre Anthony – senior (6'3, 255); 8 – BJ Ojulari – freshman (6'2, 230); 11 – Ali Gaye – junior (6'6, 262); 47 – Nelson Jenkins III* – sophomore (6'4, 300); 49 – Travez Moore* – senior (6'4, 242); 53 – Soni Fonua – junior (6'3, 268); 55 – Jarell Cherry – sophomore (6'2, 277); 72 – Tyler Shelvin* – junior (6'3, 346); 90 – Jacobian Guillory II – freshman (6'2, 344); 92 – Neil Farrell – senior (6'4, 319); 93 – Justin Thomas* – junior (6'5, 290); 94 – Joseph Evans – freshman (6'1, 319); 96 – Eric Taylor* – freshman (6'4, 313); 97 – Glen Logan – senior (6'3, 339); 99 – Jaquelin Roy – freshman (6'4, 302)	Linebackers: 12 – Donte Starks* – freshman (6'1, 217); 19 – Jabril Cox* – senior (6'4, 231); 41 – Carlton Smith* – junior (6'3, 237); 43 – Ray Thornton* – senior (6'3, 225); Cornerbacks: 1 – Eli Ricks – freshman (6'2, 196); 2 – Dwight McGlothern – freshman (6'2, 182); 5 – Kary Vincent Jr. – senior (5'10, 189); 21 – Jordan Toles – freshman (6'0, 199); 24 – Derek Stingley Jr. – sophomore (6'1, 195); 25 – Cordale Flott – sophomore (6'1, 165); 26 – Darren Evans – senior (6'3, 180); 28 – Lloyd Cole – senior (6'0, 205); 29 – Raydarius Jones – freshman (6'2, 170); Safeties: 4 – Todd Harris Jr. – (redshirt) junior (6'1, 195); 5 – Jay Ward – sophomore (6'1, 176); 7 – JaCoby Stevens* – senior (6'2, 230); 14 – Maurice Hampton Jr. – sophomore (6'0, 215); 22 – Zaven Fountain – sophomore (6'3, 186); 31 – Cameron Lewis – senior (6'1, 195); Long snappers: 47 – Max Peterson – freshman (5'11, 213); 48 – Quentin Skinner – freshman (6'0, 243)
Source (November 25, 2025) * Denotes a player that opted out for all or part of the season.

== Rankings ==
Ranking movements Legend: ██ Increase in ranking ██ Decrease in ranking — = Not ranked RV = Received votes ( ) = First-place votes
	Week																	
Poll	Pre	1	2	3	4	5	6	7	8	9	10	11	12	13	14	15	16	Final
AP	6 (1)	6*	6 (1)	6 (1)	20	17	RV	—	—	—	—	—	—	—	—	—	—	—
Coaches	5	5*	5 (3)	5 (1)	17	16	RV	—	—	—	—	—	—	—	—	—	—	—
CFP	Not released												—	—	—	—	—	Not released

== Players drafted into the NFL ==
Round	Pick	Player	Position	NFL Club
1	5	Ja'Marr Chase	WR	Cincinnati Bengals
2	59	Terrace Marshall Jr.	WR	Carolina Panthers
4	115	Jabril Cox	ILB	Dallas Cowboys
4	122	Tyler Shelvin	DT	Cincinnati Bengals
6	205	Racey McMath	WR	Tennessee Titans
6	224	JaCoby Stevens	S	Philadelphia Eagles
7	237	Kary Vincent Jr.	CB	Denver Broncos
