= Conrad Nix =

American football coach and administrator (born 1945)

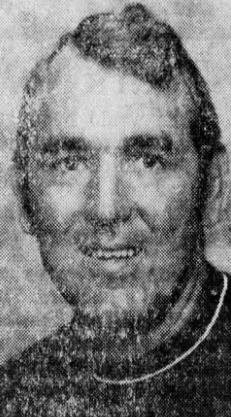
- Nix c. 1973

Biographical details
- Born: c. 1945 (age 80–81); Oneonta, Alabama, U.S.
- Education: Auburn University; Georgia Southwestern College

Playing career

Football
- 1963–1964: Howard (AL)

Baseball
- 1965: Snead
- Position: Tackle (football)

Coaching career (HC unless noted)

Football
- 1966: Pepperell Dragons
- 1967–1968: Warner Robins HS (GA) (line)
- 1969–1970: Lincoln HS (AL)
- 1971–1972: Irwin County HS (GA)
- 1973–1980: Northside HS (GA)
- 1981–1982: Haleyville HS (AL)
- 1983 (spring): Bradley Central HS (TN)
- 1983–1984: Haleyville HS (AL)
- 1985: Fayette County HS (GA)
- 1986–1987: Albertville HS (AL)
- 1988–1990: Etowah HS (AL) (OC)
- 1994–2009: Northside HS (GA)

Baseball
- 1966: Civitan Dragons

Tennis
- 1968: Warner Robins HS (GA)

Administrative career (AD unless noted)
- 1969–1971: Lincoln HS (AL)
- 1971–1973: Irwin County HS (GA)
- 1973–1981: Northside HS (GA)
- 1985–1986: Fayette County HS (GA)
- 1986–1988: Albertville HS (AL)
- 1994–2010: Northside HS (GA)

Head coaching record
- Overall: 299–109–1 (high school football)

Conrad Nix (born c. 1945) is an American former high school football coach and administrator. He was the head football coach for Lincoln High School from 1969 to 1970, Irwin County High School from 1971 to 1972, Northside High School from 1973 to 1980 and from 1994 to 2009, Haleyville High School from 1981 to 1984, Fayette County High School in 1985, and Albertville High School from 1986 to 1987. He amassed an overall record of 299–109–1.

Nix is the father of former Auburn quarterback and college football coach Patrick Nix and the grandfather of Bo Nix who was the Denver Broncos first round pick in the 2024 NFL draft.

== Early life and playing career ==
Nix was born in 1945 in Oneonta, Alabama. He attended Oneonta High School and played high school football. He was selected as an All-County lineman after his senior season. After graduating in 1963, Nix enrolled at Howard College—now known as Samford University—as a tackle. He played two seasons with Howard before transferring to Snead Seminary (College)—now known as Snead State Community College. He played baseball for the Parsons.

Nix received his bachelor's degree in physical education from Auburn University. He also received his master's degree from Georgia Southwestern College.

== Coaching career ==
Nix began coaching peewee baseball in 1966 for the Civitan Dragons. He also coached peewee football for the Pepperell Dragons. In 1967, he was hired as the line coach and head boys and girls tennis coach for Warner Robins High School.

Nix spent two seasons with Warner Robins before being hired as the athletic director and head football coach for Lincoln High School in Alabama. He succeeded Julius Head. He took over a team that finished the previous season with a 1–9 overall record. In his inaugural season, he led the team to a 5–4–1 record in what was supposed to be a "rebuilding year." His team ran the two-platoon system. In two seasons, Nix amassed an overall record of 14–7–1, including a 9–3 season in 1970 that ended in a playoff appearance just two seasons after the team won just one game. In 1971, he was hired as the athletic director and head football coach for Irwin County High School in Georgia. He led the team to a 7–3 record in his first season. In his second season his team recorded 11 straight victories and ended with a playoff loss to Mitchell County High School, ending his two-year tenure with the school was an overall record of 18–4. After his 11–1 1972 season, Nix was named as The Macon News All-Middle Georgia Coach of the Year.

In 1973, Nix was hired as the athletic director and head football coach for Northside High School. In 1975, he led the Eagles to their first win over cross-town rival, and Nix's former team, Warner Robins since 1967 after beating them 20–18. Also in 1975, the team finished with its best record ever as they finished with an overall record of 10–1. In the following season, only ten of the team's 22 starters returned, of that three of which being seniors. Despite that, the team began the 1976 season winning their first seven games including five-consecutive shutouts before losing the remaining three games of the season. In 1978, Nix won his second region title after finishing the regular season with an undefeated record of 10–0 before falling in the playoffs. Due to his success with Northside, he considering accepting the position of head coach for Southwest High School in Macon, Georgia, but Nix ultimately stayed with Northside. After the 1980 season, he resigned to accept a position elsewhere, ending his tenure with Northside with an overall record of 64–19 and never finishing with a losing record.

After Nix's resignation for Northside was official, he returned to Alabama and began his duties as athletic director and head football coach for Haleyville High School, replacing Larry Burleson. In his first season with the school, he finished a season with a losing season for the first time ever under his leadership as the team finished with a 3–7 record. In 1983, Nix was hired as the head football coach for Bradley Central High School in Cleveland, Tennessee, but resigned just three weeks later and returned to Haleyville. His tenure with Haleyville ended after a 1–9 season in 1984, finishing with an overall record of 15–25. He spent the 1985–86 school year as the athletic director and head football coach for Fayette County High School. In his lone season, the school went 1–9.

In 1986, at the recommendation of Albertville City School District's superintendent John Schaerer, Nix was hired as the athletic director and head football coach for Albertville High School, replacing Vernon Wells. Nix finished his first season with the school going 4–7. Heading into his second year, the team returned 26 lettermen but returned 12 starters. He led the team to a 6–5 record and a share of the region title. After the season, he was dismissed from his position as head football coach but remained on the school staff as athletic director. A group of 25 people gathered and rallied for Nix to be reinstated as the football coach. Alongside the group of people, around 450 had signed a petition in support of Nix which was brought to the Albertville City Council and Albertville Board of Education. The goal was to get Nix his job back, a three-year contract extension, a "chance to do his job," and to properly staff the football team. Despite all the support for him, Nix was dismissed entirely in May 1988 of his position as athletic director and teacher as his contract was not to be renewed. In June 1988, Nix was named as a finalist for the head coaching position for Lee High School, though he ultimately did not get the position.

From 1988 to 1990, Nix was the offensive coordinator, his first assistant coaching position, for Etowah High School where he coached his youngest son, Patrick Nix, who was the team's quarterback. Nix retired from coaching after the 1990 season but remained at Etowah as a biology teacher. In 1994, he returned to coaching as he was hired as the athletic director and head football coach for Northside High School, where he had coached from 1973 to 1980. He replaced Stan Gann, who resigned after his second heart attack in two years. In a 12 year span from 1990 to 2005, Northside finished with more than three losses only three times and won seven region titles. In 2006, Nix led Northside to his first-ever state championship after defeating Marist School 30–6 and finishing with an undefeated 15–0 record. In 2007, Northside extended its win streak to 30-straight games as the team finished going 15–0 and won its second-consecutive state championship over Ware County High School. In 24-combined years as head coach for Northside, Nix never led the team to a losing record. He retired after the 2009 season with a record of 241–51 with Northside and an overall head coaching record of 299–109–1.

In 2021, Nix was honored by Northside with a seven-on-seven passing camp.

== Personal life ==
Patrick Nix, son of Nix and his wife Patsy, was the starting quarterback for Auburn in 1994 and 1995. Patrick also served as the head football coach for Henderson State University from 1999 to 2000. Patrick's son and Conrad's grandson Bo was selected by the Denver Broncos 12th overall in the 2024 NFL draft. Patrick's adopted son Tez Johnson also played wide receiver for the Tampa Bay Buccaneers.

== Head coaching record ==
=== High school football ===
| Year | Team | Overall | Conference | Standing | Bowl/playoffs |
|---|---|---|---|---|---|
Lincoln Golden Bears () (1969–1970)
| 1969 | Lincoln | 5–4–1 | | | |
| 1970 | Lincoln | 9–3 | | | |
| Lincoln: | | 14–7–1 | | | |
Irwin County Indians () (1971–1972)
| 1971 | Irwin County | 7–3 | 2–2 | 3rd (South) | |
| 1972 | Irwin County | 11–1 | 7–0 | 1st | |
| Irwin County: | | 18–4 | 9–2 | | |
Northside Eagles () (1973–1980)
| 1973 | Northside | 7–3 | 6–2 | 3rd | |
| 1974 | Northside | 8–2 | 6–2 | 3rd | |
| 1975 | Northside | 10–1 | 8–0 | 1st | |
| 1976 | Northside | 7–3 | 5–3 | T–3rd | |
| 1977 | Northside | 6–4 | 5–3 | 4th | |
| 1978 | Northside | 10–1 | 8–0 | 1st | |
| 1979 | Northside | 8–2 | 7–1 | 2nd | |
| 1980 | Northside | 8–3 | 3–1 | 2nd (East) | |
Haleyville Lions () (1981–1984)
| 1981 | Haleyville | 3–7 | 1–3 | 4th | |
| 1982 | Haleyville | 5–5 | 2–2 | 3rd | |
| 1983 | Haleyville | 6–4 | 1–3 | 4th | |
| 1984 | Haleyville | 1–9 | 0–4 | 5th | |
| Haleyville: | | 15–25 | 4–12 | | |
Fayette County Tigers () (1985)
| 1985 | Fayette County | 1–9 | 1–8 | 9th | |
| Fayette County: | | 1–9 | 1–8 | | |
Albertville Aggies () (1986–1987)
| 1986 | Albertville | 4–7 | 1–2 | T–2nd | |
| 1987 | Albertville | 6–5 | 2–1 | T–1st | |
| Albertville: | | 10–12 | 3–3 | | |
Northside Eagles () (1994–2009)
| 1994 | Northside | 10–3 | 7–2 | T–2nd | |
| 1995 | Northside | 6–5 | 6–3 | T–3rd | |
| 1996 | Northside | 6–5 | 6–1 | T–1st | |
| 1997 | Northside | 9–4 | 6–1 | T–1st | |
| 1998 | Northside | 12–1 | 5–0 | 1st (Division B) | |
| 1999 | Northside | 13–1 | 5–0 | 1st (Division B) | |
| 2000 | Northside | 10–2 | 6–1 | 2nd | |
| 2001 | Northside | 13–1 | 7–0 | 1st | |
| 2002 | Northside | 10–3 | 7–2 | T–2nd | |
| 2003 | Northside | 11–1 | 9–0 | 1st | |
| 2004 | Northside | 10–2 | 4–1 | 2nd (South) | |
| 2005 | Northside | 14–1 | 5–0 | 1st (South) | |
| 2006 | Northside | 15–0 | 6–0 | 1st (Division B) | |
| 2007 | Northside | 15–0 | 6–0 | 1st (Division B) | |
| 2008 | Northside | 10–2 | 6–1 | 2nd | |
| 2009 | Northside | 13–2 | 6–1 | T–1st | |
| Northside: | | 241–52 | 145–25 | | |
| Total: | | 299–109–1 | | | |
National championship Conference title Conference division title or championship game berth
