= Patrick Nix =

American football player & coach

Biographical details
- Born: Attalla, Alabama, U.S.

Playing career
- 1992–1995: Auburn
- Position: Quarterback

Coaching career (HC unless noted)
- 1996: Jacksonville State (RB)
- 1997–1998: Jacksonville State (QB)
- 1999–2000: Henderson State
- 2001: Samford (WR)
- 2002–2006: Georgia Tech (RB/QB/OC)
- 2007–2008: Miami (FL) (OC)
- 2010: Charleston Southern (WR/RC)
- 2011–2012: Charleston Southern (OC/WR/RC)
- 2013–2016: Scottsboro HS (AL)
- 2017–2020: Pinson Valley HS (AL)
- 2020–2026: Phenix City Central HS (AL)

Head coaching record
- Overall: 3–19 (college); 131–36 (high school)

Patrick Nix is an American football coach and former player who served as the head coach of Central High School in Phenix City, Alabama from 2020 to 2026. He played college football as a quarterback at Auburn University from 1992 to 1995.

== Playing career ==
Nix played high school football at Etowah High School in Attalla, Alabama. He then attended Auburn University, where he was a standout quarterback for the Auburn Tigers. He came in for an injured Stan White against Alabama to help lead the Tigers to a perfect 11–0 record during his sophomore season in 1993. Nix graduated in 1995 as the school's career leader in passing efficiency. At Auburn, Nix played under head coach Terry Bowden; offensive coordinator Tommy Bowden, future head coach for Clemson; and quarterbacks coach Jimbo Fisher, former head coach at Florida State and Texas A&M. Nix holds the Auburn passing record for the most pass completions in a game with 34 completions against Arkansas.

== Coaching career ==
=== Georgia Tech ===
In 2002, Nix joined the coaching staff at Georgia Tech. Nix was Tech's running backs coach and recruiting coordinator during his first year. In 2003, he served as quarterbacks coach and running game coordinator. In 2004, he was elevated to offensive coordinator while continuing on as quarterbacks coach. For 2005, Nix's offense boasted both the ACC's leading rusher (Tashard Choice) and its leading receiver (Calvin Johnson). Prior to the 2006 season, Nix assumed full play-calling duties. Tech would go on to make appearances in the ACC Championship Game and the Gator Bowl.

=== Miami ===
In January 2007, Nix was hired by Miami to serve as offensive coordinator under head coach Randy Shannon.

=== Charleston Southern ===
In July 2010, Nix was hired as the wide receivers coach for Charleston Southern. Charleston Southern officially announced this July 28, 2010.

=== Central High School ===
In 2020, Patrick Nix became the head coach at Central High School in Phenix City, Alabama. During his six seasons, Nix compiled a 65–14 record overall, leading the Red Devils to the state playoffs in each season. His teams won four region titles and three state title game appearances, including a state championship in 2023.

== Personal life ==
Nix is the son of Conrad Nix and Patsy Nix. Conrad is a retired high school football coach with almost 300 wins and two state championships. He retired in 2009 from Northside High School in Warner Robins, Georgia. Nix is married to the former Krista Chapman, and the couple has four children. Nix's eldest son Bo was selected by the Denver Broncos 12th overall in the 2024 NFL draft. His youngest son, Caleb, plays safety at Jacksonville State while an adopted son, Tez Johnson, plays wide receiver for the Tampa Bay Buccaneers.

== Head coaching record ==
=== College ===
Year	Team	Overall	Conference	Standing	Bowl/playoffs
Henderson State Reddies (Gulf South Conference) (1999–2000)
1999	Henderson State	2–9	2–7	9th	
2000	Henderson State	1–10	0–9	12th	
Henderson State:		3–19	2–16		
Total:		3–19			
