= Myles Brennan =

American football player (born 1999)

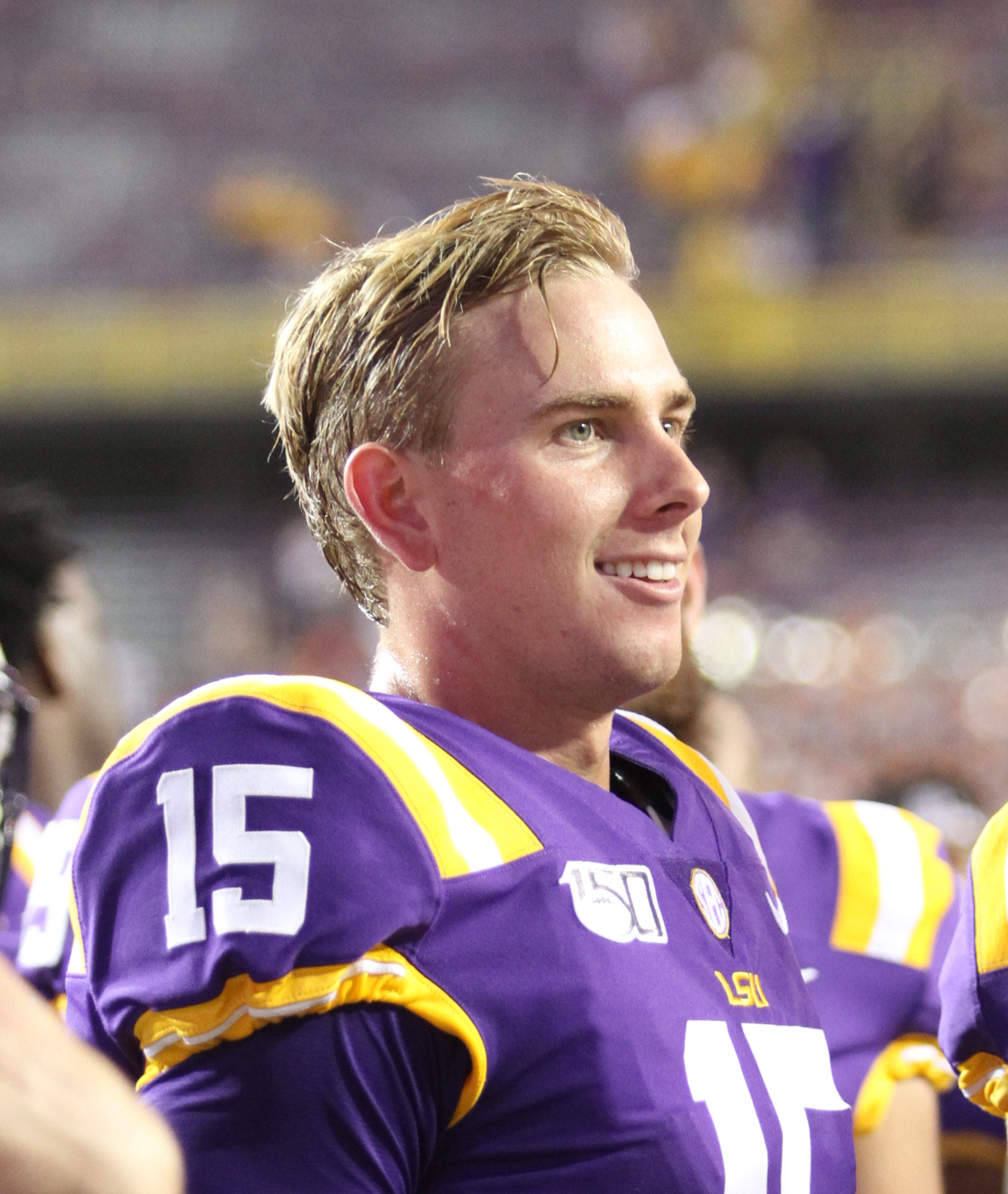
- Brennan in 2019

No. 15
- Position: Quarterback

Personal information
- Born: March 2, 1999 (age 27); Long Beach, Mississippi, U.S.
- Listed height: 6 ft 4 in (1.93 m)
- Listed weight: 207 lb (94 kg)

Career information
- High school: St. Stanislaus (Bay St. Louis, Mississippi)
- College: LSU (2017–2021)

Awards and highlights
- CFP national champion (2020)
- Stats at ESPN

Myles Brennan (born March 2, 1999) is an American former college football quarterback who played for the LSU Tigers for 4 years.

== Early life ==
Brennan attended Saint Stanislaus College in Bay St. Louis, Mississippi. During his career, he set Mississippi high school career records for total offense (16,168 yards), passing touchdowns (166) and passing yards (15,138). He took the Rock-A-Chaws to state title game appearances in 2014 and 2015, both losses to Noxubee County, where he faced future Tennessee Titans defensive end Jeffery Simmons. He was the Biloxi Sun Herald Player of the Year in 2014, 2015 and 2016. Brennan played in the 2017 Under Armour All-American Game, where he was named a team captain. He committed to Louisiana State University (LSU) to play college football.

== College career ==
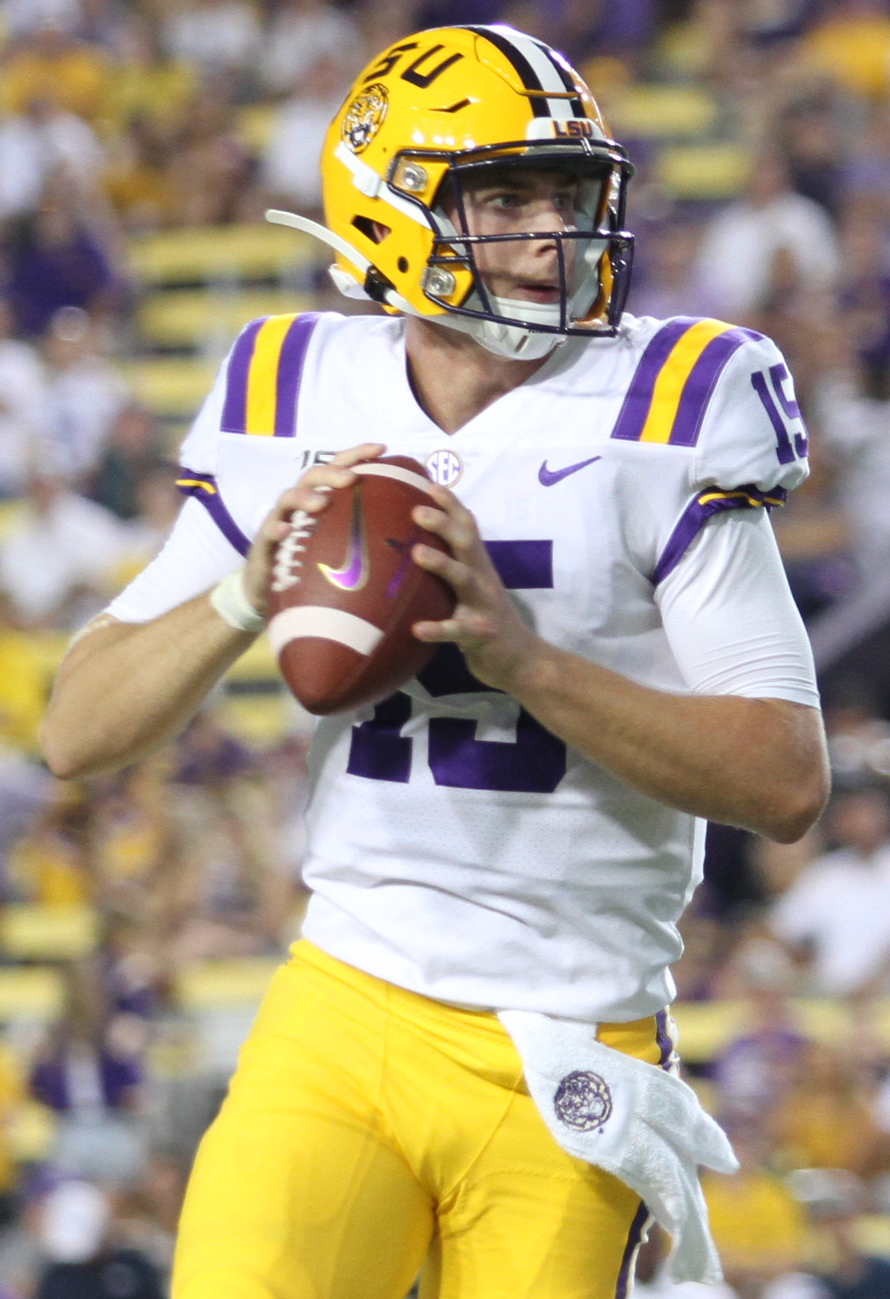
Brennan with LSU in 2019

In 2017, Brennan played in six games as a backup quarterback to Danny Etling his true freshman year. He completed 14 of 24 passes for 182 yards and a touchdown.

In 2018, as the backup to Joe Burrow, Brennan played in one game, completing four of six passes for 65 yards, and took a redshirt.

In 2019, Brennan played in 10 games and completed 24 of 40 passes for 353 yards with a touchdown, as the Tigers won the national championship. With Burrow graduating, Brennan was the favorite to take over as the starter for LSU in 2020.

Prior to the 2020 season, Brennan was announced to be the opening day starter against Mississippi State. LSU lost the game 44–34 as Brennan completed 27 for 46 for 345 yards and 3 touchdowns to 2 interceptions. Opposing MSU quarterback K. J. Costello threw for 623 yards, setting a new SEC single-game passing record. Brennan suffered an abdominal injury against Missouri in Week 3, sidelining him for the remainder of the season.

Following a season-ending injury suffered by Brennan during preseason training camp, Max Johnson was named LSU's starting quarterback.

On November 1, 2021, LSU head coach Ed Orgeron confirmed that Brennan would be entering the transfer portal to leave LSU. However, on December 16, 2021, Brennan announced he would opt to remain at LSU under new head coach Brian Kelly.

After opting to remain at LSU, Coach Brian Kelly announced on August 15, 2022, that Brennan has chosen to end his football career.

=== Statistics ===
| Season | Games | | | Passing | | | | | | |
| Season | GP | GS | Record | Comp | Att | Yards | Pct | TD | Int | Rtg |
|---|---|---|---|---|---|---|---|---|---|---|
| 2017 | 6 | 0 | 0–0 | 14 | 24 | 182 | 58.3 | 1 | 2 | 119.1 |
| 2018 | 1 | 0 | 0–0 | 4 | 6 | 65 | 66.7 | 0 | 0 | 157.7 |
| 2019 | 8 | 0 | 0–0 | 24 | 40 | 353 | 60.0 | 1 | 1 | 137.4 |
| 2020 | 3 | 3 | 1–2 | 79 | 131 | 1,112 | 60.3 | 11 | 3 | 154.7 |
| 2021 | Did not play due to injury. | | | | | | | | | |
| Career | 18 | 3 | 1–2 | 121 | 201 | 1,712 | 60.2 | 13 | 6 | 147.1 |

== Personal life ==
On December 17, 2021, Brennan proposed to his girlfriend, Erin Hebert, inside Tiger Stadium at LSU. Hebert is the niece of former New Orleans Saints quarterback, Bobby Hebert. The couple got married on April 15, 2023.
