= Attalla City Schools =

Attalla City Schools is a school district headquartered in Attalla, Alabama.

Its boundary is that of the City of Attala.

== History ==
In 1959 this district and the Etowah County School District came to an agreement, signed by the two parties, that the county district would keep operating what was then called Etowah County High School while the county would help build Alma Hinson Junior High School. The Attalla district controlled Hinson Junior High and Curtiston Elementary School. The Attalla district at the time did not operate any high schools. The two districts, under said agreement, sent students to each other's schools.

In April 1975, the city district sought to get control of the high school. In May the Attalla district filed a lawsuit to try to make the Etowah County district give up the high school. Attalla then changed its lawsuit so it would also take control of the Etowah Area Vocational School. By then, both schools were in the Attalla city limits.

Roy Mayhall, a circuit judge, said that the county district should continue to operate those two schools. The case was appealed to the Alabama Supreme Court. In June 1975, a member of the Alabama House of Representatives from the county, Kerry Rich, filed a bill proposing that if a county-based school district's vocational school located in the limits of that city has most of its students within the county-based school district, that city-based school district cannot take control of that county vocational school. This bill would have meant that the Attalla school district would be unable to take the vocational school from the county district. By June 1976 the two school districts were trying to find a settlement to the issue. That month, the board of trustees of the county school district voted to give the high school to the city district with conditions, with four board members voting in favor and two voting against. The city district took control of the high school in July 1976.

In 1990 and in 1991, two years in a row, Governor of Alabama H. Guy Hunt reduced the state's education budget. In response, the district, in October 1991, made plans to have the start of classes for the 1992-1993 school year delayed and to not give payments to teachers for the month of September 1992. That month, Paul Hubbert, who did lobbying work, stated that, in October 1991, it was not yet time to use legal remedies as there was still time for the funding issue to be resolved.

On June 1, 2018, Jeff Colegrove was scheduled to begin being the superintendent of the district.

== Programs ==
In 1985, the district had a special at risk education program. In 1988, the district had a summer school program aimed at reducing the dropout rate.

== Schools ==
The district includes the following schools:

- Attalla Elementary School (Grades Pk–5)
- Etowah Middle School (Grades 6–8)
- Etowah High School (Grades 9–12)

The system formerly had Alma Hinson Junior High School. In 1962, the editor of The Etowah News Journal described the school as having a "nothing short of excellent" curricula and "a bright exception" to problems in other schools in the system.

Previously there were two separate elementary schools: Curtiston Primary School and Stowers Hill Intermediate School, the former covering up to grade 2 and the latter covering grades 3-5. In 2010, they consolidated into a single Attalla Elementary School, located at the former primary school. Additional space was installed at the ex-Curtiston campus, designed by McKee and Associates and built by Boatner Construction Co.
