= Arik Gilbert =

American football player (born 2002)

No. 80
- Position: Tight end

Personal information
- Born: February 22, 2002 (age 24); Marietta, Georgia, U.S.
- Listed height: 6 ft 4 in (1.93 m)
- Listed weight: 250 lb (113 kg)

Career information
- High school: Marietta (GA)
- College: LSU (2020); Georgia (2021–2022); Nebraska (2023–2024); Savannah State (2025)

Awards and highlights
- 2× CFP national champion (2021, 2022); Gatorade Football Player of the Year (2019); USA Today High School All-American (2019)
- Stats at ESPN

Arik Dasan Gilbert (born February 22, 2002) is an American former college football tight end. He played for the LSU Tigers, Georgia Bulldogs, Nebraska Cornhuskers, and Savannah State.

== Early life ==
Gilbert attended Marietta High School in Marietta, Georgia. As a senior, he was the Gatorade Football Player of the Year after he caught 101 passes for 1,760 yards and 14 touchdowns. For his career he had 243 receptions for 3,540 yards and 35 touchdowns. A five-star recruit, Gilbert was ranked among the top players in his class and committed to Louisiana State University (LSU) to play college football.

== College career ==
=== LSU ===
As a freshman, Gilbert first played for LSU. Before the season, Gilbert was predicted to be on the Freshman All-SEC Team. Gilbert started all eight games he played in, catching 35 passes for 368 yards and two touchdowns. However, Gilbert opted out of the remainder of the 2020 LSU Tigers football season in December, citing bodily injury.

=== Georgia ===
Gilbert entered the transfer portal on January 2, 2021, and initially committed to the University of Florida on January 31. He re-entered the portal less than a month later on February 28, and would later transfer to the University of Georgia before the summer semester of 2021. However, Gilbert would not play during the entire 2021 season for personal reasons. Gilbert's only catches as a Georgia Bulldog came against Vanderbilt in the 2022 season, where he had two catches for sixteen yards and a touchdown.

=== Nebraska ===
Gilbert elected to transfer again following the conclusion of the 2022 Georgia Bulldogs football season, this time to the University of Nebraska–Lincoln for the 2023 Nebraska Cornhuskers football team. On December 10, 2024, Gilbert announced that he would enter the transfer portal for the third time.

=== Savannah State ===
On April 29, 2025, Gilbert announced that he was transferring for the fourth time in his college career, this time to Savannah State University.

== Legal issues ==
On August 29, 2023, while awaiting eligibility to play at Nebraska, Gilbert was arrested for burglary of a liquor and vape store in Lincoln. He was arrested a second time for a smash-and-grab burglary of 150 vapes in Lumpkin County, Georgia on September 16, 2023. On January 30, 2024, he pleaded no contest to the charges and was fined $400, along with being ordered to pay $450 in restitution to the store. On October 23, 2025, he was arrested on obstruction and shoplifting charges. His bail was set at $3,500.
