= Bo Nix =

American football player (born 2000)

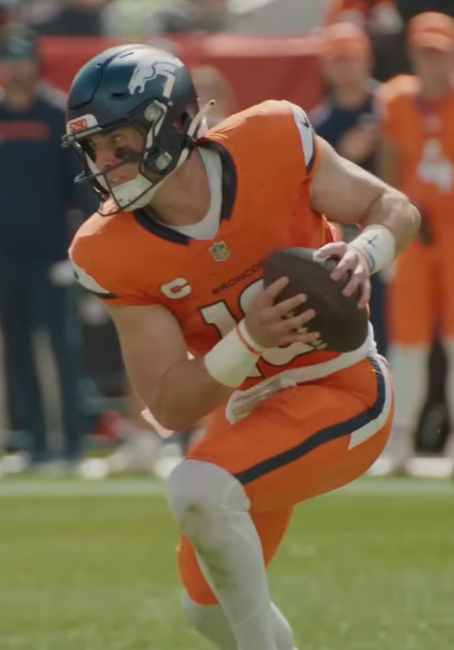
- Nix with the Denver Broncos in 2025

No. 10 – Denver Broncos
- Position: Quarterback
- Roster status: Active

Personal information
- Born: February 25, 2000 (age 26); Arkadelphia, Arkansas, U.S.
- Listed height: 6 ft 2 in (1.88 m)
- Listed weight: 217 lb (98 kg)

Career information
- High school: Pinson Valley (Pinson, Alabama)
- College: Auburn (2019–2021); Oregon (2022–2023)
- NFL draft: 2024: 1st round, 12th overall pick

Career history
- Denver Broncos (2024–present)

Awards and highlights
- William V. Campbell Trophy (2023); NCAA completion percentage leader (2023); NCAA passing touchdowns leader (2023); Pac-12 Offensive Player of the Year (2023); First-team All-Pac-12 (2023); SEC Freshman of the Year (2019); FBS records: Completion percentage in a season: 77.45% (2023)

Career NFL statistics as of Week 9, 2026
- Passing attempts: 1,466
- Passing completions: 938
- Completion percentage: 64.0%
- TD–INT: 65–27
- Passing yards: 9,436
- Passer rating: 89.3
- Rushing yards: 902
- Rushing touchdowns: 11
- Stats at Pro Football Reference

Bo Chapman Nix (born February 25, 2000) is an American professional football quarterback for the Denver Broncos of the National Football League (NFL). He played his first three seasons of college football for the Auburn Tigers, winning SEC Freshman of the Year in 2019. During his last two seasons, Nix was a member of the Oregon Ducks and won Pac-12 Offensive Player of the Year in 2023 after leading the FBS in passing touchdowns and completion percentage.

Nix was selected by Denver in the first round of the 2024 NFL draft and was named the starter as a rookie. He led the Broncos to the playoffs in his first season and to a division title, playoff win, and the 2025 AFC Championship Game game in his second, all of which were the first for the franchise since 2015.

Nix is known for his clutch factor and for his ability to consistently perform late in games, setting multiple league records for comeback wins, consecutive one-score wins, and game-winning drives.

== Early life ==
Nix was born on February 25, 2000, in Arkadelphia, Arkansas. He played under his father Patrick at Pinson Valley High School in Pinson, Alabama, where he accumulated over 12,000 total offensive yards and 161 touchdowns. Previously, Nix played at Scottsboro High School in Scottsboro, Alabama, where he passed for 3,463 yards and threw 40 touchdown passes. Nix won Alabama's Mr. Football Award as a senior in 2018. He was rated the top dual-threat quarterback of his class and committed to play college football at Auburn University.

College recruiting
Name	Hometown	School	Height	Weight	40^{‡}	Commit date
Bo Nix; QB	Pinson, Alabama	Pinson Valley High School	6 ft 2 in (1.88 m)	219 lb (99 kg)	4.57	Jan 10, 2018
Bo Nix; QB	Recruit ratings: Scout: Rivals: 247Sports: (86)					
Overall recruit ranking: Rivals: 29 (overall), 1 (DUAL), 3 (AL) 247Sports: 33 (overall), 1 (DUAL), 3 (AL) ESPN: 76 (DT) 148 (Region)
Note: In many cases, Scout, Rivals, 247Sports, On3, and ESPN may conflict in their listings of height and weight.; In these cases, the average was taken. ESPN grades are on a 100-point scale.; Sources: "Auburn Football Commitment List". Rivals.; "2019 Auburn Football Commits". Scout.; "Auburn 2019 Football Commits". ESPN.; "Scout.com Team Recruiting Rankings". Scout.; "2019 Team Ranking". Rivals.com.

== College career ==
=== Auburn ===
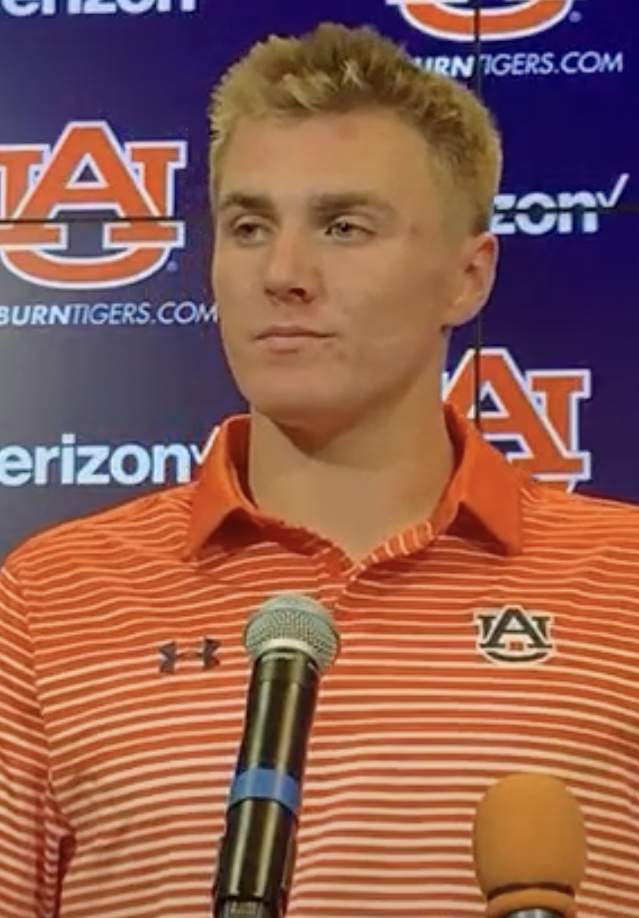
Nix in 2019

As a true freshman at Auburn, Nix was named the starting quarterback for the 2019 season. He led Auburn to a 27–21 come-back win against the Oregon Ducks at AT&T Stadium in Arlington, Texas, on August 31, 2019. Nix led Auburn to a 9–4 record in his freshman season, winning the Iron Bowl, 48–45 over Alabama. He was voted the SEC's 2019 Freshman of the Year, finishing the campaign with 16 touchdowns and six interceptions.

Nix threw for 12 touchdowns and seven interceptions as a sophomore in 11 games in the pandemic-shortened season in 2020.

The year 2021 brought an up-and-down season for Nix, with highlights being leading Auburn to their first win at LSU since 1999 and a win over #10 Ole Miss, while also struggling in certain games and being benched for T. J. Finley in the fourth quarter of a game against Georgia State. Nix suffered a season-ending injury against Mississippi State. He threw for 11 touchdowns and three interceptions in 2021. On December 12, 2021, Nix announced he was entering the transfer portal, describing himself as "miserable" while playing under Auburn head coach Bryan Harsin, who had been hired in 2021.

=== Oregon ===
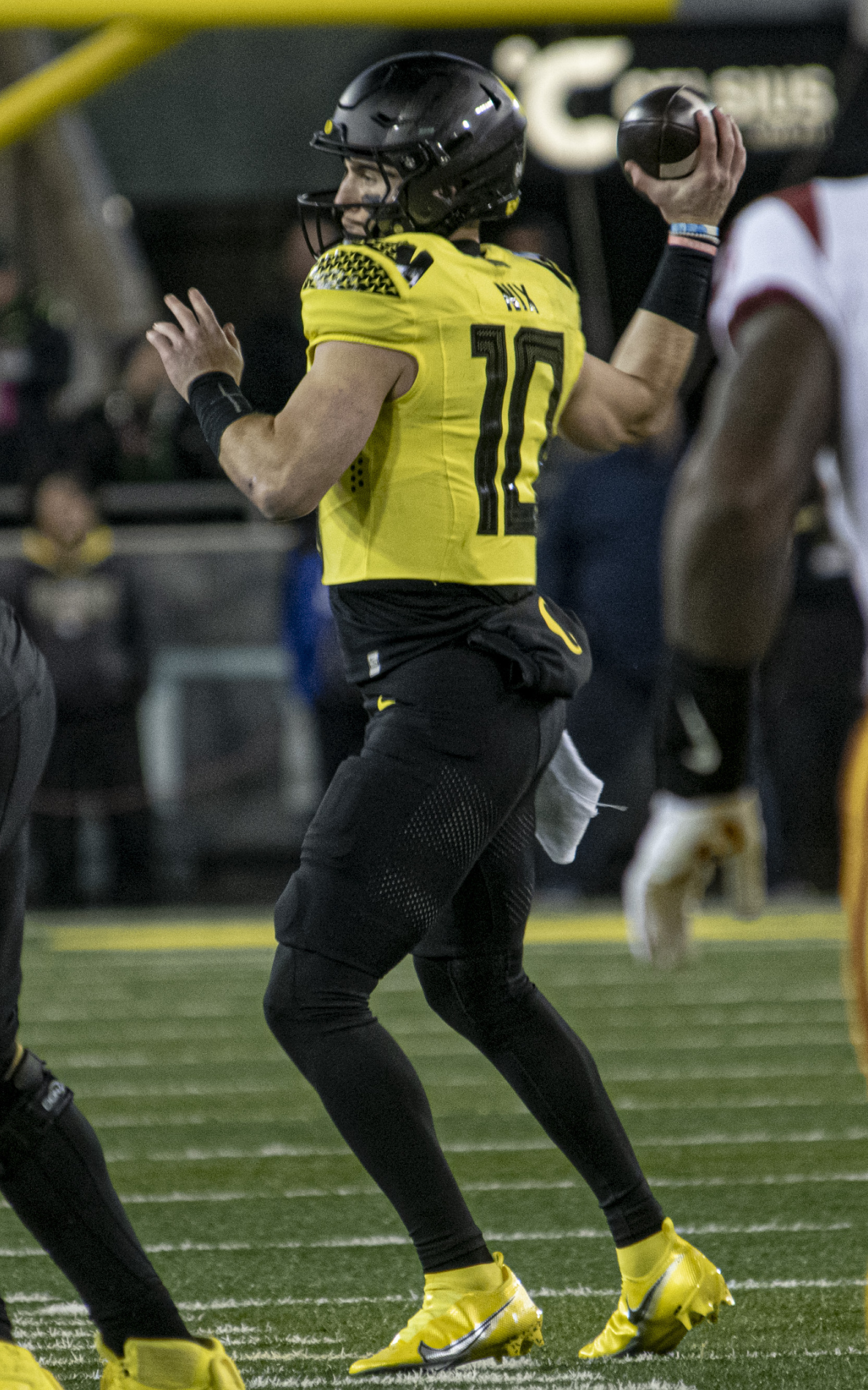
Nix with the Oregon Ducks in 2023

In 2022, Nix transferred to the University of Oregon with two seasons of eligibility remaining based on the NCAA's COVID-19 eligibility waiver for the 2020 season. Nix led Oregon to a 10–3 record in the 2022 season. The season saw ranked victories over BYU, UCLA, and Utah before culminating in a narrow 28–27 victory over North Carolina in the Holiday Bowl. Nix finished the season with 3,593 passing yards, 29 touchdowns, and seven interceptions to go along with 89 carries for 510 yards and 14 touchdowns. He also had a receiving touchdown on the season.

In the 2023 season, Nix led Oregon to a successful season, while primarily being in contention for the College Football Playoff. He helped lead the team to a 5–0 start before their first setback against #7 Washington. The team reeled off six consecutive wins to set up a rematch with #3 Washington in the Pac-12 Championship Game. The Ducks fell to the Huskies once again to fall out of contention for the College Football Playoff. Nix passed for 4,508 yards, 45 touchdowns, and three interceptions to go with six rushing touchdowns on the year. Nix finished third place in the Heisman Trophy vote behind Jayden Daniels and Michael Penix Jr. Following his final collegiate game in the Fiesta Bowl against Liberty, Nix broke Mac Jones's previous record for the highest single season completion percentage at 77.45%. Nix led the NCAA in pass completions, completion percentage, and passing touchdowns in 2023. He started 61 games between Auburn and Oregon, the most in NCAA history for a quarterback.

== Professional career ==
Pre-draft measurables
Height	Weight	Arm length	Hand span	Wingspan
6 ft 2 1/8 in (1.88 m)	214 lb (97 kg)	31 7/8 in (0.81 m)	10 1/8 in (0.26 m)	6 ft 2 1/4 in (1.89 m)
All values from NFL Combine

=== 2024 season ===
Nix was selected by the Denver Broncos in the first round (12th overall) of the 2024 NFL draft. He initially drew the interest of head coach Sean Payton due to his high completion rate and low negative play differential in college, in addition to an impressive performance in private workouts. Nix was the last of six quarterbacks taken in the first round, tied with the 1983 draft for the most in NFL history. On May 11, 2024, he signed his four-year rookie contract, worth $18.6 million fully guaranteed.

On August 22, Nix was named the Broncos' starting quarterback for the season opener against the Seattle Seahawks, becoming the first Broncos rookie to start since John Elway in 1983. In his NFL debut against Seattle, Nix completed 26 of 42 passes for 138 yards, two interceptions, and a rushing touchdown during a 26–20 loss. His 138 passing yards set an NFL record for the fewest by a quarterback with 25 or more completions in a game. Nix earned his first win in week 3 against the Tampa Bay Buccaneers, throwing for 216 yards, a rushing touchdown, and no interceptions in a 26–7 victory. In week 4, he recorded his first career passing touchdown and led the Broncos to a 10–9 upset victory over the New York Jets despite ending the first half with negative passing yards and finishing the game with only 60 total passing yards. Additionally, Nix did not allow a turnover or sack for the second consecutive game.

Nix had a standout October, beginning with a three-touchdown performance in a week 5 victory against the Las Vegas Raiders, followed by 216 passing yards and two touchdowns in week 6 against the Los Angeles Chargers. In week 7, he led the Broncos to a dominant 33–10 win over the New Orleans Saints, tying the franchise record for rookie quarterback wins. He capped the month with 284 passing yards, four total touchdowns, and a 75.7% completion rate in week 8 against the Carolina Panthers, setting a new franchise record with five wins as a rookie. His performances throughout October earned him NFL Offensive Rookie of the Month honors.

In Week 9 against the Baltimore Ravens, Nix caught his first career receiving touchdown on a trick play from receiver Courtland Sutton. Nix was named NFL Rookie of the Week in week 10 after throwing for 215 yards, two touchdowns, and orchestrating a late drive that ended with a potential game-winning field goal being blocked in a 16–14 loss to the two-time defending Super Bowl champion Kansas City Chiefs. The following week against the Atlanta Falcons, Nix went 28-of-33 for a career-high 307 yards and four touchdowns as the Broncos won 38–6. He became the first rookie quarterback in NFL history to complete over 80% of his passes while throwing for at least four touchdowns and 300 yards. Following the game, he was named AFC Offensive Player of the Week and Rookie of the Week. Nix led the Broncos to victories in their next three games to reach 9–5, but losses to the Los Angeles Chargers and Cincinnati Bengals put their playoff hopes in jeopardy. Needing a win in the final game of the regular season, Nix went 26-of-29 with a then career high 321 yards and four touchdowns in a 38–0 victory over the Chiefs to clinch the Broncos' first playoff berth since 2015. Nix finished the regular season with 29 total passing touchdowns, the second-most ever by a rookie quarterback.

In the Wild Card round, Nix was held in check, finishing 13-for-22 with 144 yards passing and one touchdown with 43 rushing yards as the Broncos fell 31–7 to the Buffalo Bills. Nix's sole touchdown, a 43-yard pass to Troy Franklin, was the first rookie-to-rookie touchdown pass in NFL playoff history. Following the Broncos' elimination, Nix revealed that he had played with transverse process fractures in his back since Week 12.

Nix was originally the fourth alternate AFC quarterback in the Pro Bowl, but was invited to play due to opt-outs. However, due to a previously scheduled minor postseason cleanup procedure, he also had to decline.

Nix was a finalist for NFL Offensive Rookie of the Year, placing third behind Jayden Daniels and Brock Bowers. He was voted the 64th-best player in the league in the Top 100 Players of 2025 by his NFL peers following his successful rookie campaign.

=== 2025 season ===
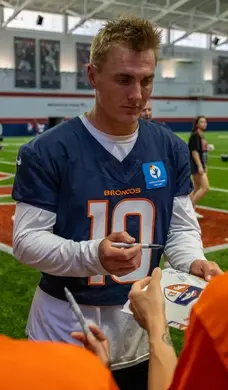
Nix in 2025

On July 23, 2025, Broncos head coach Sean Payton revealed that Nix spent a portion of the offseason working with former Saints quarterback Drew Brees and throwing mechanics specialist Tom House.

During Week 7 against the New York Giants, Nix became the first player in NFL history to have at least two passing and two rushing touchdowns in a single quarter in a comeback victory after being down 19–0 to begin the fourth quarter. The Broncos scored a total of 33 points to win 33–32, the most in a game by any team held scoreless through three quarters in league history and the second most points scored in the fourth quarter in NFL history.

Nix had a career game in Week 15, going 23 of 34 for 302 yards and four touchdowns and a passer rating of 134.7 in a playoff-clinching 34–26 victory against the Green Bay Packers. For his performance, Nix was named a FedEx Air & Ground Player of the Week.

In Week 18, the Broncos defeated the Los Angeles Chargers 19–3, securing them the top seed in the AFC. Despite a relatively pedestrian stat line of 14 for 23 and 141 yards, Nix set the record for the most wins ever in a single regular season by a Broncos quarterback with 14 while simultaneously tying Russell Wilson for the NFL record of the most regular season wins by a quarterback through two seasons with 24.

After the first round bye, Nix and the Broncos were set to play the Buffalo Bills in the Divisional Round in a playoff rematch from last year. Nix completed 26 of 46 attempts for 279 yards, and threw for three touchdowns with one interception as the Broncos won in overtime 33–30, marking their first playoff win since Super Bowl 50 at the end of the 2015 season. With this win, Nix holds the record for the most game winning drives in a season by a quarterback age 25 or younger (8). However, during the third-to-last play of the game, Nix suffered a broken ankle, ending his season. He was officially placed on injured reserve on January 24, 2026. The following week, the Broncos fell short in the AFC Championship game against the New England Patriots, with backup quarterback Jarrett Stidham starting the game in absence of the injured Nix.

Nix was ranked as the 59th-best player in the NFL on the Top 100 Players of 2026.

=== 2026 season ===
See also: 2026 Denver Broncos season

Following an ankle injury that ended Nix's previous season during a 33–30 overtime victory over the Buffalo Bills in the Divisional Round of the NFL playoffs, Nix made his return to action seven months later against the Kansas City Chiefs on Monday Night Football. He completed 17 of 28 passes for 131 yards, one touchdown, and one interception in a 31–10 loss.

Nix's performances during the first six games of the season were below expectations, as he recorded 1,049 passing yards, six passing touchdowns, and three interceptions. His passing yardage and interception totals were career lows through the first six games of a season. However, Nix showed signs of improvement between Weeks 7 and 10. Notably, during the Week 8 rematch against Kansas City, where Denver faced a nine-point fourth quarter deficit, Nix completed 20 of 32 passes for 222 yards and two touchdowns as the Broncos overcame the deficit, winning 28–24. In total, he averaged 227.0 passing yards and 1.67 passing touchdowns per game over a three-game span.

== Career statistics ==
Legend
	Led the league
**Bold**	Career high

=== NFL ===
==== Regular season ====
Year	Team	Games			Passing									Rushing					Sacks		Fumbles	
Year	Team	GP	GS	Record	Cmp	Att	Pct	Yds	Y/A	Lng	TD	Int	Rtg	Att	Yds	Avg	Lng	TD	Sck	SckY	Fum	Lost
2024	DEN	17	17	10−7	376	567	**66.3**	3,775	**6.7**	**93**	**29**	**12**	**93.3**	**92**	**430**	**4.7**	32	4	**24**	**198**	3	0
2025	DEN	17	17	**14–3** (Note: Tied with the New England Patriots and Seattle Seahawks.)	**388**	**612**	63.4	**3,931**	6.4	52	25	11	87.8	83	356	4.3	25	**5**	22	119	4	1
2026	DEN	9	9	7−2	174	287	60.6	1,730	6.0	52	11	4	84.7	37	116	3.1	**62**	2	11	57	**8**	**2**
Career		43	43	31–12	938	1,466	64.0	9,436	6.4	93	65	27	89.3	212	902	4.3	63	11	57	374	15	3

==== Postseason ====
Year	Team	Games			Passing									Rushing					Sacks		Fumbles	
Year	Team	GP	GS	Record	Cmp	Att	Pct	Yds	Y/A	Lng	TD	Int	Rtg	Att	Yds	Avg	Lng	TD	Sck	SckY	Fum	Lost
2024	DEN	1	1	0−1	13	22	**59.1**	144	**6.5**	**43**	1	0	**93.7**	4	**43**	**10.8**	**18**	0	**2**	**14**	0	0
2025	DEN	1	1	**1−0**	**26**	**46**	56.5	**279**	6.1	29	**3**	**1**	87.1	**12**	29	2.4	11	0	0	0	**1**	0
Career		2	2	1−1	39	68	57.4	423	6.2	43	4	1	89.3	16	72	4.5	18	0	2	14	1	0

=== College ===
Legend
FBS record
Led NCAA Division I FBS

Season	Team	Games			Passing								Rushing			
Season	Team	GP	GS	Record	Comp	Att	Pct	Yds	Avg	TD	Int	Rate	Att	Yds	Avg	TD
2019	Auburn	13	13	9−4	217	377	57.6	2,542	6.7	16	6	125.0	97	313	3.1	7
2020	Auburn	11	11	6−5	214	357	59.9	2,415	6.8	12	7	123.9	**108**	388	3.6	7
2021	Auburn	10	10	6−4	197	323	61.0	2,293	7.1	11	**3**	130.0	57	168	2.9	4
2022	Oregon	13	13	10−3	294	409	71.9	3,593	8.8	29	7	165.7	91	**546**	**6.0**	**15**
2023	Oregon	14	14	**12–2**	**364**	**470**	**77.4**	**4,508**	**9.6**	**45**	**3**	**188.3**	54	234	4.3	6
Career		61	61	43−18	1,286	1,936	66.4	15,351	7.9	113	26	149.6	407	1,649	4.1	39

== Career highlights ==
=== Awards and honors ===
NFL

- Ranked No. 64 in the Top 100 Players of 2025
- Ranked No. 59 in the Top 100 Players of 2026

College

- William V. Campbell Trophy (2023)
- NCAA completion percentage leader (2023)
- NCAA passing touchdowns leader (2023)
- Pac-12 Offensive Player of the Year (2023)
- First-team All-Pac-12 (2023)
- SEC Freshman of the Year (2019)

=== Records ===
==== NFL records ====
- First QB to record 20 or more wins, 7,500 or more passing yards and 50 or more passing touchdowns in their first two seasons
- Most wins by a QB in their first two seasons: 24 (tied with Russell Wilson)
- Most game-winning drives by a QB in their first two seasons: 10 (tied with Andrew Luck)
- Most game-winning drives by a QB in their first three seasons: 16
- Most consecutive one-score wins in NFL history as a starting QB: 17 (includes the postseason)
- Most comeback wins in a season by a QB: 12 (2025)
- Most comeback wins by a QB in their first three seasons: 24
- First player in NFL history to have at least two passing and two rushing touchdowns in a single quarter (Week 7 2025 vs New York Giants)
- Highest single-game completion percentage by a rookie quarterback (minimum 25 attempts) : 89.7% (Week 18 2024 vs Kansas City Chiefs)

==== Broncos franchise records ====
- Most passing yards (3,775) , passing touchdowns (29), completions (376) in a season for a rookie QB
- Most total offensive TDs in a season by a rookie QB: 34
- Most wins in a season by a rookie QB: 10
- Most wins in a season by a QB: 14
- Longest rushing TD by a QB: 62 yards (Week 7 2026 vs Arizona Cardinals)

== Personal life ==
Nix is the son of football coach and former Auburn quarterback Patrick Nix. He is also the grandson of longtime high school football coach Conrad Nix. Nix's younger brother Caleb plays safety for the Jacksonville State Gamecocks and his adopted brother Tez Johnson plays wide receiver for the Tampa Bay Buccaneers.

Nix is a Christian. He is married to Izzy Smoke, a former Auburn cheerleader. On October 10, 2025, they announced they were expecting their first child. On February 25, 2026, their first daughter Riley was born. The family resides near Castle Rock, Colorado in a home purchased from former NFL running back Shane Vereen.
