= Etowah High School (Alabama) =

Public high school in Attalla, Alabama, United States

Location
- 201 Case Avenue; Attalla, Alabama, Alabama 35954; United States; 33°59′44″N 86°06′37″W

Information
- Other name: EHS
- Type: Public high school
- Motto: Character, Commitment, Community
- School district: Attalla City Schools (since July 1976); Etowah County Schools (prior to July 1976)
- NCES School ID: 010018000033
- Principal: Stephen Hall
- Teaching staff: 30.30 (on an FTE basis)
- Grades: 9–12
- Enrollment: 468 (2023-2024)
- Student to teacher ratio: 15.45
- Campus type: Suburban
- Colors: Royal Blue and White
- Mascot: Blue Devil
- Nickname: Blue Devils
- Website: ehs.attalla.k12.al.us

Etowah High School (EHS), formerly Etowah County High School, is a public high school in Attalla, Alabama, United States. It is part of the Attalla City Schools district.

== History ==
The Etowah County School District board of trustees selected the location of the school, the City of Attalla, in April 1908, and in July of that year, an announcement was made that construction was to begin soon. This was prompted by a law established in 1907 stating that counties may have high schools if they did not already have agricultural schools. Etowah County High began operations on September 21, 1908. The first principal was W.F. Turnipseed, who held the position until 1910. Construction finished on its second building in February 1910.

In 1959 the school had 43 teachers for 1,266 students, a situation Mrs. Clark Mynatt of the Etowah News-Journal described as a "bad situation of overcrowding".

In the 1970s it was already in the city limits, but it was still operated by the Etowah County Board of Education. In April 1975 the city district sought to get control of the high school. In May, the Attalla district filed a lawsuit to try to make the Etowah County district give up the high school.

Roy Mayhall, a circuit judge, said that the county district should continue to operate the high school. The case was appealed to the Alabama Supreme Court. By June 1976 the two school districts were trying to find a settlement to the issue. That month, the board of trustees of the county school district voted to give the high school to the city district with conditions, with four board members voting in favor and two voting against. That month, the city district took over the school.

== Curriculum ==
In 2019 drama was added to the fine arts subjects while computer science and robotics were added to the STEM subjects.

== Notable alumni ==
- Letha Hughes Etzkorn, Ph.D., P.E., Professor and Chair, Computer Science Department, University of Alabama in Huntsville—prolific publisher of refereed journal articles in computer science field and text book author on computer science
- Freddie Kitchens, football coach
- Roy Moore, politician and jurist
- Derrick Nix, football coach
- Patrick Nix, football coach
- Tyrone Nix, football coach
- Cadillac Williams, football player
