= 1945 in the United States =

- Decades: 1920s; 1930s; 1940s; 1950s; 1960s
- See also: History of the United States (1945–1964); Timeline of United States history (1930–1949); List of years in the United States

Events from the year 1945 in the United States. World War II ended during this year following the surrender of Germany in May and that of Japan in September.

== Incumbents ==
=== Federal government ===
- President:

Franklin D. Roosevelt (D-New York) (until April 12)
Harry S. Truman (D-Missouri) (starting April 12)

- Vice President:

Henry A. Wallace (D-Iowa) (until January 20)
Harry S. Truman (D-Missouri) (January 20 – April 12)
vacant (starting April 12)

- Chief Justice: Harlan F. Stone (New York)
- Speaker of the House of Representatives: Sam Rayburn (D-Texas)
- Senate Majority Leader: Alben W. Barkley (D-Kentucky)
- Congress: 78th (until January 3), 79th (starting January 3)

==== State governments ====
Governors and lieutenant governors

=== Governors ===
- Governor of Alabama: Chauncey Sparks (Democratic)
- Governor of Arizona: Sidney Preston Osborn (Democratic)
- Governor of Arkansas: Homer Martin Adkins (Democratic) (until January 9), Benjamin Travis Laney (Democratic) (starting January 9)
- Governor of California: Earl Warren (Republican)
- Governor of Colorado: John Charles Vivian (Republican)
- Governor of Connecticut: Raymond E. Baldwin (Republican)
- Governor of Delaware: Walter W. Bacon (Republican)
- Governor of Florida: Spessard Holland (Democratic) (until January 2), Millard F. Caldwell (Democratic) (starting January 2)
- Governor of Georgia: Ellis Arnall (Democratic)
- Governor of Idaho:
  - until January 1: C. A. Bottolfsen (Republican)
  - January 1-November 17: Charles C. Gossett (Democratic)
  - starting November 17: Arnold Williams (Democratic)
- Governor of Illinois: Dwight H. Green (Republican)
- Governor of Indiana: Henry F. Schricker (Democratic) (until January 8), Ralph F. Gates (Republican) (starting January 8)
- Governor of Iowa: Bourke B. Hickenlooper (Republican) (until January 11), Robert D. Blue (Republican) (starting January 11)
- Governor of Kansas: Andrew F. Schoeppel (Republican)
- Governor of Kentucky: Simeon S. Willis (Republican)
- Governor of Louisiana: Jimmie H. Davis (Democratic)
- Governor of Maine: Sumner Sewall (Republican) (until January 3), Horace A. Hildreth (Republican) (starting January 3)
- Governor of Maryland: Herbert R. O'Conor (Democratic)
- Governor of Massachusetts: Leverett Saltonstall (Republican) (until January 3), Maurice J. Tobin (Democratic) (starting January 3)
- Governor of Michigan: Harry Kelly (Republican)
- Governor of Minnesota: Edward John Thye (Republican)
- Governor of Mississippi: Thomas L. Bailey (Democratic)
- Governor of Missouri: Forrest C. Donnell (Republican) (until January 8), Phil M. Donnelly (Democratic) (starting January 8)
- Governor of Montana: Sam C. Ford (Republican)
- Governor of Nebraska: Dwight Griswold (Republican)
- Governor of Nevada: Edward P. Carville (Democratic) (until July 24), Vail M. Pittman (Democratic) (starting July 24)
- Governor of New Hampshire: Robert O. Blood (Republican) (until January 4), Charles M. Dale (Republican) (starting January 4)
- Governor of New Jersey: Walter Evans Edge (Republican)
- Governor of New Mexico: John J. Dempsey (Democratic)
- Governor of New York: Thomas Dewey (Republican)
- Governor of North Carolina: J. Melville Broughton (Democratic) (until January 4), R. Gregg Cherry (Democratic) (until January 4)
- Governor of North Dakota: John Moses (Democratic) (until January 4), Fred G. Aandahl (Republican) (starting January 4)
- Governor of Ohio: John W. Bricker (Republican) (until January 8), Frank J. Lausche (Democratic) (starting January 8)
- Governor of Oklahoma: Robert S. Kerr (Democratic)
- Governor of Oregon: Earl Snell (Republican)
- Governor of Pennsylvania: Edward Martin (Republican)
- Governor of Rhode Island: J. Howard McGrath (Democratic) (until October 6), John Orlando Pastore (Democratic) (starting October 6)
- Governor of South Carolina: Olin D. Johnston (Democratic) (until January 2), Ransome Judson Williams (Democratic) (starting January 2)
- Governor of South Dakota: Merrill Q. Sharpe (Republican)
- Governor of Tennessee: Prentice Cooper (Democratic) (until January 16), Jim Nance McCord (Democratic) (starting January 16)
- Governor of Texas: Coke R. Stevenson (Democratic)
- Governor of Utah: Herbert B. Maw (Democratic)
- Governor of Vermont: William H. Wills (Republican) (until January 4), Mortimer R. Proctor (Republican) (starting January 4)
- Governor of Virginia: Colgate Darden (Democratic)
- Governor of Washington: Arthur B. Langlie (Republican) (until January 10), Monrad C. Wallgren (Democratic) (starting January 10)
- Governor of West Virginia: Matthew M. Neely (Democratic) (until January 15), Clarence W. Meadows (Democratic) (starting January 15)
- Governor of Wisconsin: Walter S. Goodland (Republican)
- Governor of Wyoming: Lester C. Hunt (Democratic)

=== Lieutenant governors ===
- Lieutenant Governor of Alabama: Leven H. Ellis (Democratic)
- Lieutenant Governor of Arkansas: James Lavesque Shaver (Democratic)
- Lieutenant Governor of California: Frederick F. Houser (Republican)
- Lieutenant Governor of Colorado: William Eugene Higby (Republican)
- Lieutenant Governor of Connecticut: William L. Hadden (Republican) (until month and day unknown), Charles Wilbert Snow (Democratic) (starting month and day unknown)
- Lieutenant Governor of Delaware: Isaac J. MacCollum (Democratic) (until January 16), Elbert N. Carvel (Democratic) (starting January 16)
- Lieutenant Governor of Idaho:
  - until January 1: Edwin Nelson (Republican)
  - January 1-November 17: Arnold Williams (Democratic)
  - starting November 17: vacant
- Lieutenant Governor of Illinois: Hugh W. Cross (Republican)
- Lieutenant Governor of Indiana: Charles M. Dawson (Democratic) (until January 8), Richard T. James (Republican) (starting January 8)
- Lieutenant Governor of Iowa: Robert D. Blue (Republican) (until January 11), Kenneth A. Evans (Republican) (starting January 11)
- Lieutenant Governor of Kansas: Jess C. Denious (Republican)
- Lieutenant Governor of Kentucky: Kenneth H. Tuggle (Republican)
- Lieutenant Governor of Louisiana: J. Emile Verret (Democratic)
- Lieutenant Governor of Massachusetts: Horace T. Cahill (Republican) (until January 3), vacant (starting January 3)
- Lieutenant Governor of Michigan: Eugene C. Keyes (Republican) (until month and day unknown), Vernon J. Brown (Republican) (starting month and day unknown)
- Lieutenant Governor of Minnesota: Archie H. Miller (Republican) (until January 2), C. Elmer Anderson (Republican) (starting January 2)
- Lieutenant Governor of Mississippi: Fielding L. Wright (Republican)
- Lieutenant Governor of Missouri: vacant (until January 8), Walter Naylor Davis (Democratic) (starting January 8)
- Lieutenant Governor of Montana: Ernest T. Eaton (Republican)
- Lieutenant Governor of Nebraska: Roy W. Johnson (Republican)
- Lieutenant Governor of Nevada: Vail M. Pittman (Democratic) (until July 24), vacant (starting July 24)
- Lieutenant Governor of New Mexico: James B. Jones (Democratic)
- Lieutenant Governor of New York: Joseph R. Hanley (Republican)
- Lieutenant Governor of North Carolina: Reginald L. Harris (Democratic) (until January 4), Lynton Y. Ballentine (Democratic) (starting January 4)
- Lieutenant Governor of North Dakota: vacant (until January 4), Clarence P. Dahl (Republican) (starting January 4)
- Lieutenant Governor of Ohio: Paul M. Herbert (Republican) (until January 8), George D. Nye (Democratic) (starting January 8)
- Lieutenant Governor of Oklahoma: James E. Berry (Democratic)
- Lieutenant Governor of Pennsylvania: John C. Bell, Jr. (Republican)
- Lieutenant Governor of Rhode Island:
  - until month and day unknown: vacant
  - month and day unknown: John O. Pastore (Democratic)
  - starting month and day unknown: vacant
- Lieutenant Governor of South Carolina: Ransome Judson Williams (Democratic) (until January 2), vacant (starting January 2)
- Lieutenant Governor of South Dakota: A. C. Miller (Republican) (until month and day unknown), Sioux K. Grigsby (Republican) (starting month and day unknown)
- Lieutenant Governor of Tennessee: Joseph H. Ballew (Democratic) (until month and day unknown), Larry Morgan (Democratic) (starting month and day unknown)
- Lieutenant Governor of Texas: John Lee Smith (Democratic)
- Lieutenant Governor of Vermont: Mortimer R. Proctor (Republican) (until January 4), Lee E. Emerson (Republican) (starting January 4)
- Lieutenant Governor of Virginia: William M. Tuck (Democratic)
- Lieutenant Governor of Washington: Victor A. Meyers (Democratic)
- Lieutenant Governor of Wisconsin: Oscar Rennebohm (Republican)

== Events ==
=== January ===
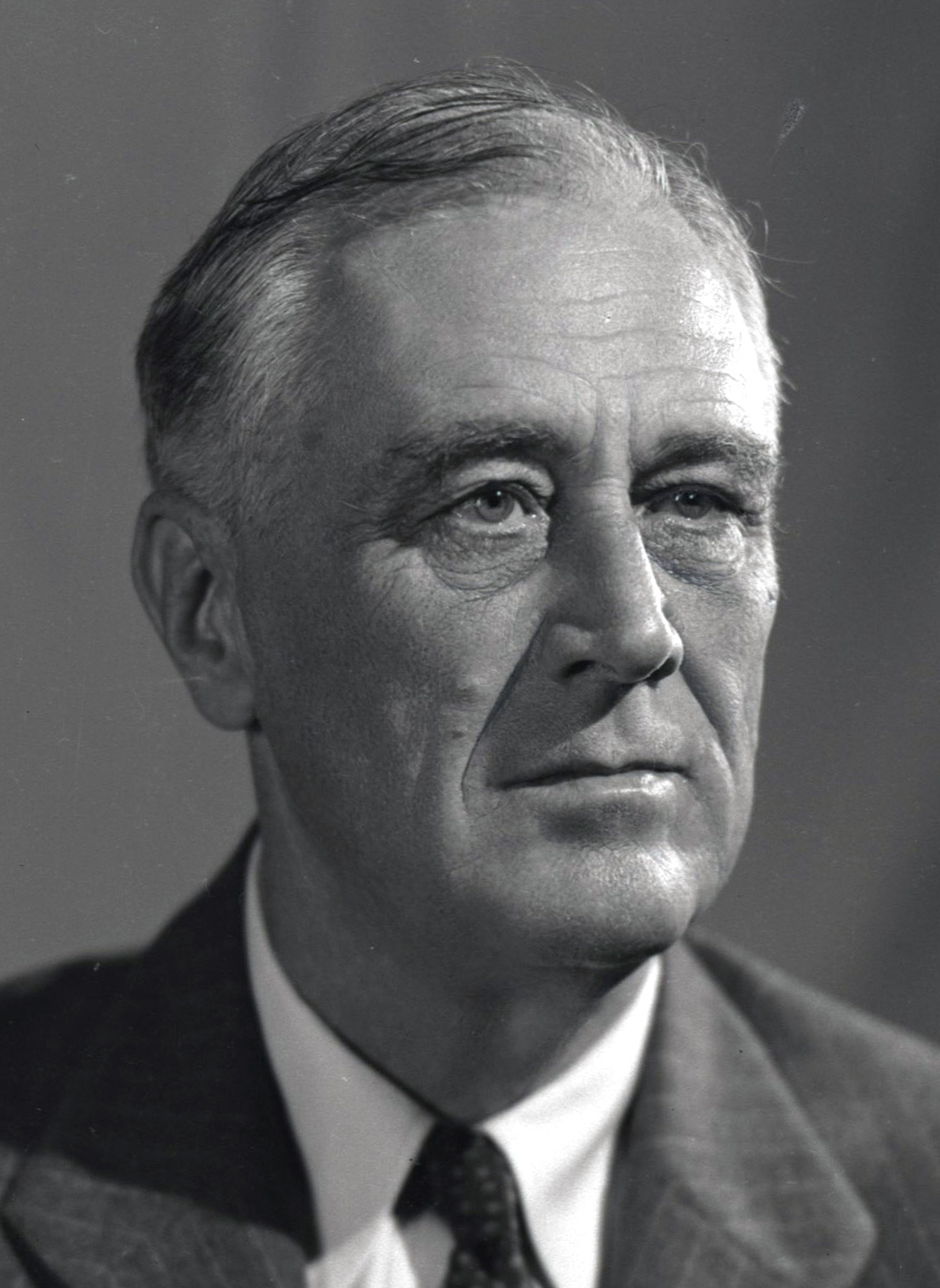
January 20:Franklin D. Roosevelt, the 32nd president of the United States, begins his fourth term

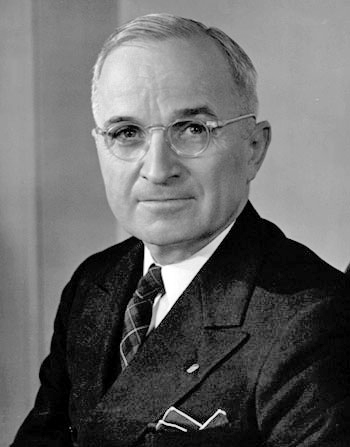
Harry S. Truman becomes the 34th U.S. vice president

- January – American troops cross the Siegfried Line into Belgium.
- January 6
  - Naval lieutenant George H. W. Bush, future president of the United States, and future First Lady Barbara Pierce marry in Rye, New York.
  - Pepe Le Pew makes his debut as the first major Looney Tunes character, in "Odor-able Kitty"
- January 20 – Franklin D. Roosevelt is inaugurated to an unprecedented fourth term as President of the United States. No president before, or since, reaches a third term in office. Harry S. Truman is sworn in as Vice President of the United States.
- January 24 – Nine OSS men and Associated Press war correspondent Joseph Morton are summarily executed by the Germans at Mauthausen concentration camp, contrary to the Geneva Convention.
- January 30 – Raid at Cabanatuan: 121 American soldiers and 800 Filipino guerrillas free 813 American POWs from the Japanese-held camp in Cabanatuan, Philippines.
- January 31 – Eddie Slovik is executed by firing squad for desertion, the first American soldier since the American Civil War, and last to date to be executed for this offense.

=== February ===
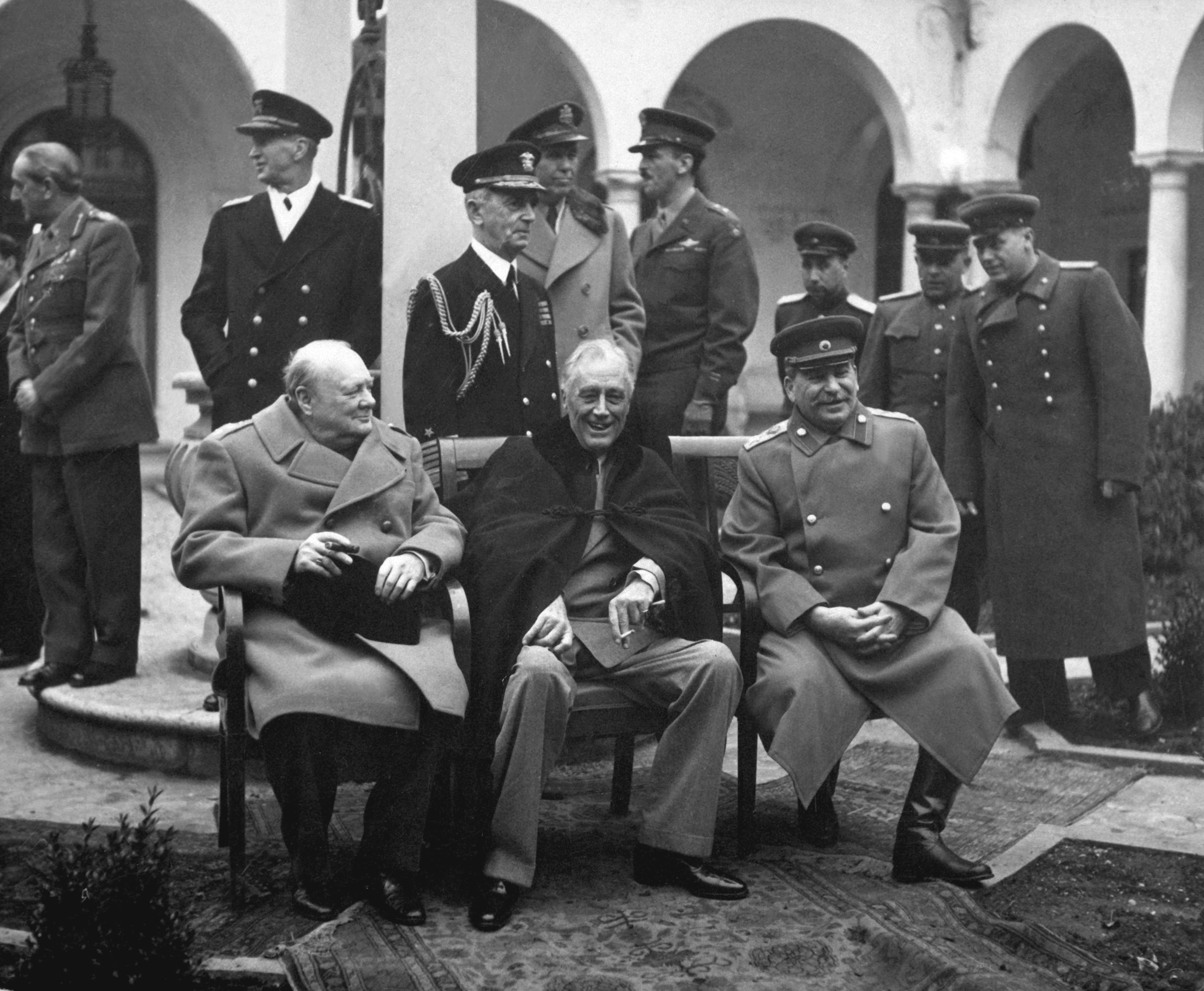
February 4–11: Yalta Conference

- February 2 – WW II: President Franklin D. Roosevelt and British Prime Minister Winston Churchill leave to meet with Soviet leader Joseph Stalin at the Yalta Conference.
- February 3
  - WW II: United States forces capture Manila, Philippines from the Japanese Imperial Army.
  - Walt Disney Productions' seventh feature film, The Three Caballeros, is released. It is Disney's second of six package films to be released through the 1940s and the first feature film to incorporate traditional animation with live-action actors.
- February 4 – WW II: President Franklin D. Roosevelt, Prime Minister of the United Kingdom Winston Churchill and Soviet leader Joseph Stalin begin the Yalta Conference (ends February 11).
- February 7 – WW II: General Douglas MacArthur returns to Manila.
- February 8 – The Alaska Anti-Discrimination Act of 1945, championed by charismatic native leader Elizabeth Peratrovich, is passed by the territorial Senate, after the legislature defeated a previous bill in 1943.
- February 12 – A devastating tornado outbreak in Mississippi and Alabama kills 45 people and injures 427 others.
- February 16
  - Combined American and Filipino forces recapture the Bataan Peninsula.
  - American and Filipino ground forces land on Corregidor Island in the Philippines.
- February 19 – WW II: Battle of Iwo Jima – About 30,000 United States Marines land on Iwo Jima.
- February 23
  - The American and Filipino troops enter Intramuros, Manila.
  - The capital of the Philippines, Manila, is liberated by combined American and Filipino ground troops.
  - Battle of Iwo Jima: A group of United States Marines reach the top of Mount Suribachi on the island and are photographed raising the American flag. The photo, Raising the Flag on Iwo Jima (taken by Joe Rosenthal), later wins a Pulitzer Prize.
- February – Raymond L. Libby of American Cyanamid's research laboratories, at Stamford, Connecticut, announces a method of orally administering the antibiotic penicillin.

=== March ===
- March 1 – President Franklin D. Roosevelt gives what will be his last address to a joint session of Congress, reporting on the Yalta Conference.
- March 2 – Former Vice President Henry A. Wallace starts his tenure as U.S. Secretary of Commerce, serving under President Roosevelt.
- March 3 – WW II: United States and Filipino troops take Manila, Philippines.
- March 7 – WW II: American troops seize the bridge over the Rhine River at Remagen, Germany and begin to cross.
- March 15 – The 17th Academy Awards ceremony, hosted by John Cromwell and Bob Hope, is held at Grauman's Chinese Theater in Hollywood, Los Angeles, broadcast via radio for the first time. Leo McCarey's Going My Way wins Outstanding Motion Picture. The film also wins the most awards overall with seven, including McCarey's second win for Best Director, and ties for the most nominations with Henry King's Wilson, both with ten.
- March 19 – WW II: Off the coast of Japan, bombers hit the aircraft carrier USS Franklin, killing about 800 of her crewmen and crippling the ship.
- March 24 – The cartoon character Sylvester the cat debuts in Life with Feathers
- March 29 – The "Clash of Titans" in basketball: George Mikan and Bob Kurland duel at Madison Square Garden as OSU defeats DePaul 52–44.

=== April ===
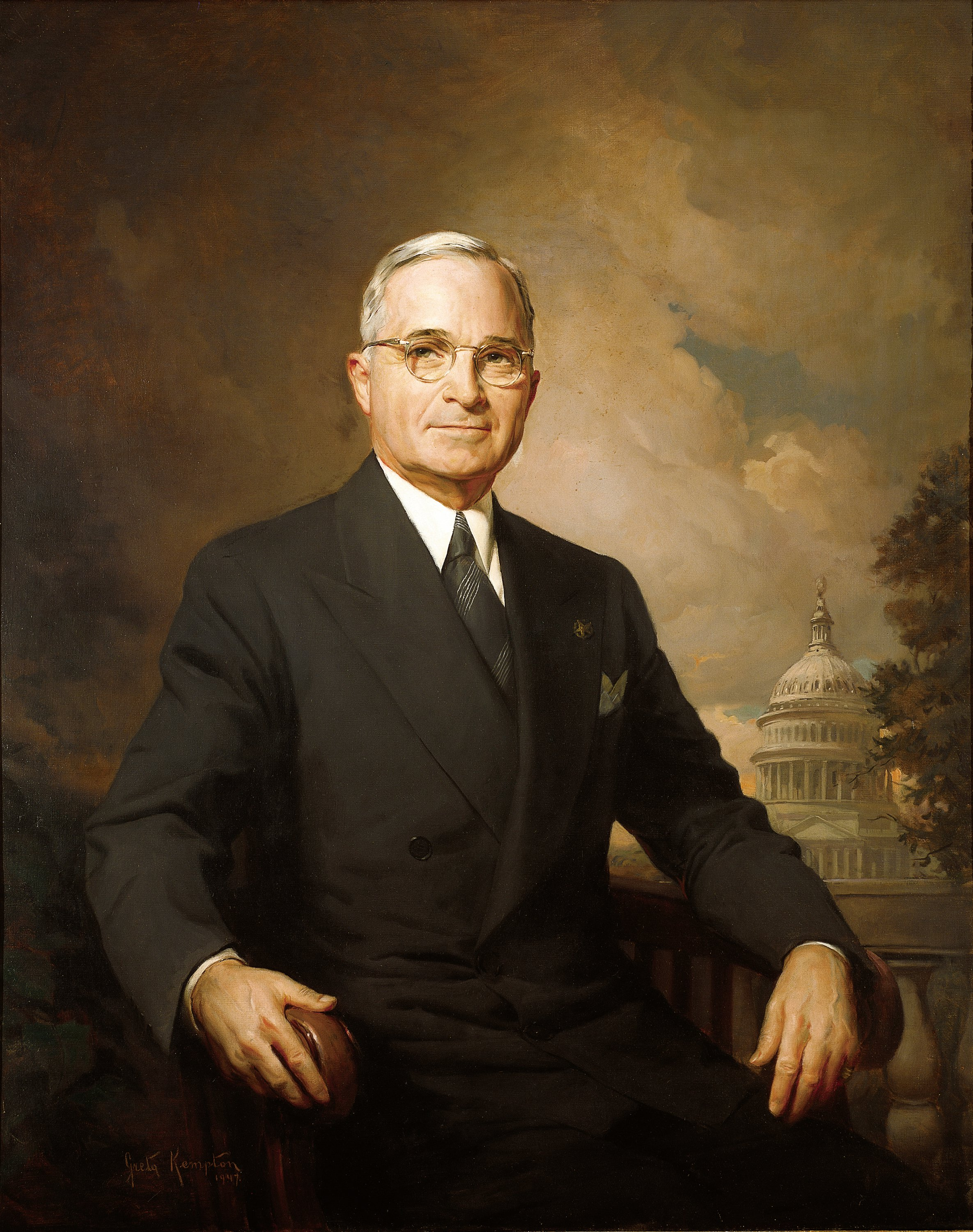
April 12: Vice President Harry S. Truman becomes the 33rd U.S. president upon the death of President Franklin D. Roosevelt

- April 1 – WW II: Battle of Okinawa – U.S. troops land on Okinawa.
- April 4 – The Holocaust: American troops liberate their first Nazi concentration camp, Ohrdruf death camp in Germany.
- April 7 – The only flight of the German ramming unit known as the Sonderkommando Elbe takes place, resulting in the loss of some 24 B-17s and B-24s of the United States Eighth Air Force.
- April 12 – President Franklin D. Roosevelt dies suddenly at Warm Springs, Georgia; Vice President Harry S. Truman becomes the 33rd president.
- April 18 – The American war correspondent Ernie Pyle is killed by Japanese machine gun fire on the island of Ie Shima off Okinawa.
- April 19 – Rodgers and Hammerstein's Carousel, a musical play based on Ferenc Molnár's Liliom, opens on Broadway and becomes their second long-running stage classic.
- April 25
  - WW II: Elbe Day – United States and Soviet troops link up at the Elbe River, cutting Germany in two.
  - Founding negotiations for the United Nations begin in San Francisco.
- April 27 – U.S. Ordnance troops find the coffins of 18th-century Prussian kings Frederick Wilhelm I and Frederick the Great, in addition to German President Paul von Hindenburg and his wife.
- April 30 – Adolf Hitler commits suicide by shooting himself with a gun in an underground bunker. Eva Braun, his wife, bit into a cyanide capsule.

=== May ===
- May 3 – Rocket scientist Wernher von Braun and 120 members of his team surrender to U.S. forces (later he becomes at the forefront and a pioneer of the U.S. space program).
- May 4 – The Holy Crown of Hungary is found in Mattsee, Austria, by the United States Army 86th Infantry Division. The U.S. government keeps the crown in Fort Knox for safekeeping from the Soviets until it is returned to Hungary on January 6, 1978.
- May 5
  - A Japanese Fu-Go balloon bomb kills five children and a grown woman, Elsie Mitchell, near Bly, Oregon, when it explodes as they drag it from the woods. They are the only people killed by an enemy attack on the American mainland during World War II.
  - The US 11th Armored Division liberates the prisoners of Mauthausen concentration camp, including Simon Wiesenthal.
  - Expatriate American poet and author Ezra Pound turns himself in to American soldiers in Italy and is imprisoned for treason.
  - The cartoon character Yosemite Sam debuts in Hare Trigger.
- May 8
  - Victory in Europe Day: The Allies accept Germany's unconditional surrender. War in Europe is over
  - Hermann Göring surrenders himself to the U.S. Army near Radstadt.

=== June ===
- June 22 – WWII: Battle of Okinawa ends, with U.S. occupation of the island until 1972.
- June 26 – The United Nations Charter is signed in San Francisco.
- June 30 – John von Neumann's First Draft of a Report on the EDVAC is distributed, containing the first published description of the logical design of a computer, with stored-program and instruction data stored in the same address space within the memory (von Neumann architecture).

=== July ===
- July 8 – WW II: President Harry S. Truman is informed that Japan will talk peace if it can retain the Emperor.
- July 9 – A forest fire breaks out in the Tillamook Burn (the third in that area of Oregon since 1933).
- July 15 – The Scott Morrison Award of Minor Hockey Excellence is first given; the first recipient is Gordie Howe.
- July 16 – The Trinity test detonates the world's first atomic bomb.
- July 21 – WW II: President Harry S. Truman approves the order for atomic bombs to be used against Japan.
- July 28 – A U.S. Army Air Forces B-25 bomber crashes into the Empire State Building, killing 14 people, including all on board.
- July 30 – WW II: The heavy cruiser USS Indianapolis is hit and sunk by torpedoes from the I-58 in the Philippine Sea. Some 900 survivors jump into the sea and are adrift for up to four days. Nearly 600 die before help arrives. Captain Charles B. McVay III of the cruiser is later court-martialed and convicted; in 2000, he is posthumously exonerated.

=== August ===
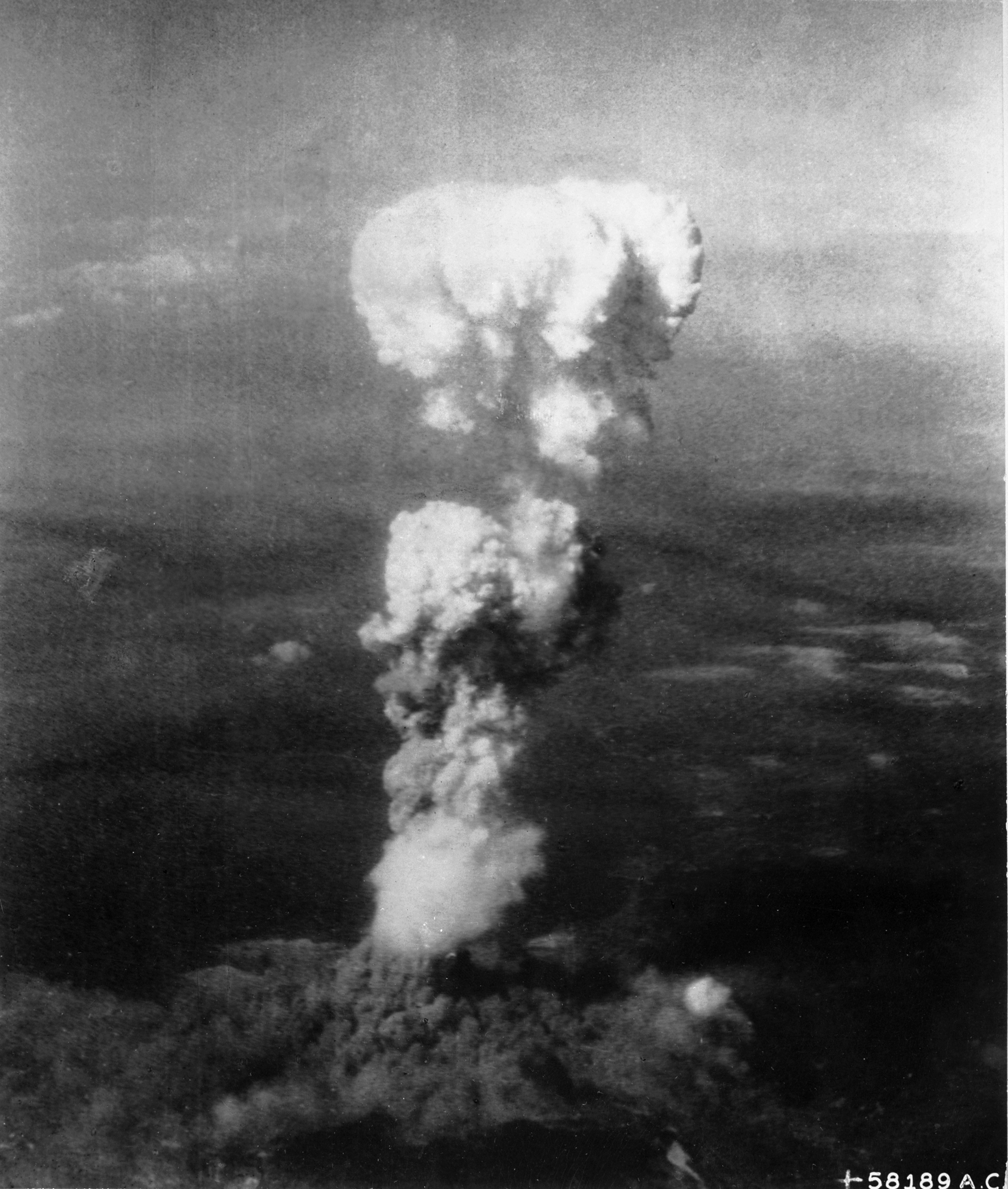
August 6: Atomic bombing of Hiroshima

- August 6 – WW II: Atomic bombing of Hiroshima – United States Boeing B-29 Superfortress Enola Gay drops a uranium-235 atomic bomb, codenamed "Little Boy", on the Japanese city of Hiroshima at 8:15 a.m. local time, resulting in between 90,000 and 146,000 deaths.
- August 7 – President Harry Truman announces the successful bombing of Hiroshima with the atomic bomb, while returning from the Potsdam Conference aboard the U.S. Navy heavy cruiser USS Augusta in the middle of the Atlantic Ocean.
- August 8 – The United Nations Charter is ratified by the United States Senate, and this nation becomes the third one to join the new international organization.
- August 9 – Atomic bombing of Nagasaki: United States B-29 Bockscar drops a plutonium-239 atomic bomb, codenamed "Fat Man", on the Japanese city of Nagasaki at 11:02 a.m. local time, resulting in between 39,000 and 80,000 deaths.
- August 14 (August 15 in Japan) – Emperor Hirohito announces Japan's surrender on the radio. The United States calls this day V-J Day (Victory over Japan). This ends the period of Japanese expansionism and begins the period of Occupied Japan.
- August 17 – The United States and the U.S.S.R. split up the Korean Peninsula making North Korea and South Korea
- August 31 – A team at American Cyanamid's Lederle Laboratories, Pearl River, New York, led by Yellapragada Subbarow, announces they have obtained folic acid in a pure crystalline form.

=== September ===
- September 2
  - World War II ends: The final official surrender of Japan is accepted by the Supreme Allied Commander, General Douglas MacArthur, and Fleet Admiral Chester Nimitz for the United States, and delegates from Australia, New Zealand, the United Kingdom, The Netherlands, China, and others from a Japanese delegation led by Mamoru Shigemitsu, on board the American battleship USS Missouri in Tokyo Bay (but in Japan August 14 is recognized as the day the Pacific War ended).
  - General MacArthur is given the title of Supreme Commander Allied Powers and tasked with the occupation of Japan.
  - Japanese general Tomoyuki Yamashita surrenders to Filipino and American forces at Kiangan, Ifugao.
- September 5
  - The Russian code clerk Igor Gouzenko comes forward with numerous documents implicating the Soviet Union in numerous spy rings in North America: both in the United States and in Canada.
  - Iva Toguri D'Aquino, a Japanese-American suspected of being wartime radio propagandist "Tokyo Rose", is arrested in Yokohama.
- September 8 – American troops occupy southern Korea, while the Soviet Union occupies the north, with the dividing line being the 38th parallel of latitude. This arrangement proves to be the indirect beginning of a divided Korea.
- September 9 – The first actual case of a (computer) bug being found, is a moth lodged in a relay of a Harvard Mark II computer at the Naval Weapons Center in Dahlgren, Virginia.
- September 15-16 - Hurricane Nine, or known as the 1945 Homestead Hurricane, made landfall and affected Florida, the first intense storm to do so in the state since 1935. The hurricane made landfall in Key Largo and Dade County, killing 4 people in Florida and 22 others in The Bahamas and in the islands of the Turks And Caicos.
- September 20 – The Office of Strategic Services (OSS) is disbanded and split up among several other agencies.

=== October ===
- October 2 – George Albert Smith becomes president of the Church of Jesus Christ of Latter-day Saints.
- October 3–10 – The Detroit Tigers win the World Series against the Chicago Cubs.
- October 5 – Hollywood Black Friday: A strike by the Set Decorator's Union in Hollywood results in a riot.
- October 23 – Jackie Robinson signs a contract with the Montreal Royals, making him the first black baseball player in the International League since the 1880s.
- October 29 – At Gimbel's Department Store in New York City, the first ballpoint pens go on sale at $12.50 each.

=== November ===
- November 15 – Harry S. Truman, Clement Attlee, and Mackenzie King call for a U.N. Atomic Energy Commission.
- November 16
  - Cold War: The United States controversially imports 88 German scientists to help in the production of rocket technology.
  - The cartoon character Casper the Friendly Ghost debuts, in The Friendly Ghost.
  - The motion picture The Lost Weekend, starring Ray Milland, is released. The most realistic film portrayal of alcoholism up to this time, it wins several Academy Awards the following year.
  - Yeshiva College is founded in New York City.
- November 29 – Assembly of the world's first general purpose electronic computer, the Electronic Numerical Integrator Analyzer and Computer (ENIAC), is completed, covering 1,800 square feet (170 m^{2}) of floor space, and the first set of calculations is run on it.

=== December ===
- December 4 – By a vote of 65–7, the United States Senate approves the entry of the United States into the United Nations.
- December 5 – Flight 19 of U.S. Navy Grumman TBF Avenger torpedo bombers disappears on a training exercise from Naval Air Station Fort Lauderdale.
- December 9 – General George S. Patton is injured in an automobile accident in Germany, resulting in his death on December 21.
- December 24 – Sodder children disappearance: Five of nine children go missing after their home in Fayetteville, West Virginia, is burned down.

=== Undated ===
- The U.S. House of Representatives calls for unrestricted Jewish immigration to Palestine in order to establish a Jewish commonwealth there.
- The Berklee College of Music is founded in Boston.
- The Galleries Maurice Sternberg is established in Chicago.
- Russian-American physicist Vladimir Kosma Zworykin coauthors Electron Optics and the Electron Microscope.

== Ongoing ==
- World War II, U.S. involvement (1941–1945; ends on September 2)

== Births ==
=== January ===
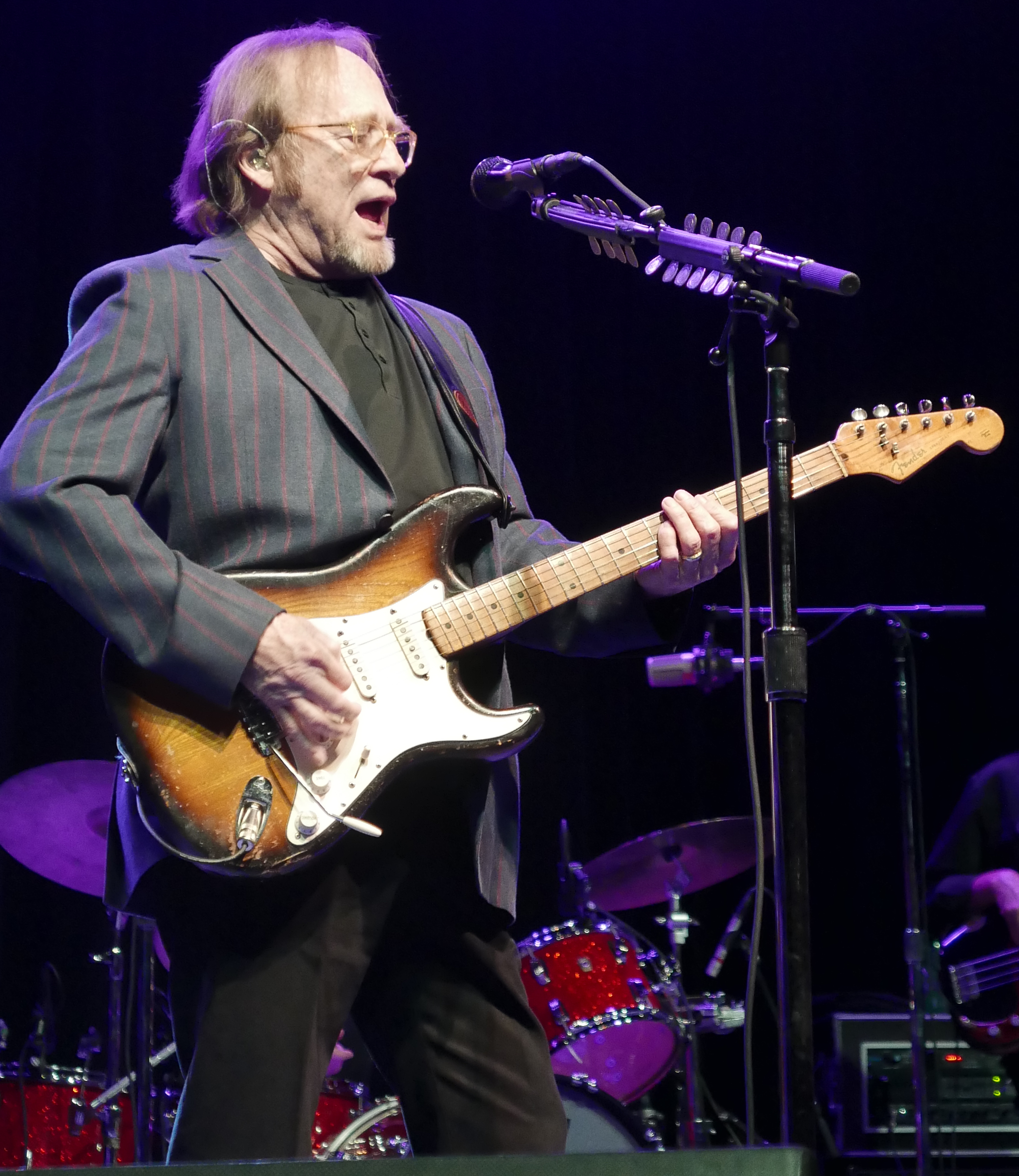
Stephen Stills

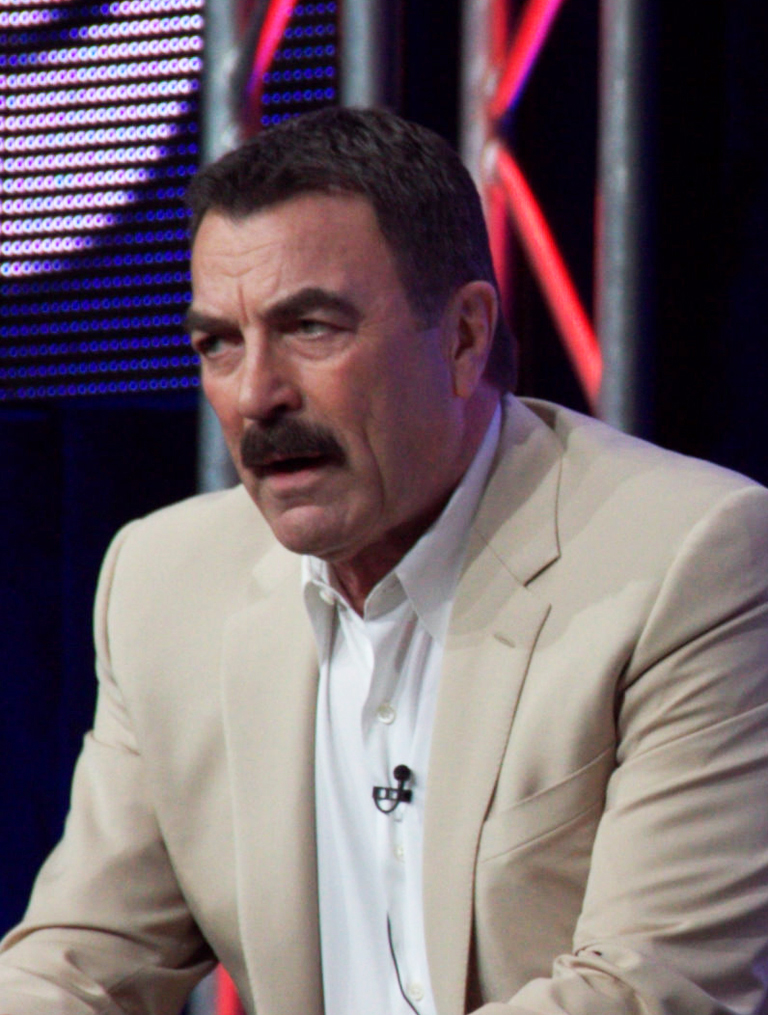
Tom Selleck

- January 3 – Stephen Stills, American rock singer, songwriter (Crosby, Stills, Nash & Young)
- January 4 – Richard R. Schrock, American chemist, recipient of the Nobel Prize in Chemistry in 2005
- January 5 – Lynn Di Nino, American artist
- January 6
  - Allen Appel, American author, illustrator, and photographer
  - Barry Lopez, American author (d. 2020)
- January 7
  - Tony Conigliaro, American baseball player (d. 1990)
  - Tom Reed, American football player and coach (d. 2022)
- January 10 – Steven P. Perskie, American politician, judge
- January 12 – Steven Hoffenberg, American businessman and fraudster (d. 2022)
- January 15 – Vince Foster, American deputy White House counsel during the first term of President Bill Clinton (d. 1993)
- January 20
  - Dave Boswell, American baseball player (d. 2012)
  - Robert Olen Butler, American writer
  - Susan Rothenberg, American painter (d. 2020)
- January 22
  - Jophery Brown, American baseball player, actor and stuntman (d. 2014)
  - Isaiah Jackson, American conductor (d. 2025)
- January 25 – Leigh Taylor-Young, American actress
- January 28
  - Frank Doubleday, actor (d. 2018)
  - Karen Lynn Gorney, actress (Saturday Night Fever)
  - Chuck Pyle, country-folk singer-songwriter (d. 2015)
  - John Perkins, author and activist
- January 29 – Tom Selleck, American actor (Magnum, P.I.)
- January 30 – Michael Dorris, American author (d. 1997)
- January 31 – Joseph Kosuth, American artist

=== February ===
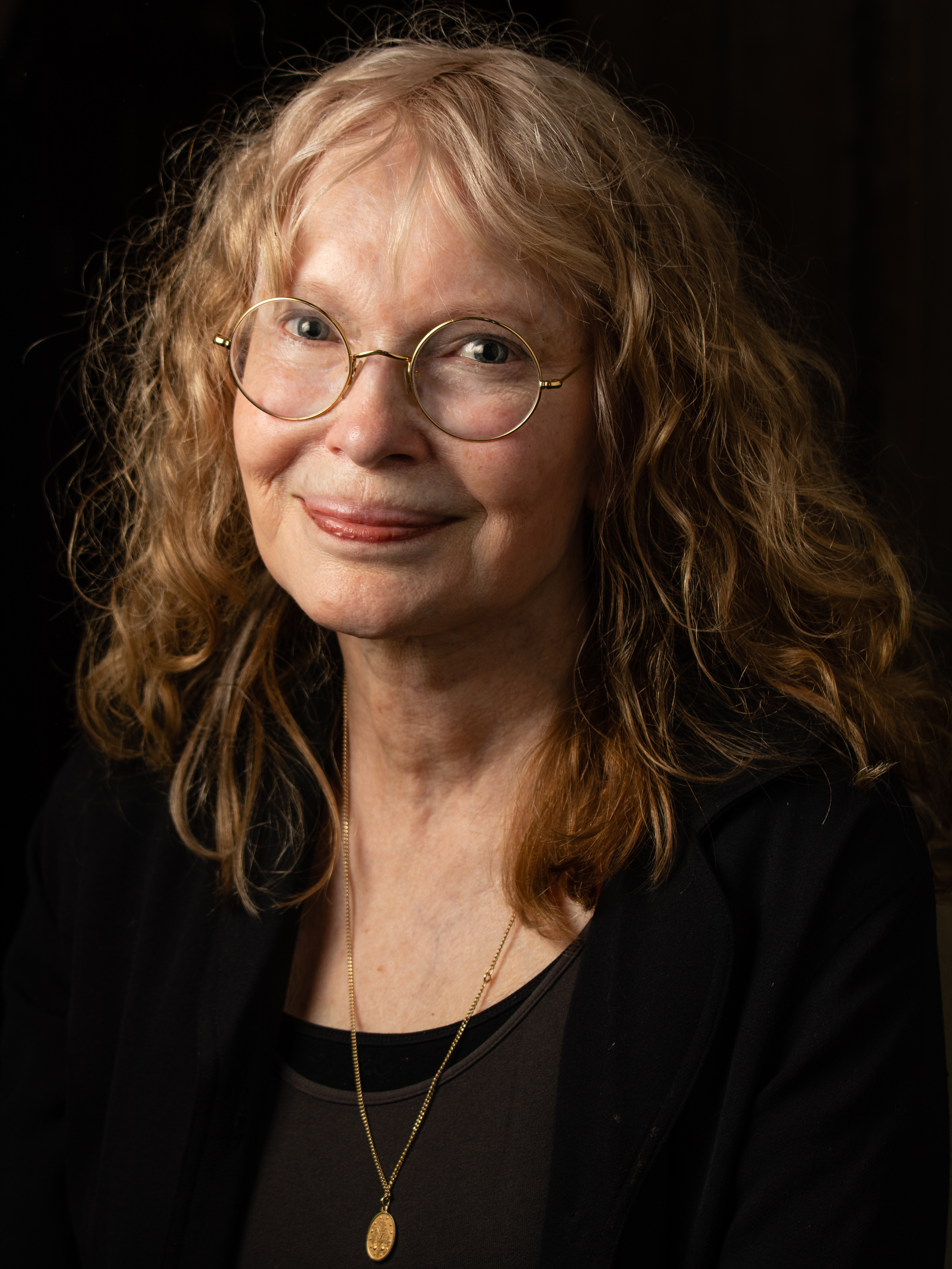
Mia Farrow

- February 3 – Bob Griese, American football player
- February 5 – Sarah Weddington, attorney and law professor (d. 2021)
- February 9
  - Bill Bergey, American football player (d. 2024)
  - Mia Farrow, actress
- February 12 – David D. Friedman, economist
- February 15 – Douglas Hofstadter, cognitive scientist
- February 16
  - Pete Christlieb, jazz musician
  - Elliot Mintz, radio personality and media consultant
- February 17 – Zina Bethune, actress, dancer and choreographer (d. 2012)
- February 19 – Michael Nader, actor (d. 2021)
- February 20
  - Henry Polic II, actor (d. 2013)
  - George Smoot, astrophysicist, winner of the Nobel Prize in Physics (d. 2025)
- February 22 – Oliver, singer ("Good Morning Starshine") (d. 2000)
- February 24 – Barry Bostwick, actor
- February 26
  - Mitch Ryder, singer-songwriter and guitarist
  - Roy Saari, swimmer (d. 2008)
- February 27 – Carl Anderson, singer, actor (Jesus Christ Superstar) (d. 2004)
- February 28 – Bubba Smith, American football player, actor (d. 2011)

=== March ===
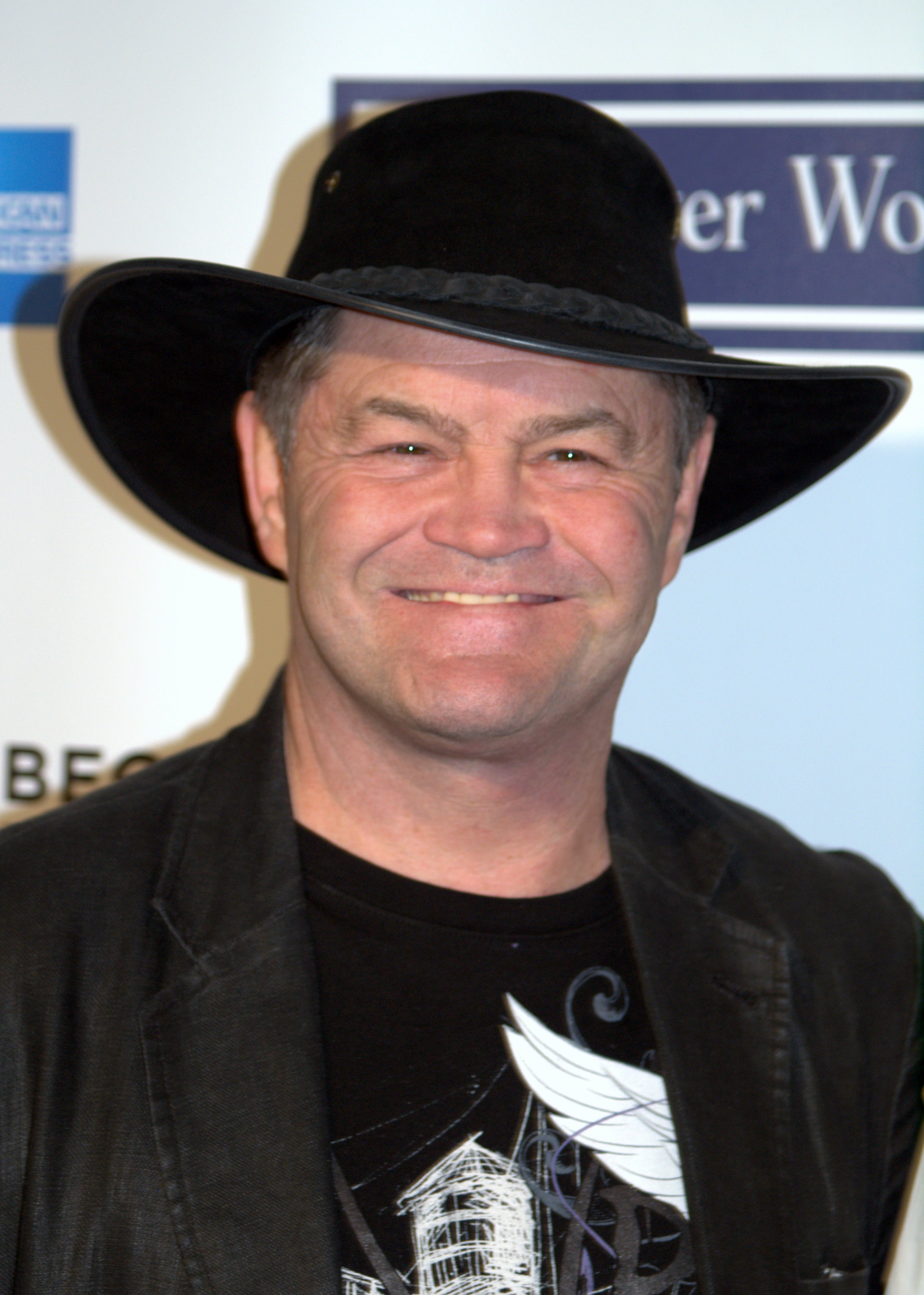
Micky Dolenz

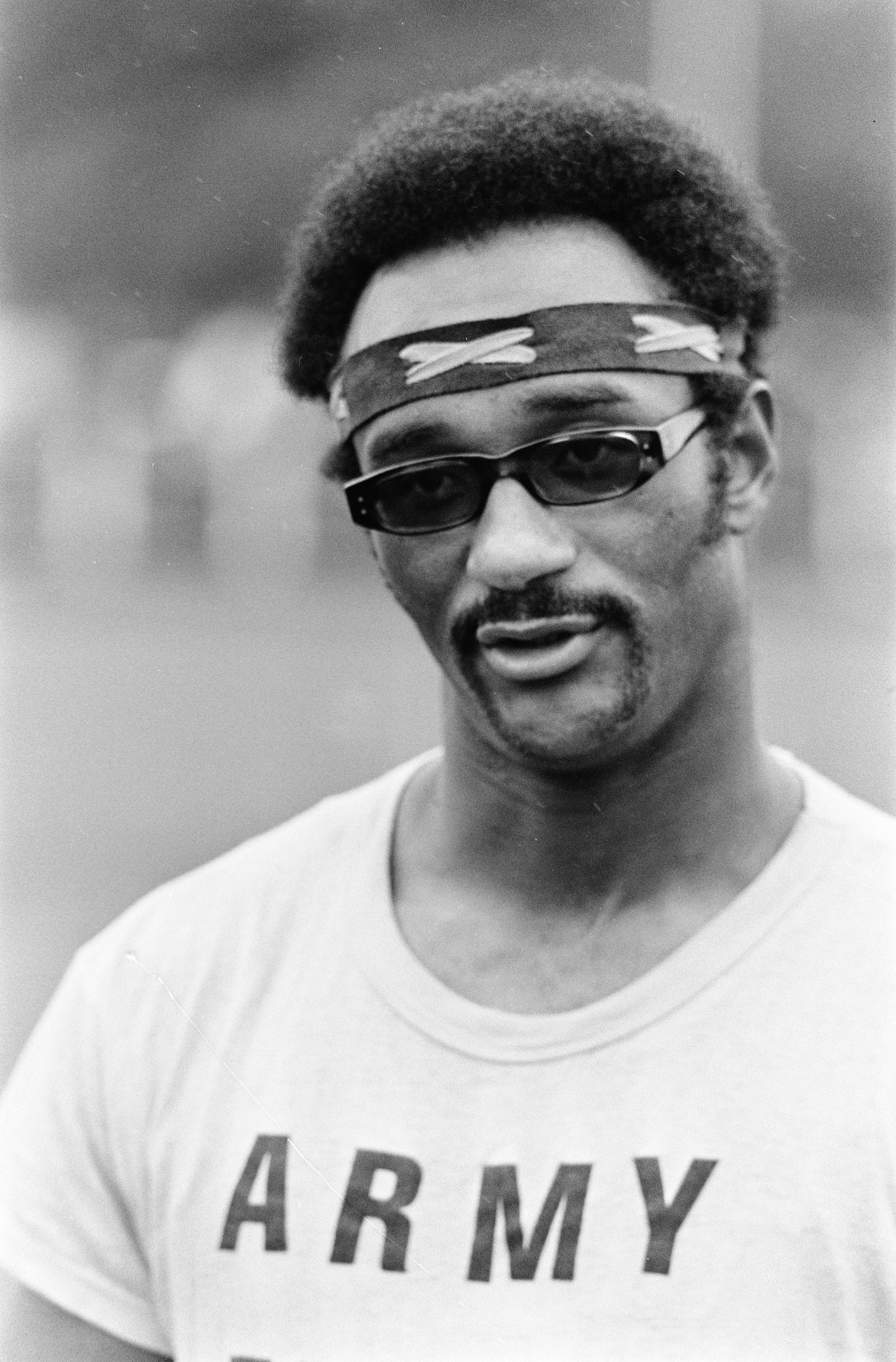
Charles Greene

- March 1 – Dirk Benedict, American actor
- March 2 – Joy Garrett, American actress and vocalist (d. 1993)
- March 3 – Hattie Winston, American actress
- March 4 – Gary Williams, American basketball coach
- March 6 – Bob Trumpy, American football player and sports commentator (d. 2025)
- March 7 – Arthur Lee, American musician (d. 2006)
- March 8
  - Jim Chapman, American politician
  - Micky Dolenz, American actor, director and rock musician (The Monkees)
- March 9 – Dennis Rader, American serial killer
- March 12
  - Sammy Gravano, American mobster
  - Bobby Prince, American video game composer (d. 2026)
- March 14
  - Michael Martin Murphey, American singer-songwriter and guitarist
  - Walter Parazaider, American saxophonist (Chicago) (d. 2026)
- March 16 – Douglas Ahlstedt, American operatic tenor (d. 2023)
- March 18
  - Michael Reagan, American political commentator (d. 2026)
  - Chuck E. Weiss, American songwriter and vocalist (d. 2021)
- March 20 – Pat Riley, American basketball coach
- March 21 – Charles Greene, American Olympic athlete (d. 2022)
- March 22 – Sheila Frahm, American politician
- March 24 – Curtis Hanson, American film director, screenwriter (d. 2016)
- March 29 – Walt Frazier, American basketball player
- March 31
  - Edwin Catmull, American computer scientist
  - Gabe Kaplan, American actor, comedian, and professional poker player

=== April ===
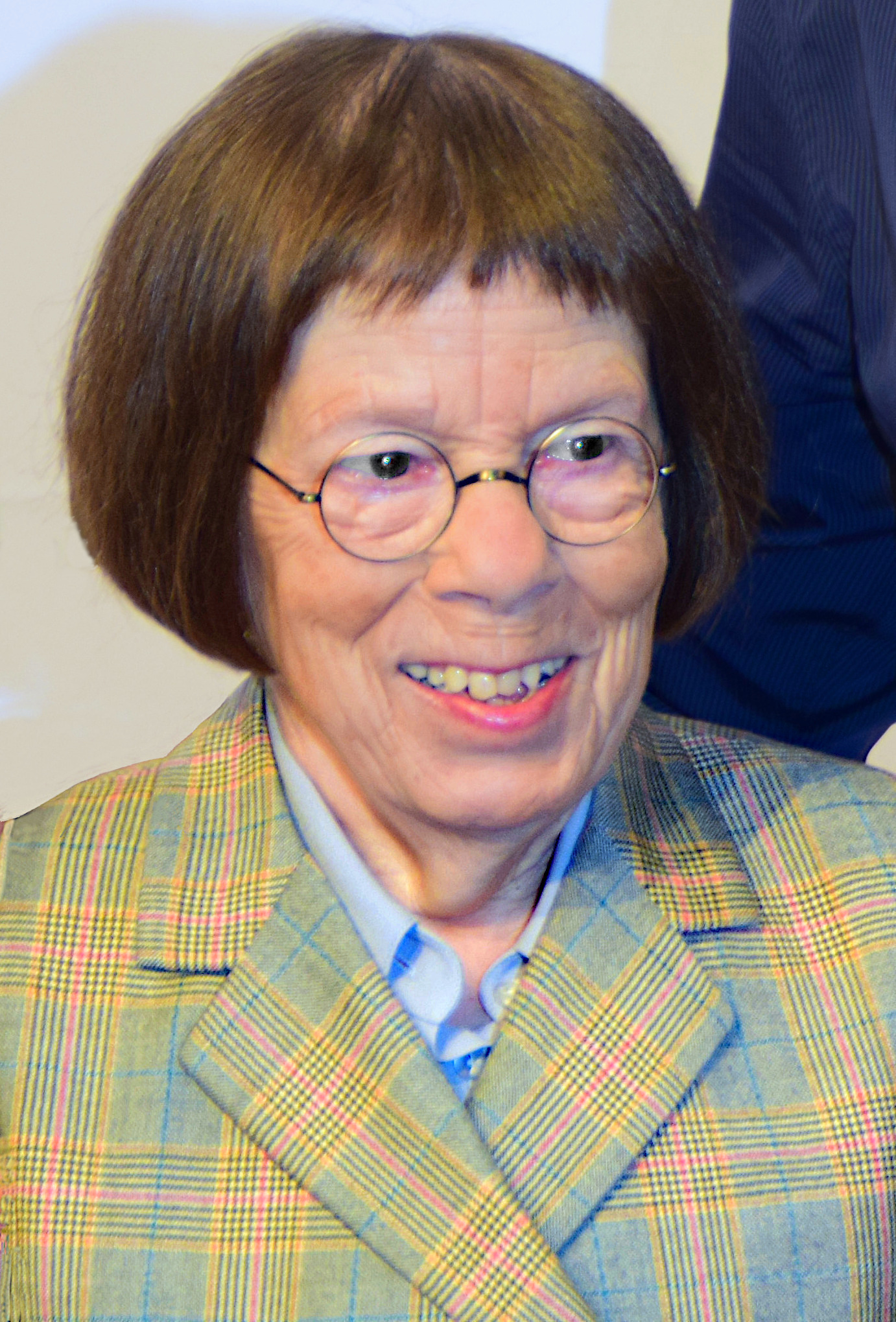
Linda Hunt

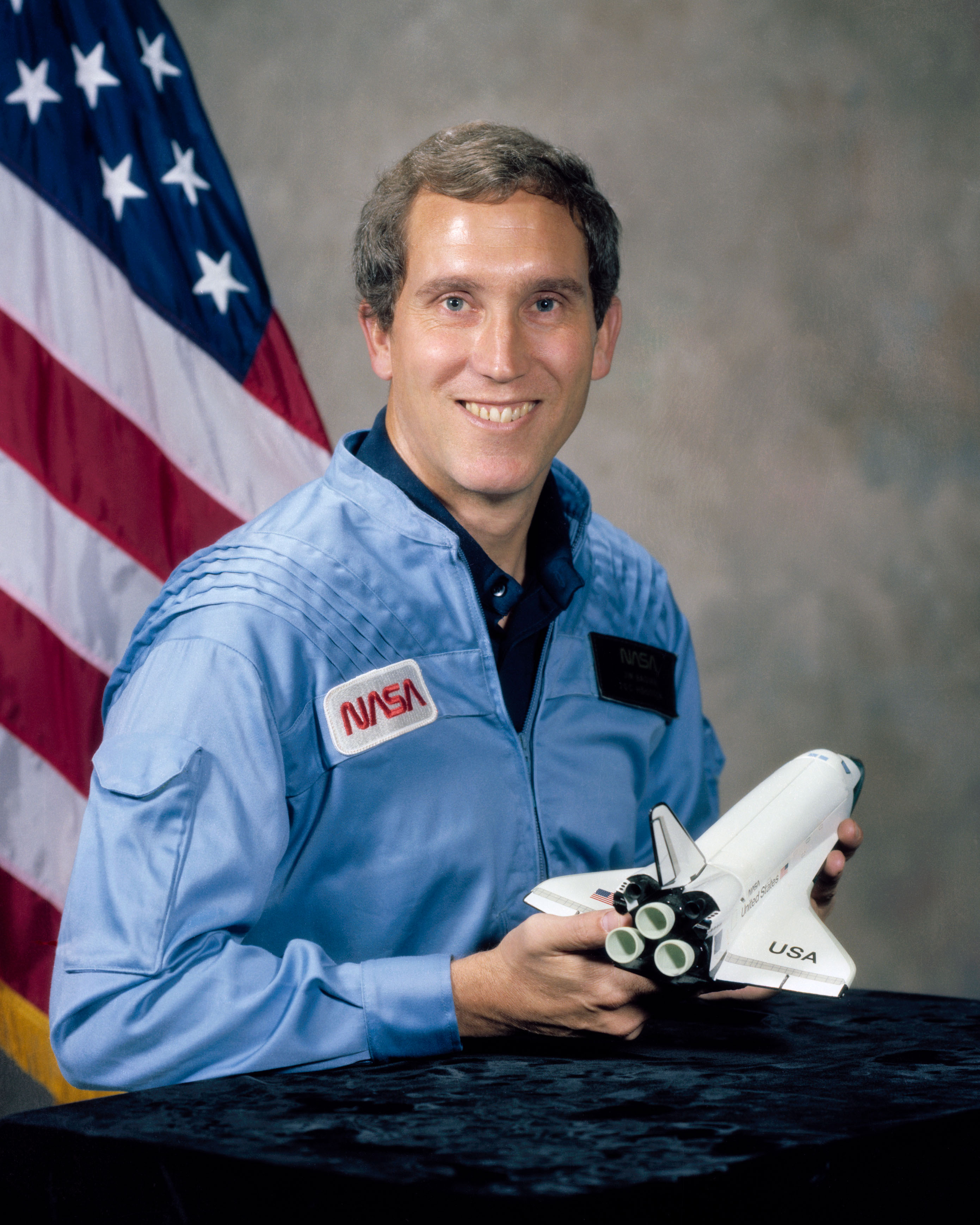
Michael J. Smith

- April 2
  - Linda Hunt, actress
  - Richard Taruskin, musicologist (d. 2022)
- April 9 – Peter Gammons, baseball sportswriter
- April 10
  - Dotty Fothergill, ten-pin bowler (d. 2025)
  - Shirley Walker, composer and conductor for film and television (d. 2006)
- April 11 – George W. Owings III, politician (d. 2023)
- April 13
  - Joan Acocella, dance critic (d. 2024)
  - Tony Dow, actor, producer, and director (Leave It to Beaver) (d. 2022)
  - Lowell George, rock musician (Little Feat) (d. 1979)
  - Bob Kalsu, American football player (d. 1970)
- April 16 – John Andrew Barnes III, soldier (d. 1967)
- April 20
  - Bobby Jameson, singer, songwriter (d. 2015)
  - Steve Spurrier, American football player and coach
  - Mike the Headless Chicken, Wyandotte chicken, lived 18 months following decapitation (d. 1947)
- April 24
  - Doug Clifford, drummer
  - Bob Lunn, golfer
- April 25 – Stu Cook, bassist
- April 27 – August Wilson, playwright (d. 2005)
- April 29 – Tammi Terrell, African-American soul singer (d. 1970)
- April 30
  - Ray Miller, baseball manager (d. 2021)
  - Michael J. Smith, astronaut (d. 1986)

=== May ===
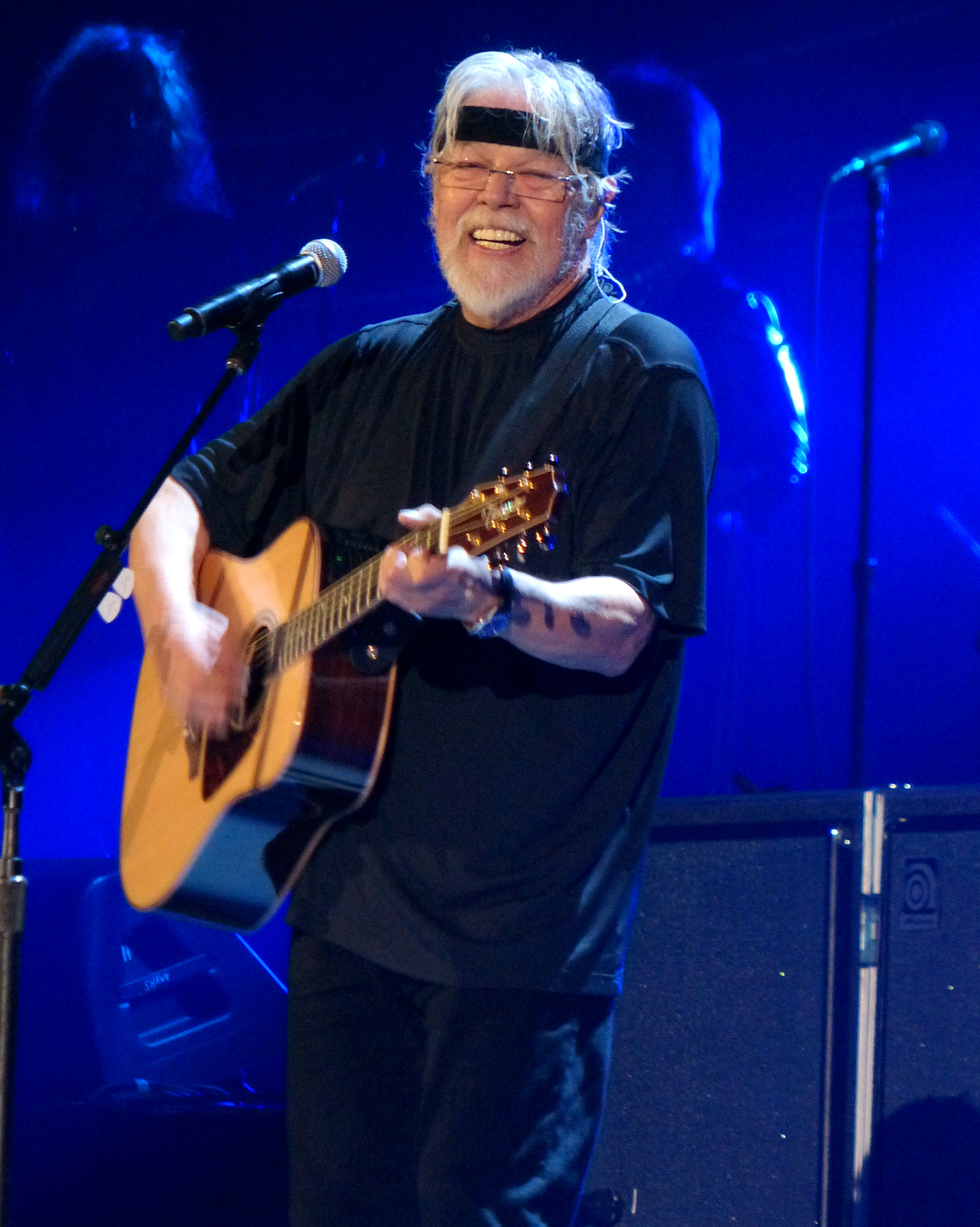
Bob Seger

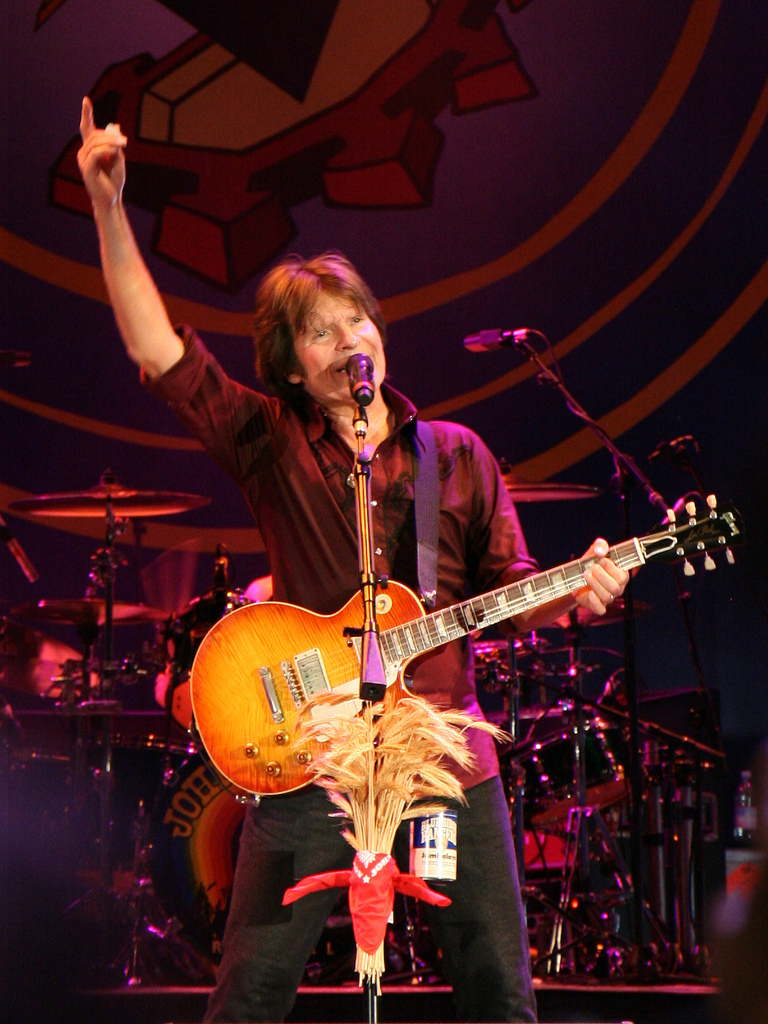
John Fogerty

- May 1
  - Diahnne Abbott, American actress and singer
  - Rita Coolidge, American pop singer
- May 2
  - Mark Klein, American whistleblower (d. 2025)
  - James Vaupel, American scientist (d. 2022)
- May 3
  - Jeffrey C. Hall, American geneticist and chronobiologist, recipient of the Nobel Prize in Physiology or Medicine in 2017
  - Davey Lopes, American baseball player and coach (d. 2026)
- May 5
  - Chuck Holmes, American adult film producer (d. 2000)
  - Kurt Loder, American film critic, author and television personality
- May 6
  - Jimmie Dale Gilmore, American musician
  - Bob Seger, American rock singer ("Old Time Rock and Roll")
- May 8 – Keith Jarrett, American musician
- May 20 – David Keene, American political consultant and editor (d. 2026)
- May 21 – Richard Hatch, American actor (Battlestar Galactica) (d. 2017)
- May 22 – Victoria Wyndham, American actress (Another World)
- May 23 – Lauren Chapin, American child actress, evangelist (d. 2026)
- May 24 – Priscilla Presley, American actress, businesswoman and wife of singer Elvis Presley
- May 28
  - Patch Adams, American physician, comedian, social activist, clown and author
  - John Fogerty, American rock singer (Creedence Clearwater Revival)
- May 30
  - Andrea Bronfman, American philanthropist (d. 2006)
  - Gladys Horton, American singer (The Marvelettes) (d. 2011)
- May 31 – Blackberri, American singer-songwriter and community activist (d. 2021)

=== June ===
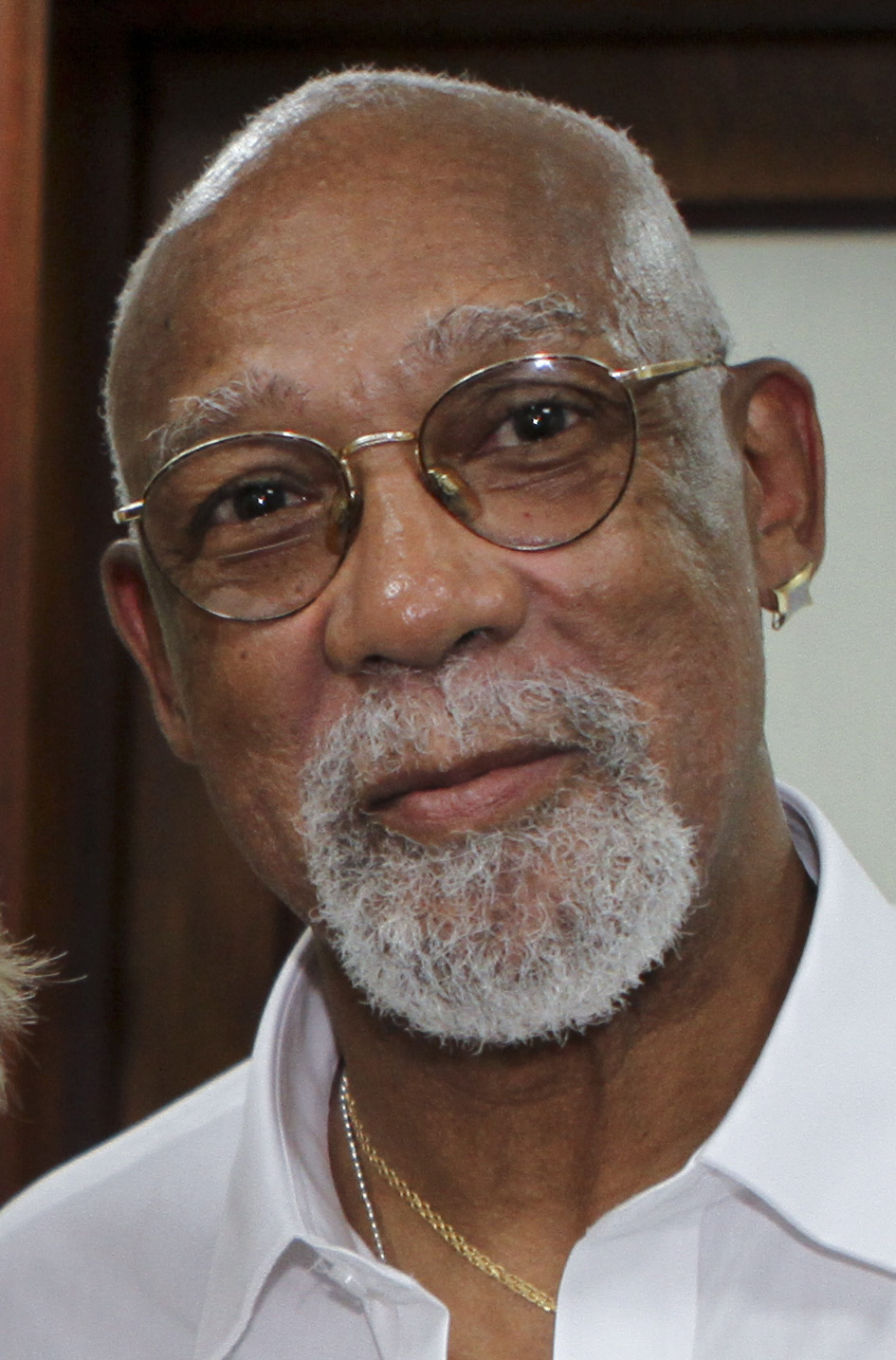
John Carlos

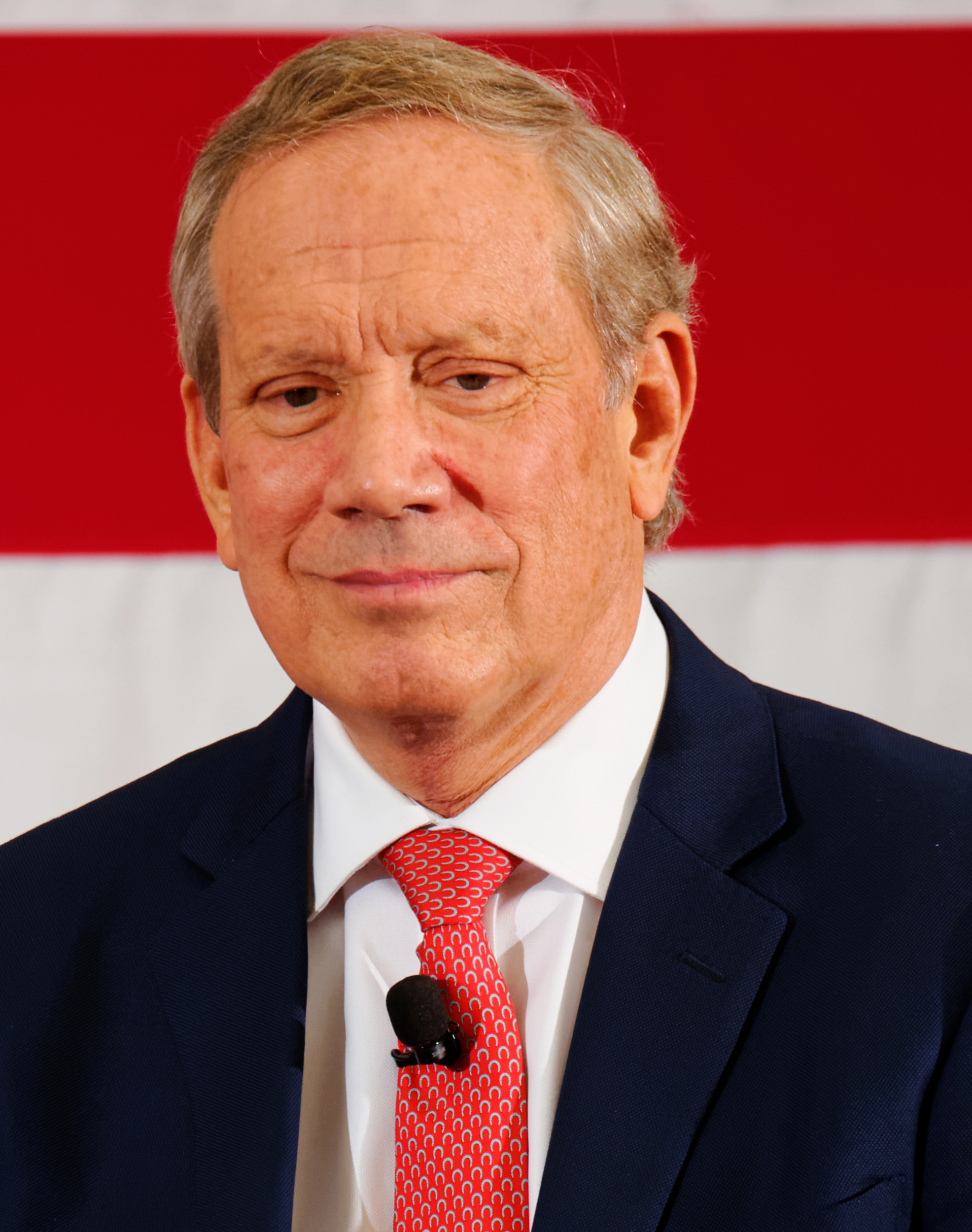
George Pataki

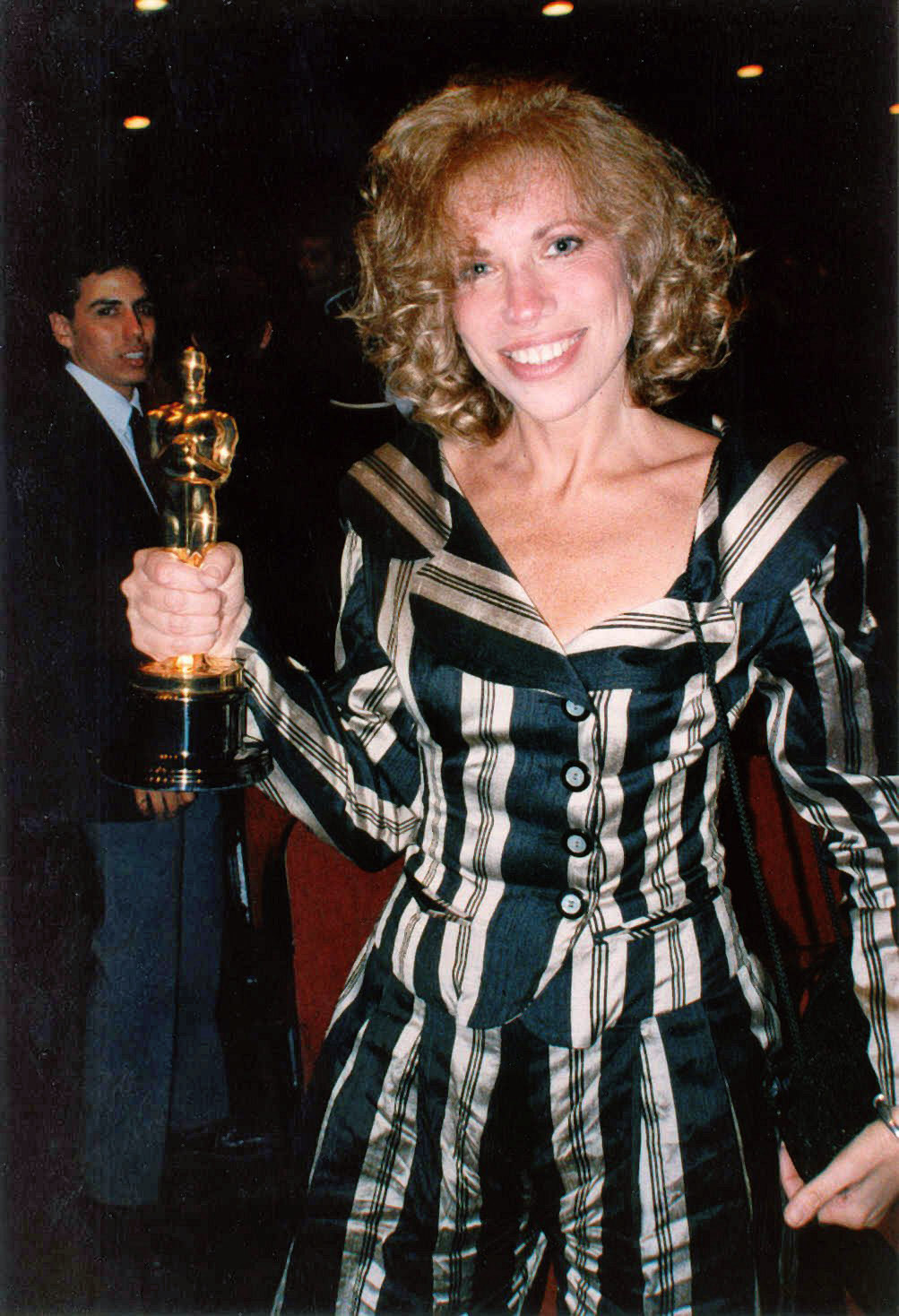
Carly Simon

- June 1
  - Jim McCarty, blues rock guitarist
  - Linda Scott, singer
  - Frederica von Stade, mezzo-soprano
- June 2 – Jon Peters, film producer
- June 3 – Hale Irwin, professional golfer
- June 4 – Anthony Braxton, composer, musical instrumentalist
- June 5
  - John Carlos, athlete
  - Don Reid, country singer (The Statler Brothers)
- June 6 – David Dukes, actor (d. 2000)
- June 7 – Billy Butler, singer, songwriter (d. 2015)
- June 8 – Steven Fromholz, singer, songwriter (d. 2014)
- June 11 – Adrienne Barbeau, actress, television personality and author (Maude)
- June 13 – Rodney P. Rempt, admiral
- June 14 – Bruce Degen, illustrator and writer (d. 2024)
- June 16 – Chip Damiani, drummer (The Remains) (d. 2014)
- June 17
  - Frank Ashmore, actor
  - Art Bell, radio talk show host (Coast to Coast AM) (d. 2018)
- June 19 – Greil Marcus, music journalist, cultural critic
- June 23 – Jim Fouratt, gay activist and entertainer
- June 24 – George Pataki, Governor of New York
- June 25 – Carolyn Cheeks Kilpatrick, politician
- June 26 – Dwight York, musician, fashion consultant, cult leader, and child molester
- June 27 – Norma Kamali, fashion designer
- June 30
  - Jerry Kenney, Major League Baseball infielder
  - James Snyder Jr., author, attorney and politician

=== July ===
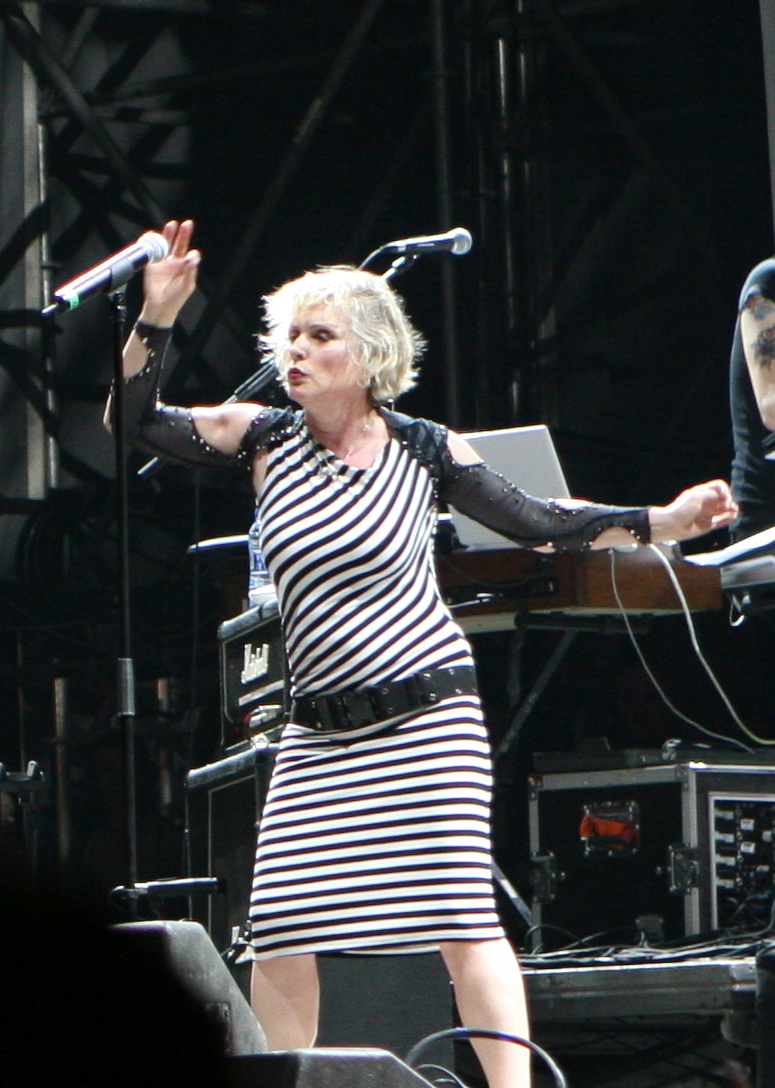
Debbie Harry

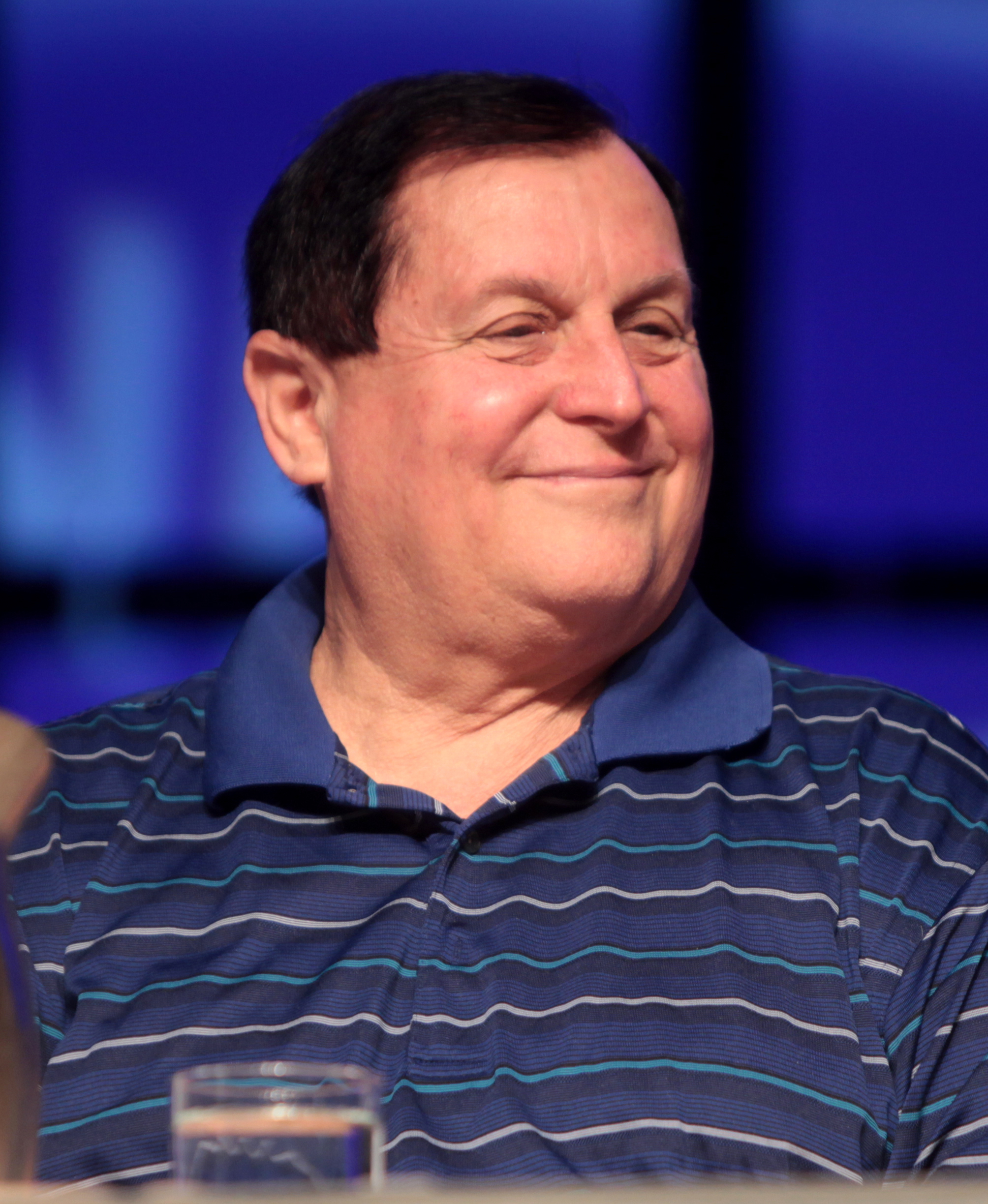
Burt Ward

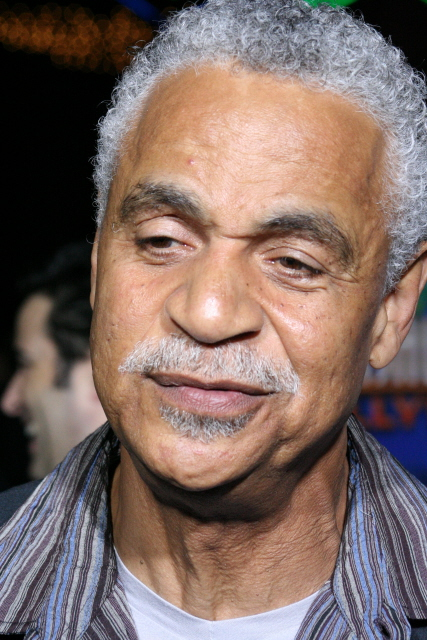
Ron Glass

- July 1
  - Mike Burstyn, American actor and singer
  - Debbie Harry, American singer (Blondie)
  - Billy Rohr, American Major League Baseball player
- July 2 – Linda Warren, American author
- July 6 – Burt Ward, American actor and activist (Batman)
- July 9 – Dean Koontz, American novelist
- July 10 – Ron Glass, African-American actor (Barney Miller) (d. 2016)
- July 11 – Richard Wesley, American playwright, screenwriter
- July 12
  - Edwin Neal, American actor
  - Larry Zierlein, American football coach
- July 13
  - Danny Abramowicz, American football player, coach
  - Robert H. Foglesong, U.S. General
- July 14 – Jim Gordon, American rock drummer (Derek and the Dominos) and convicted murderer (d. 2023)
- July 15 – Jan-Michael Vincent, American actor (d. 2019)
- July 18 – Boomer Castleman, American singer, songwriter (d. 2015)
- July 20
  - Kim Carnes, American singer, songwriter ("Bette Davis Eyes")
  - Larry Craig, American politician
- July 21 – Alton H. Maddox Jr., African-American lawyer (d. 2023)
- July 23 – Edie McClurg, comedian, screen and voice actress
- July 26 – Betty Davis, African-American funk and soul singer (d. 2022)
- July 28 – Jim Davis, American cartoonist (Garfield)
- July 30
  - Lloyd Carr, American football coach
  - Roger Dobkowitz, American game show producer
  - David Sanborn, American saxophonist (d. 2024)
- July 31 – William Weld, American politician

=== August ===
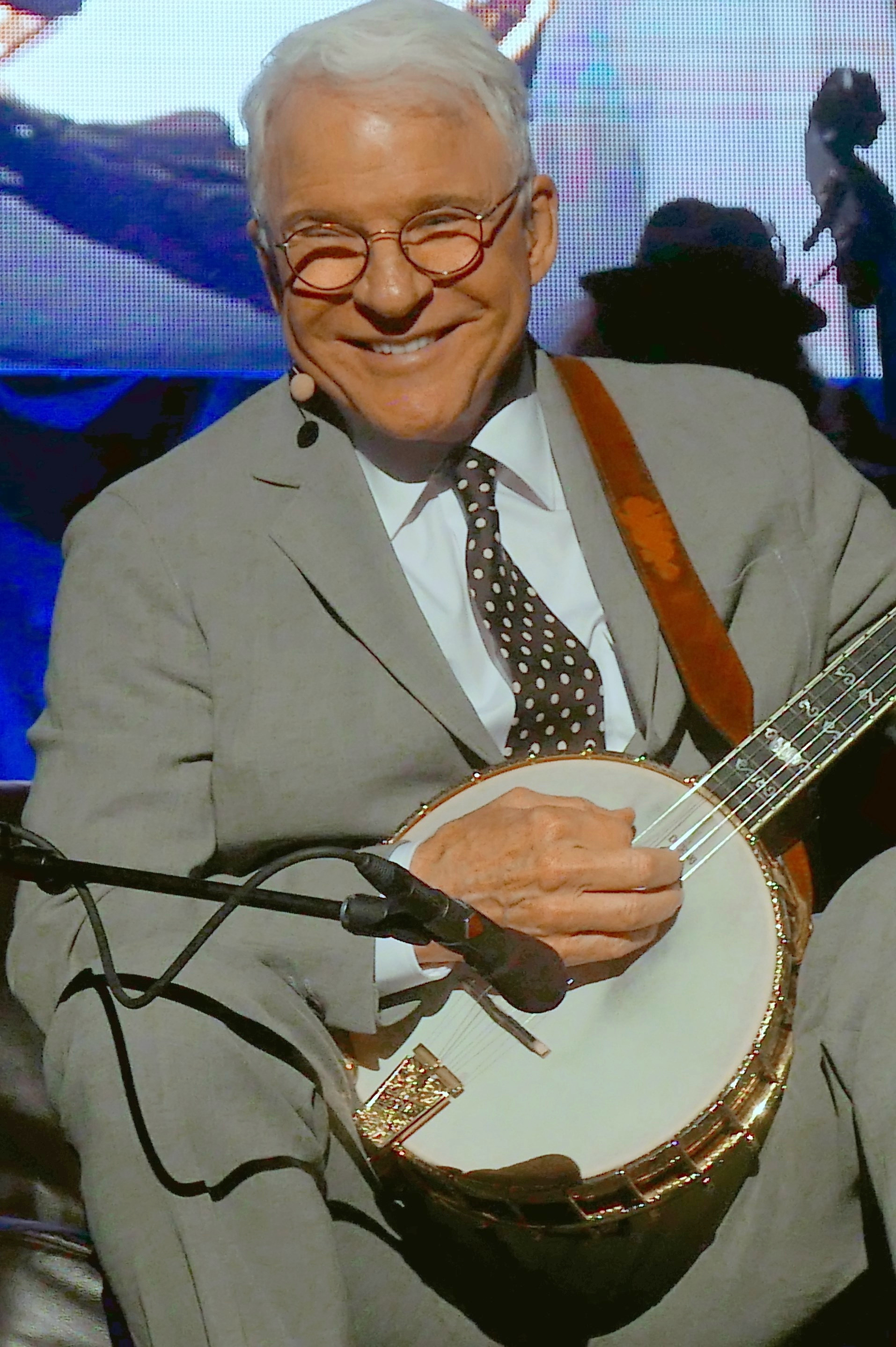
Steve Martin

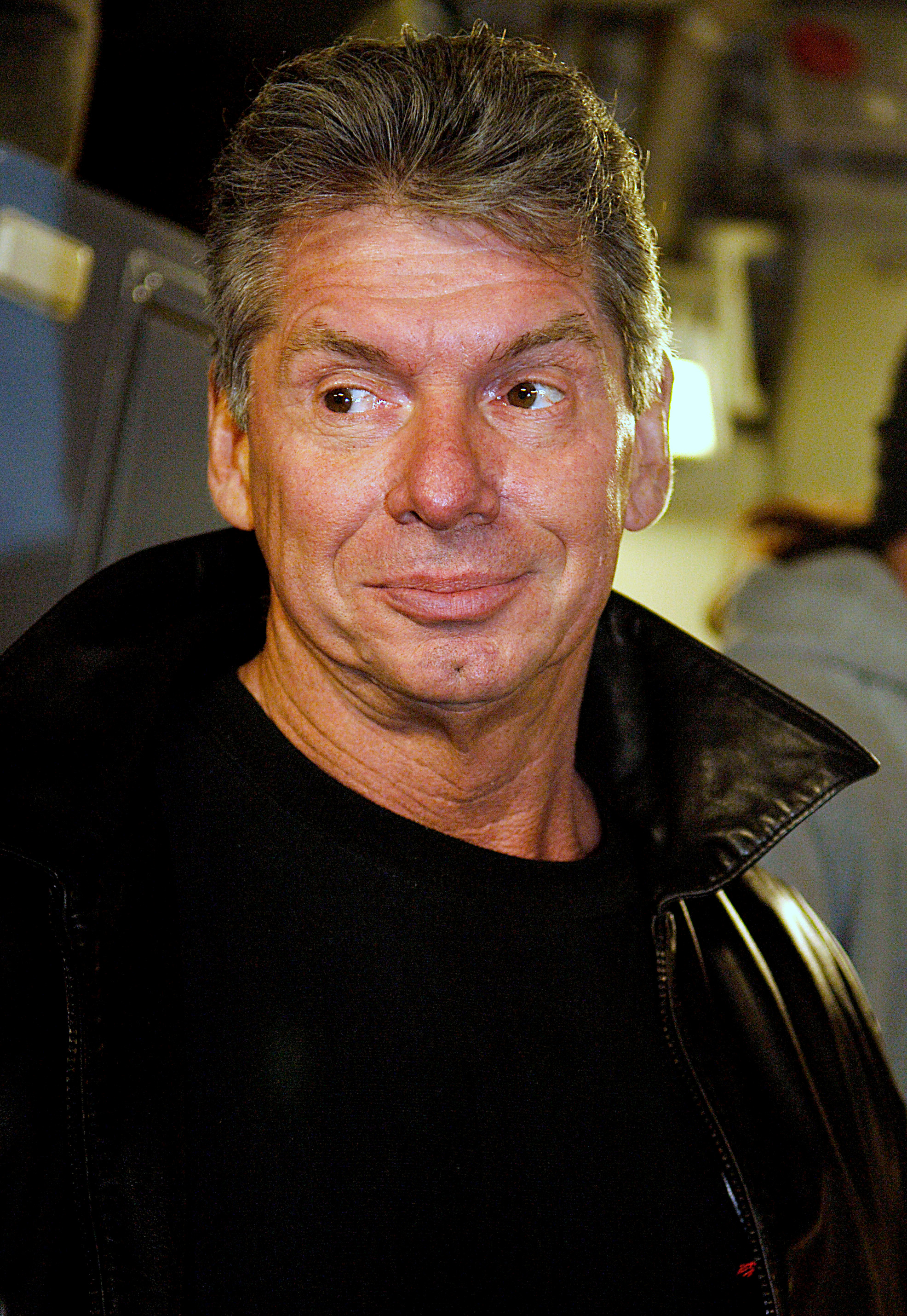
Vince McMahon

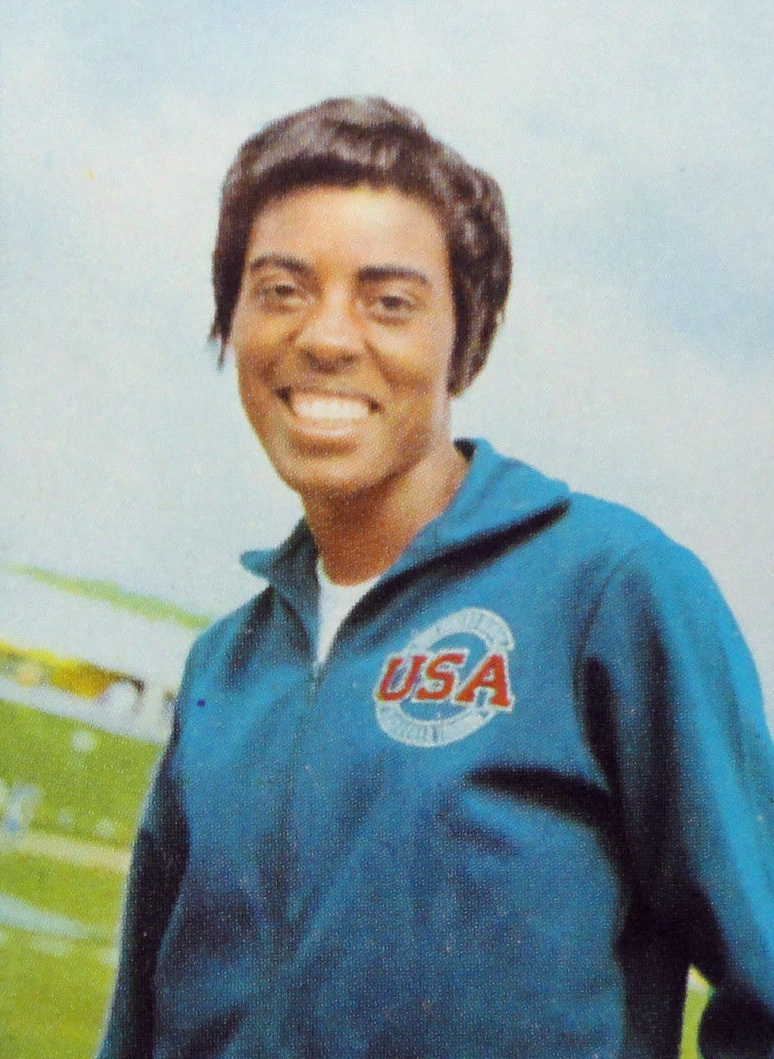
Wyomia Tyus

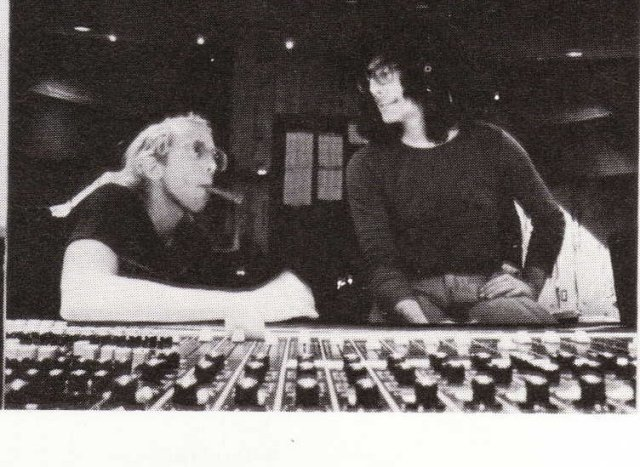
Bob Welch

- August 1 – Douglas Osheroff, American physicist, recipient of the Nobel Prize in Physics in 1996
- August 4 – Alan Mulally, American businessman, CEO of the Ford Motor Company
- August 5 – Loni Anderson, American actress (d. 2025)
- August 7 – Alan Page, American football player
- August 11 – Embeth Davidtz, American actress
- August 12 – J. D. McClatchy, American poet and literary critic (d. 2018)
- August 14 – Steve Martin, American actor, comedian
- August 15
  - Duffy Dyer, American baseball player and coach
  - Gene Upshaw, American football player (d. 2008)
- August 16 – Paul Morantz, American attorney and investigative journalist (d. 2022)
- August 20 – Jonathan Goodson, American television game show producer, son of Mark Goodson
- August 22
  - David Chase, American writer, director and television producer
  - Ron Dante, American rock singer, songwriter and record producer (The Archies)
  - Steve Kroft, American journalist, correspondent (60 Minutes)
- August 23 – Patti McGee, American skateboarder (d. 2024)
- August 24
  - Marsha P. Johnson, born Malcolm Michaels Jr., African-American gay liberation activist and drag queen (d. 1992)
  - Vince McMahon, American professional wrestling promoter, chairman and CEO of WWE
- August 26
  - Tom Ridge, American politician
  - Mel Watt, African-American politician and lawyer
- August 29 – Wyomia Tyus, American Olympic athlete
- August 31 – Bob Welch, American musician (d. 2012)

=== September ===
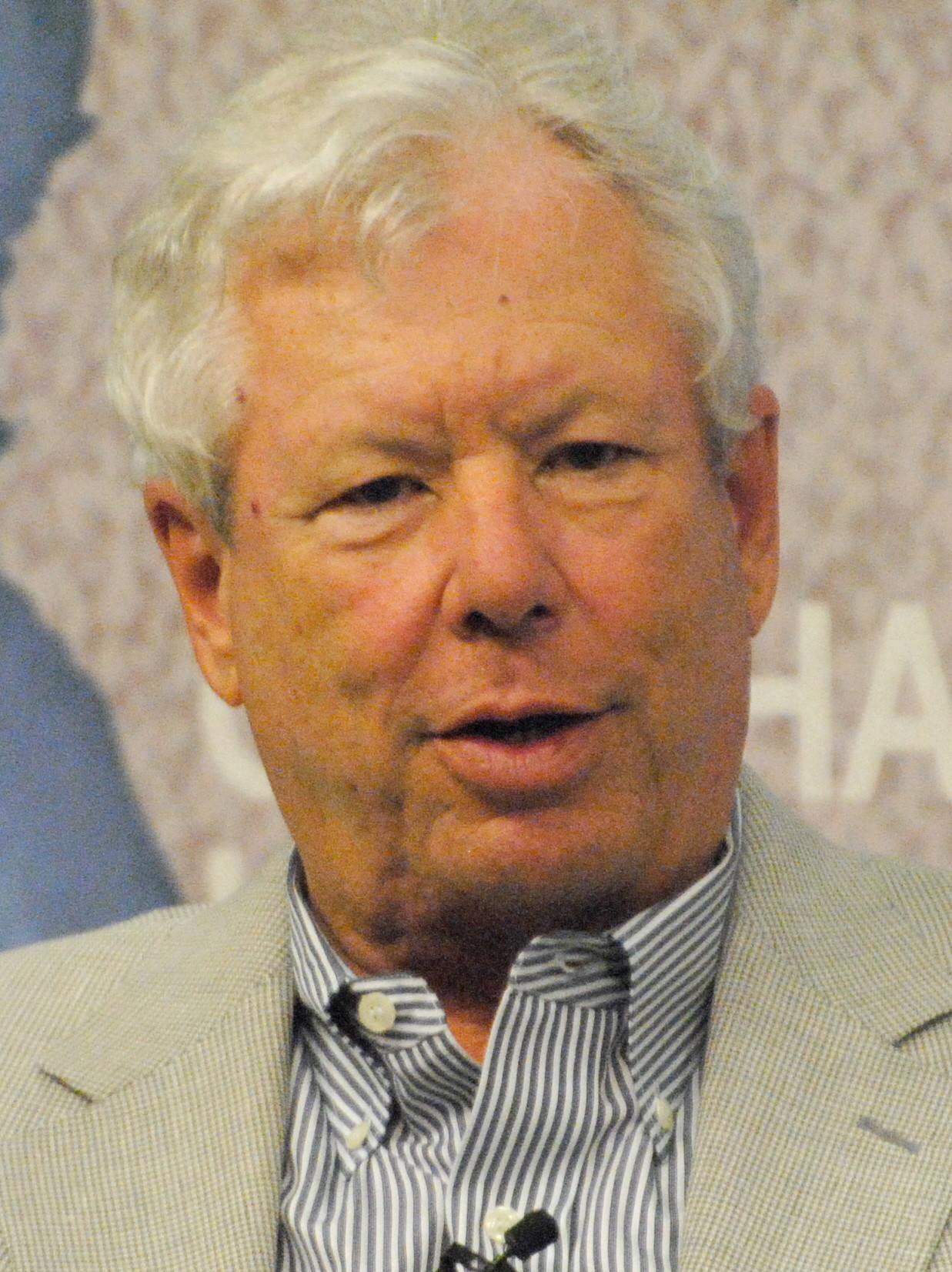
Richard Thaler

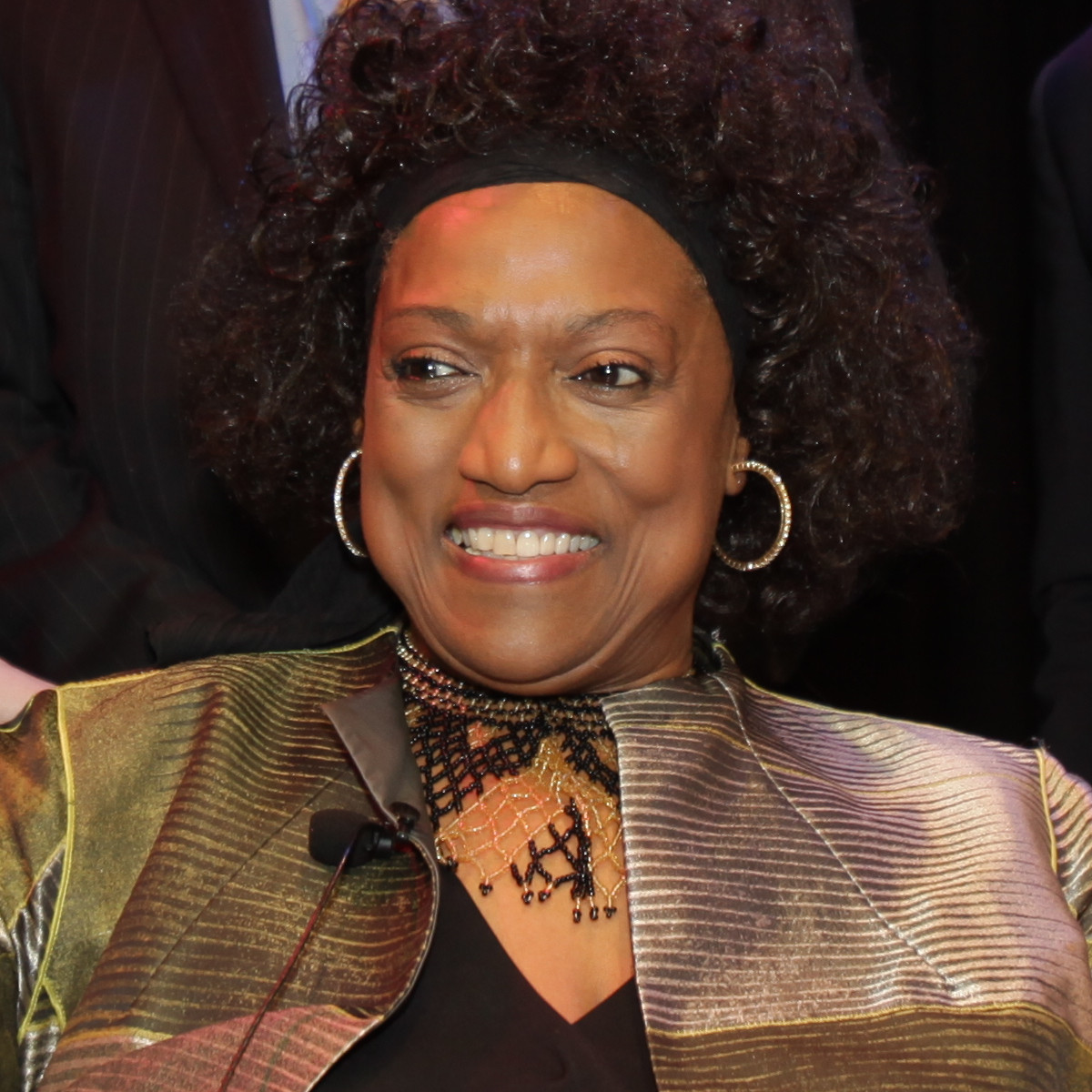
Jessye Norman

- September 4 – Danny Gatton, American guitarist (d. 1994)
- September 6 – Larry Lucchino, American lawyer and baseball executive (d. 2024)
- September 8 – Ron "Pigpen" McKernan, American musician (d. 1973)
- September 9 – Doug Ingle, American singer, songwriter (d. 2024)
- September 10 – Marlin Briscoe, American football player (d. 2022)
- September 12
  - Jim Liberman, American drag racer (d. 1977)
  - Richard Thaler, American economist, recipient of the Nobel Memorial Prize in Economic Sciences
- September 14 – Benjamin Harjo Jr., Native American artist
- September 15 – Jessye Norman, African-American operatic soprano (d. 2019)
- September 16 – Pat Stevens, voice actress (d. 2010)
- September 17 – Phil Jackson, basketball coach
- September 18 – P. F. Sloan, singer, songwriter (d. 2015)
- September 19 – Randolph Mantooth, actor, motivational speaker (Emergency!)
- September 20
  - Charlie Smithgall, American politician and businessman (d. 2022)
  - Candy Spelling, socialite, writer
  - Laurie Spiegel, electronic composer
- September 21 – Kay Ryan, poet
- September 23 – Paul Petersen, child actor, advocate for other child actors
- September 24 – Lou Dobbs, political commentator and television host (d. 2024)

=== October ===
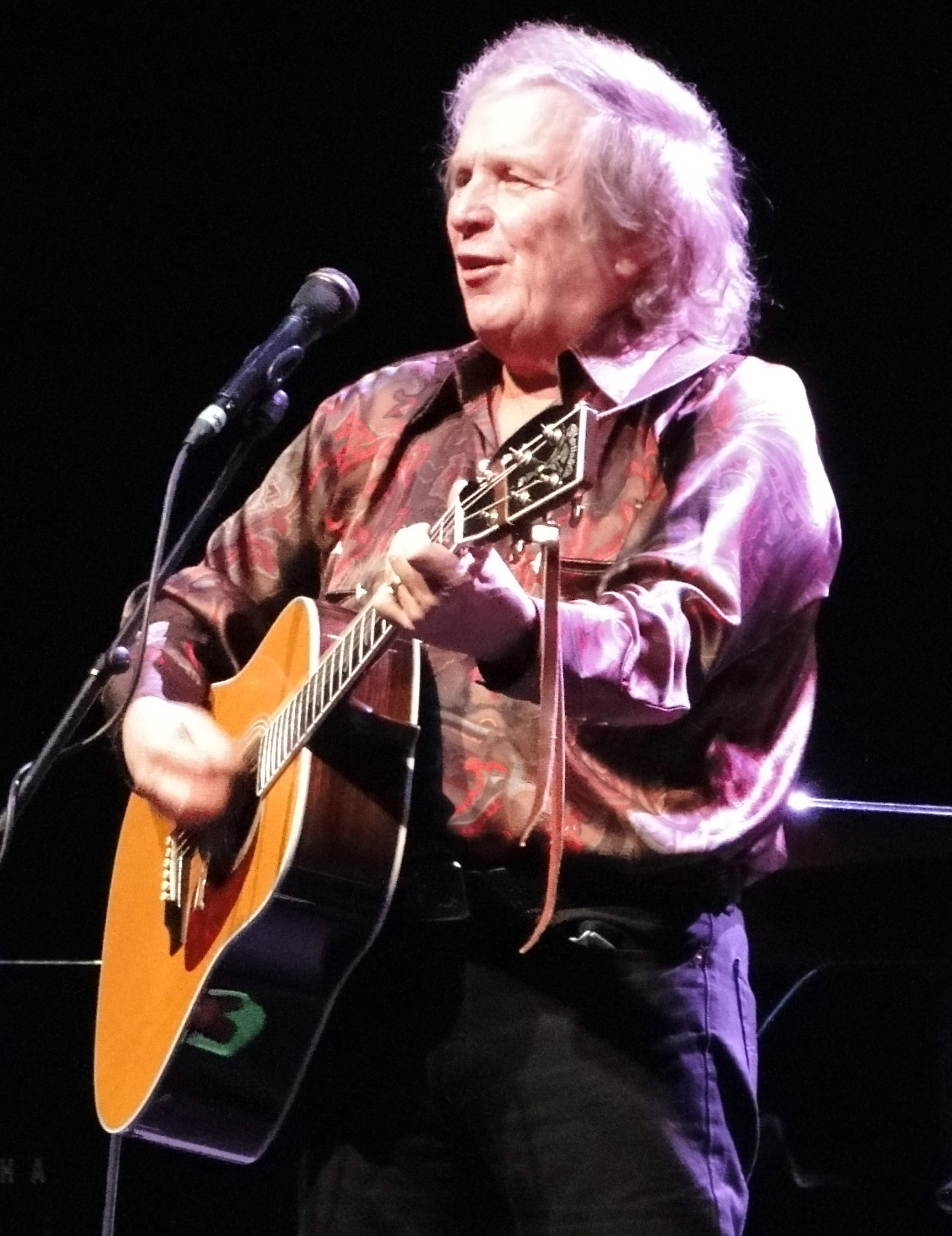
Don McLean

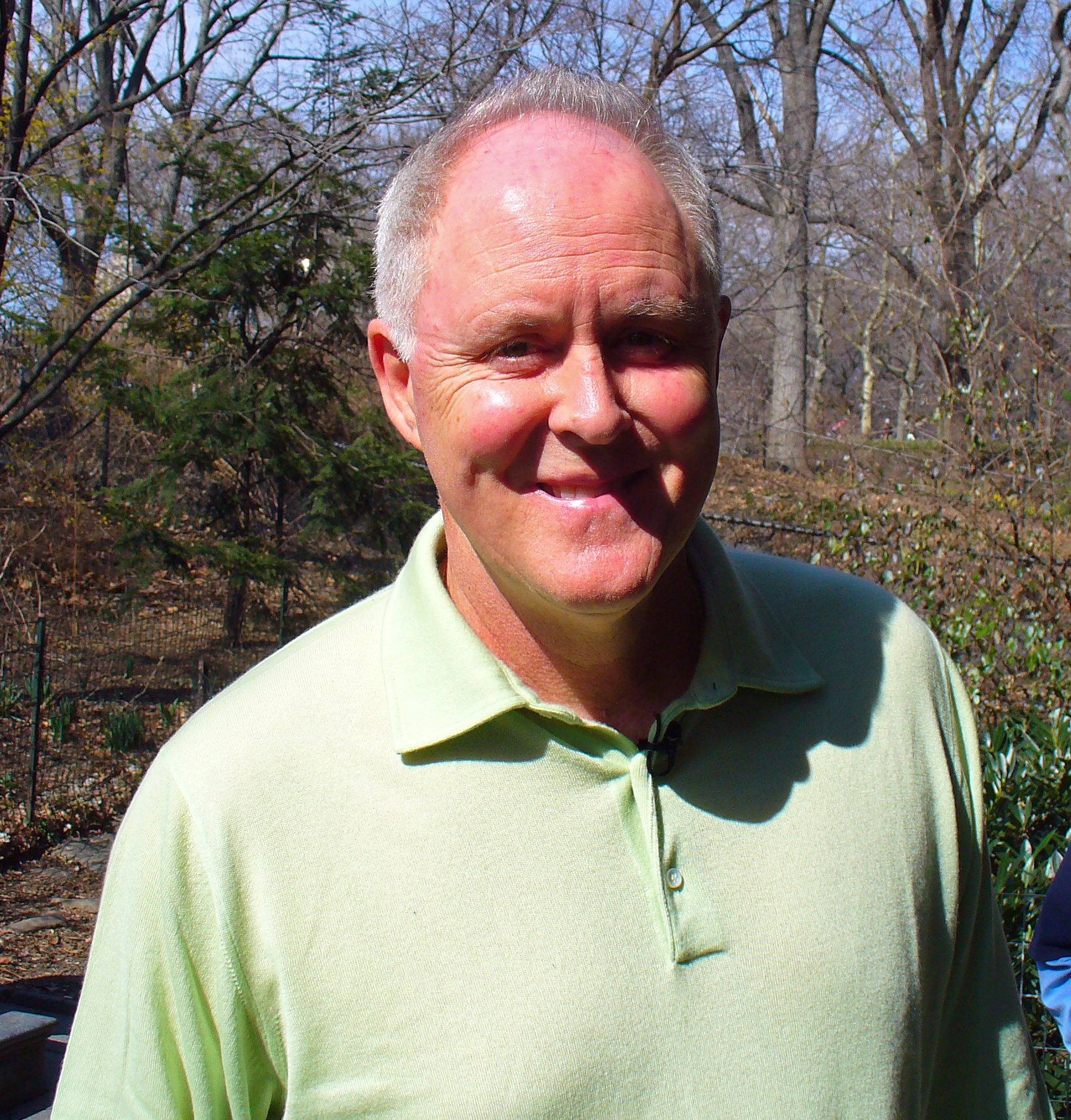
John Lithgow

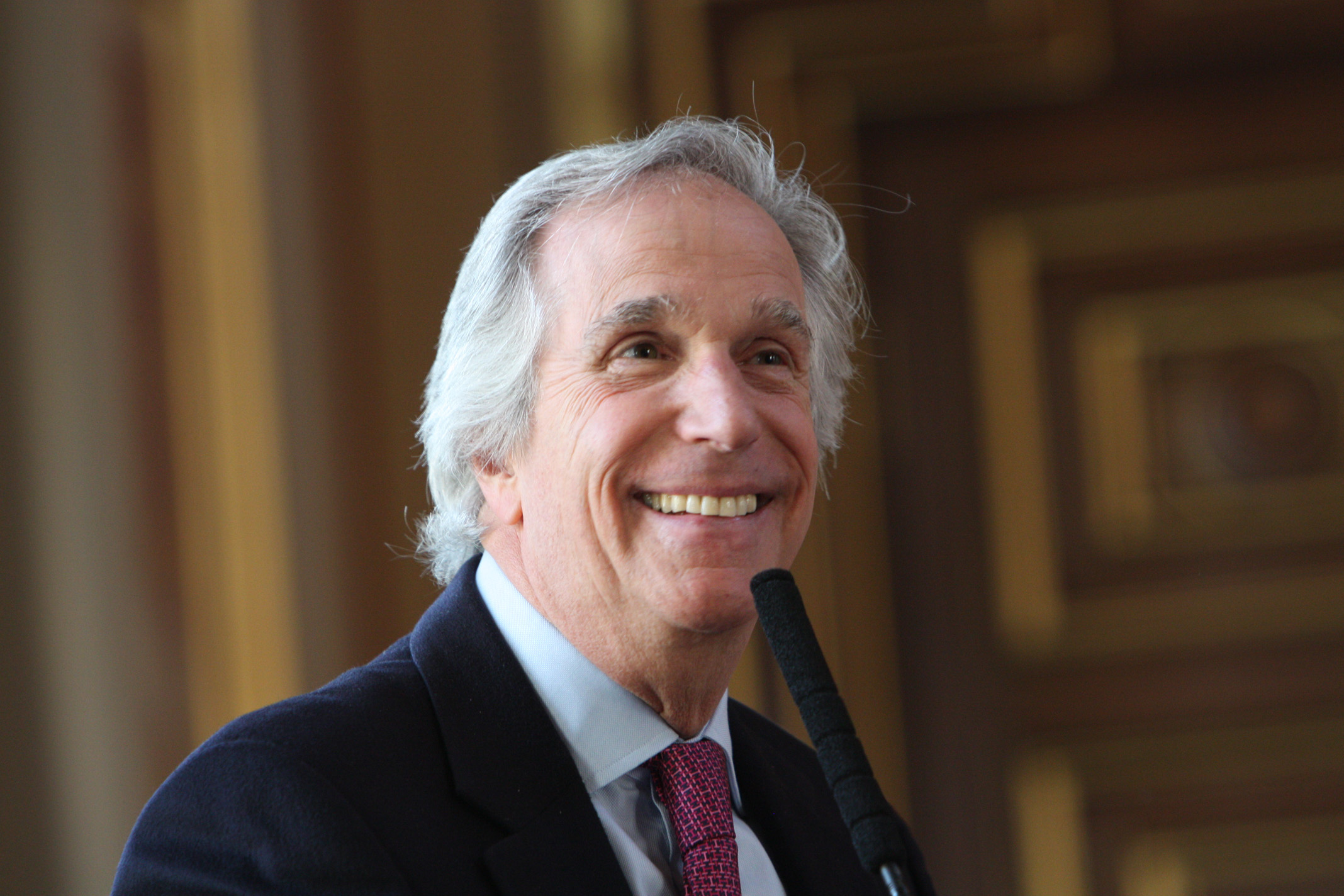
Henry Winkler

- October 1 – Donny Hathaway, African-American soul singer, songwriter (d. 1979)
- October 2 – Don McLean, American rock singer, songwriter ("American Pie")
- October 3 – Kay Baxter, American bodybuilder (d. 1988)
- October 4 – Clifton Davis, African-American actor, minister (Amen)
- October 11 – Dusty Rhodes, wrestler (d. 2015)
- October 13 – Susan Stafford, television presenter
- October 15 – Jim Palmer, baseball player
- October 18 – Huell Howser, television personality, host of California's Gold (d. 2013)
- October 19 – John Lithgow, actor (Third Rock from the Sun)
- October 20
  - Ron Franz, basketball player (d. 2022)
  - George Wyner, actor
- October 22
  - Buzz Potamkin, television producer (d. 2012)
  - Leslie West, singer and guitarist (d. 2020)
- October 24
  - Eugenie Scott, Executive Director of the National Center for Science Education
  - Sean Solomon, Principal Investigator of NASA's MESSENGER mission to Mercury
- October 25 – David Schramm, astrophysicist (d. 1997)
- October 26
  - Pat Conroy, author (d. 2016)
  - Jaclyn Smith, actress
- October 27 – Carrie Snodgress, actress (d. 2004)
- October 29
  - Melba Moore, African-American singer, actress (Hair)
  - Daniel Albright, literary critic and musicologist (died 2015)
- October 30
  - Ron Slinker, wrestler (d. 2008)
  - Henry Winkler, actor, director, producer and author
- October 31 – Brian Doyle-Murray, actor (Saturday Night Live)

=== November ===
Goldie Hawn

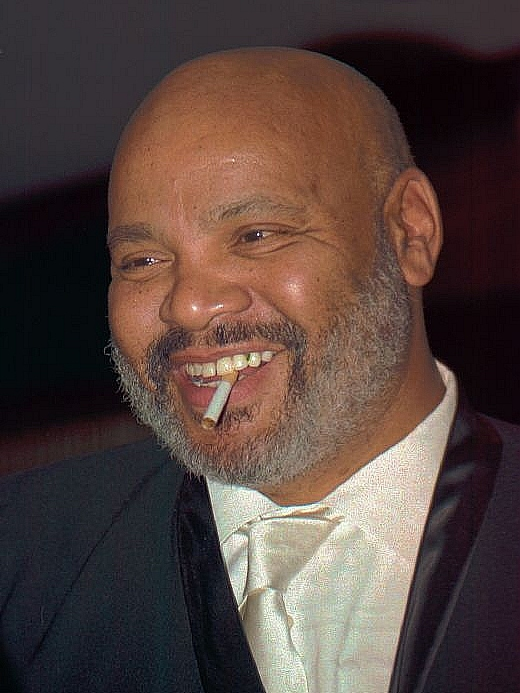
James Avery

- November 3 – Ken Holtzman, American baseball player and coach (d. 2024)
- November 7 – Bob Englehart, American editorial cartoonist
- November 8 – Joseph James DeAngelo, American serial killer and rapist
- November 9 – Charlie Robinson, American actor (Night Court) (d. 2021)
- November 12
  - Michael Bishop, American author (d. 2023)
  - Tracy Kidder, American journalist and author (d. 2026)
- November 21 – Goldie Hawn, American actress, producer and singer (Rowan and Martin's Laugh-In)
- November 22 – Robert Ben Rhoades, American serial killer, rapist known as "The Truck Stop Killer"
- November 23 – Jerry Harris, American sculptor
- November 25
  - Gail Collins, American journalist and author
  - Mary Jo Deschanel, American actress
- November 26 – Daniel Davis, American actor
- November 27
  - Barbara Anderson, American actress
  - James Avery, African-American actor (d. 2013)
- November 30
  - Linda Bove, American actress
  - Billy Drago, American actor (d. 2019)

=== December ===
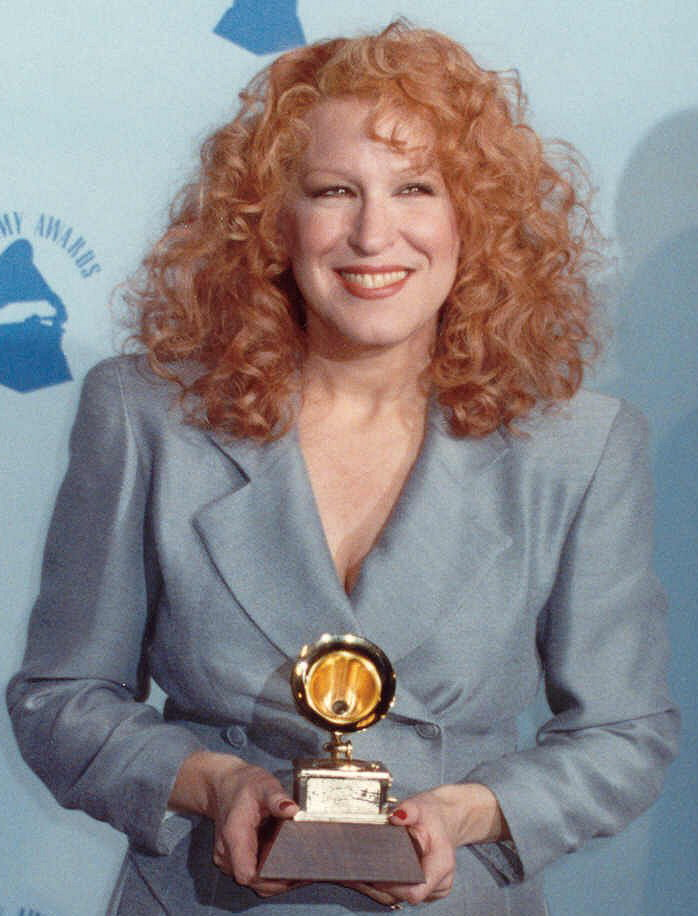
Bette Midler

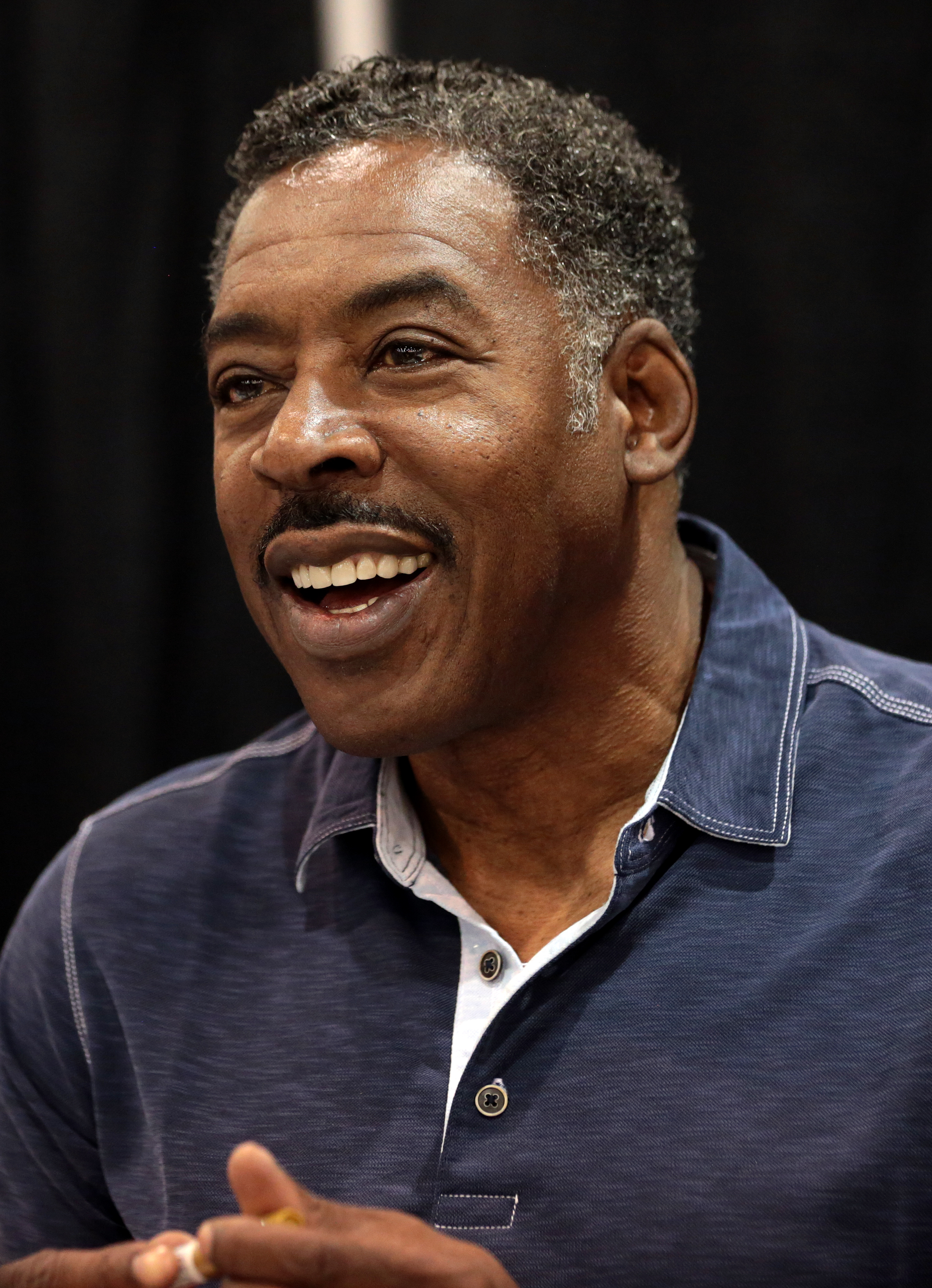
Ernie Hudson

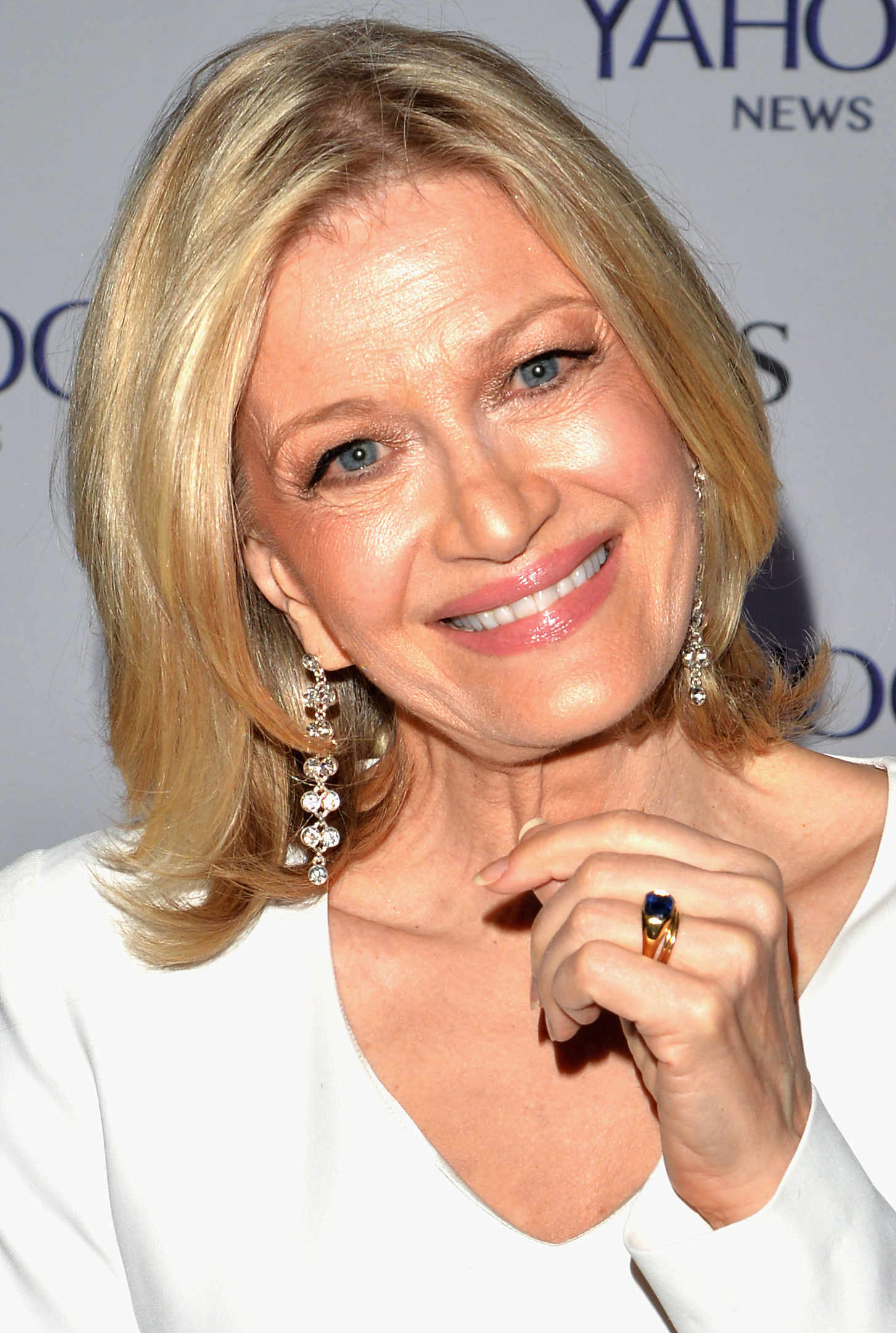
Diane Sawyer

- December 1 – Bette Midler, American actress and singer
- December 2 – Charles "Tex" Watson, American prisoner, 'Manson Family' member
- December 6
  - Larry Bowa, American baseball player and manager
  - Dan Harrington, lawyer and poker player
- December 9 – Michael Nouri, American actor
- December 13
  - Herman Cain, African-American conservative politician, author, business executive, radio host, syndicated columnist, and Tea Party activist (d. 2020)
  - Kathy Garver, actress, author and online radio hostess
  - Heather North, actress (d. 2017)
- December 16 – Patti Deutsch, voice actress (d. 2017)
- December 17
  - Ernie Hudson, African-American actor
  - Chris Matthews, news anchor
- December 18 – Carolyn Wood, professional swimmer
- December 19 – Elaine Joyce, actress, game show panelist
- December 20
  - Bruce Baker, geneticist (d. 2018)
  - Peter Criss, rock drummer (KISS)
- December 22
  - Diane Sawyer, news journalist
  - T. K. Wetherell, politician, educator (d. 2018)
- December 23 – Donald A. Ritchie, historian
- December 24 – Nicholas Meyer, screenwriter, producer, director and novelist
- December 25 – Gary Sandy, actor
- December 26 – John Walsh, media personality (America's Most Wanted)

=== Date unknown ===
- full date unknown – David M. Alexander, science fiction and mystery author

== Deaths ==
- January 3 – Edgar Cayce, mysticist (born 1877)
- January 6 – William Noble, missionary (born 1866)
- January 7
  - Alexander Stirling Calder, sculptor (born 1870)
  - Thomas McGuire, fighter ace (born 1920; killed in action)
- January 13 – Margaret Deland, novelist (born 1857)
- January 23 – Newton E. Mason, U.S. Navy rear admiral (born 1850)
- January 25 – Volga Hayworth, showgirl (born 1897)
- January 30 – Herbert L. Clarke, cornet virtuoso (born 1867)
- January 31 – Eddie Slovik, soldier (born 1920; executed for desertion)
- February 2
  - Joe Hunt, tennis player (born 1919; killed in naval aviation accident)
  - William E. Johnson, leader of the Anti-Saloon League (born 1862)
- February 11 – Al Dubin, songwriter (born 1891 in Switzerland)
- February 13 – John West Sinclair, silent film actor (born 1900)
- February 18 – Jimmy Butler, actor (killed in action) (born 1921)
- February 19 – John Basilone, Medal of Honour recipient (killed in action) (born 1916)
- February 22 – Sara Josephine Baker, physician (born 1873)
- February 23 – Reginald Barker, film director (born 1886)
- February 26
  - James Roy Andersen, general (killed in action) (born 1904)
  - Millard Harmon, general (lost on active service) (born 1888)
- March 1 – U.S. Marine flag raisers on Iwo Jima (killed in action in Battle of Iwo Jima)
    - Harlon Block (born 1924)
    - Henry Oliver Hansen (born 1919)
    - Michael Strank (born 1919)
- March 3 – Bessie Alexander Ficklen, doggerel poet and hand puppet specialist (born 1861)
- March 4
  - Lucille La Verne, actress (born 1872)
  - Mark Sandrich, film director (born 1900)
- March 5 – Lena Baker, African American maid executed for capital murder, pardoned posthumously (born 1900)
- March 8 – Jack Lummus, athlete and Medal of Honor recipient (killed in action) (born 1915)
- March 21 – Franklin Sousley, U.S. Marine flag raiser on Iwo Jima (killed in Battle of Iwo Jima) (born 1925)
- March 22 – John Hessin Clarke, Supreme Court Justice (born 1857)
- March 30 – Maurice Rose, U.S. Army general (born 1899; killed in action)
- March 31 – Harriet Boyd Hawes, archaeologist (born 1871)
- April 10 – Gloria Dickson, actress (born 1917; killed in domestic fire)
- April 12 – Franklin D. Roosevelt, 32nd president of the United States from 1933 to 1945 (born 1882)
- April 17 – Ernie Pyle, journalist (born 1900)
- April 29 – Malcolm McGregor, silent film actor (born 1892)
- April 30 – William Orlando Darby, U.S. Army colonel, creator of the Rangers (born 1911; killed in action)
- May 5 – George Cary, architect (born 1859).
- May 14 – Heber J. Grant, 7th president of the Church of Jesus Christ of Latter-day Saints (born 1856)
- May 17 – Bobby Hutchins, Our Gang films child actor (born 1925; killed in military aviation accident)
- May 18 – William Joseph Simmons, founder of the second Ku Klux Klan (born 1880)
- May 21
  - Horace B. Carpenter, actor (b. 1875)
  - Frank Cable, naval architect (b. 1863)
- June 16 – Henry Bellamann, author (born 1882)
- June 18 – Simon Bolivar Buckner, Jr., U.S. Army general (born 1886; killed in action at Battle of Okinawa)
- June 20 – Bruno Frank, German author, poet, dramatist and humanist (born 1887)
- July 13 – Alla Nazimova, scriptwriter and actress (born 1879 in Crimea)
- July 16 – Addison Randall, Western film actor (born 1906)
- July 19 – George Barbier, actor (born 1864)
- July 25 – Charles Gilman Norris, novelist (born 1881)
- August 9 – Harry Hillman, track athlete (born 1881)
- August 10 – Robert H. Goddard, rocket scientist (born 1882)
- August 25 – Willis Augustus Lee, U.S. Navy admiral and Olympic shooter (born 1888; heart attack on active service)
- September 1 – Frank Craven, actor (born 1881)
- September 6 – John S. McCain Sr., U.S. Navy admiral (born 1884; heart attack on active service)
- September 15 – Harry Daghlian, physicist (born 1921)
- September 18 – Blind Willie Johnson, African American gospel singer and guitarist (born 1897; pneumonia)
- September 20 – Jack Thayer, survivor of the sinking of the RMS Titanic (born 1894)
- September 26 – A. Peter Dewey, soldier, first American casualty in Vietnam (born 1916)
- October 1
  - Walter Bradford Cannon, physiologist (born 1871)
  - George Van Haltren, baseball player (born 1866)
- October 13 – Milton S. Hershey, chocolate tycoon (born 1857)
- October 24 – Charles D. Barney, stockbroker (born 1844)
- October 28 – Gilbert Emery, film actor and author (born 1875)
- November 7 – Gus Edwards, songwriter (born 1878 in Germany)
- November 11 – Jerome Kern, popular composer (born 1885)
- November 21
  - Robert Benchley, humorist, theater critic and actor (born 1889)
  - Ellen Glasgow, novelist (born 1873)
  - Alexander Patch, U.S. Army general (born 1889; pneumonia on active service)
- November 23 – Charles Armijo Woodruff, U.S. Navy officer and 11th Governor of American Samoa from 1914 to 1915 (born 1884; suicide)
- November 25 – Doris Keane, stage actress (born 1881)
- November 26 – John Jenkins, auto racer (born 1875)
- November 28 – Dwight F. Davis, tennis player (born 1879)
- December 4 – Thomas Hunt Morgan, biologist, geneticist and embryologist, recipient of the Nobel Prize in Physiology or Medicine in 1933 (born 1866)
- December 21 – George S. Patton, U.S. Army general (born 1885; died as result of auto accident in Germany)
- December 25 – Russell Gleason, actor (born 1907)
- December 28 – Theodore Dreiser, novelist (born 1871)

== See also ==
- List of American films of 1945
- Timeline of United States history (1930–1949)
- Timeline of World War II
