= Galleries Maurice Sternberg =

Art gallery in Chicago, Illinois, US

- Established: 1945
- Location: 3000 North Sheridan Road, Chicago, Illinois 60657; United States
- Coordinates: 41.9369°N 87.6397°W
- Directors: Harvey Pool, Susan Pool
- Website: https://www.galleriesmauricesternberg.com

Galleries Maurice Sternberg is Chicago's oldest continually operating art gallery, founded in 1945.

The gallery was founded by Maurice Sternberg and Judith Sternberg in the arcade of the Drake Hotel. In its early days, the gallery became known for exhibiting the work of American and European artists including Antoine Blanchard, Edouard Cortes, and Alexander Calder.

Maurice Sternberg died in 1994 and the gallery passed to his wife, Judith who directed the gallery until 1999. The gallery was sold to Harvey Pool and Susan Pool, former Los Angeles marketing executives. Under the gallery's new directors, the location was moved from its original location in the Drake Hotel to the John Hancock Center. In the 21st century, the gallery has represented works by and mounted exhibitions for many leading American and European artists contemporary artists including, Niels Strøbek and Ian Hornak. The gallery has continued to represent artwork by many of the artists that were originally sold through the company and has introduced additional historic artists to its stable including Karel Appel, Oscar Bluemner, Bernard Buffet, Charles Burchfield, Sam Francis, Robert Indiana, Joan Miró, Henry Moore, Claes Oldenburg and Andy Warhol, among others.

In 2011, the gallery relocated to 3000 North Sheridan Road in Chicago.
