= Niels Strøbek =

Danish painter and graphic artist

- Born: October 14, 1944 (age 81); Denmark
- Education: Royal Danish Academy of Fine Arts

Niels Strøbek (born October 14, 1944) is a painter and graphic artist, primarily known for his super-realist paintings and portraits.

Niels Strøbek received his education from the Royal Danish Academy of Fine Arts which he attended from 1962 to 1967, studying under spontaneous-abstract painter Professor Egill Jacobsen.

Strøbek is considered one of the leading artists within the Danish super-realist art movement. The super-realist art movement had its breakthrough in Danish art in the early 1970s and was influenced by American photo-realism. However, Strøbek had already begun to paint realistically in 1965, and his detailed realism was rooted in European art, i.e. the Italian Renaissance, Spanish Baroque, or the Danish Golden Age, rather than in the photograph. Strøbek's technique is impeccable. His paintings are executed with a precision that makes them look like photographs.

Strøbek's motifs are still lifes, landscapes, portraits and human figures. He has executed many portraits, notably three commissioned by the Danish queen Margrethe II. Often Strøbek uses the trompe-l'œil technique in his paintings combining his modern approach and motif view with a style mostly associated with the Baroque period.

Strøbek has exhibited extensively both in Denmark and internationally.
