= Flight 19 =

US Navy training flight lost in 1945

Disappearance of Flight 19
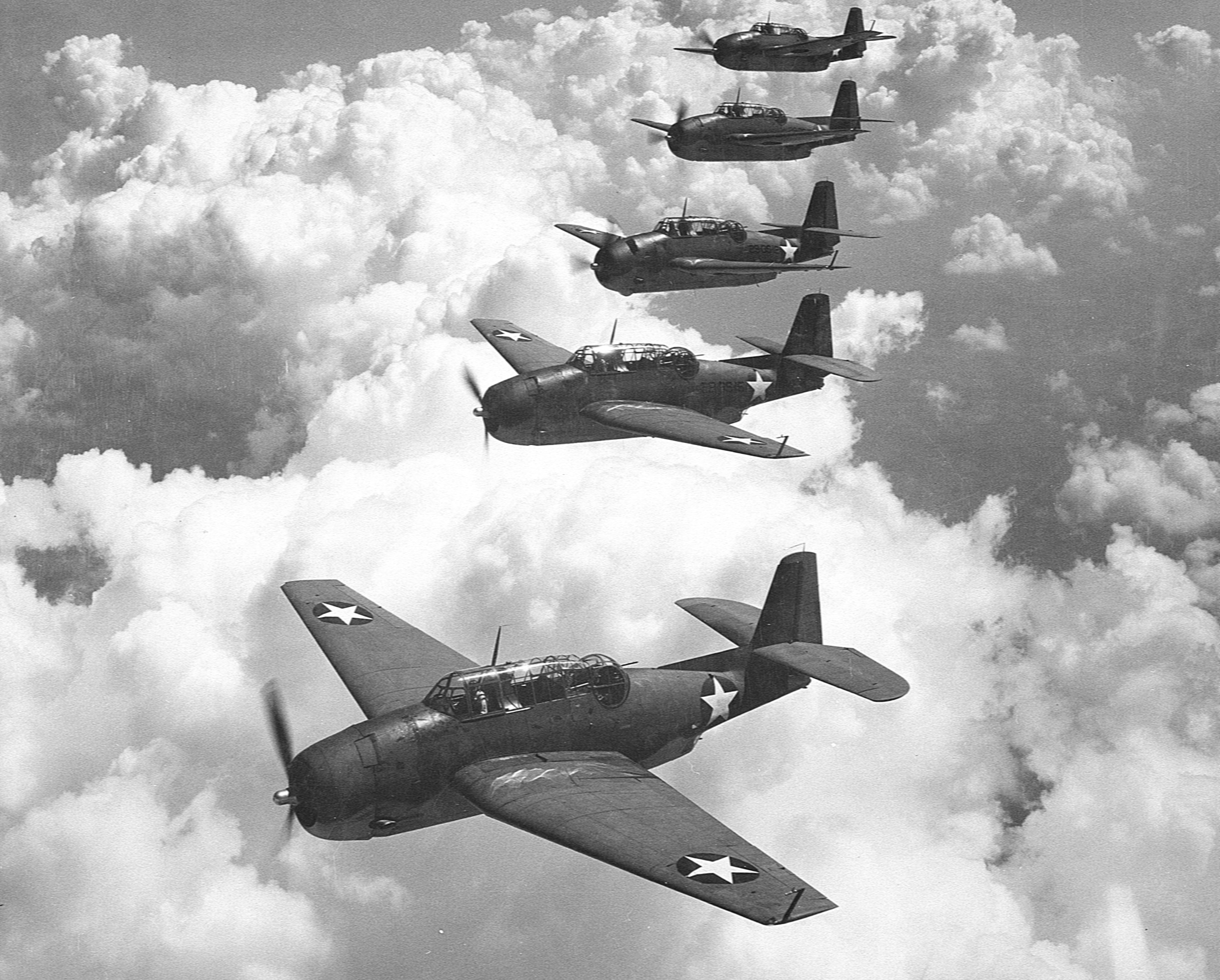
- A similar flight of five 'Avenger' aircraft

Occurrence
- Date: December 5, 1945
- Summary: Disappearance
- Site: Atlantic Ocean

Aircraft
- Aircraft type: GM-built TBM Avenger
- Operator: United States Navy
- Flight origin: NAS Fort Lauderdale
- Destination: NAS Fort Lauderdale
- Crew: 14
- Fatalities: 14
- Missing: 14
- Survivors: 0

Flight 19 was the designation of a group of five Grumman TBF Avenger torpedo bombers that disappeared over the Bermuda Triangle on December 5, 1945, after losing contact during a United States Navy overwater navigation training flight from Naval Air Station Fort Lauderdale, Florida. All 14 naval aviators on the flight were lost, as were all 13 crew members of a Martin PBM Mariner that subsequently launched from Naval Air Station Banana River to search for Flight 19.

A report by Navy investigators concluded that flight leader Lt. Charles C. Taylor mistook small islands offshore for the Florida Keys after his compasses stopped working, resulting in the flight heading over open sea and away from land. The report was later amended by the Navy to read "cause unknown" to avoid blaming Taylor for the loss of five aircraft and 14 men. The report attributed the loss of the PBM aircraft to an explosion in mid-air while searching for Flight 19.

== Navigation training flight ==
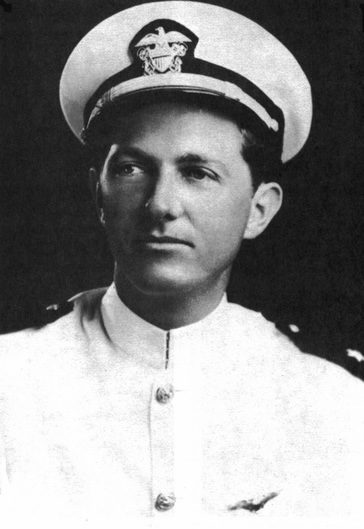
Lieutenant Charles Carroll Taylor, USNR, flight leader of Flight 19

Flight 19 undertook a routine navigation and combat training exercise in TBM-type aircraft. The assignment was called "Navigation problem No. 1", a combination of bombing and navigation that other flights had completed or were scheduled to undertake that day. The flight leader, Lieutenant Charles Carroll Taylor, had about 2,500 flying hours, mostly in aircraft of this type, while his trainee pilots each had 300 total and 60 flight hours in the Avenger. Taylor had completed a combat tour in the Pacific theater as a torpedo bomber pilot on the aircraft carrier USS Hancock and had recently arrived from NAS Miami where he had also been a VTB (torpedo-bombing plane) instructor. The student pilots had recently completed other training missions in the area where the flight was to take place. They were U.S. Marine Captains Edward Joseph Powers and George William Stivers, U.S. Marine Second Lieutenant Forrest James Gerber and USN Ensign Joseph Tipton Bossi.

The aircraft were three TBM-1Cs (BuNo 45714, 'FT3'; BuNo 46325, 'FT81'; BuNo 73209, 'FT117'), one TBM-1E (BuNo 46094, 'FT36'); and one TBM-3 (BuNo 23307, 'FT28'). Each aircraft was a version of the Grumman TBF Avenger, built by General Motors' Eastern Aircraft Division under wartime production license. Under the U.S. Navy aircraft designation system used during World War II, Grumman-built Avengers were designated TBF and GM-built aircraft such as these were designated TBM. Each was fully fueled, and during pre-flight checks, it was discovered they were all missing clocks. Navigation of the route was intended to teach dead reckoning principles, which involved calculating, among other things, elapsed time. The apparent lack of timekeeping equipment was not a cause for concern, as it was assumed each man had his own watch. Takeoff was scheduled for 13:45 local time, but the late arrival of Taylor delayed departure until 14:10. The weather at NAS Fort Lauderdale was described as "favorable, sea state moderate to rough".

The exercise involved three legs, with the flight having flown four, the fourth being returning to NAS Ft. Lauderdale after reaching the Florida coast. After take off, they flew on heading 091° (almost due east) for 56 nmi (64 mi; 104 km) until reaching Hens and Chickens Shoals, commonly called Chicken Rocks, where low level bombing practice was carried out. The flight was to continue on that heading for another 67 nmi (77 mi; 124 km) before turning onto a course of 346° for 73 nmi (84 mi; 135 km), in the process over-flying Grand Bahama island. The next scheduled turn was to a heading of 241° to fly 120 nmi (140 mi; 220 km) at the end of which the exercise was completed, and the Avengers would turn left to then return to NAS Ft. Lauderdale.

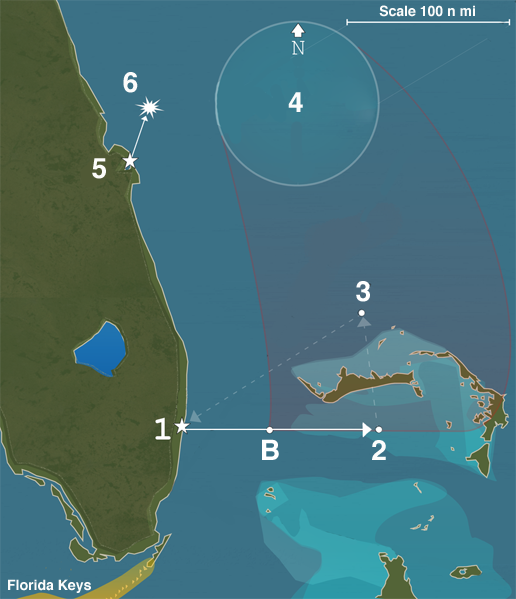
Flight 19's scheduled navigation exercise was on December 5, 1945.: 1. Leave NAS Fort Lauderdale 14:10 on heading 091° for 56 nautical miles (104 km), drop bombs at Hens and Chickens shoals (B) until about 15:00 then continue on heading 091° for 67 nautical miles (124 km); 2. Turn left to heading 346° and fly 73 nautical miles (135 km).; 3. Turn left to heading 241° for 120 nautical miles (222 km) to end exercise north of NAS Fort Lauderdale.; 4. 17:50 radio triangulation establishes the flight's position to within 50 nautical miles (93 km) of 29°N 79°W and their last reported course, 270°.; 5. PBM Mariner leaves NAS Banana River 19:27.; 6. 19:50 Mariner explodes near 28°N 80°W.

Radio conversations between the pilots were overheard by the base and other aircraft in the area. The practice bombing operation is known to have been carried out because, at about 15:00, a pilot requested and was given permission to drop his last bomb. Forty minutes later, another flight instructor, Lieutenant Robert F. Cox in FT-74, who was forming up with his group of students for the same mission, received an unidentified transmission.

An unidentified crew member asked Powers, one of the students, for his compass reading. Powers replied: "I don't know where we are. We must have got lost after that last turn." Cox then transmitted; "This is FT-74, plane or boat calling 'Powers' please identify yourself so someone can help you." The response after a few moments was a request from the others in the flight for suggestions. FT-74 tried again and a man identified as FT-28 (Taylor) came on. "FT-28, this is FT-74, what is your trouble?" "Both of my compasses are out", Taylor replied, "and I am trying to find Fort Lauderdale, Florida. I am over land but it's broken. I am sure I'm in the Keys but I don't know how far down and I don't know how to get to Fort Lauderdale." FT-74 informed the NAS that aircraft were lost, then advised Taylor to put the sun on his port wing and fly north up the coast to Fort Lauderdale. Base operations then asked if the flight leader's aircraft was equipped with a standard YG (IFF transmitter), which could be used to triangulate the flight's position, but the message was not acknowledged by FT-28. (Later he would indicate that his transmitter was activated.) Instead, at 16:45, FT-28 radioed: "We are heading 030 degrees for 45 minutes, then we will fly north to make sure we are not over the Gulf of Mexico." During this time no bearings could be made on the flight, and IFF could not be picked up. Taylor was told to broadcast on 4805 kHz. This order was not acknowledged so he was asked to switch to 3000 kHz, the search and rescue frequency. Taylor replied – "I cannot switch frequencies. I must keep my planes intact."

At 16:56, Taylor was again asked to turn on his transmitter for YG if he had one. He did not acknowledge but, a few minutes later, advised his flight "Change course to 090 degrees (due east) for 10 minutes." About the same time, someone in the flight said, "Dammit, if we could just fly west we would get home; head west, dammit." This difference of opinion later led to questions about why the students did not simply head west on their own. It has been explained that this can be attributed to military discipline. As the weather deteriorated, radio contact became intermittent, and it was believed that the five aircraft by this point were more than 200 nmi (230 mi; 370 km) out to sea, east of the Florida peninsula. Taylor radioed "We'll fly 270 degrees west until landfall or running out of gas" and requested a weather check at 17:24. By 17:50, several land-based radio stations had triangulated Flight 19's position as being within a 100 nmi (120 mi; 190 km) radius of 29°N 79°W; Flight 19 was north of the Bahamas and well off the coast of central Florida.

At 18:04, Taylor radioed to his flight "Holding 270. We didn't fly far enough east; we may as well just turn around and fly east again". By that time, the weather had deteriorated even more and the sun had set. Around 18:20, Taylor's last message was received. (It has also been reported that Taylor's last message was received at 19:04.) He was heard saying, "All planes close up tight ... we'll have to ditch unless landfall ... when the first plane drops below 10 gallons [38 liters], we all go down together."

== PBM-5 (Bureau Number 59225) ==
PBM-5 Mariner
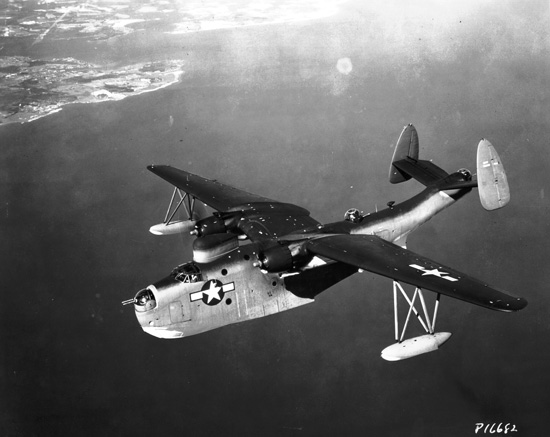
- A Martin PBM-5 Mariner similar to BuNo 59225.

Occurrence
- Date: December 5, 1945
- Summary: Disappearance, Presumed mid-air explosion
- Site: 28.59°N 80.25°W

Aircraft
- Aircraft type: Martin PBM-5 Mariner
- Operator: United States Navy
- Flight origin: NAS Banana River
- Destination: NAS Banana River
- Crew: 13
- Fatalities: 13
- Survivors: 0

As it became obvious the flight was lost, air bases, aircraft, and merchant ships were alerted. A Consolidated PBY Catalina departed after 18:00 to search for Flight 19 and guide them back if they could be located. After dark, two Martin PBM Mariner flying boats originally scheduled for their own training flights were diverted to perform square pattern searches in the area west of 29°N 79°W. US Navy Squadron Training No. 49 PBM-5 BuNo 59225 took off at 19:27 from Naval Air Station Banana River, called in a routine radio message at 19:30 and was never heard from again.

At 21:15, the tanker SS Gaines Mills reported it had observed flames from an apparent explosion leaping 100 ft (30 m) high and burning for 10 minutes, at position 28.59°N 80.25°W. Captain Shonna Stanley reported unsuccessfully searching for survivors through a pool of oil and aviation gasoline. The escort carrier USS Solomons also reported losing radar contact with an aircraft at the same position and time.

The PBM could hold 9.83 tonnes of aviation gasoline. Its flexible fuel lines had a noted tendency to get loose in rough conditions, and leak gasoline. The most likely conclusion is that the PBM had a mid-air explosion.

== Investigation ==
A 500-page Navy board of investigation report published a few months later made several observations:

- Flight leader Lt. Charles C. Taylor had mistakenly believed that the small islands he passed over were the Florida Keys, that his flight was over the Gulf of Mexico, and that heading northeast would take them to Florida. It was determined that Taylor had passed over the Bahamas as scheduled, and he did, in fact, lead his flight to the northeast over the Atlantic. The report noted that some subordinate officers did likely know their approximate position, as indicated by radio transmissions stating that flying west would result in reaching the mainland.
- As noted in the report, Taylor refused to change the radio training frequency to the search and rescue radio frequency. (The training frequency was difficult to use because of interference from Cuban radio stations and also a radio carrier wave.)
- Taylor was not at fault because the compasses stopped working.
- The loss of PBM-5 BuNo 59225 was attributed to an explosion.

This report was subsequently amended "cause unknown" by the Navy after Taylor's mother contended that the Navy was unfairly blaming her son for the loss of 5 aircraft and 14 men, when the Navy had neither the bodies nor the airplanes as evidence.

Had Flight 19 actually been where Taylor believed it to be, the flight would have made landfall with the Florida coastline within 20 minutes, depending on how far down they were. However, a later reconstruction of the incident showed that the islands visible to Taylor were probably the Bahamas, well northeast of the Keys, and that Flight 19 was exactly where it should have been. The board of investigation found that because of his belief that he was on a base course toward Florida, Taylor actually guided the flight farther northeast and out to sea. Further, it was general knowledge at NAS Fort Lauderdale that, if a pilot ever became lost in the area, to fly a heading of 270° (due west). Likewise, a rule of thumb was that any pilot who got lost going south would simply turn his plane around with the sun on his port side [left] and then follow the Florida coast heading north. By the time the flight actually turned west, they were likely so far out to sea that they had already passed their aircraft's fuel endurance. This factor, combined with bad weather and the ditching characteristics of the Avenger, meant that there was little hope of rescue, even if they had managed to stay afloat.

It is possible that Taylor overshot Gorda Cay and instead reached another land mass in the southern Abaco Islands. He then proceeded northwest as planned, where he fully expected to find the Grand Bahama Island lying in front of him. Instead, he eventually saw a land mass to his right side, the northern part of Abaco Island. Believing that this landmass to his right was Grand Bahama Island and his compass was malfunctioning, he set a course to what he thought was southwest to head straight back to Fort Lauderdale. However, in reality this changed his course farther northwest, toward open ocean.

To further add to his confusion, he encountered a series of islands north of Abaco Island, which look very similar to the Key West Islands. The control tower then suggested that Taylor's team should fly west, which would have taken them to the landmass of Florida eventually. Taylor headed for what he thought was west, but in reality it was northwest, almost parallel to Florida.

After trying that for a while and with no land in sight, Taylor decided that it was impossible for them to fly so far west and not reach Florida. He believed that he might have been near the Key West Islands. What followed was a series of serious conversations between Taylor, his other aircrew and the control tower. Taylor was not sure whether he was near the Bahamas or Key West, and he was not sure which direction he faced because of a compass malfunction. The control tower informed Taylor that he could not be in Key West since the wind that day did not blow that way. Some of the aircrew believed that their compass was working. Taylor then set a course northeast according to their compass, which should take them to Florida if they were in Key West. When that failed, Taylor set a course west according to their compass, which should have taken them to Florida if they were in the Bahamas. If Taylor had stayed on this course, he would have reached land before running out of fuel. However, at some point, Taylor decided that he had tried going west enough. He then once again set a course northeast, thinking they were near Key West after all. Finally, his flight ran out of fuel and may have crashed into the ocean somewhere north of Abaco Island and east of Florida.

== Avenger wreckage mistaken for Flight 19 and other searches ==
In 1986, the wreckage of an Avenger was found off the Florida coast during the search for the wreckage of the Space Shuttle Challenger. Aviation archaeologist Jon Myhre raised this wreck from the ocean floor in 1990, but the plane was not one from Flight 19.

In 1991, a treasure-hunting expedition led by Graham Hawkes announced that the wreckage of five Avengers had been discovered off the coast of Florida, but their tail numbers revealed they were not Flight 19. In 2004, a BBC documentary showed Hawkes returning with a new submersible 12 years later and identifying one of the planes by its bureau number (a clearly readable 23990) as a flight lost at sea on October 9, 1943, over two years before Flight 19 (its crew all survived), but he was unable to definitively identify the other planes; the documentary concluded that "Despite the odds, they are just a random collection of accidents that came to rest in the same place 12 miles [19 km] from home."

In March 2012, Hawkes was reported as saying it had suited both him (and indirectly his investors) and the Pentagon to make the story go away because it was an expensive and time-consuming distraction, and that, while admitting he had found no conclusive evidence, a statistician he consulted said it was Flight 19.

Records showed that training accidents between 1942 and 1945 accounted for the loss of 95 aviation personnel from NAS Fort Lauderdale. In 1992, another expedition located scattered debris on the ocean floor, but nothing could be identified. In the 2000s, searchers expanded their search area farther east, into the Atlantic Ocean, but the remains of Flight 19 have still not been confirmed found.

A 2015 newspaper report claimed a wrecked World War II era warplane with Navy markings and two bodies still inside was retrieved by the Navy in the mid-1960s after being discovered by a hunter in the woods near Sebastian, Florida. The Navy initially said it was from Flight 19 but later recanted its statement. Despite Freedom of Information Act requests for details in 2013, the names are still not known because the Navy does not have enough information to identify the bodies.

A wrecked plane found in the Everglades in Broward County was also, incorrectly, postulated to be from Flight 19. However, it was later determined that the TBM-3E had crashed on March 16, 1947; the crash reportedly occurred because its pilot, Ensign Ralph N. Wachob, developed vertigo. Wachob was killed in the crash.

As of the 2020s, no trace of the five TBM Avengers or the PBM Mariner and the 27 missing aviators have been found. The most likely conclusion is that the Avengers ran out of gas and ditched at sea, and the PBM experienced a mid-air explosion.

== In fiction ==
Flight 19 is featured in the 1977 science-fiction film Close Encounters of the Third Kind. In the film's opening, the aircraft are discovered in the Sonoran Desert, in pristine condition with full fuel tanks, one of several mysterious events that imply extraterrestrial activity. In the film's ending scene, several men in World War II-era US naval aviator uniforms are the first people who exit the alien mothership and are returned to Earth. They are identified by officials and scientists as the crews of the planes of Flight 19 that turned up in the Sonoran Desert at the beginning of the movie, having not aged since their disappearance. However, the names they give – Lt. Frank Taylor, Capt. Harry Ward Craig, and two others – are not those of any of the missing crews of the historical Flight 19.

Flight 19 made an appearance in the 2006 direct-to-DVD movie Scooby-Doo! Pirates Ahoy!

== Crews of Flight 19 and PBM-5 BuNo 59225 ==
The men of Flight 19 and PBM-5 BuNo 59225
Aircraft number	Pilot	Crew	Bureau Nr. (BuNo)
FT-28	Charles C. Taylor, Lieutenant, USNR	George Devlin, AOM3c, USNR; Walter R. Parpart, ARM3c, USNR	23307
FT-36	E. J. Powers, Captain, USMC	Howell O. Thompson, SSgt, USMCR; George R. Paonessa, Sgt, USMC	46094
FT-3	Joseph T. Bossi, Ensign, USNR	Herman A. Thelander, S1c, USNR; Burt E. Baluk, JR., S1c, USNR	45714
FT-117	George W. Stivers, Captain, USMC	Robert P. Gruebel, Pvt, USMCR; Robert F. Gallivan, Sgt, USMC	73209
FT-81*	Forrest J. Gerber, 2ndLt, USMCR	William E. Lightfoot, PFC, USMCR	46325
BuNo 59225	Walter G. Jeffery, LTJG, USN	Harrie G. Cone, LTJG, USN; Roger M. Allen, Ensign, USN; Lloyd A. Eliason, Ensign, USN; Charles D. Arceneaux, Ensign, USN; Robert C. Cameron, RM3, USN; Wiley D. Cargill Sr., Seaman 1st, USN; James F. Jordan, ARM3, USN; John T. Menendez, AOM3, USN; Philip B. Neeman, Seaman 1st, USN; James F. Osterheld, AOM3, USN; Donald E. Peterson, AMM1, USN; Alfred J. Zywicki, Seaman 1st, USN	59225
* This particular plane was one crew member short. The airman in question, Corporal Allan Kosnar, "had asked to be excused from this exercise."

== See also ==
- List of people who disappeared at sea
- List of missing aircraft
