= Grumman TBF Avenger =

American naval torpedo bomber

TBF/TBM Avenger
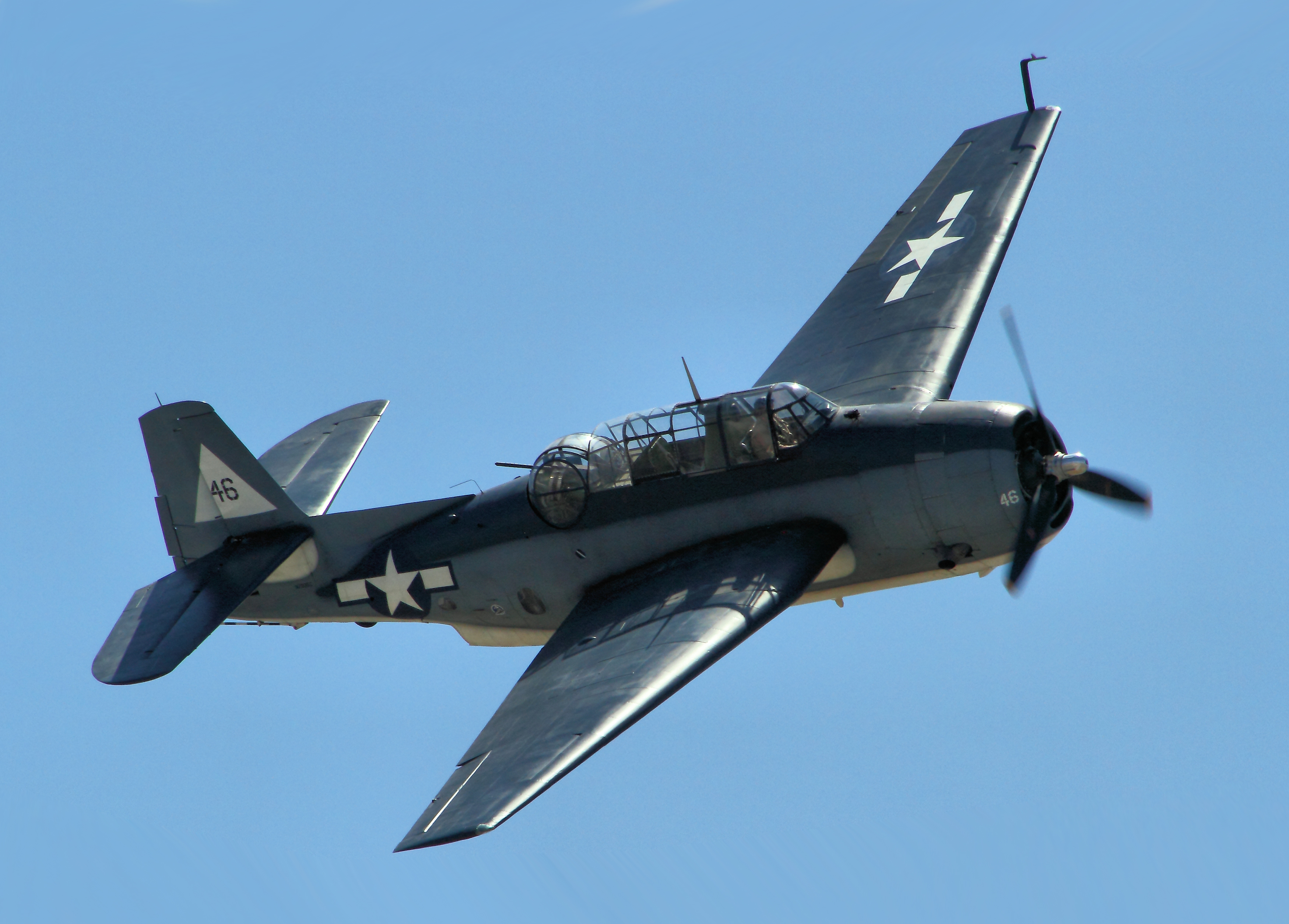
- General Motors TBM-3E Avenger in flight, 2014

General information
- Type: Torpedo bomber
- National origin: United States
- Manufacturer: Grumman
- Built by: GM Eastern Aircraft Division
- Status: Retired
- Primary users: United States Navy Royal Navy; Royal Canadian Navy; Royal New Zealand Air Force
- Number built: 9,839

History
- Introduction date: 1942
- First flight: 7 August 1941
- Retired: 1960s

The Grumman TBF Avenger (designated TBM for aircraft manufactured by General Motors) is an American World War II-era torpedo bomber developed initially for the United States Navy and Marine Corps and also eventually used by several air and naval aviation services around the world. From 1942 on, production of the Avenger (representing nearly three-quarters of its total production) was subcontracted to a purposely established division of General Motors, the Eastern Aircraft Division.

The Avenger entered U.S. service in 1942 and first saw action during the Battle of Midway, losing five of the six Avengers on its combat debut. The Avenger remained in service to become the most widely used torpedo bomber of World War II, particularly in the Pacific Theater, where it helped to sink numerous surface ships, including the super battleships Yamato and Musashi. The Avenger was also one of the most effective submarine killers in both the Pacific and Atlantic, with about 30 kills, including the cargo submarine I-52. Greatly modified after World War II, the Avenger remained in use until the 1960s.

== Design and development ==
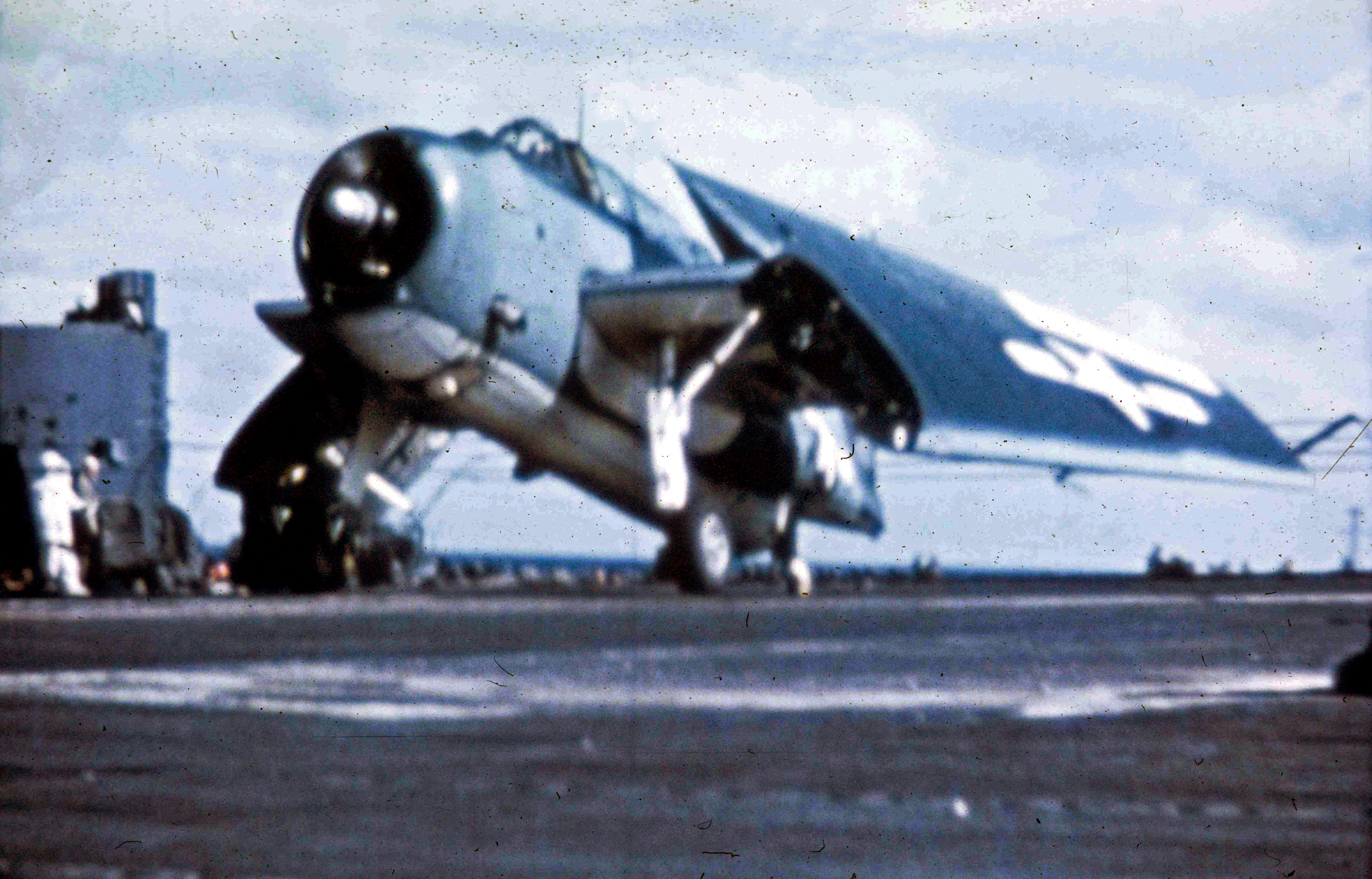
A TBM with Sto-Wing folding wings

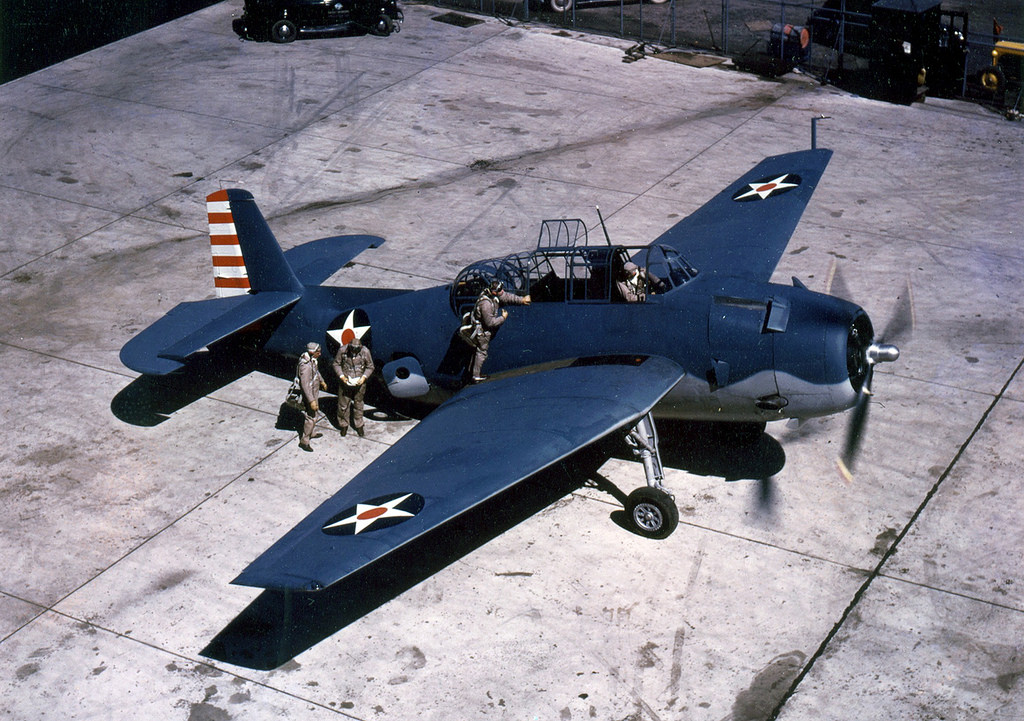
TBF-1 Avenger early in 1942. Note the red spot centered in the U.S. roundel and flag-inspired fin flash on the rudder, both of which were removed prior to the Battle of Midway to avoid confusion with Japanese insignia.

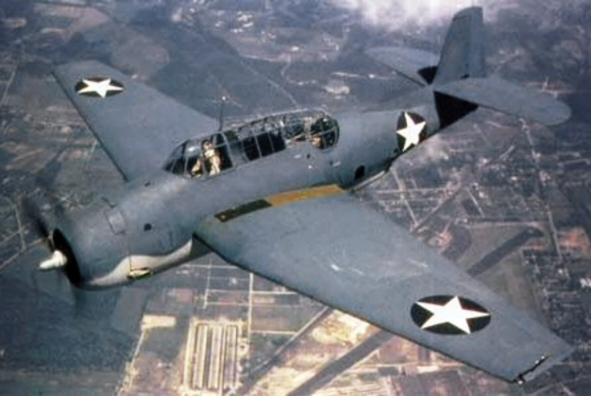
TBF Avenger in mid-1942

The Douglas TBD Devastator, the U.S. Navy's main torpedo bomber introduced in 1935, was obsolete by 1939. Bids were accepted from several companies, but Grumman's TBF design was selected as the replacement for the TBD, and in April 1940, two prototypes were ordered by the Navy. Designed by Leroy Grumman, the first prototype was called the XTBF-1. It was first flown on 7 August 1941. Although one of the first two prototypes crashed near Brentwood, New York, rapid production continued.

To ease carrier storage concerns, simultaneously with the F4F-4 model of its Wildcat carrier fighter, Grumman designed the Avenger to also use the new Sto-Wing patented "compound angle" wing-folding mechanism, intended to maximize storage space on an aircraft carrier; the Wildcat's replacement, the F6F Hellcat, also employed this mechanism. The engine used was the twin-row Wright R-2600-20 Twin Cyclone 14-cylinder radial engine, which produced 1,900 horsepower (1,420 kW).

The three crew members were the pilot, turret gunner, and radioman/bombardier/ventral gunner. A single synchronized .30 caliber (7.62 mm) machine gun was mounted in the nose, a .50 caliber (12.7 mm) gun was mounted right next to the turret gunner's head in a rear-facing, electrically powered turret, and a single 0.30 caliber (7.62 mm) hand-fired machine gun flexibly mounted ventrally (under the tail), which was used to defend against enemy fighters attacking from below and to the rear. This gun was fired by the radioman/bombardier while standing up and bending over in the belly of the tail section, though he usually sat on a folding bench facing forward to operate the radio and to sight in bombing runs.

Later models of the TBF/TBM omitted the cowl-mount synchronized 0.30 caliber (7.62 mm) gun and replaced it with twin Browning AN/M2 0.50 caliber (12.7 mm) light-barrel guns, one in each wing outboard of the propeller arc, per pilots' requests for better forward firepower and increased strafing ability. Only one set of controls was on the aircraft, and no direct access to the pilot's position existed from the rest of the aircraft's interior. The radio equipment was massive, especially by today's standards, and filled the length of the well-framed "greenhouse" canopy to the rear of the pilot. The radios were accessible for repair through a "tunnel" along the right side. Any Avengers that are still flying today usually have an additional rear-mounted seat in place of the radios, allowing for a fourth passenger.

The Avenger had a large bomb bay, allowing for one Mark 13 torpedo, a single 2,000-pound (907 kg) bomb, or up to four 500-pound (227 kg) bombs. The aircraft had overall ruggedness and stability, and pilots say it flew like a truck, for better or worse. With its good radio facilities, docile handling, and long range, the Grumman Avenger also made an ideal command aircraft for commanders of air groups (CAGs). Later Avenger models carried radar equipment for the antisubmarine warfare (ASW) and airborne early warning (AEW) roles. With a 30,000 ft (9,000 m) ceiling and a fully loaded range of 1,000 miles (1,600 km), the Avenger was better than any previous American torpedo bomber. The Avenger was also superior to its Japanese counterpart, the Nakajima B5N "Kate", which neared obsolescence by 1941.

Escort carrier sailors referred to the TBF as the "turkey" because of its size and maneuverability in comparison to the F4F Wildcat fighters in the same air groups.

== Operational history ==
=== U.S. Navy ===
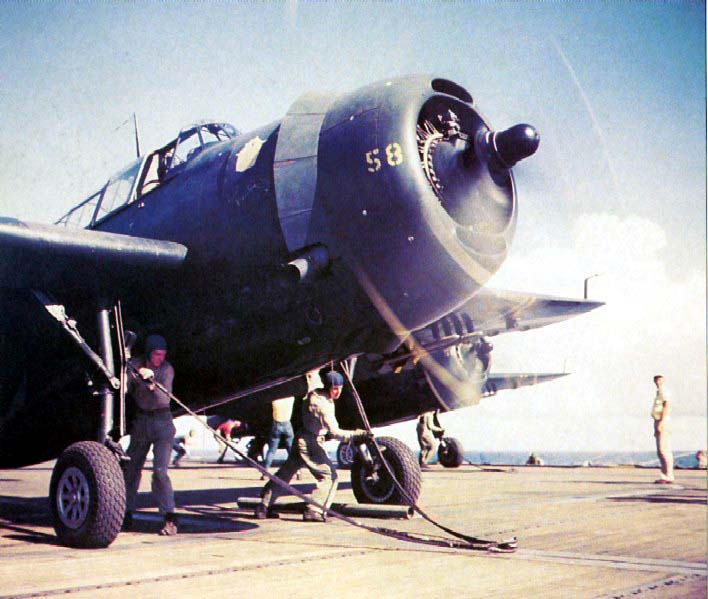
TBM Avenger ready for catapult launch

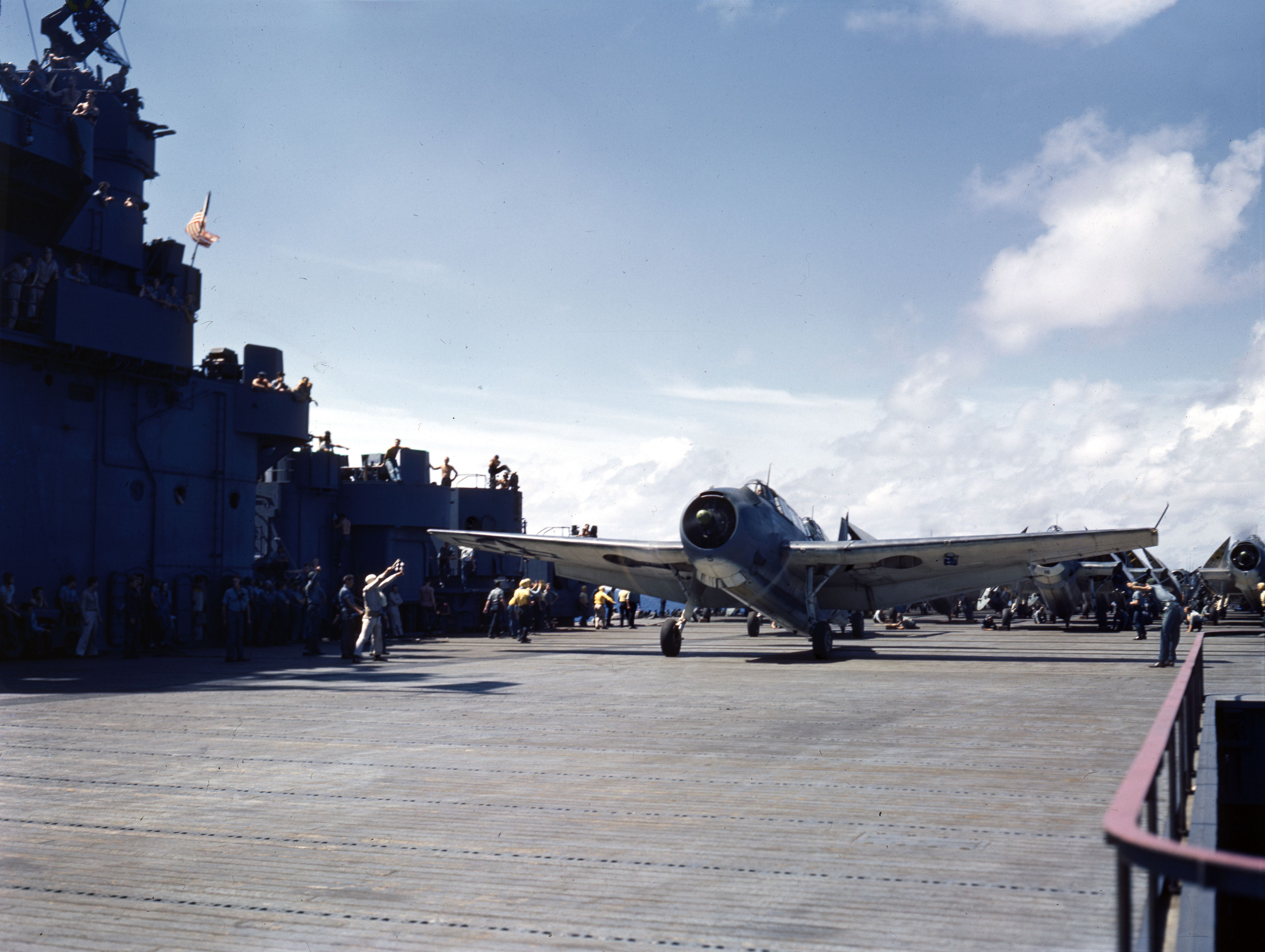
A Grumman TBF Avenger aboard USS Yorktown, c. late 1943

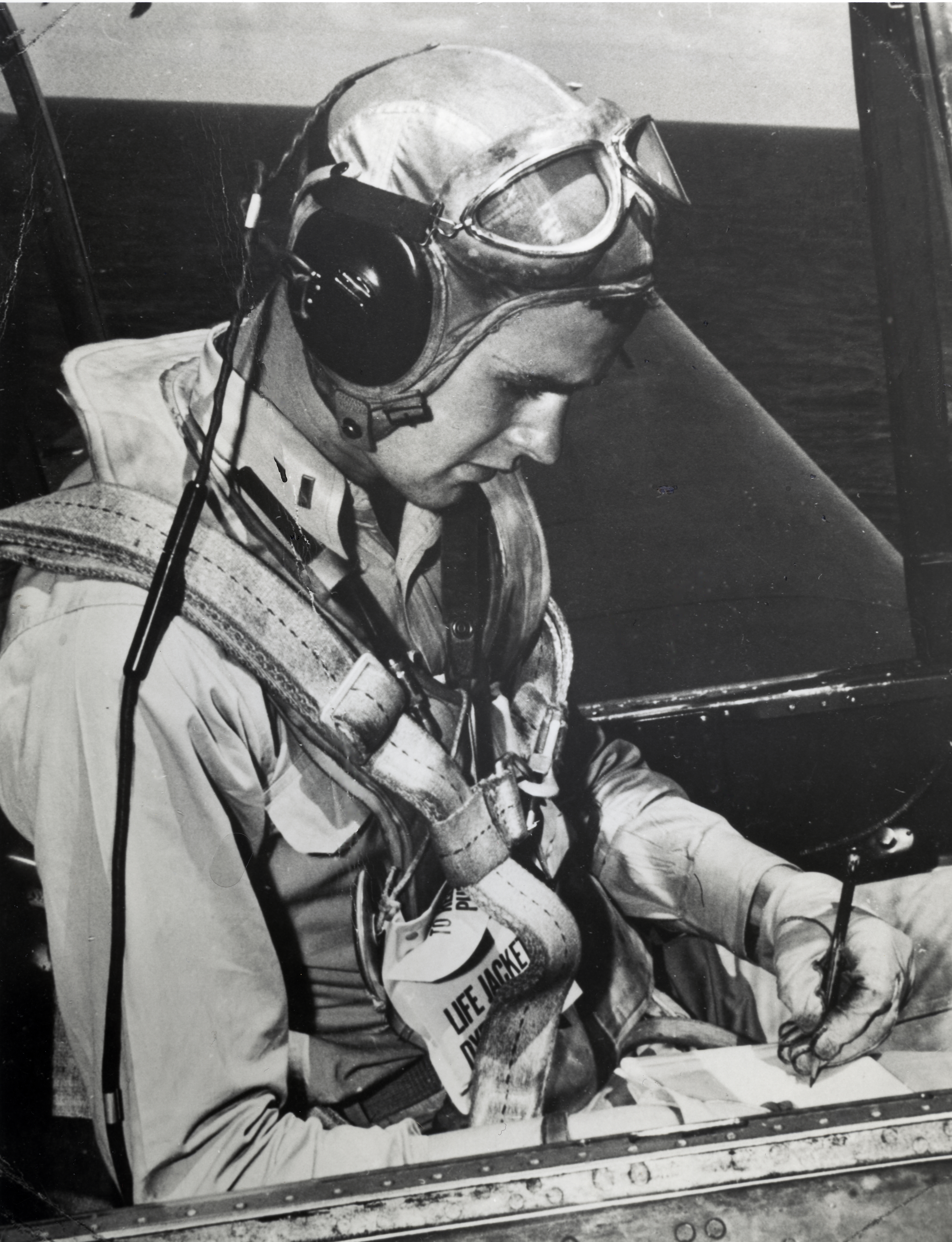
Future American President George H. W. Bush, in a TBM Avenger on the light aircraft carrier USS San Jacinto in 1944

On the afternoon of 7 December 1941, Grumman held a ceremony to open a new manufacturing plant and display the new TBF to the public. Coincidentally, on that day, the Imperial Japanese Navy attacked Pearl Harbor, as Grumman soon found out. After the ceremony was over, the plant was quickly sealed off to guard against possible sabotage. By early June 1942, a shipment of more than 100 aircraft was sent to the Navy, arriving only a few hours after the three carriers quickly departed from Pearl Harbor, so most of them were too late to participate in the pivotal Battle of Midway.

Six TBF-1s were present on Midway Island – as part of VT-8 (Torpedo Squadron 8) – while the rest of the squadron flew Devastators from the aircraft carrier Hornet. Both types of torpedo bombers suffered heavy casualties. Out of the six Avengers, five were shot down and the other returned heavily damaged with one of its gunners killed, and the other gunner and the pilot wounded. Author Gordon Prange posited in Miracle at Midway that the outdated Devastators (and lack of new aircraft) contributed somewhat to the lack of a complete victory at Midway (the four Japanese fleet carriers were sunk directly by dive bombers, instead). Others pointed out that the inexperienced American pilots and lack of fighter cover were responsible for poor showing of US torpedo bombers, regardless of type. Later in the war, with growing American air superiority, better attack coordination and more veteran pilots, Avengers were able to play vital roles in the subsequent battles against Japanese surface forces.

On 24 August 1942, the next major naval aircraft carrier battle occurred at the Eastern Solomons. Based on the carriers Saratoga and Enterprise, the 24 TBFs present were able to sink the Japanese light carrier Ryūjō and claim one dive bomber, at the cost of seven aircraft.

The first major "prize" for the TBFs (which had been assigned the name "Avenger" in October 1941, before the Japanese attack on Pearl Harbor) was at the Naval Battle of Guadalcanal in November 1942, when Marine Corps and Navy Avengers helped sink the Japanese battleship Hiei, which had already been crippled the night before in a surface action against U.S. cruisers and destroyers.

After hundreds of the original TBF-1 models were built, the TBF-1C began production. The allotment of space for specialized internal and wing-mounted fuel tanks doubled the Avenger's range. By 1943, Grumman began to slowly phase out production of the Avenger to produce F6F Hellcat fighters, and the Eastern Aircraft Division of General Motors took over production, with these aircraft being designated TBM. The Eastern Aircraft plant was located in Ewing, New Jersey. Grumman delivered a TBF-1, held together with sheet metal screws, so that the automotive engineers could disassemble it, one part at a time, and redesign the aircraft for automotive-style production. This aircraft was known as the "P-K Avenger" ("P-K" being an abbreviation for Parker-Kalon, manufacturer of sheet metal screws). Starting in mid-1944, the TBM-3 began production (with a more powerful powerplant and wing hardpoints for drop tanks and rockets). The TBM-3 was the most numerous of the Avengers (with about 4,600 produced). However, most of the Avengers in service were TBM-1s until near the end of the war in 1945.

After the "Marianas Turkey Shoot", in which more than 250 Japanese aircraft were downed, Admiral Marc Mitscher ordered a 220-aircraft mission to find the Japanese task force. Fighting 300 nmi (560 km) away from the fleet at the extreme end of their range, the group of Hellcats, TBF/TBMs, and dive bombers took many casualties. However, Avengers from the Independence-class aircraft carrier USS Belleau Wood sank the light carrier Hiyō as their only major prize. Mitscher's gamble did not pay off as well as he had hoped.

In June 1943, shortly before his 19th birthday, future president George H. W. Bush was commissioned as the youngest naval aviator at the time. Later, while flying a TBM with VT-51 (from USS San Jacinto), his Avenger was shot down on 2 September 1944 over the Pacific island of Chichi Jima. However, he released his payload and hit the radio tower target before being forced to bail out over water. Both of his crewmates died. He was rescued at sea by the American submarine USS Finback. He later received the Distinguished Flying Cross.

Another famous Avenger aviator was Paul Newman, who flew as a rear gunner. He had hoped to be accepted for pilot training, but did not qualify because he was color blind. Newman was on board the escort carrier USS Hollandia roughly 500 mi (800 km) from Japan when the Enola Gay dropped the first atomic bomb on Hiroshima.

The Avenger was the type of torpedo bomber used during the sinking of the two Japanese "super battleships", with the US Navy having complete air superiority in both engagements: Musashi and Yamato.

Besides the traditional surface role as a torpedo bomber against surface ships, Avengers were also used for ASW. In the Atlantic, once escort carriers were finally available to escort Allied convoys, Avengers were deployed alongside Grumman F4F Wildcats, and both types provided air cover and warded off attacking German U-boats. Avengers were one of the most effective submarine killers in both the Pacific and Atlantic, with about 30 kills, including the cargo submarine I-52.

The postwar disappearance on 5 December 1945 of a flight of five American Avengers, known as Flight 19, was later added to the Bermuda Triangle legend, first written about by Edward Van Winkle Jones in an Associated Press article published in September 1950.

During World War II, the US aeronautical research arm NACA used a complete Avenger in a comprehensive drag-reduction study in their large Langley wind tunnel.

=== Royal Navy ===
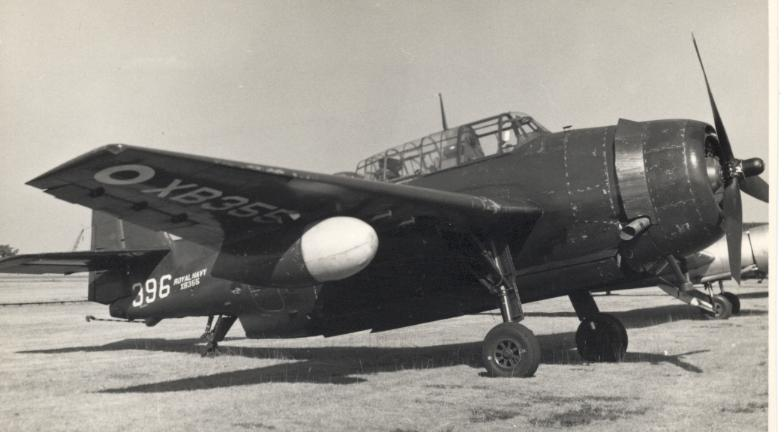
Royal Navy Grumman Avenger AS.4 XB355 'CU 396' of 744 Squadron at Blackbushe in 1955

The Avenger was also used by the Royal Navy's Fleet Air Arm (FAA), where it was initially known as the "Tarpon". Initial test flights were carried out by British Admiralty test pilot Roy Sydney Baker-Falkner at RAF Boscombe Down. However, this name was later discontinued and the Avenger name used, instead, as part of the process of the FAA universally adopting the U.S. Navy's names for American naval aircraft. The first 402 aircraft were known as Avenger Mk I, 334 TBM-1s from Grumman were called the Avenger Mk II, and 334 TBM-3 were designated the Mk III. An interesting kill by a Royal Navy Avenger was the destruction of a V-1 flying bomb on 9 July 1944. The much faster V-1 was overtaking the Avenger when the telegraphist air gunner in the dorsal turret, Leading Airman Fred Shirmer, fired at it from 700 yards (640 m). For this achievement, Shirmer was Mentioned in Dispatches, later being awarded the DSM for the 1945 Operation Meridian action at Palembang. In the January 1945 British carrier raid on the Soengei Gerong oil refinery during Operation Meridian, an FAA Avenger shot down a Nakajima Ki-44 "Tojo" in low level combat over the jungle. Three Avengers were modified to carry the Highball "bouncing bomb" (given the new codename Tammany Hall), but when trials were unsuccessful, they were returned to standard configuration and passed to the Royal Navy.

One hundred USN TBM-3Es were supplied to the FAA in 1953 under the US Mutual Defense Assistance Program. The aircraft were shipped from Norfolk, Virginia, many aboard the Royal Navy aircraft carrier HMS Perseus. The Avengers were fitted with British equipment by Scottish Aviation and delivered as the Avenger AS.4 to several FAA squadrons, including Nos. 767, 814, 815, 820, and 824. The aircraft were replaced from 1954 by Fairey Gannets and were passed to squadrons of the Royal Naval Volunteer Reserve, including Nos. 1841 and 1844 until the RNVR Air Branch was disbanded in 1957. The survivors were transferred to the French Navy in 1957–1958.

=== Royal New Zealand Air Force ===
The only other operator in World War II was the Royal New Zealand Air Force, which used the type primarily as a bomber, equipping Nos. 30 and 31 Squadrons, with both operating from South Pacific island bases during 1944 in support of the Bougainville campaign. Some of the Avengers were later transferred to the British Pacific Fleet.

In 1945, Avengers were involved in pioneering trials of aerial topdressing in New Zealand that led to the establishment of an industry which markedly increased food production and efficiency in farming worldwide. Pilots of the Royal New Zealand Air Force's No. 42 Squadron spread fertilizer from Avengers beside runways at Ohakea Air Base and provided a demonstration for farmers at Hood Aerodrome, Masterton, New Zealand.

=== Royal Canadian Navy ===
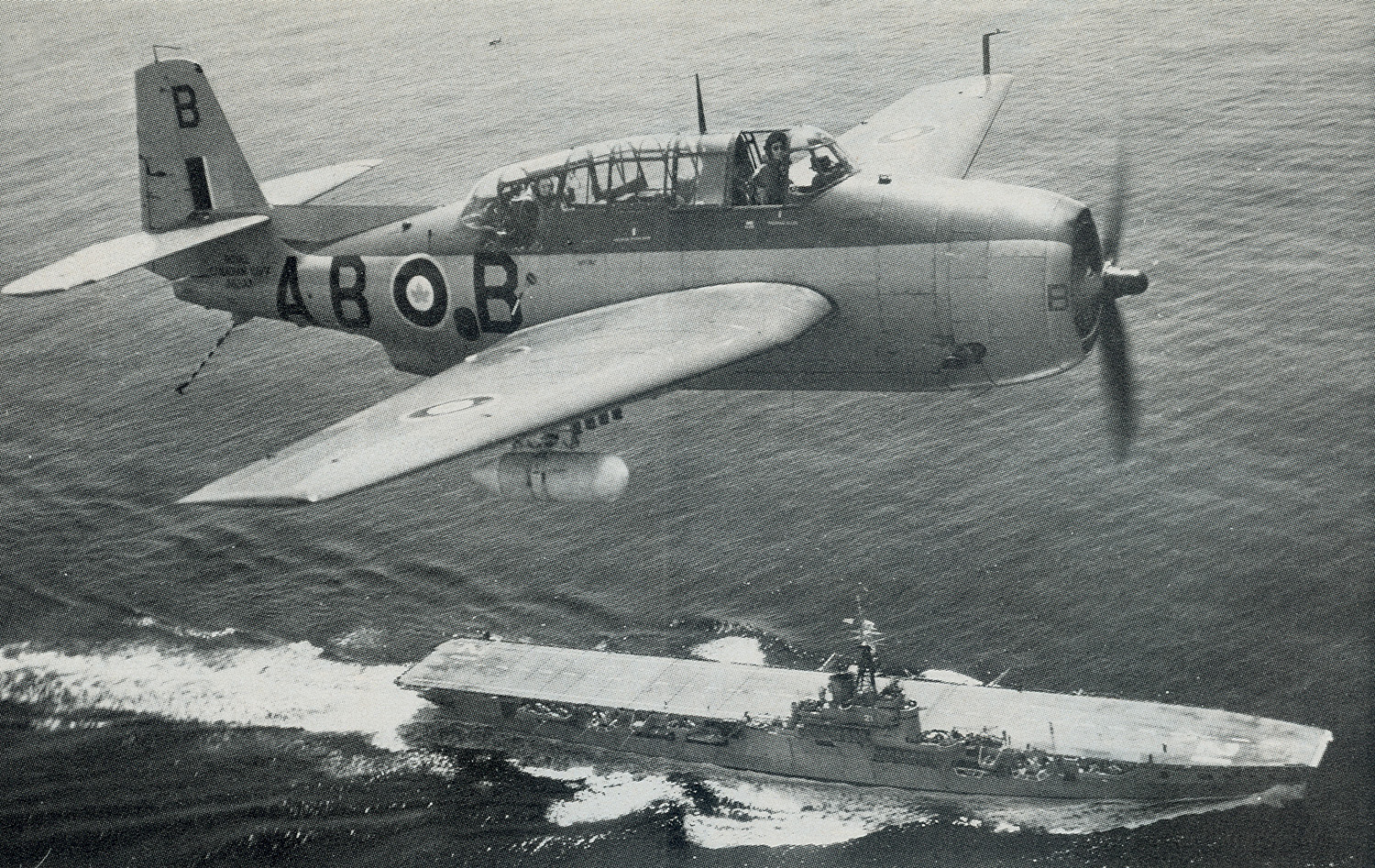
A Royal Canadian Navy Avenger over HMCS Magnificent

One of the primary postwar users of the Avenger was the Royal Canadian Navy (RCN), which obtained 125 former US Navy TBM-3E Avengers from 1950 to 1952 to replace their Fairey Fireflies. By the time the Avengers were delivered, the RCN was shifting its primary focus to anti-submarine warfare (ASW), and the aircraft was rapidly becoming obsolete as an attack platform. Consequently, 98 of the RCN Avengers were fitted with an extensive number of novel ASW modifications, including radar, electronic countermeasures (ECM) equipment, and sonobuoys, and the upper ball turret was replaced with a sloping glass canopy that was better suited for observation duties. The modified Avengers were designated AS 3. A number of these aircraft were later fitted with a large magnetic anomaly detector (MAD) boom on the rear left side of the fuselage and were redesignated AS 3M. However, RCN leaders soon realized the Avenger's shortcomings as an ASW aircraft, and in 1954 they elected to replace the AS 3 with the Grumman S-2 Tracker, which offered longer range, greater load-carrying capacity for electronics and armament, and a second engine, a great safety benefit when flying long-range ASW patrols over frigid North Atlantic waters. As delivery of the new license-built CS2F Trackers began in 1957, the Avengers were shifted to training duties and were officially retired in July 1960.

=== Camouflage research ===
TBM Avengers were used in wartime research into counter-illumination camouflage. The torpedo bombers were fitted with Yehudi lights, a set of forward-pointing lights automatically adjusted to match the brightness of the sky. The planes therefore appeared as bright as the sky, rather than as dark shapes. The technology, a development of the Canadian navy's diffused lighting camouflage research, allowed an Avenger to advance to within 3,000 yards (2,700 m) before being seen.

=== Civilian use ===
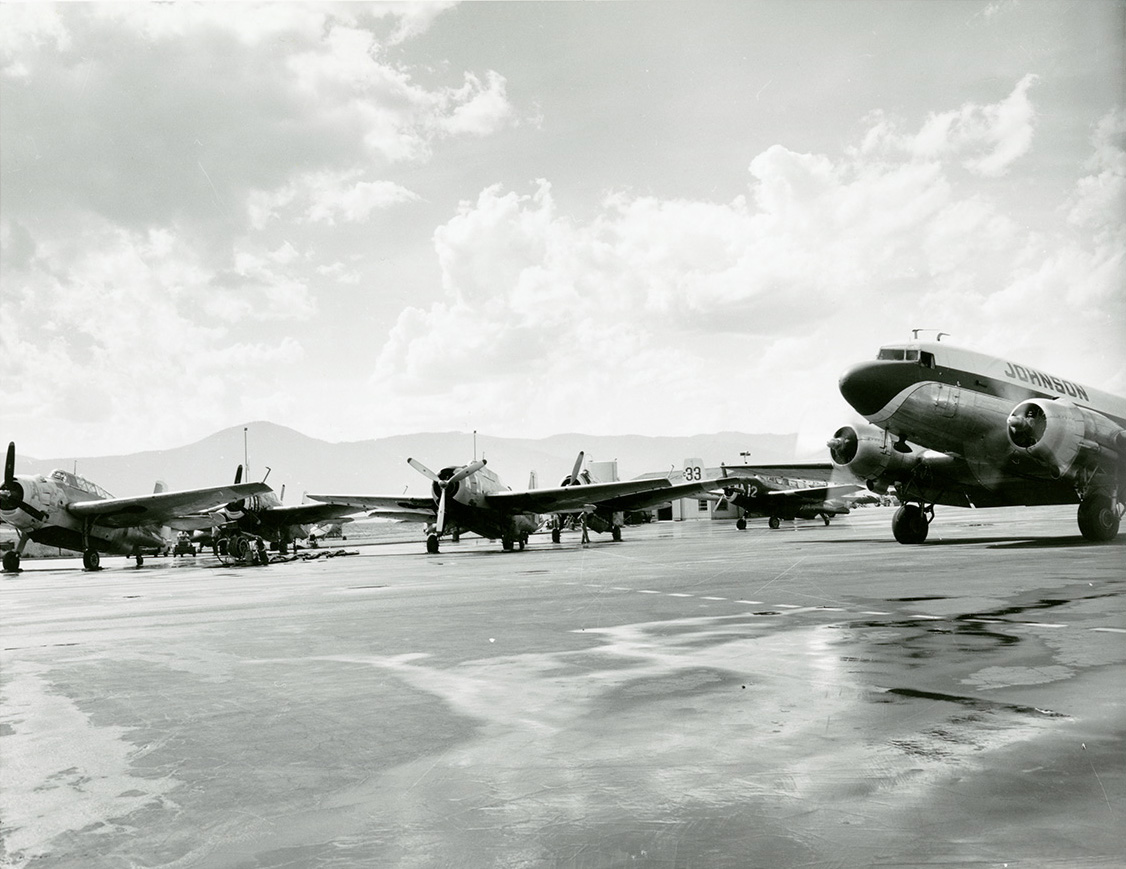
Johnson Flying Service TBM Avengers modified to drop fire retardant: Missoula, Montana 1967

Many Avengers have survived into the 21st century working as spray applicators and water bombers throughout North America, particularly in the Canadian province of New Brunswick.

Forest Protection Limited (FPL) of Fredericton, New Brunswick, once owned and operated the largest civilian fleet of Avengers in the world. FPL began operating Avengers in 1958 after purchasing 12 surplus TBM-3E aircraft from the RCN. Use of the Avenger fleet at FPL peaked in 1971 when 43 aircraft were in use as both water bombers and spray aircraft. The company sold three Avengers in 2004 (C-GFPS, C-GFPM, and C-GLEJ) to museums or private collectors. The Central New Brunswick Woodsmen's Museum has a former FPL Avenger on static display. An FPL Avenger that crashed in 1975 in southwestern New Brunswick was recovered and restored by a group of interested aviation enthusiasts and is currently on display at the Atlantic Canada Aviation Museum. FPL was still operating three Avengers in 2010 configured as water-bombers, and stationed at Miramichi Airport. One of these crashed just after takeoff on 23 April 2010, killing the pilot. The last FPL Avenger was retired on 26 July 2012 and sold to the Shearwater Aviation Museum in Dartmouth, Nova Scotia.

Several other Avengers, usually flying as warbirds, are in private collections around the world today. They are a popular airshow fixture in both flying and static displays.

In 2020, the Commemorative Air Force (CAF) flew three TBM Avengers: with one based with the Rocky Mountain Wing in Grand Junction, Colorado; another with the Missouri Wing at St Charles Smartt Field; and their newest with the Capital Wing in Culpeper, Virginia. Each of these allow non-CAF members to ride in the aircraft for a Living History Flight Experience.

== Variants ==
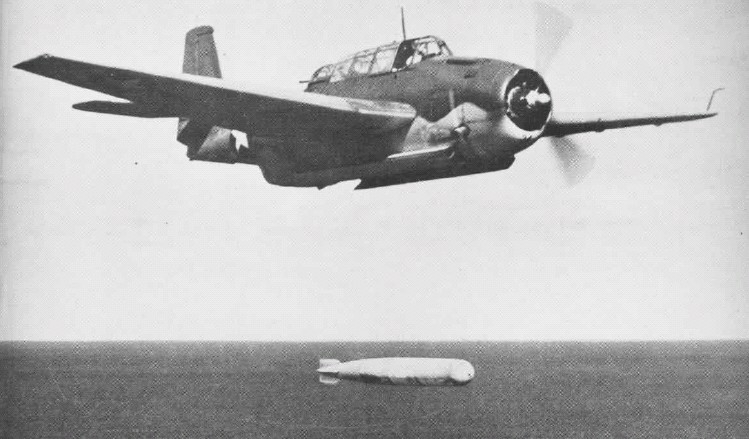
A TBF-1 dropping a torpedo

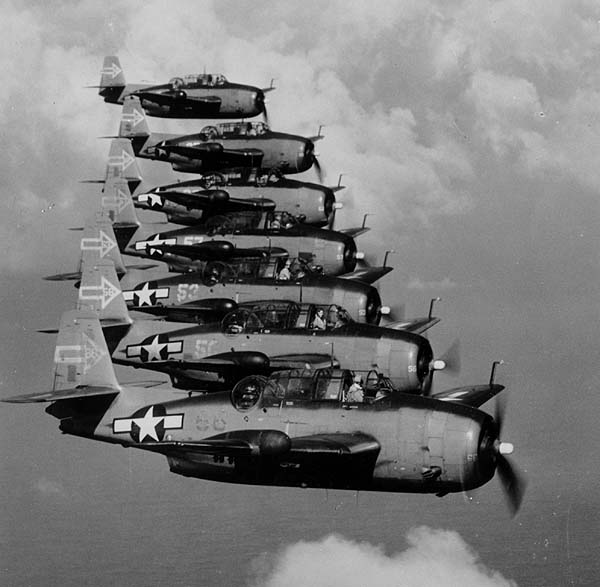
TBM-3Ds of VT(N)-90 January 1945

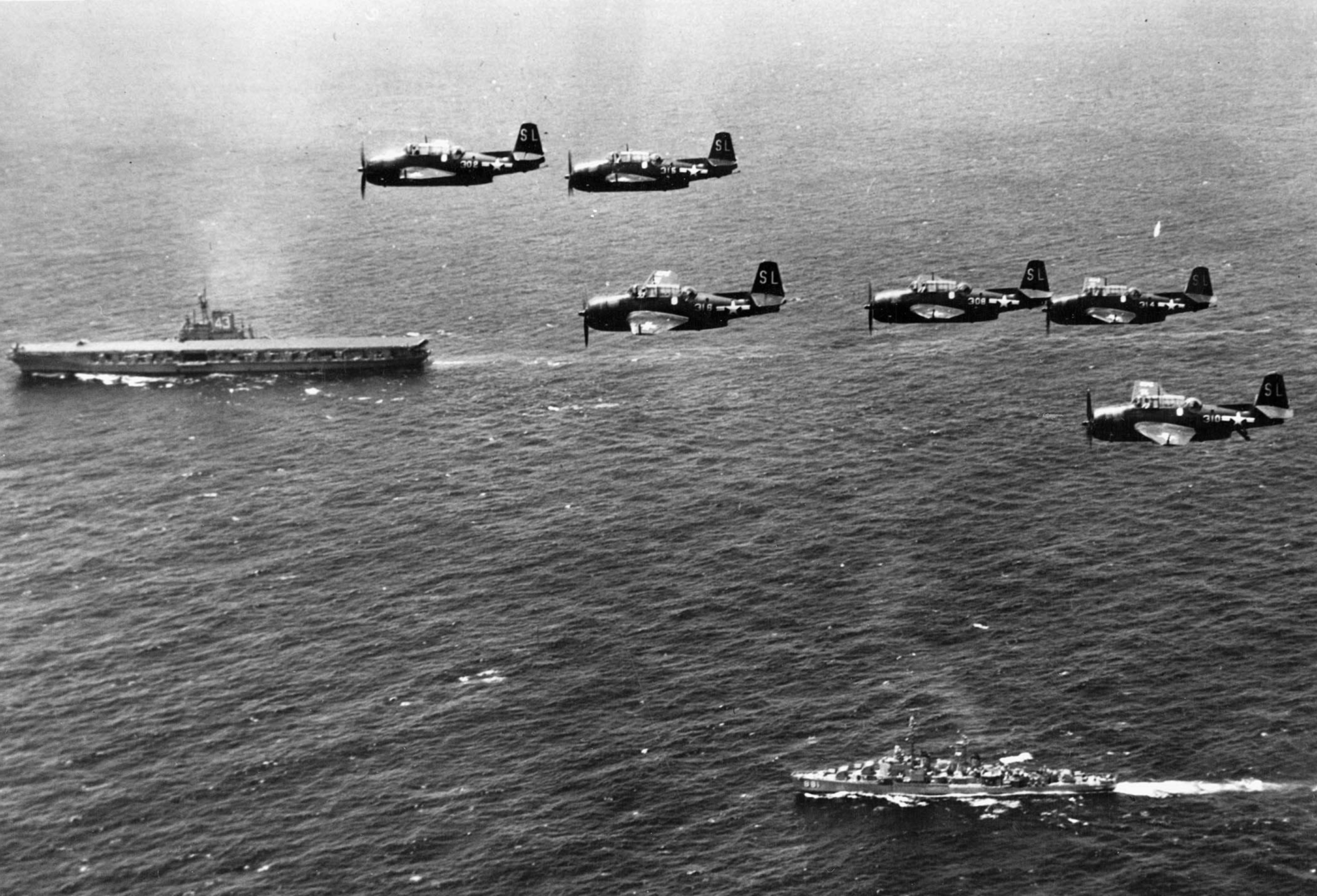
Six U.S. Navy Grumman TBM-3E Avenger anti-submarine aircraft of Composite Squadron VC-22 Checkmates flying over the Mediterranean Sea

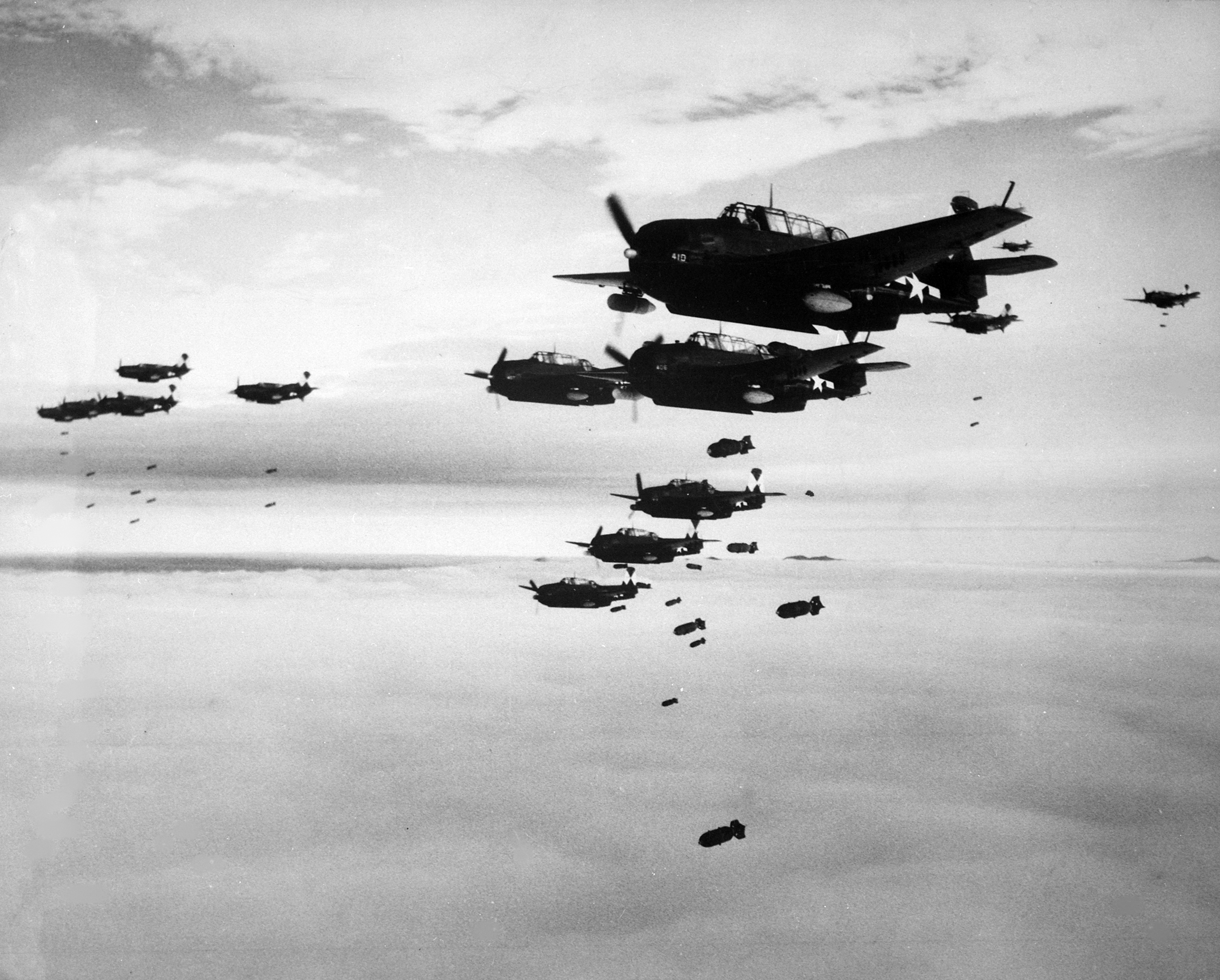
US Navy TBMs (foreground) and SB2C Helldivers drop bombs on Hakodate in July 1945

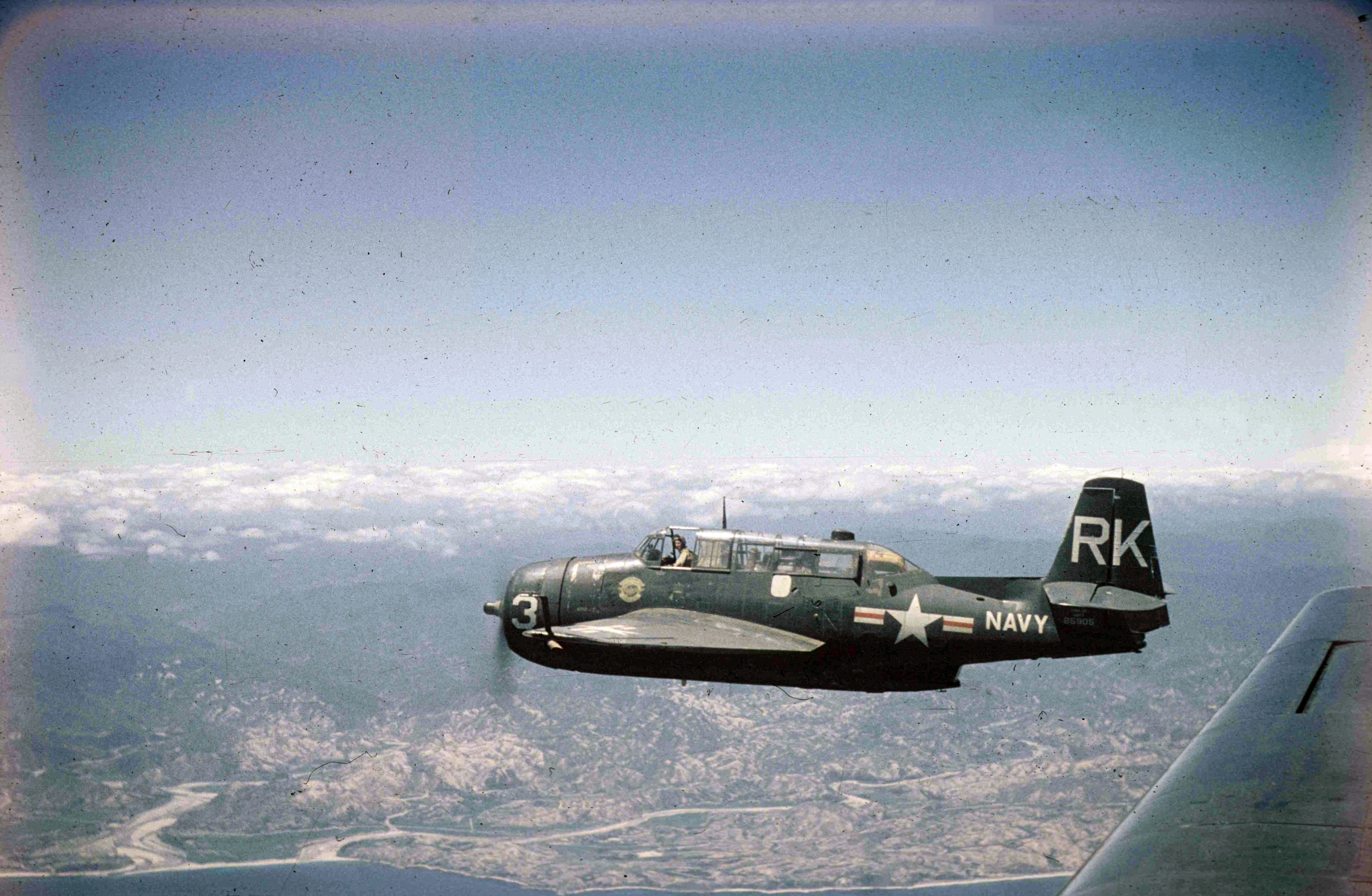
A TBM-3R COD plane in the early 1950s

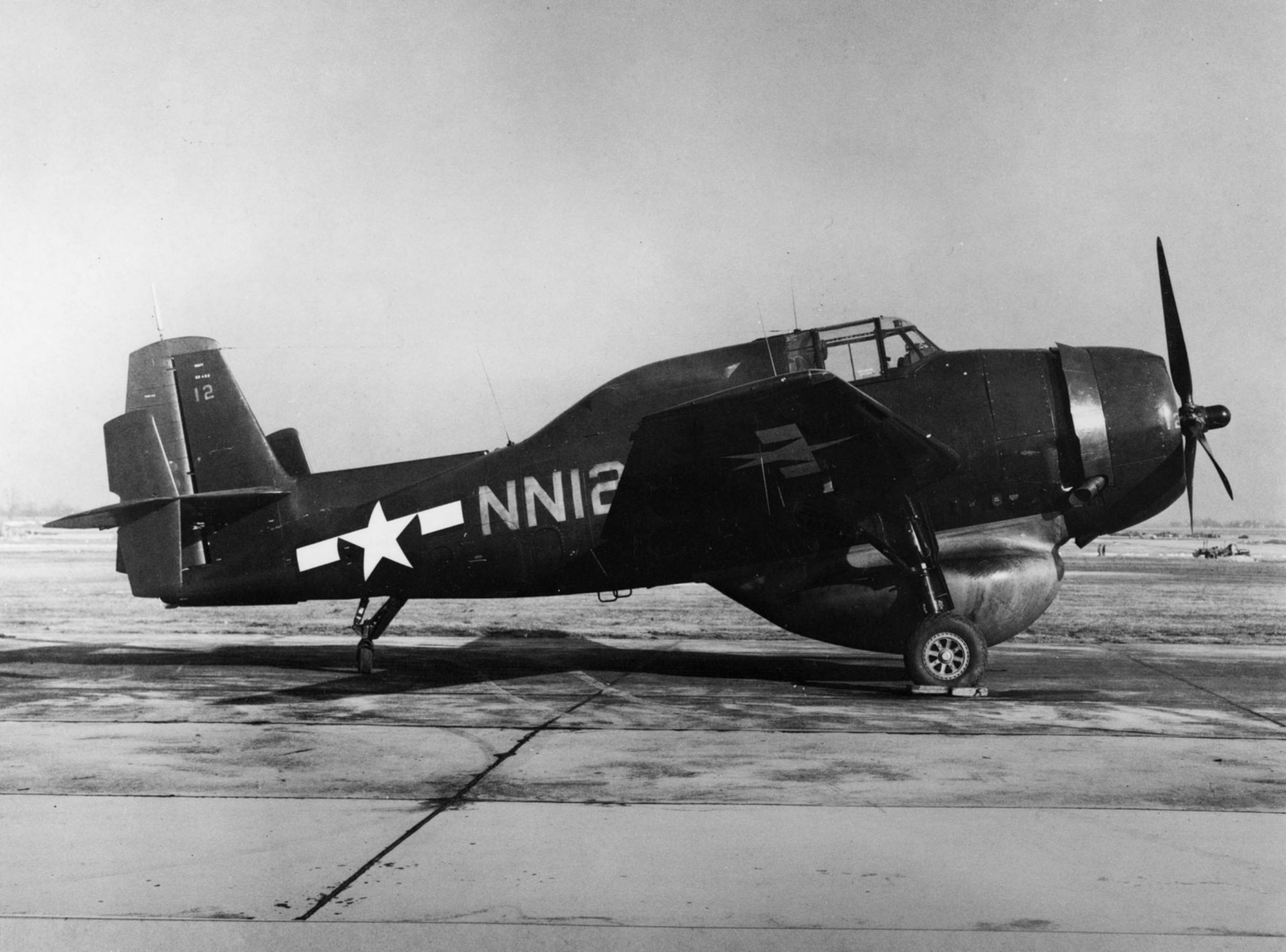
TBM-3W

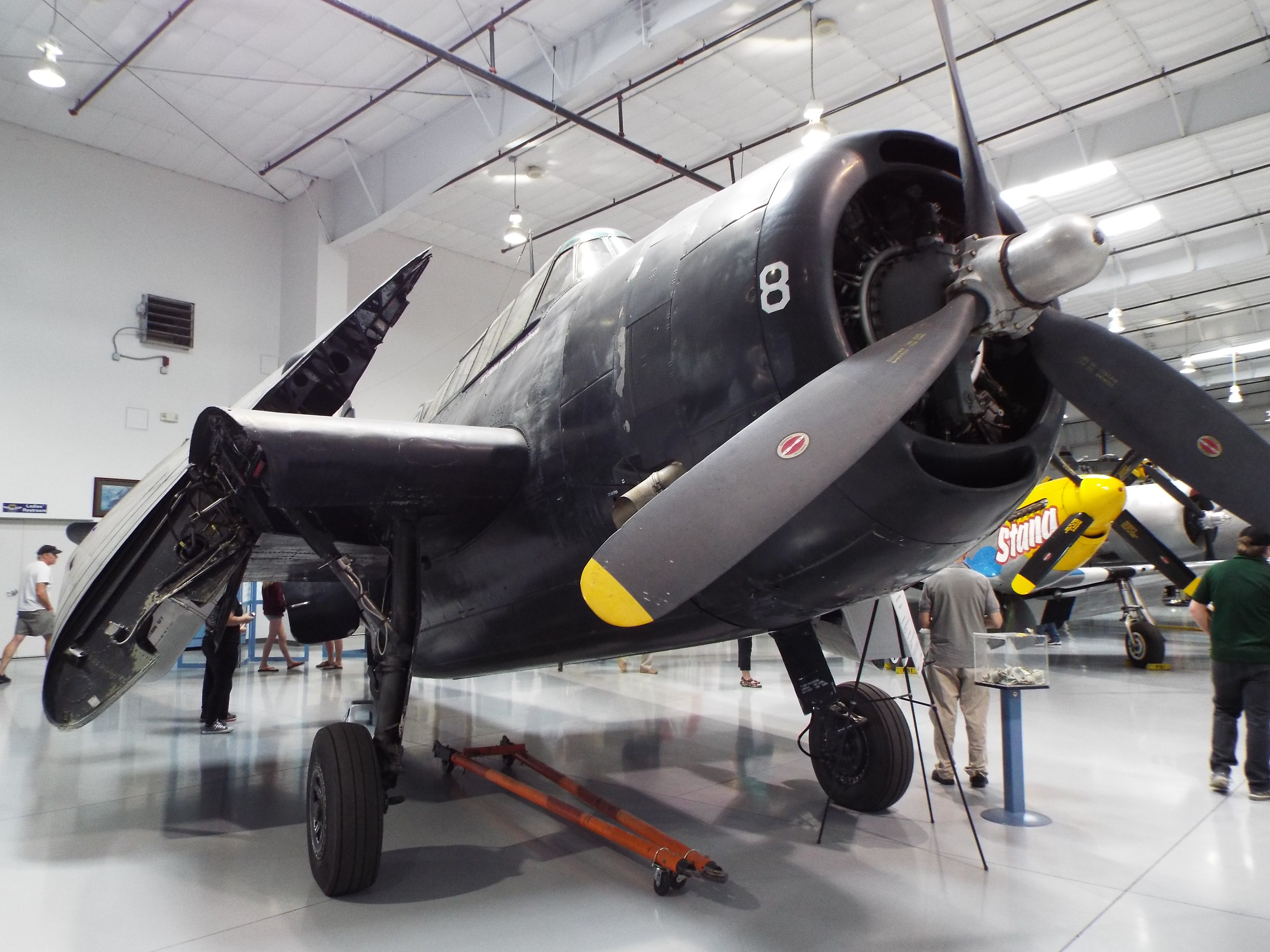
TBM Avenger Torpedo Bomber

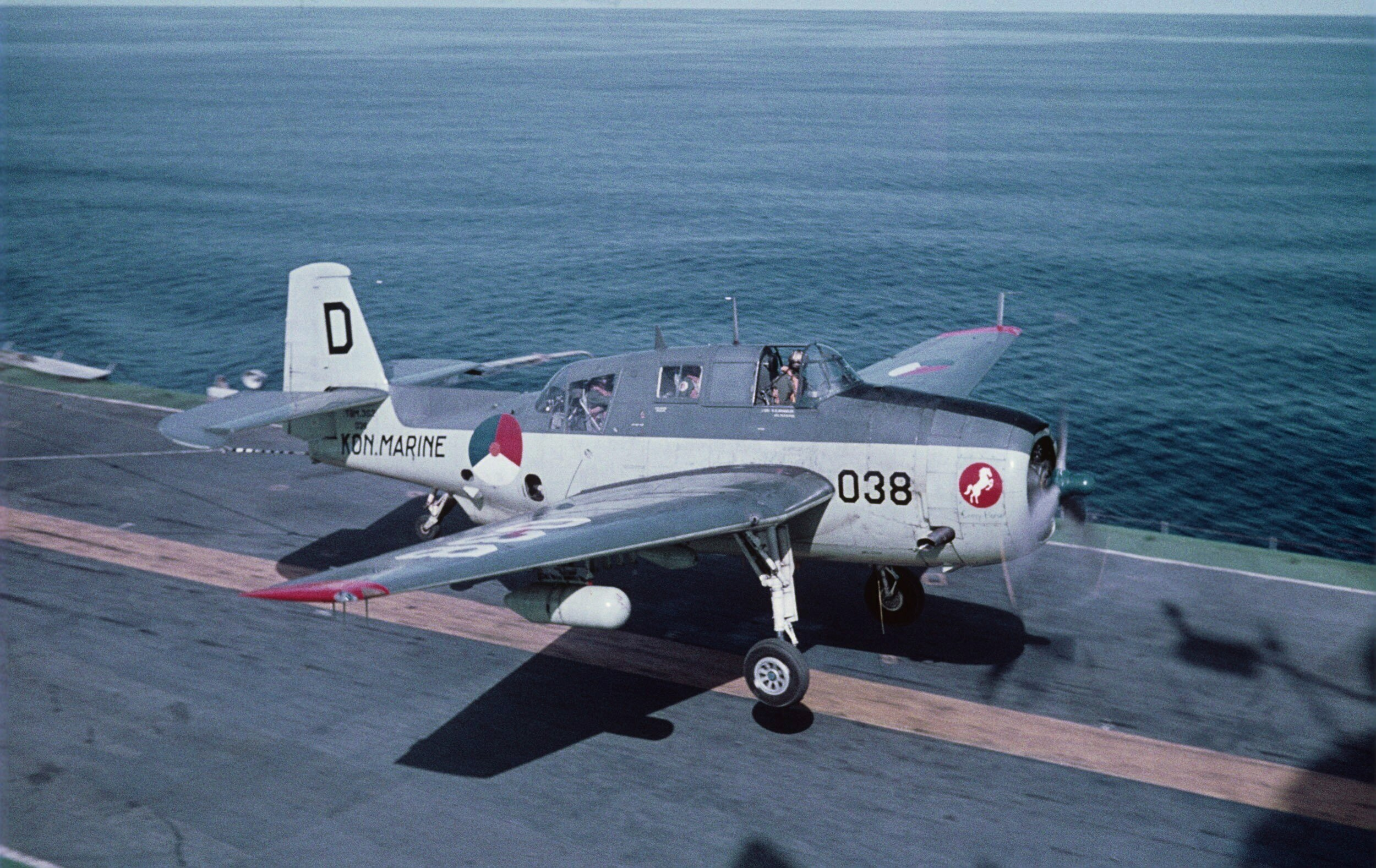
TBM-3S2 submarine attack variant of the Royal Netherlands Navy.

=== TBF ===
XTBF-1
Prototypes each powered by a 1,700 hp (1,300 kW) R-2600-8 engine, second aircraft introduced the large dorsal fin. (2 built)
TBF-1
Initial production model based on the second prototype. (1,526 built)
TBF-1C
TBF-1 with provision for two 0.5 in (12.7 mm) wing guns and fuel capacity increased to 726 US gal (2,748 L). (765 built)
TBF-1B
Paper designation for the Avenger I for the Royal Navy.
TBF-1D
TBF-1 conversions with centimetric radar in radome on right wing leading edge.
TBF-1CD
TBF-1C conversions with centimetric radar in radome on right wing leading edge.
TBF-1E
TBF-1 conversions with additional electronic equipment.
TBF-1J
TBF-1 equipped for bad weather operations
TBF-1L
TBF-1 equipped with retractable searchlight in bomb bay.
TBF-1P
TBF-1 conversion for photo-reconnaissance
TBF-1CP
TBF-1C conversion for photo-reconnaissance
XTBF-2
TBF-1 re-engined with a 1,900 hp (1,400 kW) XR-2600-10 engine.
XTBF-3
TBF-1 re-engined with 1,900 hp (1,400 kW) R-2600-20 engines.
TBF-3
Planned production version of the XTBF-3, cancelled

=== TBM ===
TBM-1
as TBF-1. (550 built)
TBM-1C
as TBF-1C. (2336 built)
TBM-1D
TBM-1 conversions with centimetric radar in radome on right wing leading edge.
TBM-1E
TBM-1 conversions with additional electronic equipment.
TBM-1J
TBM-1 equipped for all weather operations
TBM-1L
TBM-1 equipped with retractable searchlight in bomb bay.
TBM-1P
TBM-1 conversion for photo-reconnaissance
TBM-1CP
TBM-1C conversion for photo-reconnaissance
TBM-2
One TBM-1 re-engined with a 1,900 hp (1,400 kW) XR-2600-10 engine.
XTBM-3
Four TBM-1C aircraft with 1,900 hp (1,400 kW) R-2600-20 engines.
TBM-3
as TBM-1C, double cooling intakes, engine upgrade, minor changes. (4,011 built)
TBM-3D
TBM-3 conversion with centimetric radar in radome on right wing leading edge.
TBM-3E
as TBM-3, stronger airframe, search radar, ventral gun deleted. (646 built).
TBM-3H
TBM-3 conversion with surface search radar.
TBM-3J
TBM-3 equipped for all weather operations
TBM-3L
TBM-3 equipped with retractable searchlight in bomb bay.
TBM-3M
TBM-3 conversion as a Tiny Tim rocket launcher.
TBM-3N
TBM-3 conversion for night attack.
TBM-3P
TBM-3 conversion for photo-reconnaissance.
TBM-3Q
TBM-3 conversion for electronic countermeasures, retained gun turret.
TBM-3R
TBM-3 conversions as seven-passenger, Carrier onboard delivery transport.
TBM-3S
TBM-3 conversion as an anti-submarine strike version.
TBM-3U
TBM-3 conversion as a general utility and target version.
TBM-3W
TBM-3 conversion as the first ship based airborne early warning control and relay platform with AN/APS-20 radar in ventral radome.
XTBM-4
Prototypes based on TBM-3E with modified wing incorporating a reinforced center section and a different folding mechanism. (3 built)
TBM-4
Production version of XTBM-4, 2,141 on order were cancelled.

=== Royal Navy Avenger ===
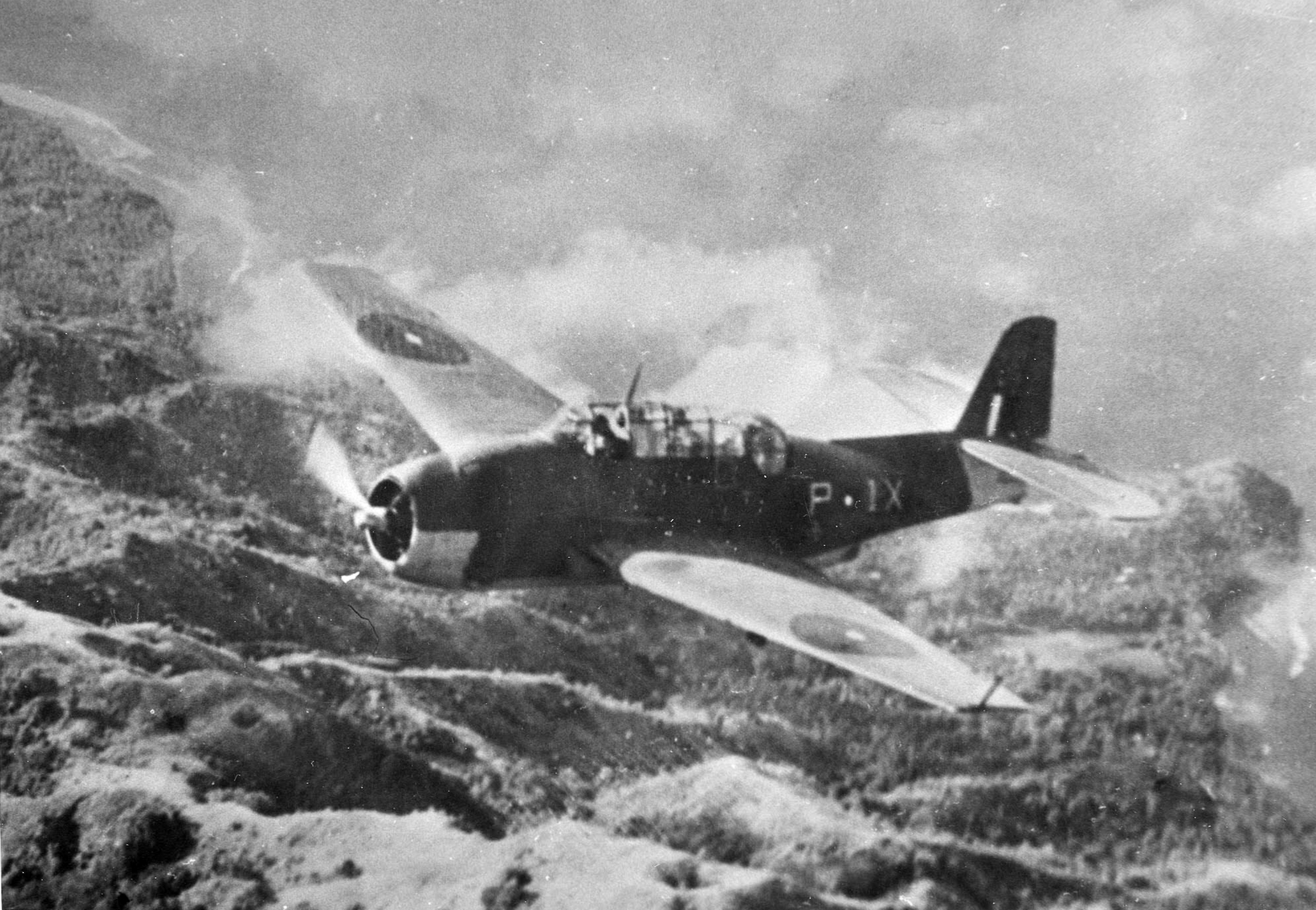
An 849 Squadron Avenger II from HMS Victorious (R38), 1944

Tarpon GR.I
RN designation of the TBF-1, 400 delivered.
Avenger Mk.II
RN designation of the TBM-1/TBM-1C, 334 delivered.
Avenger Mk.III
RN designation of the TBM-3, 222 delivered
Avenger Mk.IV
RN designation of the TBM-3S, 70 cancelled
Avenger AS4
RN designation of the TBM-3E, delivered postwar with minimum modifications
Avenger AS5
RN designation of the TBM-3S, delivered postwar & fitted with British equipment
Avenger AS6
RN designation of the TBM-3S, fitted with British equipment including a centerline radome. A total of one hundred TBM-3E & TBM-3S were delivered to the Royal Navy in 1953.

=== Royal Canadian Navy Avengers ===
Avenger AS3
Modified by RCN for anti-submarine duty, dorsal gun turret removed, 98 built
Avenger AS3M
AS3 with magnetic anomaly detector boom added to rear fuselage
Avenger Mk.3W2
Similar to TBM-3W, with large ventral radome. 8 operated.

== Operators ==
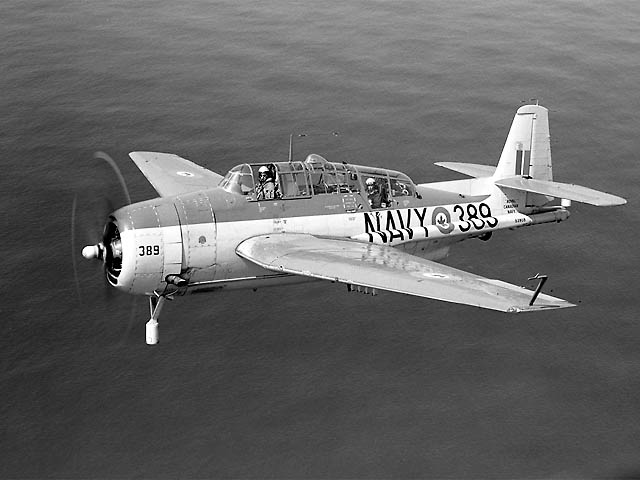
Canadian Avenger AS3M with long tubular magnetic anomaly detector (MAD) boom along the portside lower rear fuselage

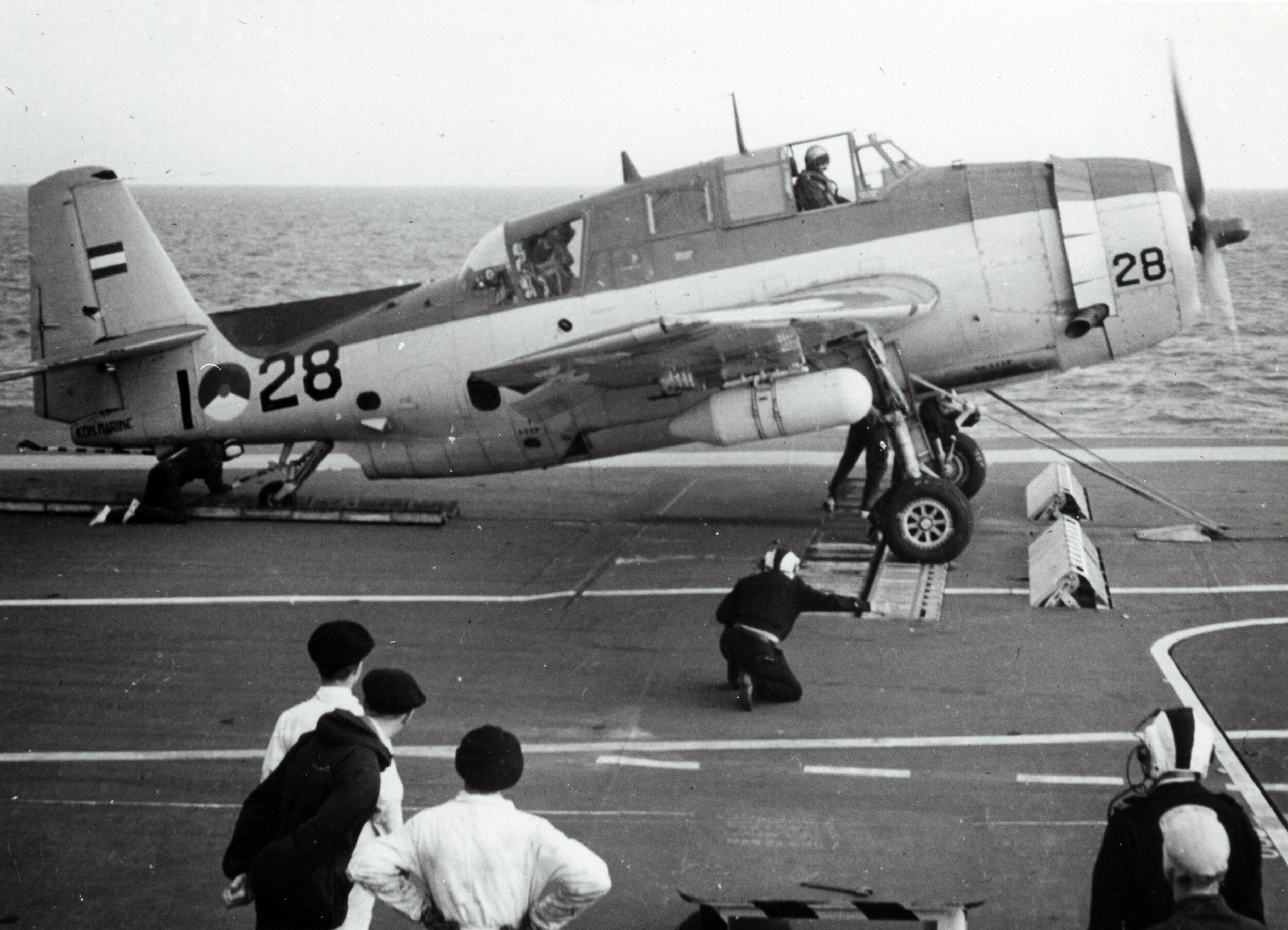
Royal Netherlands Navy TBM-3S2 anti-submarine attack variant used on aircraft carrier Karel Doorman between 1955-1960.

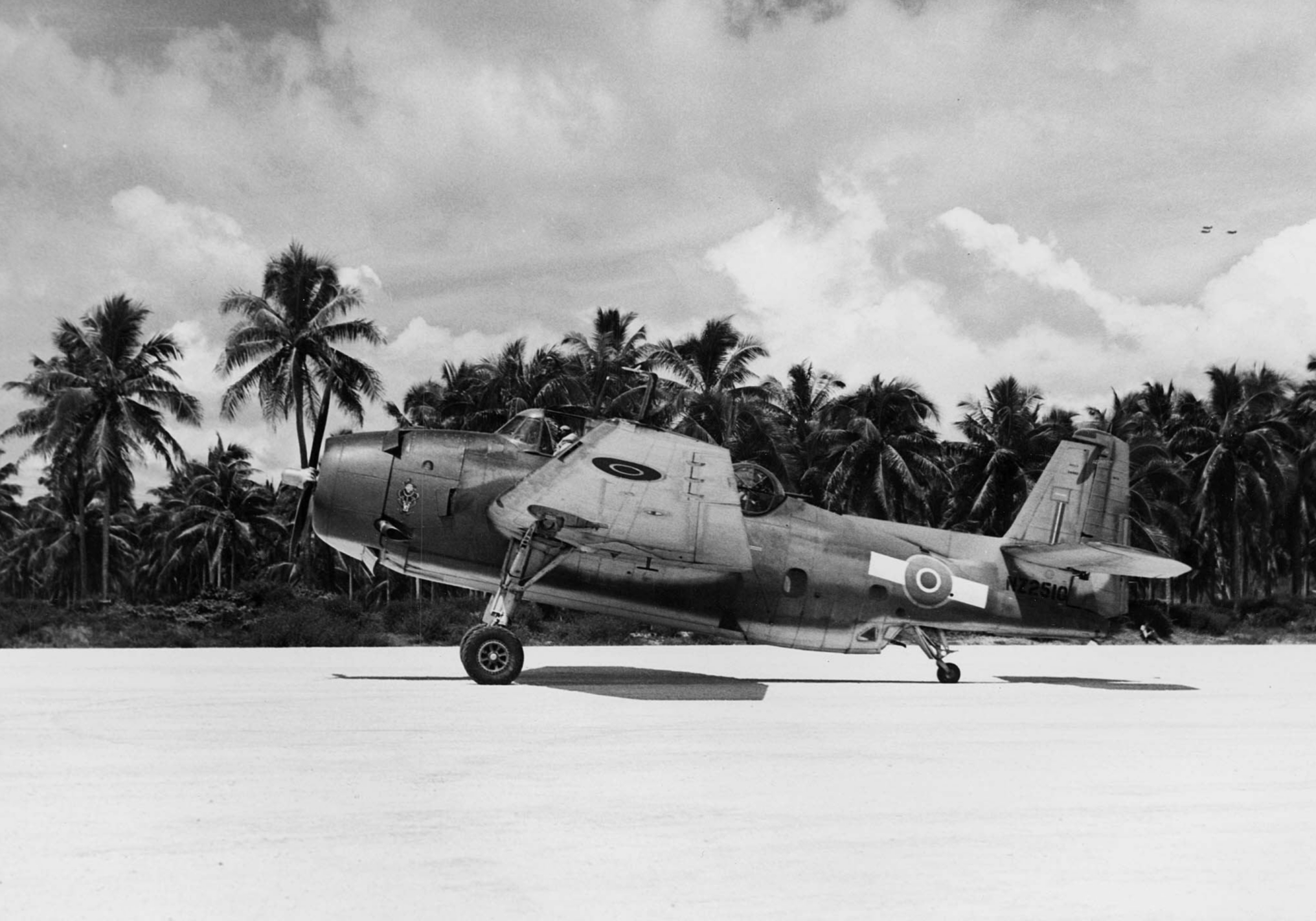
A No. 30 Squadron RNZAF TBF-1C on Espiritu Santo, 1944

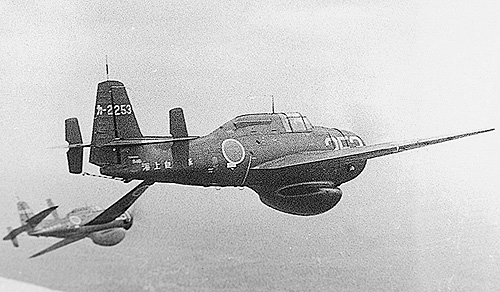
Japan Maritime Self-Defense Force TBM-3W

Brazil

- Brazilian Navy operated three Avengers in the 1950s for deck crew training aboard the carrier Minas Gerais (A-11).

Canada

- Royal Canadian Navy operated Avengers until replaced by the CS2F Tracker in 1960.
  - 880_Naval_Air_Squadron#Royal_Canadian_Navy later VS-880
  - 826_Naval_Air_Squadron#Royal_Canadian_Navy later VS-881
  - 881_Naval_Air_Squadron later VS-881

Cuba

- Cuban Navy received 7 TBM-3S2 in 1956; however, they were out of service by 1960.

France

- Aéronavale operated Avengers in the 1950s.

Japan

- Japan Maritime Self-Defense Force operated Hunter-Killer Avengers groups in the 1950s and 1960s.

Netherlands

- Royal Netherlands Navy – the Dutch Naval Aviation Service operated Avengers during the 1950s.

New Zealand

- Royal New Zealand Air Force
  - No. 30 Squadron RNZAF
  - No. 31 Squadron RNZAF
  - No. 41 Squadron RNZAF
  - No. 42 Squadron RNZAF
  - Central Fighter Establishment

Nicaragua

- Nicaraguan Air Force

United Kingdom

- Royal Navy – Fleet Air Arm
  - 700 Naval Air Squadron
  - 703 Naval Air Squadron
  - 706 Naval Air Squadron
  - 711 Naval Air Squadron
  - 733 Naval Air Squadron
  - 736 Naval Air Squadron
  - 738 Naval Air Squadron
  - 744 Naval Air Squadron
  - 751 Naval Air Squadron
  - 756 Naval Air Squadron
  - 763 Naval Air Squadron
  - 764 Naval Air Squadron
  - 768 Naval Air Squadron
  - 774 Naval Air Squadron
  - 778 Naval Air Squadron
  - 782 Naval Air Squadron
  - 783 Naval Air Squadron
  - 785 Naval Air Squadron
  - 787 Naval Air Squadron
  - 797 Naval Air Squadron
  - 798 Naval Air Squadron
  - 820 Naval Air Squadron
  - 828 Naval Air Squadron
  - 832 Naval Air Squadron
  - 845 Naval Air Squadron
  - 846 Naval Air Squadron
  - 848 Naval Air Squadron
  - 849 Naval Air Squadron
  - 850 Naval Air Squadron
  - 851 Naval Air Squadron
  - 852 Naval Air Squadron
  - 853 Naval Air Squadron
  - 854 Naval Air Squadron
  - 855 Naval Air Squadron
  - 856 Naval Air Squadron
  - 857 Naval Air Squadron

United States

- United States Navy
- United States Marine Corps

Uruguay

- Uruguayan Navy operated 16 TBF Avengers in the 1949 to 1963.

== Notable incidents ==
- A famous incident involving the TBM / TBF Avenger aircraft was the disappearance of Flight 19, a training flight of five Avengers that originated from Naval Air Station Fort Lauderdale and was lost in December 1945 over the Bermuda Triangle.
- During an airshow on 17 April 2021, TBM #91188 carried out a successful ditching south of Cocoa Beach, Florida near Patrick Space Force Base, in shallow surf. Valiant Air Command, the group that owns the plane, recovered the TBM for transport to Titusville, Florida to undergo extensive repairs. In 2022, the aircraft was sold before repairs were completed, due to rising costs.

== Specifications (TBF Avenger) ==
Grumman TBF-1 Avenger drawing

Data from Jane's Fighting aircraft of World War II Armament data from Flight Journal.com

General characteristics

- Crew: 3
- Length: 40 ft 1/8 in (12.195 m)
- Wingspan: 54 ft 2 in (16.51 m)
- Width: 19 ft (5.8 m) folded
- Height: 16 ft 5 in (5.00 m)
- Wing area: 490 sq ft (46 m^{2})
- Airfoil: root: NACA 23015; tip: NACA 23009
- Gross weight: 15,536 lb (7,047 kg)
- Fuel capacity: Fuel 330 US gal (275 imp gal; 1,249 L) in three center-section integral tanks + 2x 58 US gal (48 imp gal; 220 L) droppable slipper tanks under outer wings, with provision for a jettisonable 275 US gal (229 imp gal; 1,041 L) bomb-bay ferry tank.; Oil 32 US gal (27 imp gal; 121 L)
- Powerplant: 1 × Wright R-2600-8 Twin Cyclone 14-cylinder air-cooled radial piston engine, 1,700 hp (1,300 kW)
- Propellers: 3-bladed Hamilton Standard constant-speed propeller

Performance

- Maximum speed: 278 mph (447 km/h, 242 kn)
- Cruise speed: 215 mph (346 km/h, 187 kn)
- Range: 905 mi (1,456 km, 786 nmi) at cruise speed
- Service ceiling: 22,600 ft (6,900 m)
- Rate of climb: 1,075 ft/min (5.46 m/s)
- Power/mass: 0.11 hp/lb (0.18 kW/kg)

Armament

- Guns:
  - 1 × 0.30 in (7.62 mm) nose-mounted M1919 Browning machine gun (on early models) or 2 × 0.50 in (12.7 mm) wing-mounted M2 Browning machine guns
  - 1 × 0.50 in (12.7 mm) dorsal-mounted M2 Browning machine gun
  - 1 × 0.30 in (7.62 mm) ventral-mounted M1919 Browning machine gun
- Rockets:
  - up to eight 3.5-Inch (89 mm) Forward Firing Aircraft Rockets, 5-inch (127 mm) Forward Firing Aircraft Rockets or High Velocity Aerial Rockets
- Bombs:
  - Up to 2,000 lb (907 kg) of bombs (could consist of 4×500 lb bombs)or
  - 1 × 2,000 lb (907 kg) Mark 13 torpedo or Mark 24 mine (Fido) acoustic homing torpedo

== See also ==
Aircraft of comparable role, configuration, and era

- Aichi B7A Ryusei
- Consolidated TBY Sea Wolf
- Douglas TBD Devastator
- Douglas XTB2D Skypirate
- Fairey Barracuda
- Fairey Spearfish
- Nakajima B5N
- Nakajima B6N Tenzan
- Saab 17

Related lists

- List of aircraft of World War II
- List of United States Navy aircraft designations (pre-1962)
- List of military aircraft of the United States
- List of military electronics of the United States
