= Naval Air Station Fort Lauderdale =

Artfield of US

Coordinates: 26.0717°N 80.1511°W

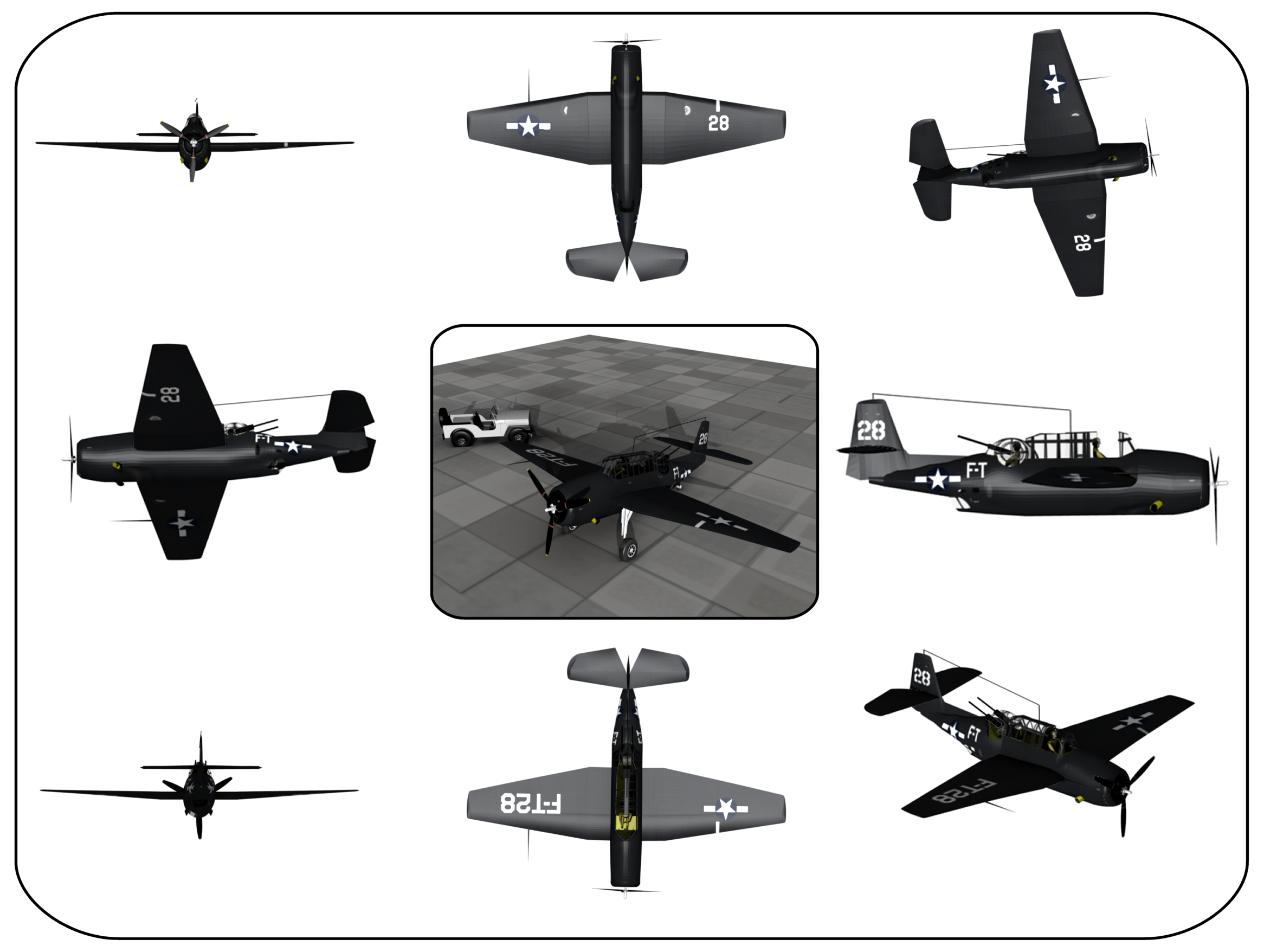
NAS Ft. Lauderdale training squadron markings of FT-28, Taylor's Avenger

Naval Air Station Fort Lauderdale was an airfield of the United States Navy just outside Fort Lauderdale, Florida.

In 1942, the U.S. Navy selected Merle Fogg Airport in Fort Lauderdale to expand into a naval air station for both pilot and enlisted aircrew training (i.e., gunners, radiomen) in Grumman TBF Avenger torpedo bombers flown by carrier-based US Navy flight crews and by land-based US Marine Corps flight crews ashore. Additional facilities were used to train aircraft maintenance and other ground crew support for the TBF and TBM series aircraft. Among the Avenger pilots who graduated NAS Fort Lauderdale was former president George H. W. Bush, from a class in 1943.

Several airfields in the immediate vicinity of NAS Fort Lauderdale were commissioned as Navy satellite airfields, also known as Naval outlying landing fields (NOLF). Several of these fields continue in operation today as civilian airports, such as Fort Lauderdale Executive Airport and North Perry Airport.

TBF /TBM training was difficult and dangerous. From 1942 through 1946, 94 trainees lost their lives while serving at NAS Fort Lauderdale. Fourteen of those men made up a five-aircraft flight, now known as Flight 19, that disappeared while on a routine training mission on December 5, 1945. The need to train Avenger crews having passed, the station was decommissioned after 1946 and the facility was conveyed to the government of Broward County, Florida for use as a civilian airport. Today the facility is known as Fort Lauderdale-Hollywood International Airport.

The NASFL also houses one of the last Link Trainers the Navy used in WW2 to train pilots how to fly.
