= John Thomas =

John Thomas is the name of:

== Politics ==
=== United Kingdom ===
- John Thomas (c. 1490–1540/42), British member of parliament for Truro
- John Thomas (c. 1531–1581/90), British member of parliament for Mitchell
- John Thomas (British politician) (1897–1968), British member of parliament for Dover
- John Thomas (Welsh politician) (1852–?), Welsh county councillor and miners' agent
- John Thomas, Baron Thomas of Cwmgiedd (born 1947), British judge
- Sir John Thomas, 1st Baronet, sheriff of Glamorgan in 1700
- John Aeron Thomas (1850–1935), British member of parliament for Gower, 1900–1906
- John Stradling Thomas (1925–1991), Welsh Conservative Party politician

=== United States ===
- Elmer Thomas (John William Elmer Thomas, 1876–1965), U.S. senator from Oklahoma
- J. Parnell Thomas (1895–1970), U.S. congressman from New Jersey
- John Thomas (Idaho politician) (1874–1945), U.S. senator from Idaho
- John Thomas (New York politician) (1792–1866)
- John Thomas (Ohio politician) (1857–1936)
- John Addison Thomas (1811–1858), U.S. assistant secretary of state
- John B. Thomas (politician) (1819–1893), American politician and judge from Maryland
- John Charles Thomas (judge) (born 1950), Virginia supreme court justice
- John Chew Thomas (1764–1836), U.S. congressman from Maryland
- John E. Thomas (politician) (1829–1910), Wisconsin state assemblyman and senator
- John J. Thomas (1813–1895), Confederate politician
- John Lewis Thomas Jr. (1835–1893), U.S. congressman from Maryland
- John M. Thomas (1926–2012), U.S. Assistant Secretary of State in the 1970s
- John O. Thomas (1867–1961), Wisconsin state assemblyman
- John R. Thomas (1846–1914), U.S. congressman from Illinois
- John W. Thomas (sheriff) (1815–1888), sheriff of Norfolk County, Massachusetts
- John W. Thomas (Wisconsin politician) (1846–1925), Wisconsin state legislator and railroad commissioner
- John W. E. Thomas (1847–1899), American businessman, educator, and Illinois politician
- John Warwick Thomas (1800–1871), North Carolina state legislator and founder of Thomasville, North Carolina
- John Webb Thomas (1873–1941), American politician from Maryland

== Military ==
- John Thomas (American general) (1724–1776), American general in the American Revolutionary War
- John Thomas (colonel) (1720–1811), American colonel in the American Revolutionary War
- John Thomas (VC) (1886–1954), English soldier and recipient of the Victoria Cross
- John Wallace Thomas (1888–1965), Newfoundland and Canadian merchant mariner who served in First and Second World Wars
- John Wellesley Thomas (1822–1908), British military officer

== Religion and theology ==
- Jack Thomas (bishop) (John James Absalom Thomas; 1908–1995), bishop of Swansea and Brecon
- John Thomas (Christadelphian) (1805–1871), British Christian theologian, and founder of the Christadelphians
- John Thomas (bishop of Rochester) (1712–1793), previously dean of Westminster
- John Thomas (bishop of Salisbury) (1691–1766), previously bishop of St Asaph, and of Lincoln
- John Thomas (bishop of Winchester) (1696–1781), previously bishop of Salisbury
- John Thomas (priest, born 1736) (1736–1769), Welsh Anglican priest and antiquarian
- John Thomas (priest, born 1891) (1891–1959), Welsh Anglican priest
- John Christopher Thomas (born c. 1955), American Pentecostal theologian
- John H. Thomas (born c. 1950), American clergyman, general minister and president of the United Church of Christ, 1999–2009
- John Lloyd Thomas (1908–1984), Anglican clergyman

== Sport ==
- John Thomas (American football, born 1935), American football player for the San Francisco 49ers
- John Thomas (American football, born 1953), American football player drafted by the New York Giants
- John Thomas (athlete) (1941–2013), American high jumper
- John Thomas (Australian cricketer) (1852–1915), cricketer for Tasmania
- John Thomas (Australian footballer) (1935–2011), Australian rules footballer for Geelong
- John Thomas (baseball), American baseball player
- John Thomas (basketball) (born 1975), American basketball player
- John Thomas (English cricketer) (1879–1949), cricketer for Somerset
- John Thomas (figure skater) (born 1960), Canadian ice dancer
- John Thomas (footballer, born 1958), English footballer for Preston North End and Bolton Wanderers
- John Thomas (ice hockey) (1936–1995), Australian ice hockey player
- John Thomas (Irish footballer), Irish international footballer
- John Thomas (lacrosse) (born 1952), American lacrosse player
- John Thomas (Welsh footballer) (died 1920), Welsh footballer for Sheffield United and Gainsborough Trinity in the 1890s
- John Webster Thomas (1900–1977), American college football player for the Chicago Maroons
- Ron Thomas (bowls) (John Ronald Thomas), Welsh international lawn and indoor bowler

== Music ==
- John Thomas (harpist) (1826–1913), Welsh composer and musician
- "Big" John Thomas (1952–2016), British lead guitarist with Budgie
- John Charles Thomas (1891–1960), American baritone opera singer
- John Rogers Thomas (1830–1896), American composer
- John Weston Thomas (1921–1992), Welsh harpmaker

== Art ==
- John Thomas (sculptor) (1813–1862), British sculptor who worked on British palaces
- John Evan Thomas (1810–1873), Welsh sculptor
- John Paul Thomas (1927–2001), American artist, principally in Hawaii

== Film ==
- John Thomas (cinematographer), winner of the 1995 Independent Spirit Award for Best Cinematography
- John Thomas (screenwriter) (fl. late 20th century), co-screenwriter for the movie Predator
- John G. Thomas (born 1948), American filmmaker

== Education ==
- John Hunter Thomas (1928–1999), American botanist
- John L. Thomas (c. 1927–2005), American historian
- John Martin Thomas (1869–1952), Twelfth president of Rutgers University
- John Peyre Thomas Sr. (1833–1912), South Carolina educator, politician and historian
- John R. Thomas (professor), American intellectual property professor

== Other areas ==
- John Thomas (fur trader) (c. 1751–1822), Canadian fur trader
- John Thomas Idlet (1931–2002), American Beat poet
- John Thomas (photographer) (1838–1905), Welsh photographer
- John B. Thomas (1925–2018), American electrical engineer, educator and professor
- John E. Thomas (1926–1996), Canadian philosopher
- John Floyd Thomas Jr. (born 1936), Californian murderer
- John Henry Thomas (1854–1928), Australian composer, editor, and conductor
- John Henry Thomas (shipping) (1869–1931), American shipping business and port director
- John Henry Malamah Thomas, Sierra Leonean entrepreneur and mayor of Freetown, Sierra Leone
- John Hudson Thomas (1878–1945), American architect
- John Jacob Thomas (1841–1889), Trinidadian linguist and writer
- John Meurig Thomas (1932–2020), British chemist and materials scientist
- John P. Thomas (1886–1944), American architect
- John Rochester Thomas (1848–1901), American architect

== See also ==
- Jack Thomas (disambiguation)
- Johnny Thomas (disambiguation)
- John Thomas sign, a slang or joke term in radiology
- John Thomas and Lady Jane, a 1927 novel by D. H. Lawrence
