= Daniel White =

Daniel, Dan, or Danny White may refer to:

== Sports ==
- Dan White (quarterback) (born 1972), football quarterback for the University of Arizona Wildcats
- Dan White (rugby union) (born 1989), rugby union player
- Danny White (born 1952), former football quarterback with the Dallas Cowboys
- Danny White (athletic director) (born c. 1980), university athletic director

== Politics ==
- Dan White (1946–1985), San Francisco politician, assassin
- Dan White (Ohio politician), former Ohio House of Representatives member
- Daniel Appleton White (1776–1861), American statesman, lawyer, and judge
- Daniel Price White (1814–1890), Confederate politician

== Others ==
- Dan White (actor) (1908–1980), American actor in westerns
- Dan White (magician) (born 1981), American magician
- Dan White (saxophonist), American musician and member of Huntertones
- Daniel White (general) (1833–1895), Union general in the American Civil War from the state of Maine
- Daniel R. White (born 1953), American lawyer, writer, editor, humorist
- Danny White (musician), British keyboardist
- Danny White (New Orleans musician) (1931–1996), R&B singer and bandleader
- Daniel White (YouTuber), creator of danooct1, a YouTube channel dedicated to computer viruses

== See also ==
- Daniel Whyte (disambiguation)
