= List of signers of the Florida Ordinance of Secession =

Florida's Ordinance of Secession was adopted at the Florida Secession Convention on January 10, 1861, officially withdrawing the state's membership from the United States. The convention was led by John C. McGehee, a wealthy planter who served as the Judge of Madison County. A secretary, William S. Harris (Duval County), and two assistant secretaries, A.T. Banks and E.W. Rogers, were appointed. The convention included delegates from 32 out of the 37 counties in the state, as Hillsborough, Hernando, Liberty, Manatee, and Bradford Counties were not included. Delegates were also sent from the 4th, 5th, 7th, 16th, 17th, 19th, and 20th Senatorial Districts.

== List ==
Delegate	County/District	Notes
A.W. Nicholson	Escambia	Tax Collector of Escambia County.
S.H. Wright	Escambia	
R.D. Jordan	Holmes	
Adam McNealy	Jackson	
Thomas Y. Henry	Gadsden	Surgeon; former Grandmaster of the Florida Lodge of Masons. Grandson of Patrick Henry.
E.C. Love	Gadsden	Owner and namesake of the E.C. Love House.
A.J. Lea	Madison	
W.H. Sever	Taylor	
E.P. Barronton	Lafayette	
Joseph Finegan	Nassau	Confederate Brigadier General; appointed teller by the convention.
James G. Cooper	Nassau	
James H. Chandler	Volusia	Methodist minister.
David G. Leigh	Sumter	
James Gettis	20th Senatorial District	
S.S. Alderman	Jackson	
Alexander L. McCaskill	Walton	
William S. Harris	Duval	Appointed secretary by the convention.
S.J. Baker	Calhoun	Brother of Jackson County delegate James L.G. Baker.
S.B. Stephens	7th Senatorial District	
Freeman B. Irwin	Washington	Died in the Elmira Prison Camp.
McQueen McIntosh	5th Senatorial District	
Samuel W. Spencer	Franklin	
D.D. McLean	4th Senatorial District	
Lewis A. Folsom	Hamilton	
Green H. Hunter	Columbia	
James A. Newman	Suwannee	
Arthur J.T. Wright	Columbia	Lawyer; Lieutenant Colonel in the Confederate Army.
Isaac S. Coon	New River (Dade)	
John J. Lamb	Clay	
Isaac N. Rutland	19th Senatorial District	One of seven to vote against secession.
William Pinkney	Monroe	
Winer Bethel	Monroe	Mayor of Key West (1872–73).
Joseph A. Collier	Jackson	
John C. McGehee	Madison	Appointed president by the convention.
Jackson Morton	Santa Rosa	U.S. Senator from Florida (1849–1855).
E.E. Simpson	Santa Rosa	Co-owner of Arcadia Mill.
Daniel Ladd	Wakulla	
David Lewis	Wakulla	
Thompson B. Lamar	Jefferson	Confederate Colonel; brother of Confederate Secretary of State and U.S. Supreme Court Justice Lucius Q.C. Lamar and father of Congressman William Bailey Lamar. Killed by a Union sniper.
J. Patton Anderson	Jefferson	Confederate Major General; U.S. Congressman from Washington.
Thomas M. Palmer	Jefferson	
William S. Dilworth	Jefferson	
J.M. Daniel	Duval	
T.J. Hendricks	Clay	
J.P. Sanderson	16th Senatorial District	President of the Florida, Atlantic, and Gulf Central Railroad and vice president of the Jacksonville, Pensacola, and Mobile Railroad
James B. Owens	Marion	Baptist minister.
Summerfield M.G. Gary	Marion	Brother of Martin Witherspoon Gary and brother-in-law of Nathan George Evans.
W. McGahagin	Marion	
Asa F. Tift	Monroe	Prominent Key West salvager; built the Ernest Hemingway House.
James L.G. Baker	Jackson	Brother of Calhoun County delegate S.J. Baker.
Abraham K. Allison	Gadsden	6th Governor of Florida from April to May 1865. Also mayor of Apalachicola and Franklin County judge.
John Beard	Leon	Florida State Comptroller; appointed teller by the convention.
James Kirksey	Leon	Mayor of Tallahassee and owner of the James Kirksey Plantation.
G.W. Parkhill	Leon	Confederate Captain; died in the Battle of Gaines' Mill.
George T. Ward	Leon	Confederate Colonel; Whig candidate for Florida Governor in 1852. Killed in the Battle of Williamsburg.
W.G.M. Davis	Leon	Confederate Brigadier General.
Joseph Thomas	Hamilton	
Matthew Solana	St. Johns	
James O. Devall	Putnam	
R.G. Mays	17th Senatorial District	
John C. Pelot	Alachua	Chairman of the Convention.
James B. Dawkins	Alachua	
William W. Woodruff	Orange	
W.B. Yates	Brevard	
John Morrison	Walton	One of seven to vote against secession.
