= 35th Mississippi Infantry Regiment =

19th century confederate infantry unit from Mississippi

- Active: 1862–1865
- Disbanded: April 9, 1865
- Country: Confederate States
- Allegiance: Mississippi
- Branch: Confederate States Army
- Type: Infantry
- Size: Regiment
- Battles: American Civil War: Second Battle of Corinth; Vicksburg Campaign; Atlanta Campaign; Franklin-Nashville Campaign; Battle of Fort Blakeley

Commanders
- Notable commanders: William S. Barry

The 35th Mississippi Infantry Regiment was a unit of the Confederate States Army in the American Civil War. Formed in 1862, the regiment fought in many major battles of the Western theater. After being captured at Vicksburg in 1863 and taking heavy losses during battles in 1864, the regiment surrendered at Fort Blakeley, Alabama in April 1865.

== History ==
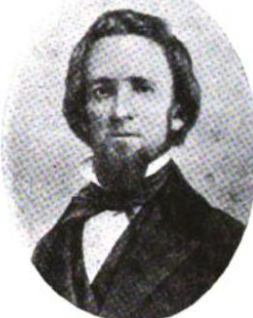
Colonel William S. Barry of the 35th Mississippi.

The 35th Mississippi Infantry was organized at West Point, Mississippi in March, 1862. The colonel of the regiment was William S. Barry, who had served as president of the Mississippi Secession Convention in January 1861 and as a deputy to the Provisional Congress of the Confederate States. Assigned to General Dabney H. Maury's division of the Army of West Tennessee, the first major action of the 35th Mississippi was Second Battle of Corinth in October 1862, where the Confederates attempted unsuccessfully to assault Union fortifications at a strategic railroad junction in North Mississippi. During this battle and the subsequent Battle of Hatchie Bridge fought on October 5, the regiment reported 32 killed, 110 wounded, and 347 missing. According to the brigade commander, General John Creed Moore, "we are assured that many of the [missing] officers and men have gone to their homes. This conduct on their part is astonishing and unaccountable, for the regiment acted nobly and did good service during the three days' fighting."

During the 1863 Vicksburg Campaign, the regiment clashed with Union General Ulysses S. Grant's forces as he sought to capture the strategic city of Vicksburg along the Mississippi River. In May the regiment was moved within the city's defensive lines and withstood Union assaults on the fortifications during the six-week Siege of Vicksburg. On July 4 the Confederate garrison surrendered, over the course of the siege the 35th Mississippi lost 20 killed and 82 wounded. The regiment was exchanged and reorganized in November at Columbus, Mississippi, and was assigned to defensive duties in Georgia, Alabama, and Mississippi before joining the Atlanta Campaign in the spring of 1864. The 35th was part of the brigade of General Claudius W. Sears, after he was wounded Colonel Barry of the 35th commanded Sears' brigade for the remainder of the campaign. The regiment fought at Cassville, New Hope Church, Kennesaw Mountain, Peachtree Creek, Atlanta, and Lovejoy's Station, losing 20 killed, 90 wounded, and 70 missing over the course of the campaign.

During the October 1864 Battle of Allatoona, the regiment took further losses during an unsuccessful assault on fortified Union positions, losing its regimental flag and suffering losses of 12 killed, 52 wounded, and 83 missing. Similarly at the Battle of Franklin in November, another failed assault on Union positions led to heavy Confederate losses. Later in the Franklin-Nashville Campaign, the regiment fought at Murfreesboro and Nashville before retreating to Mississippi at the end of the year.

In early 1865 the remnants of the 35th Mississippi were sent to guard the forts around Mobile Bay, and the regiment was captured at the Battle of Fort Blakeley on April 9. This battle, the last major action in the Gulf Coast region, occurred on the same day as General Robert E. Lee's surrender in Virginia.

== Commanders ==
Commanders of the 35th Mississippi Infantry:

- Colonel William S. Barry, wounded at Allatoona, 1864.
- Lieutenant Colonel Charles R. Jordan
- Lieutenant Colonel Reuben H. Shotwell

== See also ==
- List of Mississippi Civil War Confederate units
