= Beyond Baroque Literary Arts Center =

Literary arts center in Los Angeles

Coordinates: 33°59′28″N 118°27′31″W

Beyond Baroque Literary Arts Center is a literary arts center located at 681 Venice Boulevard, Venice, Los Angeles, California, founded in 1968. The center is based near the beach in Los Angeles's old Venice City Hall, built in 1906. It offers an extensive program of public readings, workshops, a project room, bookstore, publications, and chapbook/small press archive.

== History ==
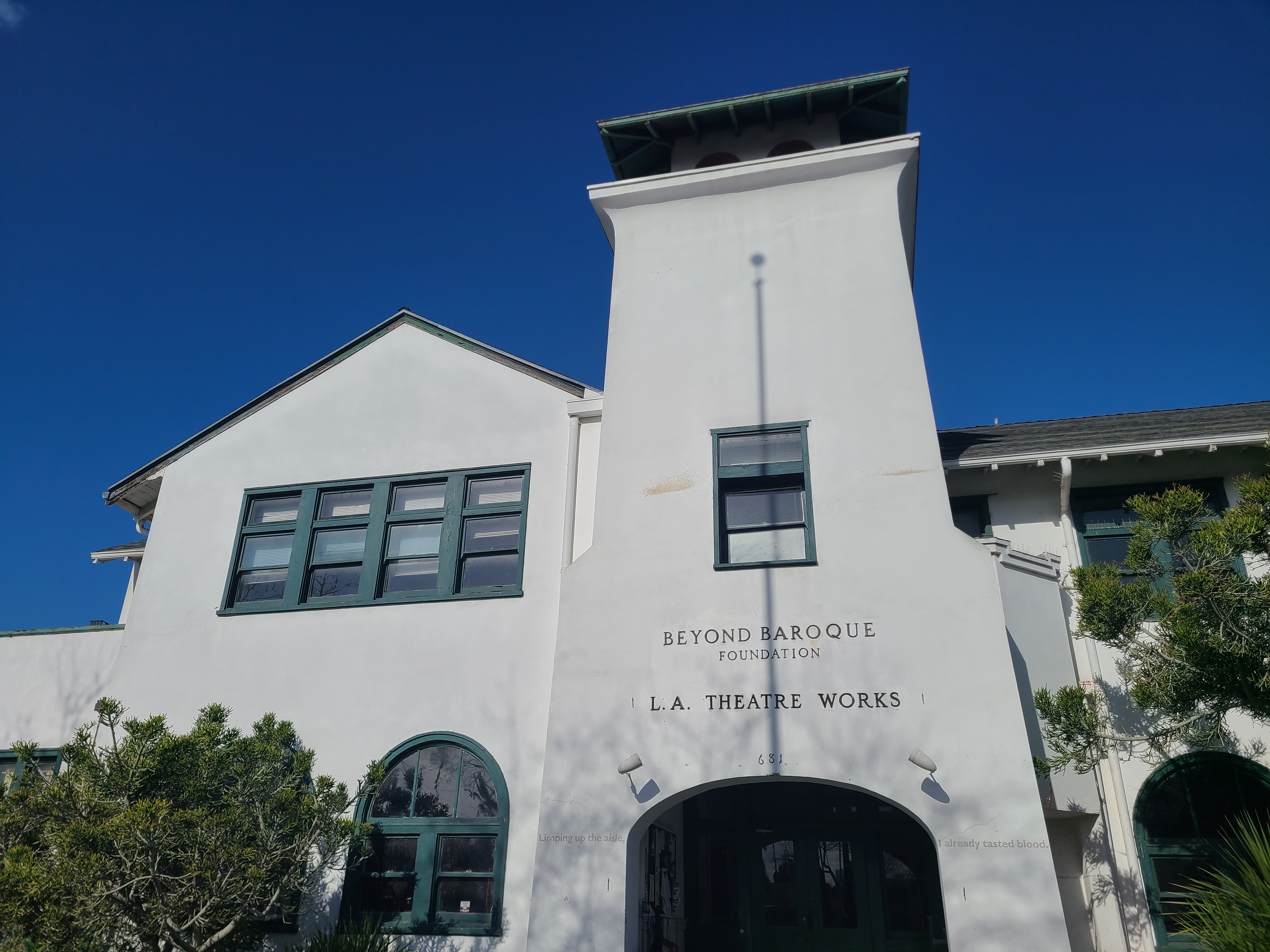
Beyond Baroque building in February 2023

George Drury Smith started publishing the magazine Beyond Baroque in 1968 from a storefront in Venice, which became a meeting place with workshops and space for readings, art, and music. Although 10,000 copies of the first issue were printed offset, subsequent issues were printed in-house using a four-color process. Later the magazines were printed on bound newsprint and distributed free. Over the years, the workshops have been attended by numerous well-known Los Angeles writers and poets, including founders Joseph Hansen and John Harris, Leland Hickman, Bob Flanagan, John Thomas, Will Alexander, Philomene Long, and Simone Forti. The center's first librarian was Exene Cervenka of the band X, who formed after Cervenka and John Doe met at the Wednesday Night Poetry Workshop. Some of LA artist Mike Kelley's first performances were at the center, and the cover of one of the early issues of Beyond Baroque, featuring several experimental filmmakers, was displayed in the Pompidou's 2006 show on Los Angeles art. The center's reading series, featuring over 200 writers a year, has featured writers including Amanda Gorman John Ashbery, Amiri Baraka, Raymond Carver, Jerry Casale of Devo, Wanda Coleman, Ed Dorn, Allen Ginsberg, Leland Hickman, Philip Levine, Lewis MacAdams, Viggo Mortensen, Harry Northup, Alice Notley, Graeme Revell from the band SPK, Patti Smith, James Tate, V Vale, who formed a tabloid format zine focusing on various counterculture and underground topics named RE/Search Publications documenting punk subculture, and CK Williams.

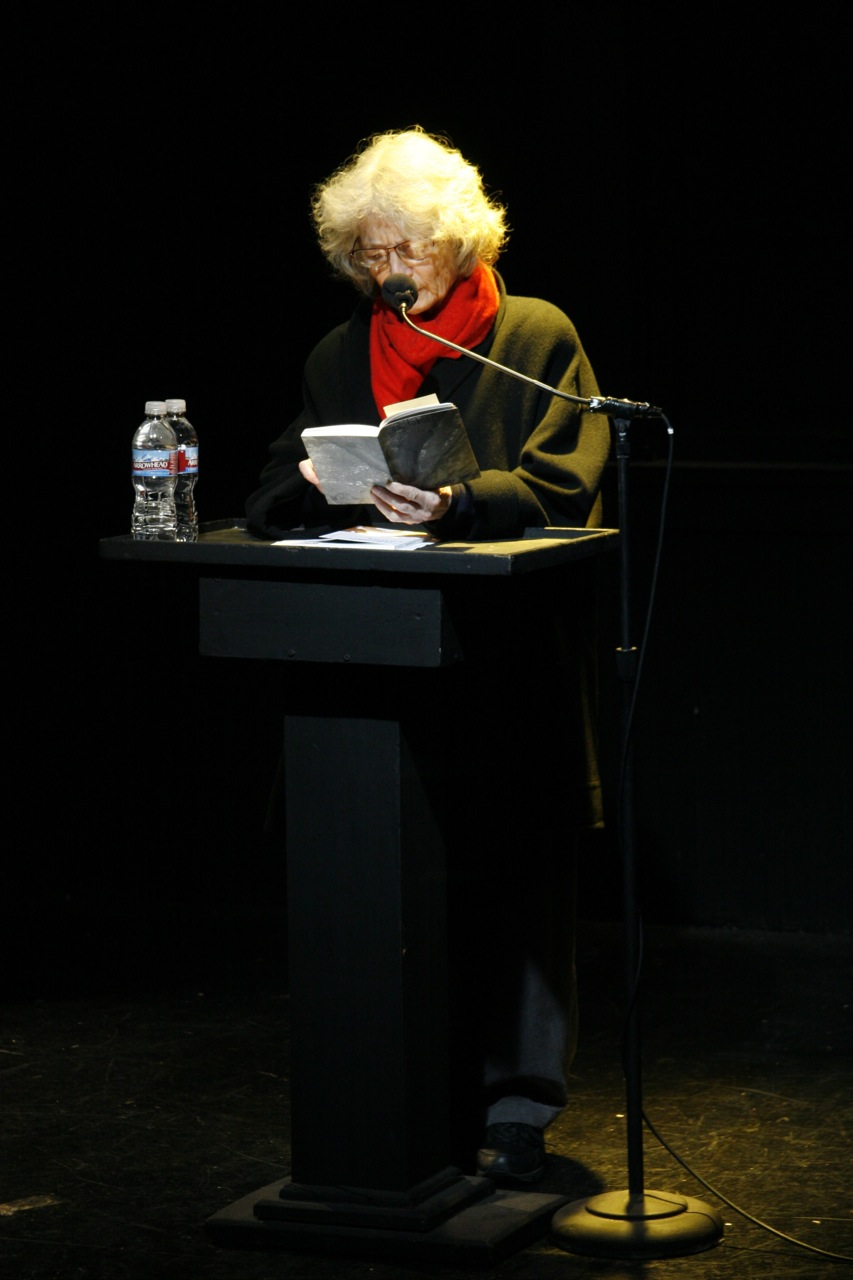
Simone Forti at Beyond Baroque

Beyond Baroque archives and sells chapbooks, small press poetry and experimental fiction. Center series include experimental music, film screenings, and visual art, including the Les Femmes Underground International Film Festival. Other festivals organized by Beyond Baroque include World Beyond Festival (with the World Stage and other local organizations) and the Beyond Text Festival (with LACMA and others). Its annual event with the LA Poetry Festival, the Younger Poets, presents undiscovered poets from the Los Angeles region at the Downtown Central Library. The center has also curated and organized permanent public art projects highlighting Los Angeles poets, including the Poetry Walls on the Venice Boardwalk and the lobby of the Junípero Serra State Office Building downtown.

Since Smith, an experimental fiction writer, founded the center in 1968, the center's staff and board has typically included writers and artists. Beyond Baroque's first artistic director and the founder of its reading series was the novelist Jim Krusoe, a role subsequently occupied by Dennis Cooper. Fiction writer Benjamin Weissman brought the center's reading series new levels of acclaim as artistic director in the 1980s. Other artists and writer who have served on staff include Amy Gerstler, Tosh Berman, and Richard Modiano. Quentin Ring serves as the organization's current executive director.

== Publishing ==
In 1998, the center launched its own imprint, Beyond Baroque Books, dedicated to experimental and alternative writing and poetry in Los Angeles. Launched by Fred Dewey, the imprint has published 14 books, including works by Ammiel Alcalay, Simone Forti, and Philomene Long, as well as anthologies from the Wednesday Workshop, the World Stage, and several art and literature magazines.

Publications published at the center include Momentum Press, edited by Bill Mohr; Little Caesar, edited by programs curator Dennis Cooper; and a series edited by David Trinidad.
