= Senator Bradford (disambiguation) =

William Bradford (Rhode Island politician) (1729–1808) was a U.S. Senator from Rhode Island. Senator Bradford may refer to:

- Alexander Blackburn Bradford (1799–1873), Tennessee State Senate
- George W. Bradford (1796–1883), New York
- Jim Bradford (politician) (born 1933), South Dakota State Senate
- Steven Bradford (born 1960), California State Senate
