= Alexander M. Clayton =

American politician (1801–1889)

Alexander Mosby Clayton

Deputy from Mississippi to the Provisional Congress of the Confederate States
- In office February 4, 1861 – May 11, 1861
- Preceded by: New constituency
- Succeeded by: Alexander Bradford

Personal details
- Born: January 15, 1801 Campbell County, Virginia, U.S.
- Died: September 30, 1889 (aged 88) Benton County, Mississippi, U.S.
- Resting place: Hill Crest Cemetery, Holly Springs, Mississippi, U.S.

Alexander Mosby Clayton (January 15, 1801 – September 30, 1889) was an American politician and slaveowner who served as a justice of the Supreme Court of Mississippi from 1842 to 1852, and as a deputy from Mississippi to the Provisional Congress of the Confederate States from February to May 1861.

== Biography ==
Born in Campbell County, Virginia, to William Willis Clayton and Clarissa Mosby Clayton. He attended the local schools. After this he read law with a Lynchburg attorney in 1822 to gain admission to the bar in 1823. He migrated first to Arkansas Territory, where he was appointed in 1832 to serve as a Judge of the Superior Court, the highest court in the territory, and then to Mississippi, where he served as a state court judge from 1842 to 1852. From 1844 to 1852, he served as the first president of the University of Mississippi Board of Trustees. In May 1853, President Franklin Pierce appointed Clayton to serve as Consul to Havana, Cuba. An editorial in the Natchez Daily Courier condemned the appointment, asserting that Clayton had authored a secessionist address on behalf of a committee appointed by the legislature to respond to the Compromise of 1850, with the editorial describing Clayton as "a leader of the secession forces". Clayton nevertheless received the appointment; he resigned the following year, and was succeeded by Roger Barton in August 1854.

Clayton became a wealthy planter, holding 140 people as slaves by 1860. A fervent secessionist since 1850, Clayton was elected as a delegate to Mississippi's secession convention which took the state out of the Union in January, 1861. He was then selected to represent Mississippi in the Provisional Confederate States Congress from February to May, 1861. During his short time in Congress he served on the judiciary committee and was involved in the design of the Confederacy's judicial system. He resigned in May, 1861, and was appointed as a District Court Judge. After the war he again served as a state court judge from 1866 to 1869. He continued to practice law after leaving office and was a director of the Northern Bank of Mississippi and the Mississippi Central Railroad.

== Death ==
Clayton died on his farm near Lamar, Mississippi, at the age of 88. In his obituary, Clayton was described as "a leader at the bar of two States and at the time of his death [who] had practiced law longer than any other man in the country". A modern historian described him as "perhaps the most accomplished legal mind of the [1861 state secession] convention".

Political offices
Preceded by Reuben Davis	Justice of the Supreme Court of Mississippi; 1842–1852	Succeeded by Ephraim S. Fisher
New constituency	Deputy from Mississippi to the Provisional Congress of the Confederate States; 1861	Succeeded by Alexander Bradford
