= Jack Thomas =

Jack Thomas may refer to:

- Jack Thomas (academic), president of Western Illinois University
- Jack Thomas (bishop) (1908–1995), Welsh Anglican bishop
- Jack Thomas (footballer, born 1996), English footballer
- Jack Thomas (footballer, born 1890) (1890–1947), English footballer
- Jack Thomas (swimmer) (born 1995), British swimmer
- Jack W. Thomas (born 1930), American screenwriter and novelist
- Jack Ward Thomas (1934–2016), chief of the U.S. Forest Service
- Joseph T. Thomas (born 1973), known as Jack, Australian citizen whose conviction for receiving funds from Al-Qaeda was overturned on appeal
- John Thomas (lacrosse) (born 1952), known as Jack, American lacrosse player
- A. Jack Thomas (1884–1962), Baltimore-area conductor
- Jack Thomas (speedway rider) (born 1999), British speedway rider

== See also ==
- Jackie Thomas (disambiguation)
- John Thomas (disambiguation)
