= Samuel Ford =

Samuel Ford may refer to:

- Samuel Howard Ford (1819–1905), English-born Kentucky Confederate politician
- Samuel Ford (Maryland politician) (1832–1900), American politician from Maryland
- Samuel Clarence Ford (1882–1961), American politician, Governor of Montana

== See also ==
- Samuel Forde (1805–1828), Irish artist
