= Jackie Thomas =

Jackie Thomas may refer to:

- The Jackie Thomas Show, an American sitcom that aired on ABC from 1992 to 1993
- Jackie Thomas, Nike executive, former trustee of The Athenian School in California
- Jackie Thomas (singer) (born 1990), winner of the first series of The X Factor in New Zealand
  - Jackie Thomas (album), debut album by Jackie Thomas
- Jackie Lynn Thomas, a character in the television series Star vs. the Forces of Evil

== See also ==
- Jacqueline Thomas, victim in a high-profile UK murder investigation during the 1960s
- Jack Thomas (disambiguation)
- John Thomas (disambiguation)
