= William DeWitt =

William DeWitt may refer to:

- William DeWitt Jr. (born 1941), American businessman and chairman of the St. Louis Cardinals
- William Henry DeWitt (1827–1896), Tennessee politician
