= Joseph W. Matthews =

American politician

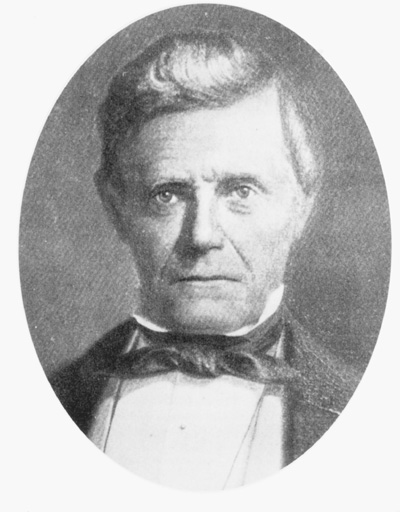

15th Governor of Mississippi
- In office January 10, 1848 – January 10, 1850
- Preceded by: Albert G. Brown
- Succeeded by: John A. Quitman

Personal details
- Born: 1812 Huntsville, Alabama, U.S.
- Died: August 27, 1862 (aged 49–50) Palmetto Georgia, U.S.
- Party: Democratic

Joseph Warren Matthews (1812 – August 27, 1862) was an American politician who served as Governor of Mississippi from 1848 to 1850.

== Biography ==
Matthews was born in 1812 near Huntsville, Alabama. During early adulthood, he came to Mississippi as a government surveyor, engaged in laying out the newly purchased Indian lands. Soon after the Chickasaw purchase, he relocated to Marshall County, Mississippi, near the now extinct town of Salem, to become a farmer. His plantation, which contained about 1,000 acres (4.0 km^{2}) actually touched the western boundary of the Chickasaw Cession. The southeast corner of Matthews' plantation is the northwest corner of the modern Village of Snow Lake. Although Matthews lived in Holly Springs in Marshall County, his plantation was located 11 miles (18 km) to the east, in what was then Tippah County. This portion of Tippah County was split to form a new county, Benton County.

In 1840, he was elected representative to the Mississippi legislature from Marshall County, and was a state senator from that county from 1844 to 1848. On June 7, 1847 the Democratic state convention nominated Matthews for governor on the third ballot by a majority of fifty-one of twenty-seven for the other candidates. Matthews won the 1847 gubernatorial election over the Whig candidate, Alexander Blackburn Bradford, also of Marshall County, by a vote of 26,985 to 13,997.

Mathews was a plain-spoken man, and was derided by the aristocratic Whigs for his humble beginnings. A surveyor, he worked for a time as a young man as a well digger, thus earning him the derisive nicknames "Jo the well digger" and "Old Copperas Britches."

During his administration, the state adopted a new legal code, established an institution for the blind, and the University of Mississippi opened for its first session in the fall of 1848. The Jackson-Brandon railroad also began operation, and telegraph service became available in Jackson and other parts of the state.

Matthews left office in 1850. In 1862, he accepted a commission in the Confederate army, but died in transit at Palmetto, Georgia on his way to Richmond, Virginia. There is a large monument to Matthews located in the Matthews family cemetery on his former plantation. This monument is in a wooded area approximately 1,000 feet (300 m) due north from the intersection of Hoover Road and Bonds Loop, and is not visible from the road. It was placed by the Sons of Confederate Veterans.

Party political offices
Preceded by Albert G. Brown	Democratic nominee for Governor of Mississippi; 1847	Succeeded by John A. Quitman
Political offices
Preceded by Albert G. Brown	Governor of Mississippi; 1848–1850	Succeeded by John A. Quitman
