= William Littleton Harris =

American judge

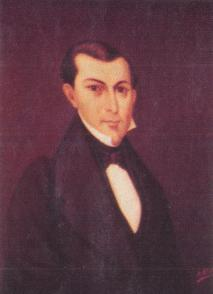
William L. Harris, Confederate

William Littleton Harris (1807–1868) was a Mississippi jurist.

== Early life ==
Born in Elbert County, Georgia, in 1807, Harris graduated from the University of Georgia at the age of fifteen, and read law to be admitted to the bar. His admission required an act of the legislature, due to his status as a minor. Harris moved to Mississippi in 1837 and lived in Lowndes County, where he successfully established a large legal practice.

== Career ==
Harris became as a circuit judge in 1853, and in 1856 helped write the Mississippi code of 1857.

In 1858 Harris was appointed by Governor John J. McRae to a seat on the Mississippi High Court of Errors and Appeals vacated by the resignation of Ephraim S. Fisher.

His best-known opinion was Mitchell v. Wells, decided in 1859. The case prohibited a formerly enslaved woman from inheriting from the estate of her white father.

In essence, it held that once someone was a slave in Mississippi she would always be considered a slave, even though her father (and owner) had taken her to Ohio and freed her. The case illustrates the extreme southern position; it illustrates the uncompromising nature of southern law on the eve of Civil War.

In 1860 President James Buchanan tendered him the appointment to a seat on the Supreme Court of the United States, but Harris declined "because of the impending secession".

== Civil War ==
Instead of taking a seat on the Supreme Court, Harris took a position as a commissioner to Georgia, in which he was appointed by Mississippi Governor, John J. Pettus.

=== Secession speech ===
On December 17, 1860, Harris delivered an address to the Georgia General Assembly, in Milledgeville, supporting secession:

"I am instructed by the resolution from which I derive my mission, to inform the State of Georgia, that Mississippi has passed an act calling a convention of her people, to consider the present threatening relations of the Northern and Southern sections of the Confederacy -- aggravated by the recent election of a President, upon principles of hostility to the States of the South; and to express the earnest hope of Mississippi, that this State will co-operate with her in the adoption of efficient measures for their common defence and safety.

It will be remembered, that the violation of our constitutional rights, which has caused such universal dissatisfaction in the South, is not of recent date. Ten years since, this Union was rocked from centre to circumference, by the very same outrages, of which we now complain, only now 'aggravated' by the recent election. Nothing but her devotion to the Union our Fathers made, induced the South, then, to yield to a compromise...The North pledged anew her faith to yield to us our constitutional rights in relation to slave property. They are now, and have been ever since that act, denied to us, until her broken faith and impudent threats, had become almost insufferable before the late election...

They have demanded, and now demand, equality between the white and negro races, under our Constitution; equality in representation, equality in the right of suffrage, equality in the honors and emoluments of office, equality in the social circle, equality in the rights of matrimony. The cry has been, and now is, 'that slavery must cease, or American liberty must perish,' that 'the success of Black Republicanism is the triumph of anti-slavery,' 'a revolution in the tendencies of the government that must be carried out...

Our fathers made this a government for the white man, rejecting the negro, as an ignorant, inferior, barbarian race, incapable of self-government, and not, therefore, entitled to be associated with the white man upon terms of civil, political, or social equality.

This new administration comes into power, under the solemn pledge to overturn and strike down this great feature of our Union, without which it would never have been formed, and to substitute in its stead their new theory of the universal equality of the black and white races.

Our fathers secured to us, by our Constitutional Union, now being overturned by this Black Republican rule, protection to life, liberty and property, all over the Union, and wherever its flag was unfurled, whether on land or sea.

Under this wretched, lawless spirit and policy, now usurping the control of that government, citizens of the South have been deprived of their property, and for attempting to seek the redress promised by the compromise laws, have lost their liberty and their lives.

Equality of rights secured to white men, in equal sovereign States, is among the most prominent features of the Constitution under which we have so long lived.

Mississippi is firmly convinced that there is but one alternative:

This new union with Lincoln Black Republicans and free negroes, without slavery, or, slavery under our old constitutional bond of union, without Lincoln Black Republicans, or free negroes either, to molest us.

If we take the former, then submission to negro equality is our fate. if the latter, then secession is inevitable -- each State for itself and by itself, but with a view to the immediate formation of a Southern Confederacy, under our present Constitution, by such of the slave-holding States as shall agree in their conventions to unite with us...

Mississippi would rather see the last of her race, men, women, and children, immolated in one common funeral pyre than see them subjugated to the degradation of civil, political and social equality with the negro race."

The speech was so well received that one thousand copies of it were printed in pamphlet form.

== Reconstruction ==
After the war his appointment to the High Court of Errors and Appeals of Mississippi was overthrown by president Andrew Johnson in 1867.

== Later life and death ==
In response to the beginning of Reconstruction, Harris left Mississippi and moved to Memphis. He formed a law firm with judge Henry T. Ellett and Confederate Colonel James Phelan, Sr.

He died of pneumonia on November 27, 1868.

Political offices
Preceded by Ephraim S. Fisher	Justice of the Supreme Court of Mississippi; 1858–1867	Succeeded by Thomas Shackelford
