= 1847 Mississippi gubernatorial election =

- November 1, 1847
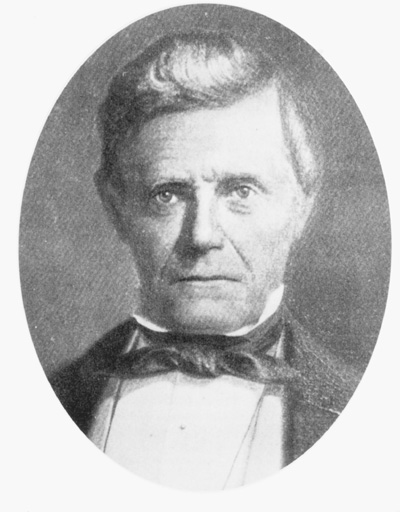

Nominee	Joseph W. Matthews	Alexander Blackburn Bradford
Party	Democratic	Whig
Popular vote	26,995	13,997
Percentage	64.78%	33.59%
- County results Matthews: 50–60% 60–70% 70–80% 80–90% 90–100% Bradford: 50–60% 60–70% No data/vote
Governor before election
Albert G. Brown
Democratic
Elected Governor
Joseph W. Matthews
Democratic

The 1847 Mississippi gubernatorial election was held on November 1, 1847, to elect the governor of Mississippi. Joseph W. Matthews, a Democrat won against Whig Alexander Blackburn Bradford.

== General election ==
With the question of slavery in the background, Mississippi politics slowly became dominated by the issue. Joseph W. Matthews, an outspoken defender of slavery and military leader, was nominated as the Democratic candidate. Alexander B. Bradford, major of the Mississippi militia in the Mexican-American War and lawyer, was nominated for the Whig ticket, a party with a reputation for infrastructure improvements and a moderate slavery stance. Matthews won by a two-to-one margin.

== Results ==
Mississippi gubernatorial election, 1847
Party	Candidate	Votes	%
Democratic	Joseph W. Matthews	26,995	64.78%
Whig	Alexander Blackburn Bradford	13,997	33.59%
	Scattering	682 (Note: Of the scattering votes, 615 were cast for Jefferson Davis.)	1.63%
Total votes		41,674	100.00
Democratic hold			
