= Henry T. Ellett =

American judge (1812–1887)

Henry Thomas Ellett

Member of the U.S. House of Representatives from Mississippi's at-large district
- In office January 26, 1847 – March 3, 1847
- Preceded by: Jefferson Davis
- Succeeded by: District eliminated

Personal details
- Born: March 8, 1812 Salem, New Jersey, U.S.
- Died: October 15, 1887 (aged 75) Memphis, Tennessee, U.S.
- Resting place: Elmwood Cemetery
- Party: Democratic

Henry Thomas Ellett (March 8, 1812 – October 15, 1887) was an American lawyer, politician, judge, slaveowner, and U.S. Representative from Mississippi.

== Biography ==
Born in Salem, New Jersey, Ellett attended the Latin School in Salem and Princeton College, where he studied law. He was admitted to the bar in 1833 and commenced practice in Bridgeton, New Jersey. Ellet moved to Port Gibson, Mississippi, in 1837 and continued the practice of law, in which he was successful.

In the 1846 election, the Democrat Ellett defeated future Civil War general Peter B. Starke for a seat in the Twenty-ninth Congress to fill the vacancy caused by the resignation of Jefferson Davis. He served from January 26 to March 3, 1847. He declined to be a candidate for reelection in 1846 and resumed the practice of law.

He served as a member of the Mississippi State Senate 1853–65, a period that included the Civil War. He was one of the three commissioners who framed the code of 1857. A staunch secessionist who held seventeen people as slaves in 1860, Ellett was a member of the State secession convention in January 1861, and a member of the committee that authored the ordinance of secession announcing the state's departure from the Union. He was appointed Postmaster General of the Confederacy in February 1861 but declined.

After the war ended, Ellett was elected judge of the newly reconstituted Mississippi Supreme Court on October 2, 1865, and served until January 1868, when he resigned. He moved to Memphis, Tennessee, in 1868 and resumed the practice of law in a firm formed with William Littleton Harris and James Phelan, Sr. Ellett was elected chancellor of the twelfth division of Tennessee in 1886.

He died while delivering an address of welcome to President Grover Cleveland in Memphis on October 15, 1887. He was interred in Elmwood Cemetery.

U.S. House of Representatives
Preceded by Jefferson Davis	Member of the U.S. House of Representatives from Mississippi's at-large congressional district 1847	Succeeded by Seat established
