= Jackson Morton =

American politician (1794–1874)

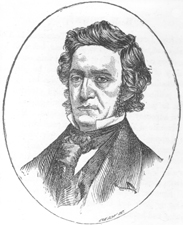

Deputy from Florida to the Provisional Congress of the Confederate States
- In office February 4, 1861 – February 17, 1862
- Preceded by: New constituency
- Succeeded by: Constituency abolished

United States Senator from Florida
- In office March 4, 1849 – March 3, 1855 Serving with: David Yulee 1849–1851; Stephen Mallory 1851–1855
- Preceded by: James Westcott
- Succeeded by: David Yulee

Personal details
- Born: August 10, 1794 Spotsylvania County, Virginia, US
- Died: November 20, 1874 (aged 80) Santa Rosa County, Florida, US
- Party: Whig
- Relations: Jeremiah Morton (brother)
- Education: Washington College; College of William & Mary

Jackson Morton (August 10, 1794 – November 20, 1874) was an American politician. A member of the Whig Party, he represented Florida as a U.S. Senator from 1849 to 1855. He also served as a Deputy from Florida to the Provisional Congress of the Confederate States from 1861 to 1862.

== Early life and education ==
Morton was born in Spotsylvania County, Virginia. He was the brother of Jeremiah Morton, a U.S. Representative from Virginia. Jackson Morton attended Washington College (present-day Washington and Lee University) and the College of William & Mary. He moved to Santa Rosa County, Florida, in 1820 and engaged in the lumber business.

== Political career ==
In 1836, Morton became a member of the Florida Territorial Legislative Council and served as its president in 1837. In 1838, he was a delegate to the state constitutional convention for the first Florida Constitution. He was a United States Navy agent in Pensacola from 1841 to 1845. In 1848, he was a presidential elector on the Whig Party ticket. Morton was elected to the U.S. Senate in 1848. He served in the Senate from 1849 to 1855 when he was no longer a candidate for reelection and resumed his lumber business.

As the division over slavery grew between northern and southern states, Morton became active in the development of the Confederacy. On November 30, 1860, he was chosen to represent Santa Rosa County as a delegate of the Florida Secession Convention in Tallahassee. On January 7, 1861, he was appointed to be part of a twelve-person committee to prepare an Ordinance of Secession for Florida. Morton and George Taliaferro Ward attempted to have the ordinance amended so that Florida would not secede until Georgia and Alabama seceded and so that popular ratification would be required. They were overruled on January 8, 1861, and the ordinance went to a vote as planned. Morton voted in favor of secession and, on January 10, 1861, by a vote of 62–7, Florida became the third state to leave the United States.

On January 17, 1861, Morton was appointed to be a delegate to the Montgomery Convention for constructing a provisional Confederate government. On February 4, 1861, the delegates met and drafted the Provisional Constitution of the Confederate States which was signed by Morton and the rest of the delegates four days later. The delegates at this convention became the Provisional Congress of the Confederate States. He served for the duration of the Provisional Congress and, in the month following the Provisional Constitution, he also signed its successor, the Confederate States Constitution. Morton and Augustus Maxwell were the only people to represent Florida in both the United States Congress and the Confederate States Congress.

== Later life and death ==
Jackson Morton returned to Santa Rosa County and died at his home, "Mortonia", on November 22, 1874. He was interred there in a private cemetery.

== See also ==
- List of slave owners
- List of United States senators from Florida

U.S. Senate
Preceded by James Westcott	U.S. senator (Class 3) from Florida; 1849–1855; Served alongside: David Yulee 1849–1851; Stephen Mallory 1851–1855	Succeeded by David Yulee
Political offices
New constituency	Deputy from Florida to the Provisional Congress of the Confederate States; 1861–1862	Constituency abolished
