= William S. Barry =

American politician (1821–1868)

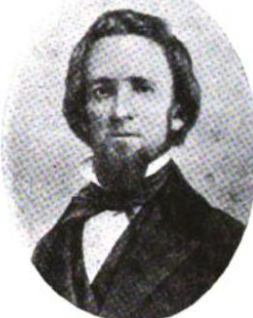

Member of the Provisional Congress of the Confederate States for Mississippi
- In office February 4, 1861 – February 17, 1862

Member of the U.S. House of Representatives from Mississippi's 2nd district
- In office March 4, 1853 – March 4, 1855

Personal details
- Born: December 10, 1821 Columbus, Mississippi
- Died: January 29, 1868 (aged 46)
- Education: Yale College

Military service
- Allegiance: Confederate States of America
- Rank: Colonel
- Commands: 35th Mississippi Infantry
- Battles/wars: American Civil War: Vicksburg Campaign; Atlanta Campaign; Battle of Fort Blakeley

William S. Barry (born William Taylor Sullivan Barry; December 10, 1821 – January 29, 1868) was a Mississippi politician who served as a member of the U.S. House of Representatives, was president of the January 1861 Mississippi Secession Convention, and served as a member of the Provisional Congress of the Confederate States. After leaving the Confederate Congress, he enlisted as a soldier in the American Civil War, serving as commanding officer of the 35th Mississippi Infantry Regiment.

== Biography ==
Born in Columbus, Mississippi, William S. Barry graduated from Yale College in 1841 and was initiated into Skull and Bones Society in his last year. He was admitted to the bar in 1844 and then practiced law in Columbus, Ohio. He served as member of the Mississippi House of Representatives from 1849 to 1851. He was elected as a Democratic member of the United States House of Representatives in the Thirty-third Congress (March 4, 1853 – March 3, 1855), then returned to the state legislature, becoming Speaker of the Mississippi House of Representatives from 1856 to 1857. By 1860, he held seven people as slaves.

A staunch secessionist, Barry served as president of the Mississippi secession convention in January 1861. He was then chosen as one of Mississippi's representatives to the Provisional Congress of the Confederate States. In Congress he advocated extreme measures, such as reopening the Atlantic slave trade (banned by the United States in 1808), the prohibition of any Confederate state from outlawing slavery without the unanimous consent of the other states, and giving the President unlimited powers to raise troops. Barry chose not to run for reelection, leaving office in February 1862. He then enlisted in the Confederate States Army and raised the 35th Mississippi Infantry Regiment, serving as its colonel and at times acting as brigade commander. He was captured and paroled at the Siege of Vicksburg, then returned to his regiment and took part in the Atlanta campaign. Barry was seriously wounded at the Battle of Allatoona on October 5, 1864. He was captured again following one of the final major battles of the war, at Fort Blakeley, Alabama on April 9, 1865, and was held prisoner at New Orleans until May 1, 1865. After his release, Barry resumed the practice of law in Columbus, where he died on January 29, 1868. He is interred in the Odd Fellows Cemetery.

== Personal life and family ==
Barry was the son of Columbus residents Richard Barry and Mary (Sullivan) Barry. He was married to Sarah Fearn. Their son, William Shelby Barry (born 1857), represented Leflore County in the Mississippi House of Representatives from 1888 to 1890 and from 1912 to 1920.

Political offices
New constituency	Deputy from Mississippi to the Provisional Congress of the Confederate States; 1861–1862	Constituency abolished
