= Thomas Johnson (Kentucky politician) =

American politician

Member of the Kentucky Senate from the 28th district
- In office August 6, 1877 – August 1, 1881
- Preceded by: W. A. Cunningham
- Succeeded by: Rodney Haggard

Member of the Kentucky House of Representatives
- In office August 2, 1875 – August 6, 1877
- Preceded by: Constituency established
- Succeeded by: Joseph M. Kash
- Constituency: Menifee, Montgomery, Powell, and Wolfe Counties

Personal details
- Party: Democratic

Thomas Johnson (July 4, 1812 – April 7, 1906) was a prominent Kentucky politician. He was born in Montgomery County, Kentucky and represented the state in the Provisional Confederate Congress.

Johnson served as an officer in the Confederate Army during the American Civil War. After the war he served in the Kentucky House of Representatives from 1875 to 1877 and in the Kentucky State Senate from 1877 to 1881.
