= Cornelius Robinson =

American politician

Cornelius Robinson (September 25, 1805 – July 29, 1867) was a politician from Alabama who served in the Provisional Confederate Congress at the beginning of the American Civil War.

Robinson was born in Wadesboro, North Carolina. He was the sixth of eight children of Tod and Martha Ann (Terry) Robinson of Anson County. He later moved to Alabama, and in 1836 was the captain of a company of infantry.

Following the resignation of Alabama delegate John Gill Shorter in November 1861, Robinson was elected to fill the vacancy. He took his seat on April 29, 1861. He subsequently resigned from the Congress on January 24, 1862. His son Cornelius Robinson, Jr. served as an officer in the 46th Alabama Infantry during the war.

Robinson died on his plantation near Benton, Alabama, and was buried there at Mt. Gilead Cemetery.
