= Mississippi Secession Convention =

Process for Mississippi's secession

Readable PDF copy of the Declaration of Causes of Secession adopted at the convention, stating "Our position is thoroughly identified with the institution of slavery—the greatest material interest of the world".

The Mississippi Secession Convention was held in January 1861 to debate and vote on secession from the United States. A majority of the delegates voted on January 9 to leave the Union, setting Mississippi on a path towards conflict with the Northern states during the American Civil War. Mississippi became a founding member of the Confederate States of America one month later on February 8, 1861. After the civil war, Mississippi was readmitted to the Union on February 23, 1870.

== Road to secession ==
1860 presidential election electoral college results

At the time of the convention in 1861, Mississippi's economy was completely dependent on cotton produced by slave labor. The state was America's largest producer of cotton, with 1,200,000 bales exported annually. A majority of the population were slaves, with over 430,000 people enslaved in 1860, compared to a free white population of less than 350,000. A sizeable class of free people of color such as could be found in Louisiana and northern states did not exist; there were fewer than 1,000 such people living in Mississippi in 1860. The wealthy planter class of the Mississippi river counties were the richest men in the state, but all of their capital was tied up in land and human chattel rather than capitalist investments or industry.

Racist ideology was used to justify the social hierarchy and defend Mississippi's right to secede, as future Confederate President Jefferson Davis stated in 1861: "[Mississippi] has heard proclaimed the theory that all men are created free and equal, and this made the basis of an attack on her social institutions; and the sacred Declaration of Independence has been invoked to maintain the position of the equality of the races," which Davis disagreed with, saying that Black people should not be "put upon the footing of equality with white men" and that they were meant to be "discriminated against as a lower caste" by the American Founding Fathers.

Southern Democrats began to take a hard line against any federal measures to restrict the expansion of slavery. By the 1850s the opposition Whig party had collapsed and Mississippi had essentially become a one-party state dominated by pro-slavery Democrats. In 1850 delegates from several Southern states, including Mississippi, met at the Nashville Convention to discuss the possibility of secession from the Union, and remaining part of the United States was seen as a matter of secondary importance compared to preserving the social and economic system based on slavery. A Democratic faction known as the "Fire-eaters" urged secession at the earliest opportunity, and Mississippi Governor John J. Pettus, elected in 1859, was among the most prominent members of this group. With a reputation as a "disunion man of the most unmitigated order," during Pettus's inaugural address he said that the South's only way to maintain slavery was secession and a Southern Confederacy, and he pledged to defend the "superiority and supremacy of the white race" against "Black Republicans".

During the 1860 presidential election the Democratic party fractured and the pro-slavery vote was divided among three candidates. Only white men could vote in Mississippi, and they mainly supported Southern Democrat candidate John C. Breckinridge, giving him 40,768 votes (59%). John Bell, the Constitutional Unionist mainly supported by former Whigs, came in second with 25,045 votes (36%), and northern Democrat Stephen A. Douglas received 3,282 votes (5%). The Republican candidate Abraham Lincoln was not on the ballot in Mississippi.

== Call for a convention ==
"I am now of opinion that South Carolina will secede, in the event of the election of Abram (sic) Lincoln. If your Legislature gives us the least assurance that you will go with us, there will not be the slightest difficulty and I think we will go out at any rate"

— William Henry Gist, governor of South Carolina, letter to Mississippi governor John J. Pettus, November 6, 1860.

The reaction to Lincoln's election in November 1860 was furious and swift. Pro-secession public meetings were held across the state, and armed citizens began organizing themselves into volunteer military companies. Even before the outcome of the November presidential election was known, South Carolina's governor, William Henry Gist, had already privately written to Mississippi's governor Pettus advising him that South Carolina would secede and encouraging Mississippi to follow. Pettus called for Mississippi's congressional delegation (all pro-slavery Democrats) to meet with him at Jackson on November 22, 1860. The state's US senators, Jefferson Davis and Albert G. Brown, counseled caution, but fire-eater US representatives such as Reuben Davis encouraged the governor to call for immediate secession. Pettus convened the Mississippi Legislature and addressed them on November 26. He began by stating that "the existence or the abolition of African slavery in the Southern States is now up for a final settlement," and that secession offered the "one path of honor and safety of Mississippi". The governor asked the legislature to vote on holding a secession convention and to encourage other Southern states to do the same, lest Mississippi be "cursed with Black Republican politics and free negro morals, to become a cess pool of vice, crime and infamy". The bill to authorize a secession convention passed unanimously, and elections for convention delegates were set for the following month.

== Election of delegates ==
Elections for convention delegates were held on December 20, with 100 delegates to be apportioned between Mississippi's counties based on population. Two factions emerged in the elections, those who advocated immediate unilateral secession, and "cooperationists" who urged caution. Cooperationists were not necessarily opposed to secession, but didn't want to make a unilateral move without the other slave states. Turnout in the December 20 election was only about 60% of the numbers from the November presidential election, and secessionist candidates won an overall majority.

The 100 delegates selected were all white men. Their average age was 42, seven were northern-born and the remainder were born in Mississippi or other Southern states. 45 of the delegates were lawyers or judges, 51 were planters. 38 had served in the state legislature and 7 had represented Mississippi in the US House of Representatives along with 1 delegate who was a former US senator. 84 of the delegates were slaveholders, and 5 delegates were from the ranks of the richest plantation owners who held 100 or more slaves. Although most held fewer than 20 slaves, too few to be classified among the wealthiest slaveowners, the majority of the convention had a vested interest in the existing social order, such that their status, wealth, and future prosperity depended on the continuation of slavery.

Despite being most identified with the institution of plantation slavery, the Mississippi river counties sent the most cooperationist delegates to the convention. The wealthy planters who had the most to lose from war were the most cautious, along with delegates from the northeast corner of the state where there were relatively fewer slaves.

== Meeting of the convention ==
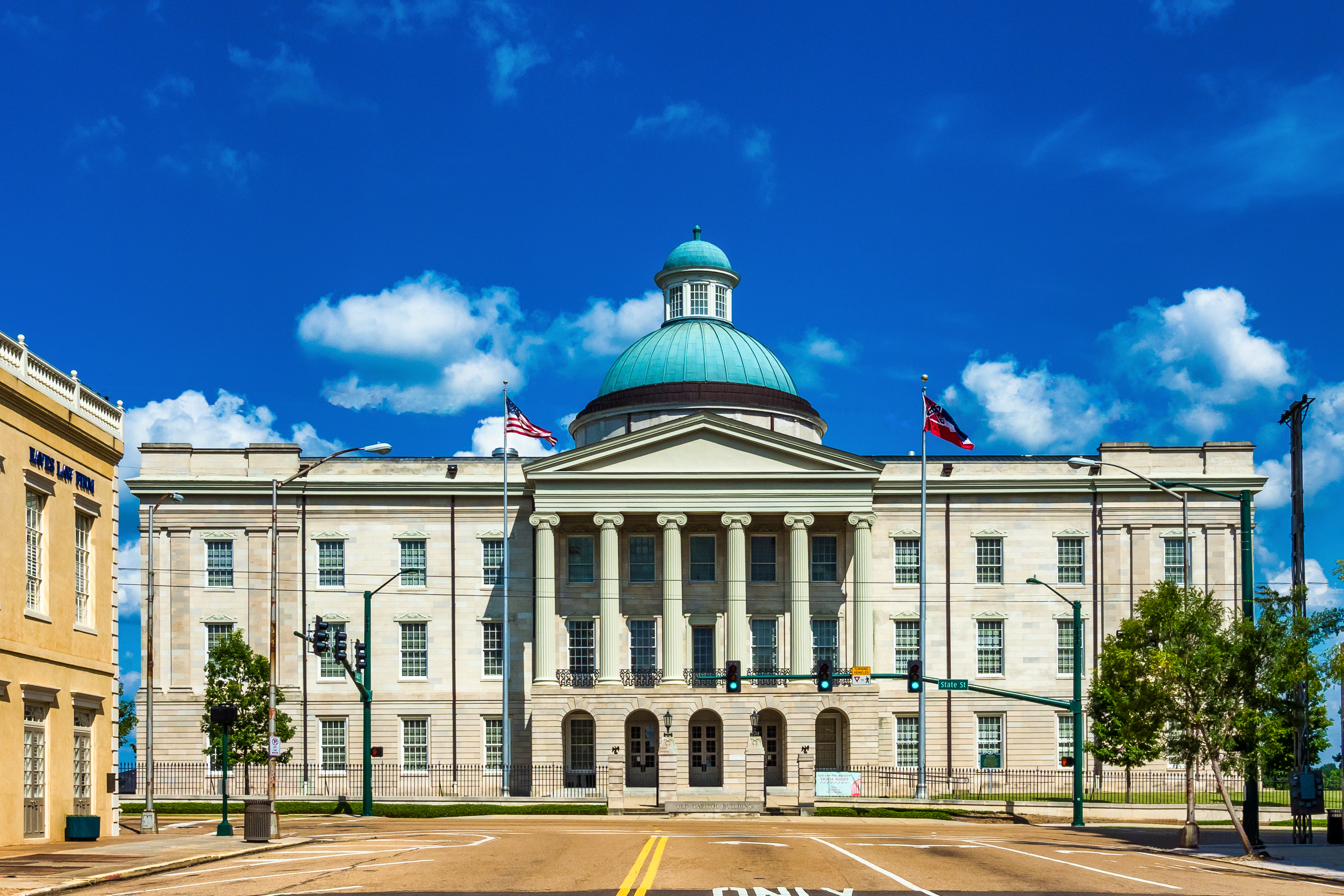
Mississippi's old state capitol building, where the convention met in January 1861

The convention met at the state capitol building in Jackson on January 7, 1861. South Carolina had declared its exit from the Union on December 20, and while other states were discussing the matter, none of Mississippi's neighboring states had taken unilateral action yet. The delegates convened and voted William S. Barry, former speaker of the state house of representatives, as president of the convention. Barry was known as a proponent of secession, and his selection as president by the pro-secession majority set the tone of the proceedings.

On the first day of the convention, Lucius Quintus Cincinnatus Lamar introduced a motion to create a committee who would draft an ordinance of secession. On the second day, members of the ordinance drafting committee were named, with Lamar as chairman, and the convention voted to form other committees who would handle logistical matters arising from secession. A motion introduced by James R. Chalmers to rewrite the state constitution was rejected, with a majority of delegates agreeing the convention had been called for a limited purpose and did not have authority to take such action.

== Secession ordinance ==
On the morning of January 9, Lamar presented the ordinance of secession to the convention. With passage of the measure, "all the laws and ordinances by which the said State of Mississippi became a member of the Federal Union of the United States of America be, and the same are hereby repealed" and Mississippi "shall from henceforth be a free, sovereign and independent State." Lamar closed by stating that secession was necessary to defend "the purity of our Anglo-Saxon race", and opened the floor to debate. When amendments were offered, the convention went into closed session: guests were removed and the record was not taken while cooperationists and secessionists debated the matter behind closed doors.

Cooperationist delegate John W. Wood of Attala County kept the notes of his own speech during the closed session for posterity. Although he was also a slaveowner, Wood denounced the secessionists in harsh terms, correctly prophesizing that their actions would bring war and devastation to the South:

"Let me only warn you and this Convention, that if Secession is carried out, there will be nothing but ruin and desolation follow in its course—war, war, inevitable war...not only war, but war, pestilence and famine will spread over the land a scene of devastation, desolation and destruction. The last words I have to say are, that posterity will hold you Sir, and this Convention, responsible for the act which you this day commit."

The doors were reopened and open session resumed, but Wood left the convention and did not return. Other cooperationist delegates offered motions to delay secession or consult with other states, but these were voted down. When the ordinance of secession was presented for a vote late in the afternoon of January 9, it passed 84–15 with one abstention (Wood). Many of the leading cooperationists voted in favor of secession to present a united front, with James L. Alcorn stating:

Mr. President: I have thought that a different course in regard to the settlement of this great controversy should have been adopted, and to that end I have labored and spoken. But the die is cast—the Rubicon is crossed—and I enlist myself with the army that marches on Rome. I vote for the ordinance.

On receiving a telegram from the convention president informing them of the result, Mississippi's Congressional delegation in Washington D.C. withdrew from Congress and began to return to their home state.

== Committees and further proceedings ==
The convention returned to meet on January 10 (absent delegate Wood, who would not return) to address matters arising out of secession. Although most members expected to join with other states soon, theoretically Mississippi was now an independent republic, and the Confederate States of America had not been formed yet. Members were assigned to committees on citizenship, disposition of federal property, postal & financial matters, the state constitution, military & naval affairs, Indian affairs, the formation of a Southern confederacy, and ways & means. Over the next several days, the delegates debated these matters, with much discussion centering on what powers the convention should to have compared to the normal state legislature, which was not in session at the time the convention began but reconvened on January 16 while convention proceedings were still ongoing. Other matters that were discussed by the convention and eventually passed included setting up an independent postal system, granting Mississippi citizenship to all free white American citizens who had resided in the state on January 9, 1861, taxation of slaves on a per-head basis, and a tax on out-of-state investments.

The military ordinance approved by the convention called for a board consisting of elected generals and the state governor to have authority over all military matters. Eight regiments of infantry would be organized from volunteer companies. Jefferson Davis was voted as major general of the state armed forces, with Earl Van Dorn, Charles Clark, James L. Alcorn, and Christopher H. Mott as brigadier generals. Davis was chosen as Confederate president the next month, and soon afterwards the other appointed Mississippi generals all left the service of the state to join the Confederate States Army. The eight army regiments were eventually turned over to Confederate service as the 1st-8th Mississippi Infantry Regiments.

On January 15, the delegates formally signed the ordinance of secession, with Pettus, the members of the state legislature, and the state supreme court justices present to observe the ceremony. 96 of the 100 delegates signed: John W. Wood had left the convention, another cooperationist John J. Thornton refused to sign, and two members were absent that day but signed later.

As a final measure, a committee drafted a statement titled, "A Declaration of the Immediate Causes Which Induce and Justify the Secession of the State of Mississippi from the Federal Union." This brief document made reference to the American Declaration of Independence, listing Mississippi's grievances with the Union and reasons for secession:

"Our position is thoroughly identified with the institution of slavery—the greatest material interest of the world...Utter subjugation awaits us in the Union...We must either submit to degradation, and to the loss of property worth four billions of money, or we must secede from the Union framed by our fathers...For far less cause than this, our fathers separated from the Crown of England. Our decision is made. We follow their footsteps. We embrace the alternative of separation; and for the reasons here stated, we resolve to maintain our rights with the full consciousness of the justice of our course, and the undoubting belief of our ability to maintain it."

The convention then adjourned on January 26.

== Aftermath ==
The Bonnie Blue Flag, unofficially adopted as the state's flag following secession

After the convention, representatives were sent from different Southern states to meet at Montgomery, Alabama in February for purposes of forming a new union between their newly-seceded states. While the convention had been in session, Florida (January 10), Alabama (January 11), Georgia (January 19), and Louisiana (January 26) had all joined Mississippi and South Carolina in leaving the United States. The Mississippi convention had selected seven delegates to send to the Provisional Congress of the Confederate States in Montgomery. This body would go on to formally establish the new Southern Confederacy on February 8, as well as select Mississippian Jefferson Davis as president.

On March 25, the Mississippi convention reconvened at Jackson to ratify the Constitution of the Confederate States that had been approved in Montgomery. The new constitution copied the main elements of the United States Constitution, but added new measures to protect slavery. Ninety of the delegates reconvened in March, with several already away, having enlisted in the army. There was some debate by cooperationists seeking to submit ratification to a popular vote, but a majority voted to ratify the Confederate constitution on March 29, then the convention adjourned again for the final time.

== Notable convention members ==
Several of the convention delegates were prominent in antebellum politics, or later went on to have careers in the Confederate government, Confederate army, or the post-war US government.
Government figures:

- James L. Alcorn, leading cooperationist, postwar governor of Mississippi and US senator
- William S. Barry, president of the convention, antebellum US representative, later a Confederate congressman
- Walker Brooke, antebellum US senator, later a Confederate congressman.
- Jeremiah Watkins Clapp, later a Confederate congressman
- James Z. George, postwar US senator and chief justice of the Supreme Court of Mississippi
- Lucius Quintus Cincinnatus Lamar, postwar US congressman, US senator, US Secretary of the Interior in the Cleveland administration, and justice of the Supreme Court of the United States
- Wiley P. Harris, antebellum US congressman, delegate to the Provisional Confederate Congress
- Jehu Amaziah Orr, later a Confederate congressman
- Daniel B. Wright, antebellum US representative

Judicial figures:

- Alexander M. Clayton, antebellum justice of the Mississippi Supreme Court, later a delegate to the Provisional Confederate Congress.
- Henry T. Ellett, later a state supreme court justice
- Samuel H. Terral, later a state supreme court justice

Military figures

- Samuel Benton, Confederate colonel, promoted to brigadier general two days before his death in the 1864 Atlanta Campaign
- William F. Brantley, Confederate general
- James Ronald Chalmers, Confederate general, post-war US congressman
- Samuel J. Gholson, antebellum US representative, later general of Mississippi State Troops and Confederate brigadier general

== The Bonnie Blue flag ==
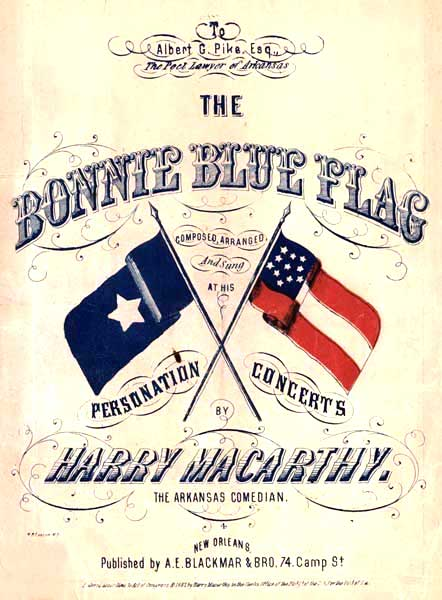
Sheet music of McCarthy's "The Bonnie Blue Flag", written to commemorate Mississippi's secession. The bonnie blue flag (left) is paired with the first Confederate national flag (right).

When the vote for secession was announced on January 9, the citizens of Jackson presented President of the convention William S. Barry with a blue flag with a single star at its center. The American flag was lowered over the capitol building and the blue flag was raised in its place. The design of this flag was identical to that of the Republic of West Florida, a short-lived republic along the modern Louisiana-Mississippi border that had been annexed by the United States in 1810.

An Irish entertainer named Harry McCarthy was tipped off by delegate Wiley P. Harris that the convention would vote to secede that day, and Harris told McCarthy to "give us a patriotic song". McCarthy penned original lyrics set to a traditional Irish melody, titled "The Bonnie Blue Flag". As crowds began to celebrate secession, McCarthy sang his new song in a Jackson theater, and as one newspaper reported, "he was encored again and again, twelve or fifteen times at least, until he became hoarse from singing and the audience almost exhausted from applauding." The song become one of the most popular anthems of the Confederacy, along with "Dixie".

When the convention reconvened in March, they adopted a different flag that had official status until 1865. The official 1861 flag had a white field, red border, and a magnolia tree emblem, but the blue field and white star elements were kept in the new flag's canton.

== Bibliography ==
- Smith, Timothy B. (2014). The Mississippi Secession Convention. The University Press of Mississippi. ISBN 978-1-62846-097-1.
