= Daniel Whyte =

Daniel Whyte may refer to:

- Daniel Whyte (American football), American football player
- Daniel Whyte (soccer), Canadian-born Guyanese soccer player

== See also ==
- Daniel White (disambiguation)
