= Ephraim S. Fisher =

American judge (1815–1876)

Justice of the High Court of Errors and Appeals of Mississippi
- In office 1852–1860
- Preceded by: Alexander M. Clayton
- Succeeded by: William Littleton Harris

Personal details
- Born: November 15, 1815 near Danville, Kentucky, U.S.
- Died: October 12, 1876 (aged 60)
- Party: Whig
- Profession: Judge

Ephraim S. Fisher (November 15, 1815 – October 12, 1876) was a justice of the Mississippi High Court of Errors and Appeals (predecessor to the Supreme Court of Mississippi) from 1852 to 1860. He also served in the Mississippi Senate in the 1840s and was a candidate for governor after the Civil War.

Fisher was born near Danville, Kentucky. He moved to Mississippi in 1833 and, a brief sojourn at Vicksburg, he obtained a license to practice law and located at Coffeeville. He married, acquired a plantation and slaves in Yalobusha County. A Whig, he opposed secession, but rallied to the Confederate cause during the Civil War.

He served in the legislature during one session, and declined reelection. He attained high rank at the bar, and was in 1851 promoted to the supreme bench, where he served with "industry and ability" until the onset of the Civil War, when he resigned his position to resume the practice of law.

He was nominated for governor of Mississippi in 1865, but was at the time of his nomination in Washington city on professional business, and did not return until a few days before the election. In 1869, he was appointed to the circuit bench by Governor Alcorn. In 1876, he removed to Texas and died suddenly a few months later.

One of his sons was active in the Ku Klux Klan.

Political offices
| Preceded by Alexander M. Clayton | Justice of the Supreme Court of Mississippi; 1852–1860 | Succeeded by William Littleton Harris |
