= James Patton Anderson =

American politician (1822–1872)

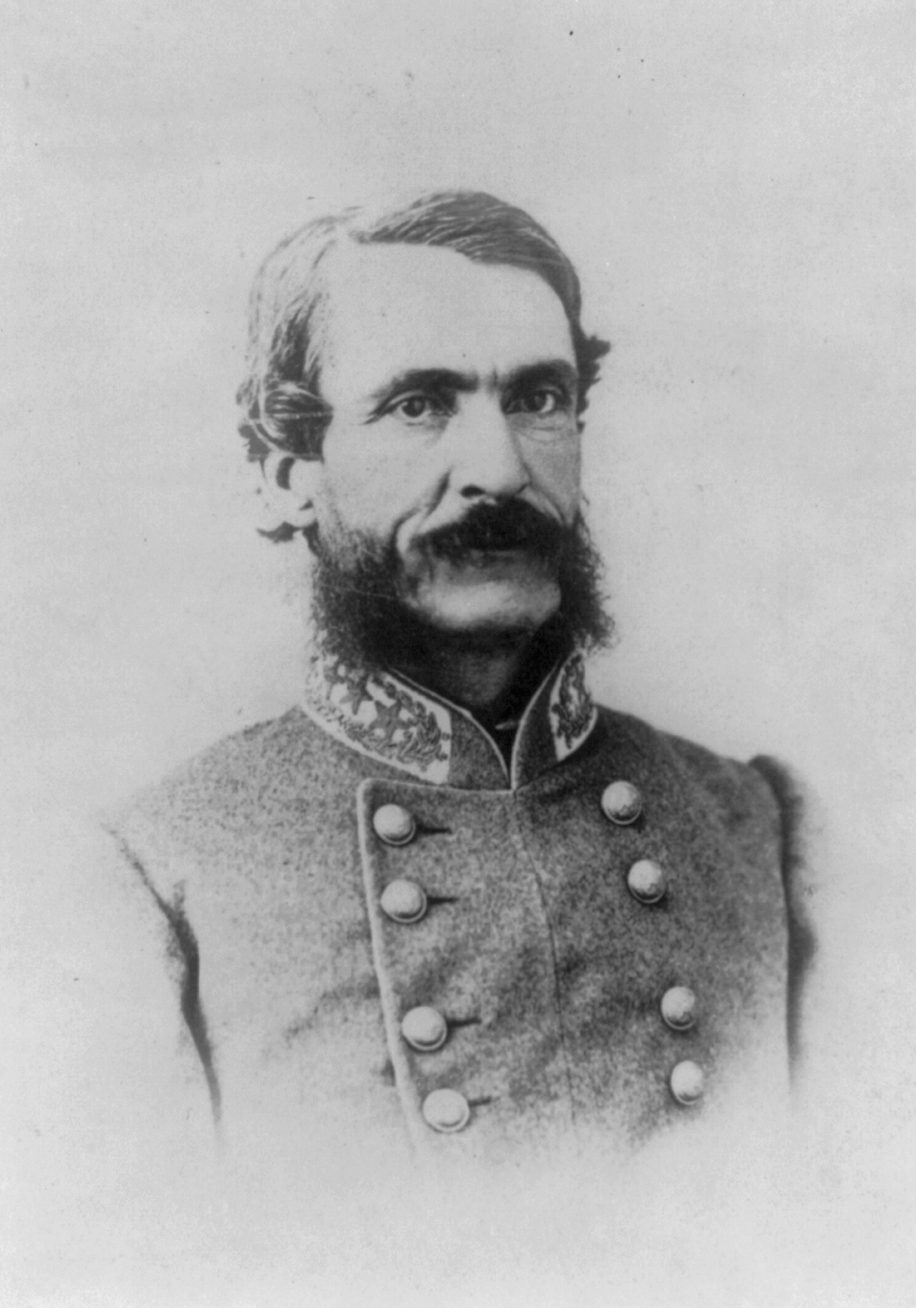

Deputy from Florida to the Provisional Congress of the Confederate States
- In office February 4, 1861 – February 17, 1862
- Preceded by: New constituency
- Succeeded by: Constituency abolished

Member of the U.S. House of Representatives from Washington Territory's At-large district
- In office March 4, 1855 – March 3, 1857 (Delegate)
- Preceded by: Columbia Lancaster
- Succeeded by: Isaac Stevens

Member of the Mississippi House of Representatives
- In office 1850

Personal details
- Born: February 16, 1822 Franklin County, Tennessee, U.S.
- Died: September 20, 1872 (aged 50) Memphis, Tennessee, U.S.
- Resting place: Elmwood Cemetery, Memphis, Tennessee, U.S.
- Party: Democratic
- Spouse: Henrietta Adair (m. 1853)
- Education: Jefferson College
- Occupation: Lawyer, farmer

Military service
- Allegiance: United States; Confederate States
- Branch/service: United States Volunteers; Confederate States Army
- Years of service: 1847–1848; 1861–1865
- Rank: Lieutenant Colonel (USA); Major General (CSA)
- Commands: 1st Florida Infantry; Anderson's Brigade; Anderson's Division
- Battles/wars: Mexican–American War; American Civil War: Battle of Shiloh; Battle of Perryville; Battle of Stones River; Battle of Chickamauga; Battle of Missionary Ridge; Battle of Ezra Church; Battle of Utoy Creek; Battle of Jonesboro

James Patton Anderson (February 16, 1822 – September 20, 1872) was an American slave owner, medical doctor, lawyer, and politician, most notably serving as a United States Congressman from the Washington Territory, a Mississippi state legislator, and a delegate at the Florida state secession convention to withdraw from the United States. He also served in the American Civil War as a general in the Confederate States Army, serving in the Army of Tennessee.

== Early life and career ==
James Patton Anderson was born near Winchester in Franklin County, Tennessee. He was the son of Col. William P. Anderson and his second wife, Margaret L. (Adair) Anderson. As a young boy, he moved with his family to Kentucky in 1831, where he lived for most of his childhood, and then to Mississippi in 1838. He attended the medical school of Jefferson College in Canonsburg, Pennsylvania in 1840, before a family financial crisis forced him to withdraw a short time before graduation in 1842. Soon after his return home, Anderson began practicing medicine.

He studied law at Montrose Law School in Frankfort, Kentucky, and was admitted to the bar in 1843, establishing a practice in Hernando in DeSoto County, Mississippi. He also entered the state's militia forces with the rank of captain in 1846. He later served in the Mexican–American War, commanding the 2nd Battalion, Mississippi Rifles with the rank of lieutenant colonel as of February 22, 1848. That July he was mustered out of the volunteer service. J. Patton Anderson lived, likely as a boarder, in the household of Nathan Bedford Forrest in De Soto County, Mississippi at the time of the 1850 U.S. census. Anderson had organized the company in which Bedford's brother John N. Forrest had served during the Mexican War.

Anderson later entered politics, serving in the Mississippi House of Representatives and befriending Jefferson Davis, a fellow former Mississippi volunteer officer in the U.S. Army. He also found work as a gold prospector. When Davis became Secretary of War under President Franklin Pierce, he appointed Anderson as U.S. Marshal for the Washington Territory. Anderson relocated there to Olympia and served as marshal for several years before being selected to represent the territory in the 34th Congress as a Democrat.

After his two-year term, concerned that the Union was collapsing, he moved back to the South to the state of Florida. His aunt Ellen Adair White Beatty, who owned the "Casa Bianca" plantation outside Monticello in Jefferson County, Florida, invited him and his family to live at the plantation and manage it for her. He was an active participant in the Florida Secession Convention.

== American Civil War ==
Just prior to the start of the American Civil War, Anderson was appointed a captain of the Jefferson Rifles (Note: The Jefferson Rifles were eventually mustered in as Company H of the 3rd Florida Infantry Regiment in July 1861. However, Anderson had already been promoted by that time and was no longer leading the unit.) in the Florida Militia on January 11, 1861. Soon after Florida's secession, Anderson was one of three deputies (delegates) from Florida to the Provisional Congress of the Confederate States, beginning February 4 and resigned on May 2. He accepted a commission as the Colonel of the 1st Florida Infantry on April 1, and initially served under Braxton Bragg in Pensacola. There he commanded the 2nd Brigade in the Army of Pensacola from October 12 to January 27, 1862.

He was promoted to the rank of Brigadier general on February 10, 1862, and was assigned to the Western Theater, commanding a brigade in the Battle of Shiloh in April. He fought with the Army of Tennessee during the battles of Perryville, Stones River, Chickamauga, and Chattanooga.

Anderson was promoted to Major general on February 17, 1864,. He served a brief stint (March–July 1864) commanding the Confederate District of Florida, before leaving to rejoin the Army of Tennessee during the Atlanta campaign. On July 29, he assumed command of division previously commanded by to Maj. Gens. Jones M. Withers and Thomas C. Hindman. Anderson would lead the division, in Lt. Gen. Stephen D. Lee's Corps at the Utoy Creek, and in the early stages of the Battle of Jonesboro before suffering a serious jaw wound on the evening of August 31. Temporarily unfit for duty, he was relieved of his command and sent home to Monticello.

He later returned to duty in April 1865 during the Carolinas campaign, against his physicians' orders, and served with his men for the remainder of the war until their surrender to federal forces at Greensboro, North Carolina, in the spring of 1865. He was paroled on May 1, and would be pardoned by the U.S. Government on December 2, 1866.

== Later life ==
Following the war, Anderson resided in Memphis, Tennessee, although he faced difficulty working due to his injuries sustained during the war. He sold insurance for a while and eventually became the editor of a small agricultural newspaper. He was collector of delinquent state taxes for Shelby County.

Anderson died in relative poverty at his home in Memphis at the age of 50, due primarily to lingering effects of his old war wound. He was buried there in the city's Elmwood Cemetery, Memphis, Tennessee.

== See also ==
- List of American Civil War generals
- Patton Anderson (speculator), his uncle

== Notes ==
U.S. House of Representatives
| Preceded by Columbia Lancaster | Delegate to the U.S. House of Representatives from Washington Territory; 1855–1857 | Succeeded by Isaac Stevens |
Political offices
| New constituency | Deputy from Florida to the Provisional Congress of the Confederate States; 1861–1862 | Constituency abolished |
