= Johnny Thomas =

Johnny Thomas may refer to:

- Johnny Thomas (cornerback) (born 1964), American football player
- Johnny Thomas (American football, born 1956), former American football player and coach
- Johnny Thomas (footballer) (1926–2006), association football player for Swindon Town, Chester City and Stockport County
- Johnny Thomas (rugby) (died 1954), Welsh rugby union and rugby league footballer who played in the 1900s, 1910s and 1920s

== See also ==
- John Thomas (disambiguation)
