= John Henry Thomas =

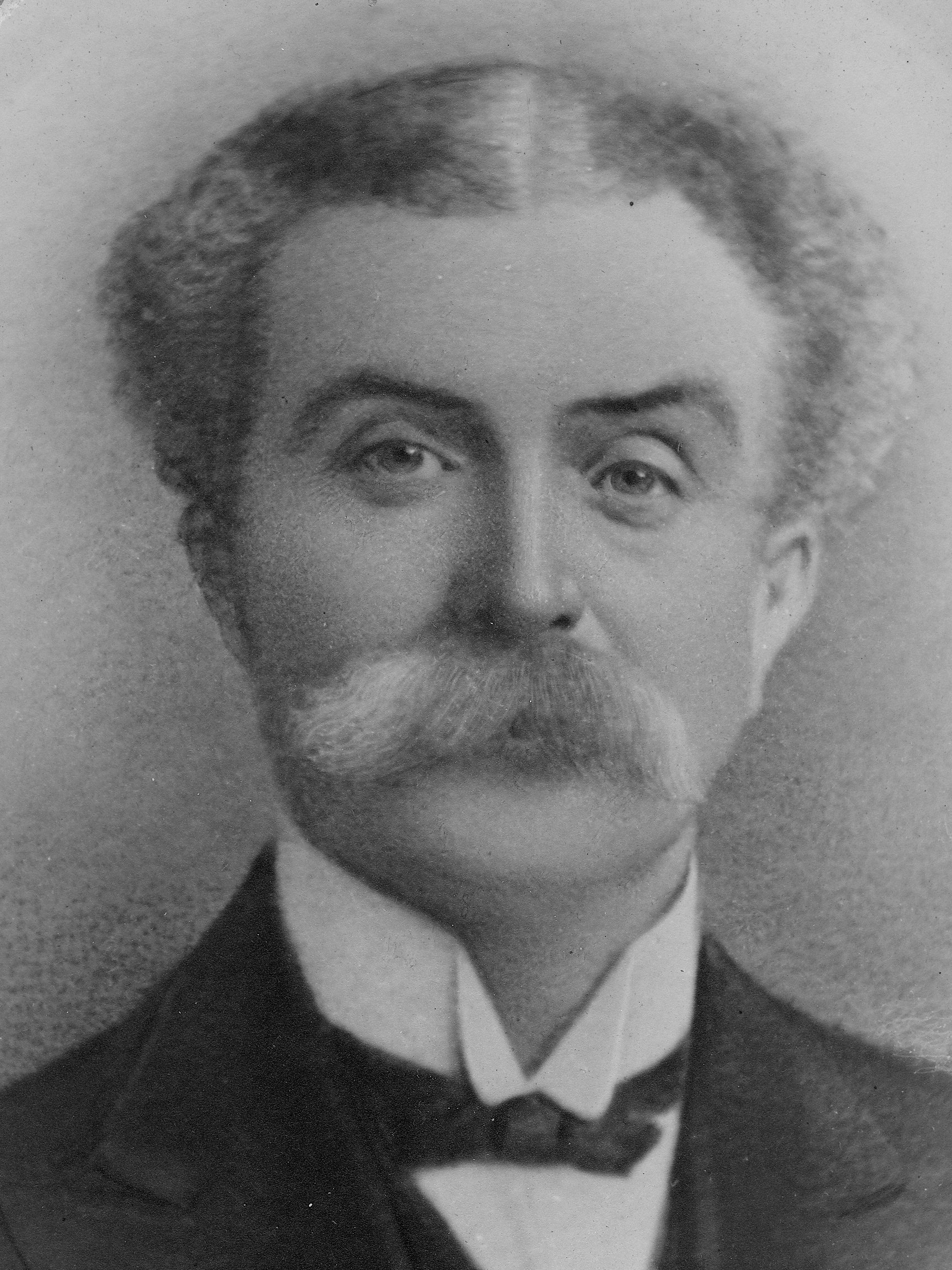
Photographic Portrait of John Henry Thomas Composer and Conductor

John Henry Thomas (born 24 November 1854, in Truro, Cornwall, died 22 February 1928, in Moonta) was an Australian composer, editor, and conductor. He is known for composing several Cornish Christmas Carols and the 1897 publication of his book The Christmas Welcome, was engraved in Germany by C.G. Röder, Leipzig. Thomas learned to play music on a harmonium, which he kept into his adult life as one of his most treasured possessions.

John Henry Thomas' father, John Thomas, was a miner in Cornwall and arrived in South Australia in 1885 with his wife, Catherine Jacka after the mining boom had occurred due to the discovery of copper in 1861 in Moonta. The mine became prosperous and many Cornish miners followed after an advertisement by the South Australian Government. In 1875 Moonta was the second largest town after the capital, Adelaide, with a population of 12,000 people. Thus the miners made an important contribution to the Australian economy and were crucial to the prospering of Moonta and the surrounding district. They brought their culture and traditions with them including their music which was pivotal in keeping their Cornish culture alive. This area became a virtual Cornish enclave and was named "Little Cornwall". John Henry Thomas helped to maintain the Cornish culture through his compositions and leadership in the musical community.

Thomas moved to Australia with his parents as an infant and as an adult was active in Moonta, where he worked as a composer and conductor. In November 1878 J.H. Thomas married Elizabeth Ann Thomas, with whom he had four children. He was also active in the general community and served as a councilor from 1901 to 1903 and later as an auditor for many firms in the following years. Thomas also served as the leader of the Bible Christian Sunday School for 55 years and as the choirmaster and organist of the Bible Christian Choir, later renamed in 1923 to the Methodist Choir. He was also the resident conductor of the Moonta Fisks, conductor of the Moonta Military Band, and leader of the Moonta Male Voice Choir. Thomas would also conduct massed bands and combined choirs at the Moonta Recreational Grounds, during the "Back to Moonta" celebrations.

In 1959 Thomas's carols in "The Christmas Welcome" were published in a collection of Cornish carols entitled A Collection of Cornish Carols, which was released via Allan & Co. They are sung every year in Cornish communities globally, especially at Christmas time.

== Publications ==
=== Collections ===
- The Christmas Welcome (1897)

=== Songs ===
- "The Rose of Australia"
- "The Christmas Welcome"
