= Dan White (rugby union) =

English rugby union player

- Born: 1 May 1989 (age 37) Hull, England
- Height: 5 ft 9 in (1.79 m)
- Weight: 12 st 10 lb (81 kg)

Rugby union career
- Position: Scrum half
Senior career
| Years | Team | Apps | (Points) |
| 2006– | Leeds Carnegie | | |

Dan White (born 1 May 1989) is a professional rugby union player for Leeds Carnegie, and notable down syndrome advocate. White joined Leeds Carnegie in 2006 and is a graduate of Hymers College in Hull.

His primary position is at scrum-half. His advocacy for people with down syndrome comes from his own affliction with the condition.
