= Jack Thomas (footballer, born 1890) =

English footballer

Personal information
- Full name: John William Thomas
- Date of birth: 30 September 1890
- Place of birth: Sacriston, England
- Date of death: 1947 (aged 56–57)
- Position: Inside right

Senior career*
Years	Team	Apps	(Gls)
–1910	Spennymoor United		
1910–1911	Brighton & Hove Albion	1	(0)
1911–1912	Newcastle United	1	(0)
1912–19??	Spennymoor United		
- * Club domestic league appearances and goals

John William Thomas MSM (30 September 1890 – 1947) was an English professional footballer who played in the Football League for Newcastle United as an inside right.

== Personal life ==
Either side of the First World War, Thomas worked as a miner, latterly in Sacriston.

After the outbreak of the First World War in August 1914, he enlisted as a lance corporal in the Durham Light Infantry. In 1915, Thomas took part in the Second Battle of Ypres. During the battle, he was taken prisoner of war near Boetleer's Farm and was sent to Germany, where he was incarcerated with French prisoners and learnt the language. He eventually escaped with four other French prisoners and by using a compass which had been hidden in a cake sent from home, he made it to the neutral Netherlands. Upon his return to Britain, Thomas was interrogated as a possible German spy, but was then sent back to France to work in counter-espionage, by posing as a French dock worker in Le Havre and Dieppe. He won the Meritorious Service Medal during the course of his service.

== Career statistics ==
Appearances and goals by club, season and competition
Club	Season	League			FA Cup		Total	
Club	Season	Division	Apps	Goals	Apps	Goals	Apps	Goals
Brighton & Hove Albion	1910–11	Southern League First Division	1	0	0	0	1	0
Newcastle United	1911–12	First Division	1	0	0	0	1	0
Career total			2	0	0	0	2	0
