= John J. Thomas =

American politician (1813–1895)

John J. Thomas (August 8, 1813 – 1895) was a prominent Confederate politician. He was born in Albemarle County, Virginia and later moved to Kentucky, where he served in the state legislature in 1851. He represented the state in the Provisional Confederate Congress from 1861 to 1862 and afterwards served in the Confederate Army.
