= John Thomas (New York politician) =

American politician (1792–1866)

Personal details
- Born: January 27, 1792 Woodbridge, Connecticut, U.S.
- Died: March 4, 1866 (aged 74) Galesburg, Illinois, U.S.
- Spouse: Caroline Beers (m. 1815)
- Children: 1
- Education: Yale University
- Occupation: Politician; lawyer

John Thomas (January 27, 1792 – March 4, 1866) was an American politician and lawyer. He served in the New York State Legislature.

== Early life ==
John Thomas was born on January 27, 1792, in Woodbridge, Connecticut, to John Thomas. He graduated from Yale University in 1811. He then studied law in New Haven, Connecticut.

== Career ==
Thomas practiced law in New Haven for several years. In 1824, he moved to Cortlandville, New York, where he continued to practice law.

Thomas served in the New York State Legislature. He was associated with the abolition party and contributed to its publications.

== Personal life ==
Thomas married Caroline Beers, daughter of Elias Beers, of New Haven on December 3, 1815. They had at least one son, E.F.

In 1860, Thomas moved to Galesburg, Illinois, to live with his son. He died on March 4, 1866, at the home of his son in Galesburg.
