= Samuel Howard Ford =

American politician

Samuel Howard Ford (February 19, 1819 – July 5, 1905) was a Confederate politician.

== Biography ==
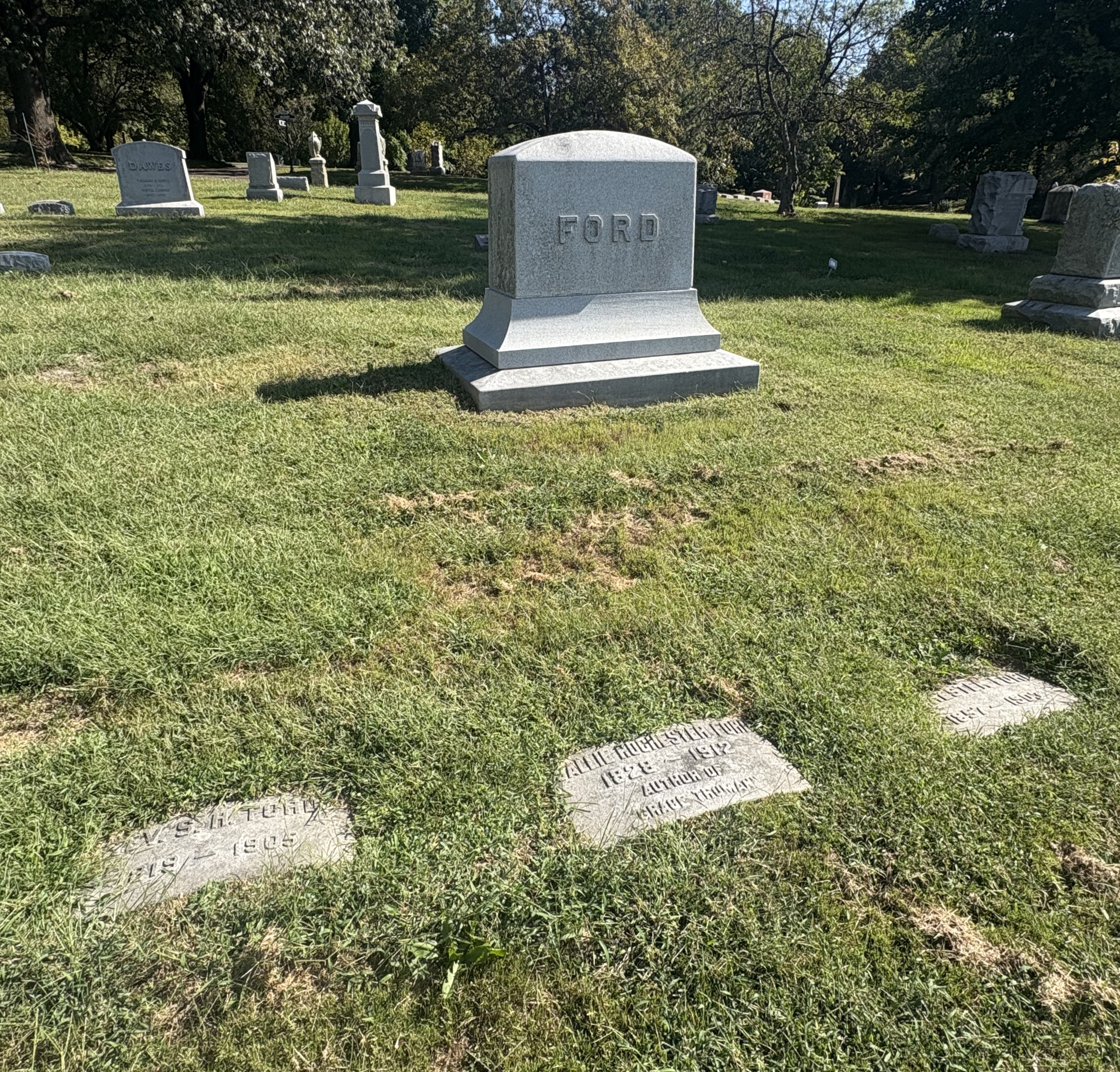
Ford's grave at Bellefontaine Cemetery

He was born in London, England and later emigrated to the United States, settling in Missouri. He moved to Paducah, Kentucky, and represented that state in the Provisional Confederate Congress from December 1861 through February 1862.

He died at his home in Jennings, Missouri on July 5, 1905, and was buried at Bellefontaine Cemetery in St. Louis.
