= John Thomas sign =

Joke term for penis position

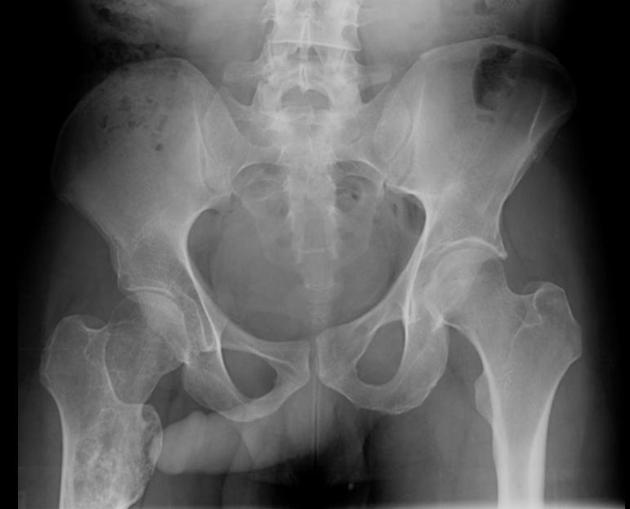
Positive John Thomas sign in patient with right femoral enchondroma

The John Thomas sign, also known as the Throckmorton sign, is a slang or joke term used in the field of radiology. It refers to the position of a penis as it relates to pathology on an X-ray of a pelvis. When the penis (visible on the X-ray as a shadow) points towards the same side as a unilateral medical condition such as a broken bone, this is considered a "positive John Thomas sign," and if the shadow points to the other side, it is a "negative John Thomas sign."

Studies have shown that the "sign" is no better than chance at identifying the location of a hip fracture. In those cases where the John Thomas sign is positive, it has been proposed that a person with a displaced hip fracture may try to lie on the injured side to immobilize the fracture and reduce pain; the penis then inclines toward the downward (injured) side.

Andy Murray, British professional tennis player, released a picture of his pelvic X-ray following his hip resurfacing surgery on January 29, 2019, clearly demonstrating an example of a negative John Thomas or Throckmorton sign where his penis pointed away from the site of injury. The release of the X-ray image with visible genitalia was discussed by Piers Morgan on Good Morning Britain, prompting Murray, who was watching at the time, to message the show, stating, "Please can you stop discussing my genitals on national TV, I was heavily medicated at the time of posting."
