= John Pease Sanderson =

American politician

John Pease Sanderson (November 28, 1816 – June 28, 1871) was a delegate of the Florida Secession Convention in Tallahassee, and then a Florida member of the Congress of the Confederate States during the American Civil War.

== Biography ==
John Sanderson was born in Sunderland, Bennington County, Vermont, to John H. and Sarah (Laurence) Sanderson. He graduated from Amherst College in 1839. Before the civil war erupted, he was a lawyer, secessionist Democrat and was part of the Planter Class in Jacksonville, Florida.

He became a member of the Florida State House of Representatives in 1843, was the solicitor of the Eastern Circuit of Florida from 1848 to 1852 and became a Florida State Senator in 1848. He was a delegate to both the Florida Secession Convention of 1861 and then to the Confederate Provisional Congress from February 5–17, 1862, replacing George Taliaferro Ward.

He was president of the Florida, Atlantic, and Gulf Central Railroad in 1857, and vice-president of the Jacksonville, Pensacola and Mobile Railroad.

John was married twice. He first married Mary E. Harrison (daughter of Robert Harrison of Amelia Island, Florida) on February 23, 1843. They had no children. Following her death on April 27, 1857, he later married her sister Marion R. Harrison on July 28, 1858. They had 2 children.

He died June 28, 1871, in Manhattan, New York City.
