= Daniel Price White =

Confederate politician

Speaker of the Kentucky House of Representatives
- In office 1857–1859

Personal details
- Born: November 16, 1814; Green County, Kentucky
- Died: April 12, 1890 (aged 75)
- Resting place: White Cemetery, Black Gnat, Kentucky
- Citizenship: Confederate States of America; United States of America
- Political party: Democratic
- Spouse: Nancy Ferris Clark
- Children: 4
- Parents: William Price White (father); Judith Taylor (mother)
- Occupation: Speaker of Kentucky State House of Representatives; Kentucky Delegate to Confederate Provisional Congress; Volunteer surgeon

Daniel Price White (November 16, 1814 – April 12, 1890) was a prominent Confederate politician.

== Early life ==
He was born in Green County, Kentucky, to his mother Judith Taylor and father Major General William Price White. He was educated at Centre College and medicine at Lexington Kentucky and Cincinnati Ohio. Afterwards he practiced medicine in Green County. He married Nancy Ferris Clark in 1837. He had 4 children: Irene Elizabeth White was born in 1842, Daniel A. "Bud" White was born in 1843, Dr. William Price White was born in 1844 and James Clarke White was born in 1847 and died in the following year of 1848.

== Political life ==
He joined the Kentucky legislature before becoming Speakers of the Kentucky House of Representatives in 1857–1859. He joined the Democratic National Committee in 1860. He joined the Confederate States of America in 1861. Represented the state in the Provisional Confederate Congress from 1861 to 1862.

== Later life ==
After the collapse of the CSA he worked at White, Brown and White Green River Tobacco Warehouse.

He died on April 12, 1890.
