= John Thomas (Australian footballer) =

Australian rules footballer

Personal information
- Full name: John Thomas
- Born: 4 June 1935
- Died: 22 November 2011 (aged 76)
- Original team: Swan Hill
- Height: 183 cm (6 ft 0 in)
- Weight: 76 kg (168 lb)

Playing career^{1}
Years	Club	Games (Goals)
1958–60	Geelong	35 (8)
- ^{1} Playing statistics correct to the end of 1960.

John Thomas (4 June 1935 – 22 November 2011) was an Australian rules footballer who played with Geelong in the Victorian Football League (VFL).
