= John Thomas (English cricketer) =

English cricketer (1879–1949)

John Thomas (1879 – 1 June 1949) played first-class cricket for Somerset from 1901 to 1905. His precise date and place of birth are not known; he died at Taunton, Somerset.

Thomas was a tail-end batsman and an opening bowler; his batting and bowling styles are not known. He played in one first-class match in each of the 1901, 1904 and 1905 seasons for Somerset. His only first-class wicket came in his first game, against Oxford University in 1901. His only runs of any note came with a score of 23 in his 1904 game against Sussex. His final game was the solitary match played for Somerset by the legendary fast bowler Tom Richardson; in the game against the 1905 Australians, Thomas was the last batsman to play an innings alongside Richardson and his bowling figures of 0/65 were identical to Richardson's, as the Australians amassed 609 for four wickets, with Warwick Armstrong making an unbeaten 303.
