= John R. Thomas (professor) =

Legal scholar

John R. "Jay" Thomas (born 1967) is a professor of law at Georgetown University Law Center.

== Early life and education ==
Thomas received a B.S. in Computer Engineering from Carnegie Mellon University. He earned a J.D. from the University of Michigan and an LL.M. from the George Washington University Law School.

== Career ==
After law school, he was a law clerk to Helen W. Nies, then Chief Judge of the United States Court of Appeals for the Federal Circuit.

Since 1999, Thomas has served as a visiting scholar at the Congressional Research Service. In that capacity he assisted members of Congress and their staff during the enactment of such legislation as the American Inventors Protection Act and the America Invents Act. Thomas served as the Thomas Alva Edition Fellow at the United States Patent and Trademark Office. He has been a member of the faculties of Cornell University, George Washington University (and an assistant professor at its law school) and the University of Tokyo. He has served as a visiting scholar at the Max Planck Institute for Intellectual Property and Competition Law in Munich, Germany, and the Institute of Intellectual Property in Tokyo, Japan.

The 2005 first edition of his Pharmaceutical Patent Law was well-reviewed by Dennis Crouch of Patently-O, who described it as "an excellent treatise that will be very well regarded for years to come" and "surprisingly readable". In 2019, Thomas suggested that patent "march-in rights", which permit the U.S. government to force licensure of certain patents, "might make drugmakers pause" before exacting excessive prices for their products, a view for which Thomas was criticized by Joseph Allen of IPWatchdog, who asserted that in a previous Congressional Research Service report, Thomas appeared to assert that such use of march-in rights would require further Congressional action.

== Works ==
Thomas has authored and co-authored many books, primarily in the field of intellectual property.

- Thomas, John R. (2019). Pharmaceutical Patent Law. Washington, D.C.: Bureau of National Affairs 3d ed. 2015 & Supp.
- Thomas, John R.; Schechter, Roger E. (2019). Principles of Patent Law. St. Paul, Minnesota: Thomson/West.
- Thomas, John R.; Abramson, Brian Dean; Safir, Peter O. (2018). Vaccine, Vaccination, and Immunization Law. Washington, D.C.: Bloomberg Law. (Second Edition, 2022; Third Edition 2025)
- Thomas, John R.; Adelman, Martin J.; Rader, Randall R. (2018). Cases and Materials on Patent Law (5th ed.). St. Paul, Minnesota: West.
- Thomas, John R. (2015). Pharmaceutical Patent Law (3rd ed.). Arlington, Virginia: Bureau of National Affairs.
- Thomas, John R.; Schechter, Roger E. (2010). Principles of Copyright Law. St. Paul, Minnesota: West.
- Thomas, John R. (2005). Intellectual Property and the Free Trade Agreements (PDF). Washington, D.C.: Congressional Research Service.
- Thomas, John R.; Adelman, Martin J.; Rader, Randall R.; Wegner, Harold C. (2003). Cases and Materials on Patent Law (2nd ed.). St. Paul, Minnesota: Thomson/West. ISBN 9780314246370.
- Thomas, John R.; Schechter, Roger E. (2003). Intellectual Property: The Law of Copyrights, Patents, and Trademarks. St. Paul, Minnesota: Thomson/West.
