= John Thomas Idlet =

American poet

- Born: December 31, 1930; Baltimore, Maryland, U.S.
- Died: March 29, 2002 (aged 71); Westwood, Los Angeles, California, U.S.
- Occupation: Poet
- Spouse: Philomene Long
- Website: www.raven-productions.com

John Thomas Idlet (John Thomas) (December 31, 1930 – March 29, 2002) was an American Beat poet who wrote sporadically and had an aversion to publishing his work and work in general. Charles Bukowski called him "the best unread poet in America."

== Early life ==
John Thomas Idlet was born in Baltimore in 1930, the son of a teacher and World War I veteran who claimed to have invented the "double header" ice-cream cone. His father later committed suicide. Thomas attended Loyola College and described being "poisoned by Thomas Wolfe at an early age". After school, he considered entering the priesthood, but instead served in the Air Force during the Korean War, working as cryptographer due to his very high IQ. He was a huge man; 6 feet and 4 inches tall, and 300 pounds, the writer John Arthur Maynard described him "a cut-down version of Paul Bunyan – huge bones, huge ribcage, menacing brow, and beard". After his discharge in 1954, he married, had children and worked as a taxi driver, psychiatric orderly and city worker, while writing never completed novels. Despite a hatred of computers, he later became a computer programmer. He required time off following a truck accident, in which he broke his ankle. During his convalescence, he began to write and grew a beard, which he refused to shave off when he returned to work. As a result, he was fired from his job, and was forced to work mixing powders and cleaning vats in his wife's lover's paint factory. Having read Lawrence Lipton's book Holy Barbarians (1959), Thomas sold his books for $20, abandoned his family, and hitchhiked to California. A driver of a Cadillac picked him up outside Pittsburgh and took him to Beverly Hills. Thomas took a bus to Venice Beach, where he lived for the rest of his life.

== Venice beat years ==
At Venice Beach Thomas worked as the manager and chef of the Gas House, a project which aimed to provide free meals to poets and artists who were living rent-free at the Grand Hotel Menus were planned based on the amount of money gathered in a gallon jar by tourists who had ogled the beatniks during the day. Ingenuity was needed, and Thomas used cheap fish, and "filet mignon", which as actually horse meat bought from a local pet store. Thomas declared himself a writer, but when the poet Maurice Lacy asked what specifically he wrote, he replied unthinkingly, "I'm a poet". As a result, he was obliged to write some poems, and was learned much about the craft from the poet Stuart Perkoff. Poetry came more easily than the novels, but even poetry was a struggle for the writer, and "NOT writing and deep inability to write became his central theme if not celebrity". As he wrote in "Apologia"

"I think maybe today a poem I hope

after breakfast I start trying
pulling it out of my own gut

mostly by force"

He recognized that he had always wanted to be a man who had written books, rather wanting to do the actual work of writing. He admitted that his earlier "novel-writing ambition was just sheer, vulgar pretense, wanting to be a great man."

Thomas was member of Venice beats, a little-known group described as "an outlaw strain in Southern California letters", by the historian John Arthur Maynard. The Venice beats were outsiders who rejected popular culture and fame, preferring lives of poverty and art. According to Maynard, instead of wanting to change the world like other beats, "[w]hat they really wanted to do was to write their poems, paint their paintings, take their drugs, love their friends and keep from getting busted by the police." Thomas was highly sexually active and "a great connoisseur of fellatio, threesomes and communal erotic activity". In early 1970s, he invited his 15-year-old daughter, he had not seen for 12 years, to visit, gave her drugs and engaged in oral sex with her.

Thomas was a key founding member of the "Venice West Foot Stamping & Poem Eating Society", which met at the Venice West Coffee House. Though planned, the group never produced a planned magazine, due to lack of funds. Thomas' abandoned wife sued him for non-support and he had to escape to San Francisco to avoid the police. On his return, Thomas taught classes at the Free University of California, hosted at the Pot-Pourri Coffee House.

Thomas' first collection of poems, Apologia was published in 1972 in a limited edition of 405 copies. Thirty of the copies numbered, signed, and "sealed" by the author, presumably so they could not be read. Four years later Thomas published Epopoeia and the Decay of Satire which consisted of the same works, except that some of the poems in the first collection had been deleted from the second.

For most of the 1970s and early 1980s he stopped writing poetry at all, and instead "listen[ed] to the trees" and write a journal. Thomas published another collection of poetry, "Abandoned Latitudes" in 1983. Idlet's poem "The Ghosts of the Poets" is engraved on wall of the Venice boardwalk.

== Later years ==
Thomas met his fourth wife, the poet Philomene Long in 1983 at a poetry reading. The couple were inseparable in his last years, and Thomas dedicated his final poems to her. He also relied on her financially, bragging that he didn’t have to work to his good friend Charles Bukowski. In fact, John Thomas is ONLY remembered at all for his friendship with Bukowski.

He said she "resurrected him." They lived together on the edge of American society, maintaining a lifestyle of "living poor" based on the ancient Zen recluse poets. "I would feel uncomfortable and irritable living any other way. I have Philomene, a pen, a pad, shirt and pants. If you start wanting more, it fills you up, leading to a poverty of the heart and mind."

Thomas spent the sunset days of his life in his house in Venice Beach and reading while sitting under a sweet gum tree on the grounds of the Zen Center of Los Angeles.

In 2002, Idlet pleaded no contest to a charge of unlawful sexual contact with his 15-year-old daughter in the 1970s, and was sentenced to 120 days in jail. Less than 3 weeks into his sentence, Thomas died of congestive heart failure at the age of 71 in the USC Los Angeles County Medical Center. More precisely, he died on the cold, hard floor of a cell in a pool of his own vomit. In 2007, the Los Angeles County Sheriff's Department settled a lawsuit brought by his widow for $475,000. The lawsuit alleged that the prison system did not provide him adequate medical care, including failing to have him seen by a doctor despite evident poor health.

== Legacy ==
Thomas's poetry was praised for its grace and clarity, and he was an exceptional reader of his own work. He was influenced by Ezra Pound, the Chinese poet Li Po, and the philosopher Ludwig Wittgenstein. His poetry demonstrated his wide reading and immense imagination in spare, uncluttered forms. He was an exacting and ruthless critic of the work of others, which made him unpopular with others at times. Neeli Cherkovski described him as "by far the greatest underground poet in Los Angeles for the last 35, 40 years". Poet and editor Paul Vangelisti, who knew him well, remembered that "He was a gadfly in a time of self-mythologies. John made us understand what's going on inside the mind can have nothing to do with what's going on outside. John made no bones." "

=== Poetry ===
- Epopoeia and the Decay of Satire. Los Angeles: Red Hill Press, 1976.
- Abandoned Latitudes: New Writing by Three Los Angeles Poets, Los Angeles: Invisible City/Red Hill Press (1983)
- The Book of Sleep. John Thomas and Philomene Long. Momentum Press, 1991.
- "You'll Despise Me For this, But I'm Going To Say It Anyway" contained in The Outlaw Bible of American Poetry. New York: Thunder's Mouth Press, 1999.
- Feeding The Animal. Poetry by John Thomas. Lummox Press, 2001.
- Our Life: The One Secret, Philomene, That Surprises Death. Audio recording. Produced by Raven Productions. CD Amazon, 2002.
- The Selected Poems and Prose of John Thomas. Venice, CA. Raven Productions / Press. www.raven-productions.com, 2011.
