= John Henry Thomas (shipping) =

John Henry Thomas (1869 – May 17, 1931) was a leader in the American shipping industry, and director of the Port of New York during World War I, when he supervised supply ships.

== Birth and family ==
John H. Thomas was born in St. Mary's County, Maryland, to Captain George Thomas (1835–1903) and Ellen Ogle (Beall) Thomas (1841–1909). His paternal grandfather was Richard Thomas (1797–1849), who served as President of the Maryland Senate. In 1916 he married Margaret Hale (1881–1971).

== Career ==
John H. Thomas got his start in the shipping business with Furness Withy & Company at the Port of Baltimore. He relocated to New York City in 1896.

During World War I, he served as civilian director of the Port of New York and New Jersey. As director, he controlled most of the docks in Manhattan, Brooklyn, and New Jersey, subordinating all private business to facilitate the movement of troops and supplies to the war zone.

After the war, he became vice-president of the International Mercantile Marine Company, a shipping trust founded by J. P. Morgan. Thomas was often quoted in the press as the public face for the company. Due to poor health, he retired from this position on December 31, 1930.

== Death ==
He died in New York City on May 17, 1931, and is buried in Trinity Church Cemetery, St. Mary's, Maryland.

== Legacy ==
The World War II Liberty ship SS John H. Thomas, named for him, was launched on February 5, 1944.
