= Arcadia Sawmill and Arcadia Cotton Mill =

- U.S. National Register of Historic Places
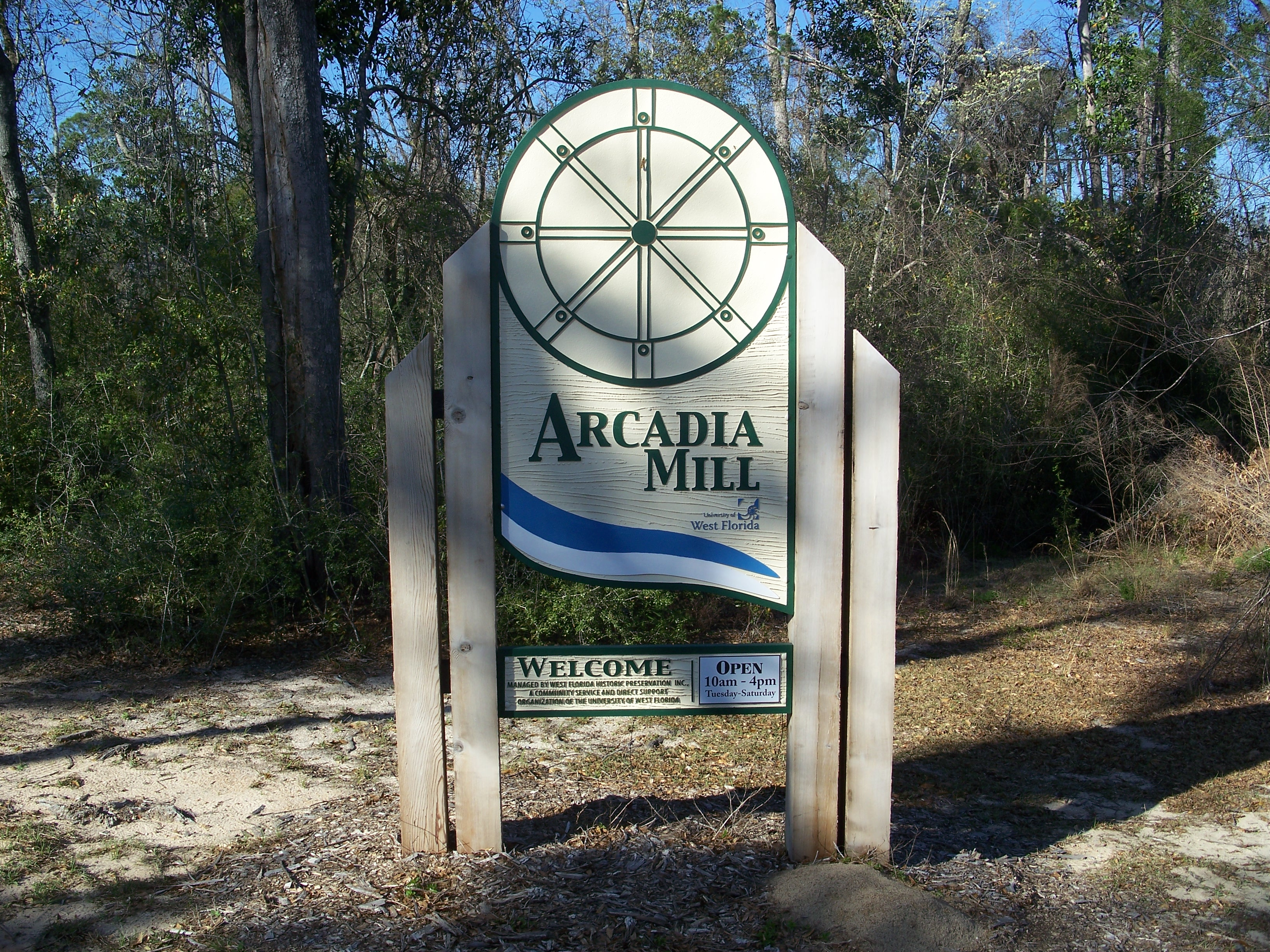
- Entrance to the site

- Location within Florida Location within the United States
- Nearest city: Milton, Florida
- Coordinates: 30°36′35″N 87°5′3″W
- NRHP reference No.: 87001300
- Added to NRHP: August 3, 1987

The Arcadia Sawmill and Arcadia Cotton Mill (also known as the Arcadia Mill Site or Escambia Manufacturing Company) is a historic site a mile southwest of Milton, Florida, United States. On August 3, 1987, it was added to the U.S. National Register of Historic Places.

The remains of the 19th century industrial water-powered mill complex are now part of the Arcadia Mill Archaeological Site, which is managed by the West Florida Historic Preservation. There is a visitor center and museum with exhibits about the site, and an elevated boardwalk through the archaeological remains of the complex and adjacent swamp.

The West Florida Historic Preservation, part of the University of West Florida, also manages Historic Pensacola Village, the Pensacola Museum of History, and the Pensacola Historical Society.

== History ==
The land encompassing Arcadia Mill was originally owned by Juan de la Rua, the Spanish mayor of Pensacola. Joseph Forsyth, founder of the Bagdad Community, purchased de la Rua's land in 1828, building a sawmill and expanding upon the small dam that de la Rua had built. Forsyth partnered with brothers Andrew and Ezekiel Simpson to establish the mill. Manufacturing tycoon Timothy Twitchell established a large complex near Arcadia, including production of shingles, silk, and buckets.

The lumber was transferred via mule railroad or log flume to the nearby Blackwater River. The mule railroad was operated by the Arcadia Railroad Company. The company was founded by Forsyth, the Simpsons, and Twitchell in 1838.

Forsyth and the Simpsons moved their lumber mills to Bagdad in 1840 due to transportation issues. The mills at Arcadia were replaced with a cotton mill (operated by the Forsyth and Simpson Firm) ran by slave labor. The Arcadia Mill was the largest cotton mill in the newly-incorporated state of Florida by the early 1850s. Arcadia functioned as a small community, including shops, a quarry, living quarters, tannery, blacksmith, and a well. Furthermore, along with the cotton mill, Arcadia included a gristmill.

Arcadia Mill's downfall began in the mid-1850s. Joseph Forsyth died on March 10, 1855. The cotton mill was abandoned in later that year after it was largely destroyed in a fire. Twitchell relocated his mills to Bagdad. The civil war destroyed a large portion of what remained of the abandoned industrial complex, as the Confederate army blew it up to prevent the Union from revitalizing it. Arcadia remained abandoned for 109 years until it was rediscovered by Warren Weekes in 1964.
