= John Thomas (baseball) =

American baseball player

- Outfielder

Negro league baseball debut
- 1946, for the Birmingham Black Barons

Last appearance
- 1947, for the Birmingham Black Barons

Teams
- Birmingham Black Barons (1946–1947)

John Thomas is an American former Negro league baseball outfielder who played in the 1940s.

Thomas played for the Birmingham Black Barons in 1946 and again the following season. In six recorded games, he posted seven hits in 26 plate appearances.
