= William Henry DeWitt =

American politician (1827–1896)

William Henry DeWitt (October 24, 1827 – April 11, 1896) was a prominent Tennessee politician.

DeWitt was born in Smith County, Tennessee. He was largely self-educated, but studied briefly at Berea Academy near Chapel Hill, Tennessee. In 1847 he became a teacher, teaching for one year at Montpelier Academy in Gainesboro, Tennessee (1847–1848), then for two years in Jackson County, Tennessee (1848–1850), and finally for one year in Lafayette, Tennessee. He taught himself law, and was licensed to practice law in Lafayette in November 1850. He practiced law for several years in Lafayette and later (1856–1858) in Lebanon, Tennessee. During this period he was elected to the Tennessee House of Representatives, where he represented Smith, Macon, and Sumner counties in 1855–1856. From 1858 to 1875, he made his home in Carthage, Tennessee, then moved to Chattanooga in 1875.

In the years before the Civil War, DeWitt was a Whig. He represented the state in the Provisional Confederate Congress from 1861 to 1862. After the Civil War, he became a Democrat. In 1872 he served as a state court judge. Former United States Secretary of the Treasury, William Gibbs McAdoo, studied law under Judge DeWitt.
