= Philomene Long =

American poet

- Born: August 17, 1940; New York City, New York, U.S.
- Died: August 21, 2007 (aged 67); Venice, California, U.S.
- Occupation: Poet
- Spouse: Poet John Thomas
- Children: 2
- Writing career
- Genre: Poetry
- Notable works: "The Queen of Bohemia," "The Ghosts of Venice West," "American Zen Bones, Maezumi Roshi Stories," a prose work about the founder of the Zen Center of Los Angeles

Philomene Long (August 17, 1940 – August 21, 2007) was an American poet. Long was born in Greenwich Village, New York City. From the 1960s onward, she lived most of her life in Venice, California. In 2005, she was made Poet Laureate of Venice.

Twin sister Pegarty Long is a producer and director, known for the films An Irish Vampire in Hollywood (2013) and Incision (1999)
