= Provisional Congress of the Confederate States =

Legislature of the Provisional Government of the Confederate States

- Flag of the Confederate States (1861–1863)

Type
- Type: Unicameral

History
- Founded: February 4, 1861
- Disbanded: February 17, 1862
- Succeeded by: Confederate States Congress

Leadership
- President: Howell Cobb

Meeting place
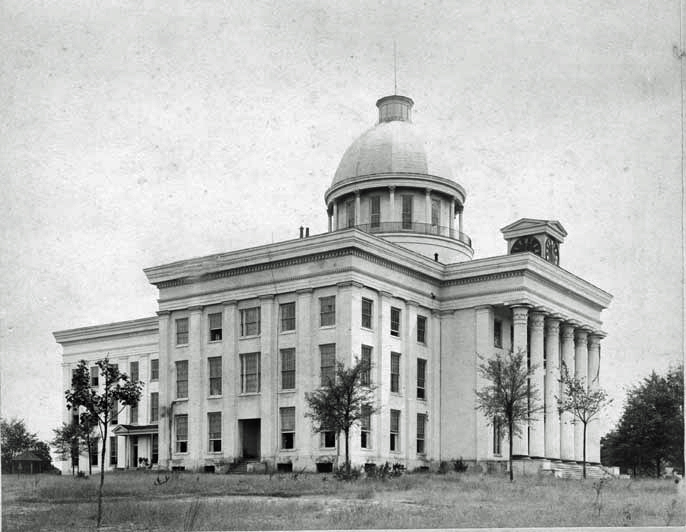
- Alabama State Capitol; Montgomery, Alabama; Confederate States of America
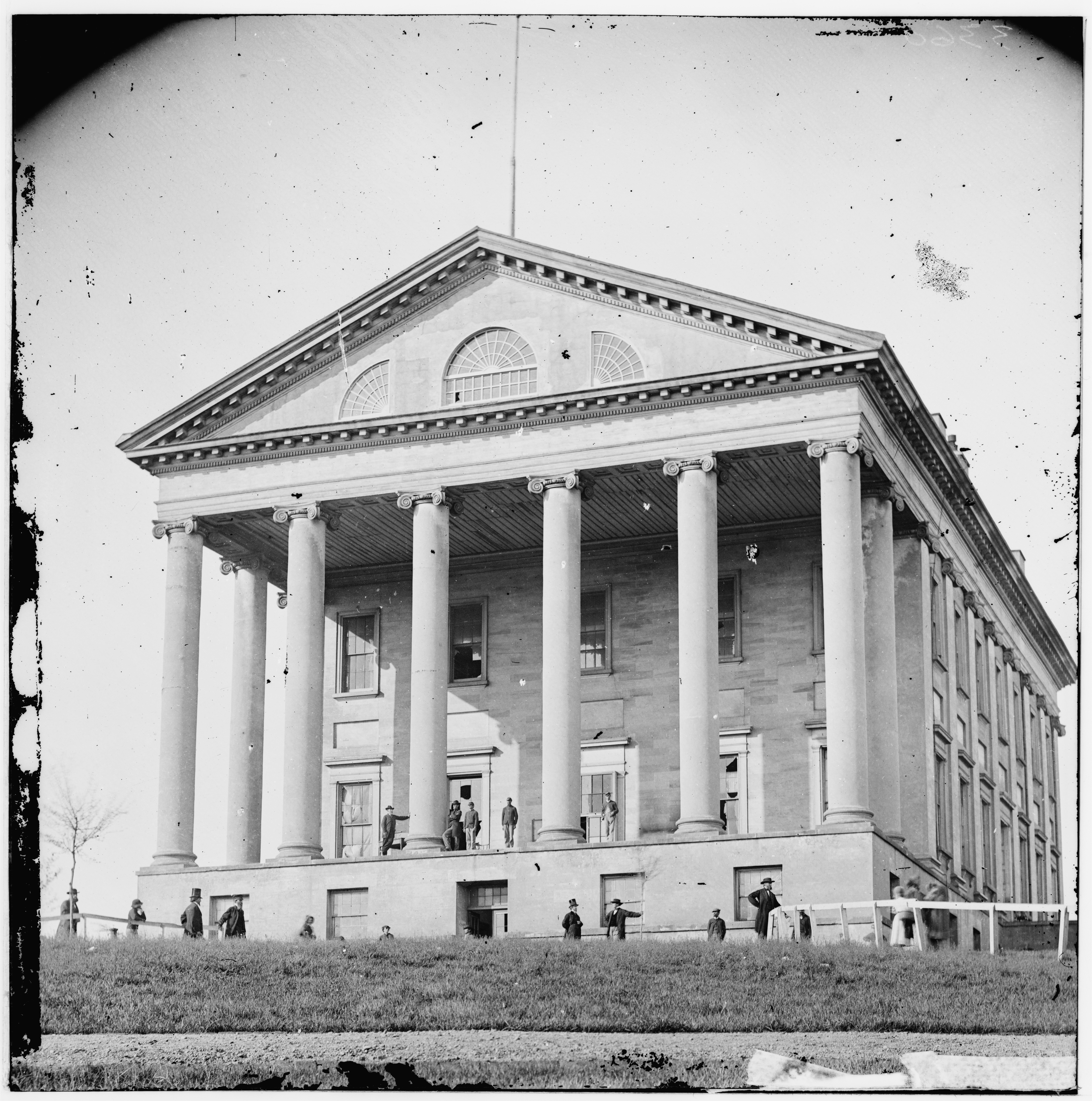
- Virginia State Capitol; Richmond, Virginia; Confederate States of America

Constitution
- Constitution for the Provisional Government of the Confederate States

The Provisional Congress of the Confederate States, fully the Provisional Congress of the Confederate States of America, was a unicameral congress of deputies and delegates called together from the Southern States which became the governing body of the Provisional Government of the Confederate States from February 4, 1861, to February 17, 1862. It sat in Montgomery, Alabama, until May 21, 1861, when it adjourned to meet in Richmond, Virginia, on July 20, 1861. In both cities, it met in the existing state capitols which it shared with the respective secessionist state legislatures. It added new members as other separatist states seceded from the Union and directed the election on November 6, 1861, at which a permanent government was elected.

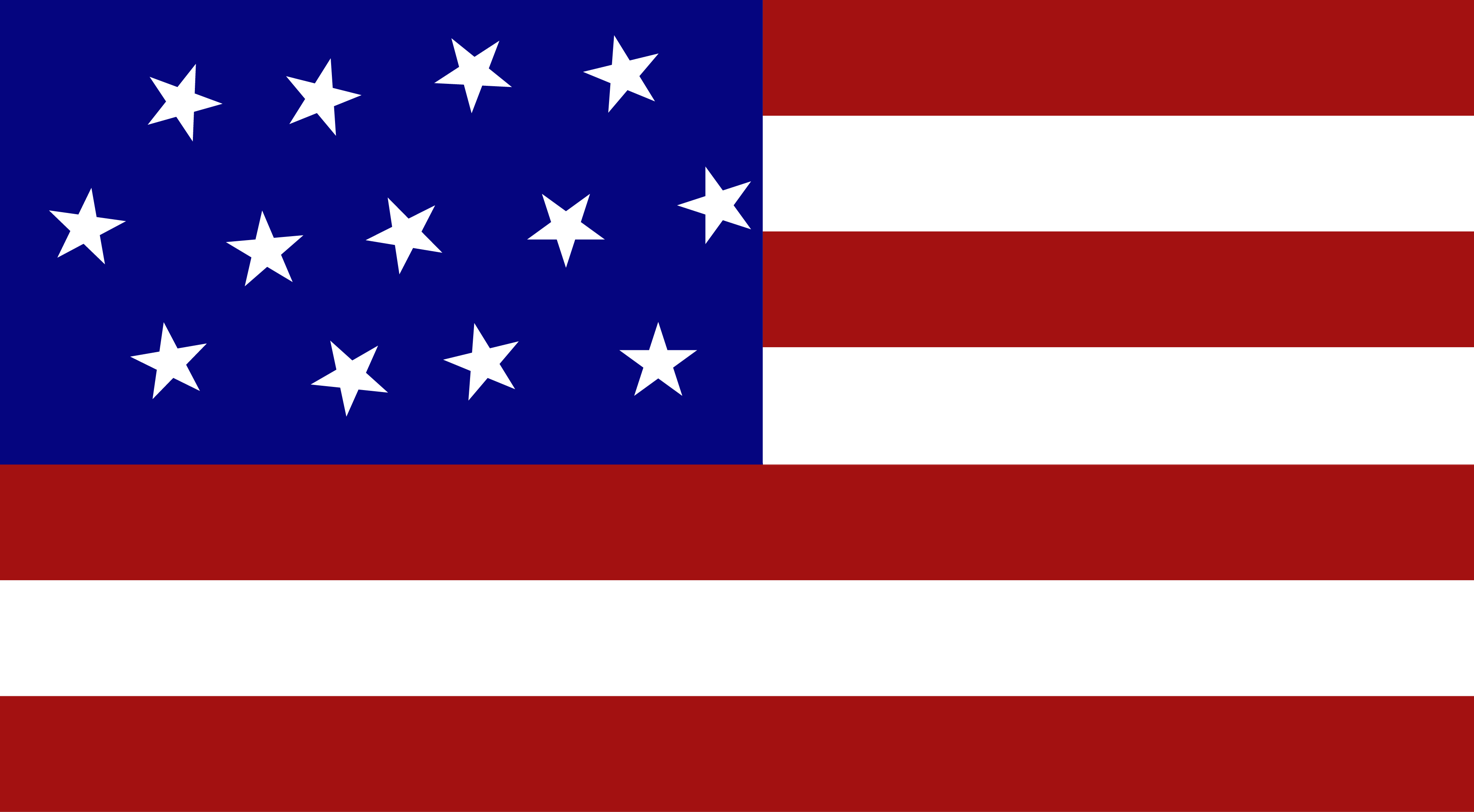
Digital remake of the flag used to represent the provisional government

== First Session ==
The First Session of the Provisional Congress was held at Montgomery from February 4, 1861, to March 16, 1861. Members were present from Alabama, Florida, Georgia, Louisiana, Mississippi, South Carolina, and Texas. It drafted a provisional constitution and set up a government. For president and vice president, it selected Jefferson Davis of Mississippi and Alexander H. Stephens of Georgia.

=== Constitutional Convention ===
The Confederate States Constitutional Convention was held at Montgomery from February 28, 1861, to March 11, 1861.

== Second Session ==
The Second Session of the Provisional Congress was held at Montgomery from April 29, 1861, to May 21, 1861. Members were present from Alabama, Florida, Georgia, Louisiana, Mississippi, South Carolina, Texas, Virginia, and Arkansas.

== Third Session ==
The Third Session of the Provisional Congress was held at Richmond from July 20, 1861, to August 31, 1861. Members were present from Alabama, Florida, Georgia, Louisiana, Mississippi, South Carolina, Texas, Virginia, Arkansas, North Carolina, and Tennessee.

== Fourth Session ==
The Fourth Session of the Provisional Congress was held at Richmond on September 3, 1861. Members were present from Alabama, Florida, Georgia, Louisiana, Mississippi, South Carolina, Texas, Virginia, Arkansas, North Carolina, and Tennessee.

== Fifth Session ==
The Fifth Session of the Provisional Congress was held at Richmond from November 18, 1861, to February 17, 1862. Members were present from Alabama, Florida, Georgia, Louisiana, Mississippi, South Carolina, Texas, Virginia, Arkansas, North Carolina, Tennessee, Missouri, and Kentucky. One non-voting member was present from the Arizona Territory.

== Leadership ==
President

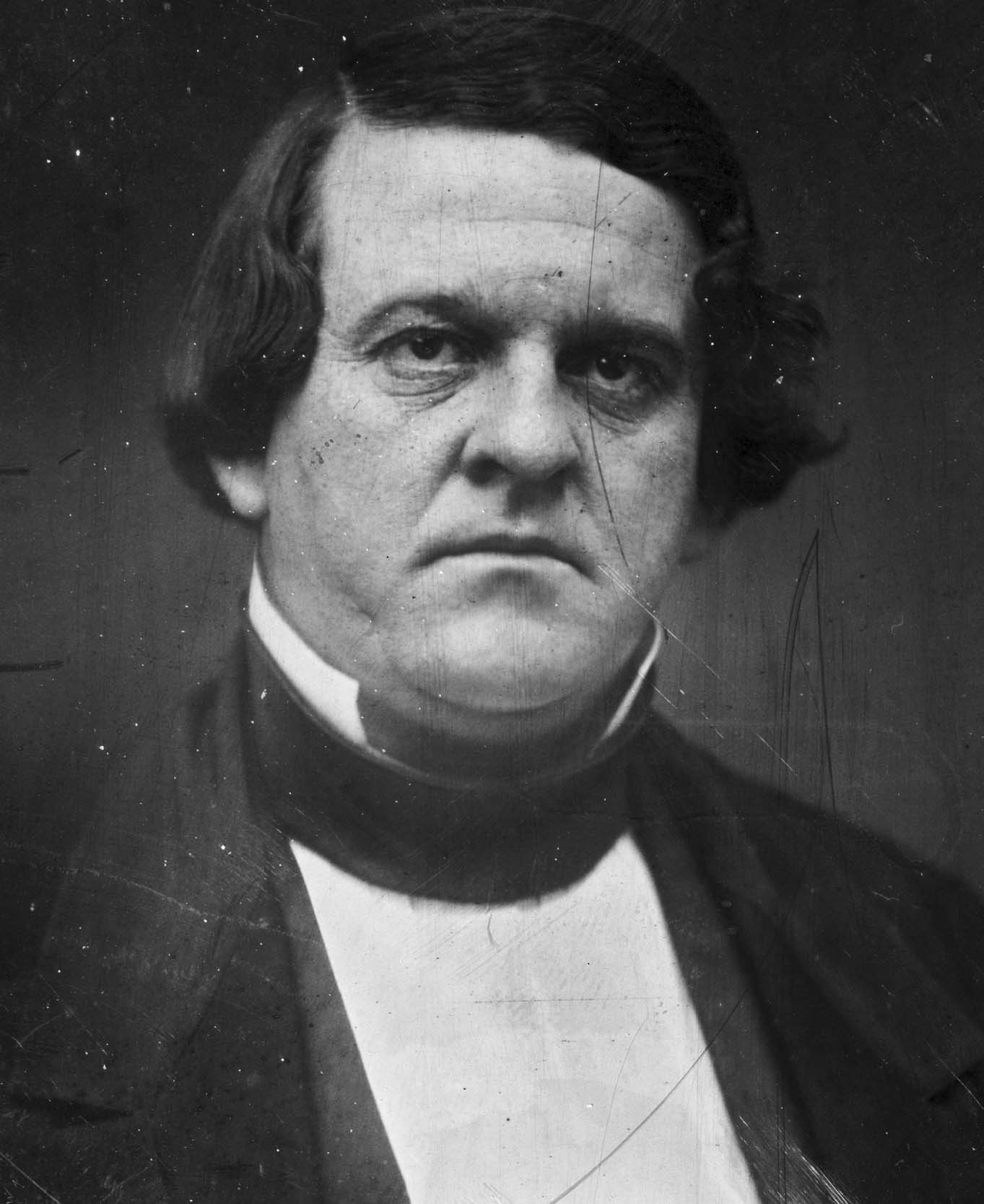
Howell Cobb

- President: Howell Cobb

== Members ==
=== Deputies ===
Deputies from the first seven states to secede formed the first two sessions of the Congress.

Alabama

- Richard Wilde Walker
- Robert Hardy Smith
- Colin J. McRae
- John Gill Shorter (resigned November 1861)
  - Cornelius Robinson (took his seat on April 29, 1861 – Elected to fill vacancy; resigned January 24, 1862)
- William Parish Chilton
- Stephen F. Hale
- David P. Lewis (resigned April 29, 1861)
  - Nicholas Davis Jr. (took his seat on April 29, 1861 – Elected to fill vacancy)
- Thomas Fearn (resigned April 29, 1861)
  - Henry Cox Jones (took his seat on April 29, 1861 – Elected to fill vacancy)
- Jabez L. M. Curry

Florida

- James Patton Anderson (resigned April 8, 1861)
  - George Taliaferro Ward (took his seat on May 2, 1861 – Elected to fill vacancy; resigned February 5, 1862)
  - John Pease Sanderson (took his seat on February 5, 1862 – Appointed to fill vacancy)
- James Byeram Owens
- Jackson Morton (took his seat on February 6, 1861)

Georgia

- Robert Toombs
- Howell Cobb
- Francis S. Bartow (killed July 21, 1861 at the First Battle of Bull Run)
  - Thomas Marsh Forman (took his seat on August 7, 1861 – Appointed to fill vacancy)
- Martin J. Crawford
- E. A. Nisbet (resigned December 10, 1861)
  - Nathan Henry Bass Sr. (took his seat on January 14, 1862 – Appointed to fill vacancy)
- Benjamin Harvey Hill
- Augustus R. Wright
- Thomas Reade Rootes Cobb
- Augustus Holmes Kenan
- Alexander H. Stephens

Louisiana

- John Perkins Jr.
- Alexandre Etienne de Clouet
- Charles Magill Conrad
- Duncan F. Kenner
- Edward Sparrow
- Henry Marshall

Mississippi

- Alexander M. Clayton (resigned May 11, 1861)
  - Alexander Blackburn Bradford (took his seat on December 5, 1861 – Elected to fill vacancy)
- James Thomas Harrison
- William S. Barry
- J. A. P. Campbell
- Wiley P. Harris
- Walker Brooke
- William Sydney Wilson (resigned April 29, 1861)
  - Jehu Amaziah Orr (took his seat on April 29, 1861 – Elected to fill vacancy)

South Carolina

- Robert Barnwell Rhett
- Robert Woodward Barnwell
- Christopher Gustavus Memminger
- James Chesnut Jr.
- William Porcher Miles
- Laurence M. Keitt
- Thomas Jefferson Withers (resigned May 21, 1861 after second session)
  - James Lawrence Orr (took his seat on February 17, 1862 – Appointed to fill vacancy)
- William W. Boyce

Texas

- John Gregg (took his seat on February 15, 1861)
- Thomas Neville Waul (took his seat on February 19, 1861)
- Williamson Simpson Oldham (took his seat on March 2, 1861)
- John H. Reagan (took his seat on March 2, 1861)
- John Hemphill (took his seat on March 2, 1861; died January 4, 1862)
- William Beck Ochiltree (took his seat on March 2, 1861)
- Louis Wigfall (took his seat on March 2, 1861)

=== Delegates ===
Representatives from states that seceded after the Battle of Fort Sumter were referred to as delegates, in contrast to the deputies from the original seven states, even though they all had the same obligations.

Arkansas

- Augustus Hill Garland
- Robert Ward Johnson
- Albert Rust
- Hugh French Thomason
- William Wirt Watkins

Kentucky

- Henry Cornelius Burnett
- Theodore Legrand Burnett
- John Milton Elliott
- George Washington Ewing
- Samuel Howard Ford
- George Baird Hodge
- Thomas Johnson
- Thomas Bell Monroe
- John J. Thomas
- Daniel Price White

Missouri

- Caspar Wistar Bell
- John Bullock Clark Sr.
- Aaron H. Conrow
- William Mordecai Cooke Sr.
- Thomas W. Freeman
- Thomas Alexander Harris
- Robert Ludwell Yates Peyton
- George Graham Vest
- Delegate-elect Hyer never took his seat

North Carolina

- William Waightstill Avery
- Francis Burton Craige
- Allen Turner Davidson
- George Davis
- Thomas David Smith McDowell
- John Motley Morehead
- Richard Clauselle Puryear
- Thomas Hart Ruffin
- William N. H. Smith
- Abraham Watkins Venable

Tennessee

- John DeWitt Clinton Atkins
- Robert Looney Caruthers
- David Maney Currin
- William Henry DeWitt
- John Ford House
- Thomas McKissick Jones
- James Houston Thomas

Virginia

- Thomas Salem Bocock
- Alexander Boteler
- John White Brockenbrough
- Gideon D. Camden (resigned June 1861)
- Robert M. T. Hunter
- Robert Johnston
- William Hamilton MacFarland
- James M. Mason
- Walter Preston
- William Ballard Preston
- Roger Atkinson Pryor
- William Cabell Rives
- Charles Wells Russell
- Robert Eden Scott
- James Alexander Seddon
- Waller Redd Staples
- John Tyler (died January 18, 1862)

Arizona Territory

- Granville Henderson Oury

== Notes ==
New constituency	Provisional Congress of the Confederate States; February 4, 1861 – February 17, 1862	Succeeded by Confederate States Congress
