= Alexander Blackburn Bradford =

American politician (1799–1873)

Alexander Blackburn Bradford (June 2, 1799 – July 10, 1873) was a politician and public figure in both Tennessee and Mississippi.

== Early life, education, and career ==
He was born on June 2, 1799, in Jefferson County, Tennessee, the son of East Tennessee pioneers and grandson of two Revolutionary War veterans. After studying law at the University of Tennessee, he served as a senate clerk under James K. Polk in the Thirteenth General Assembly of Tennessee. He was only twenty years old at the time.

In 1821, Bradford moved to Jackson, Tennessee, becoming one of its first settlers. On November 14 of that year, he was admitted to the bar of the first Circuit Court of Madison County. He was soon thereafter named first district attorney, at the time called solicitor general, for the Western District of Tennessee. In 1834, Bradford served as one of two prosecuting attorneys in the trial of John A. Murrell, one of the most notorious criminals of the early South. In 1821, Bradford married Darthula Miller, the daughter of Chancellor Pleasant Miller and granddaughter of Governor William Blount. One of Bradford's three daughters, named for her mother, married Captain Henry E. Williamson, CSA.

In addition to being a well-known lawyer, Bradford was a gifted military commander. In 1831, he was elected brigadier-general of the 14th Brigade, Tennessee Militia (the equivalent of today's National Guard). Two years later, he was elected major general of the Western District of Tennessee.

In 1836, Osceola, Chief of the Seminole Indians, led an uprising known as the Second Seminole War. Bradford volunteered for the war in Florida enlisting as a private; he was soon elected Colonel. He received praise during the war for leading a charge at the battle at Withlacooche River. Also, in 1836, he organized and was commander of the "Madison Grays," a company of Tennessee volunteers to aid the beleaguered Texans in the War for Texas Independence.

== Political career ==
After the Florida war, Bradford returned to Tennessee, where he was elected to a term in the Tennessee State Senate in 1837. In 1839, he moved to Holly Springs, Mississippi, where he set up a law practice and was the owner of the Holly Springs & State Line Railroad Company. He was elected to the legislature, representing Marshall County, Mississippi, in 1841 and again in 1852. In the 1847 gubernatorial election, he was defeated as the Whig Party candidate for governor of Mississippi. In 1852, he lost a bid for the United States House of Representatives.

When the United States declared war against Mexico in 1846, Bradford heeded the call to arms and volunteered for the Mississippi militia. On June 18, 1846, an election was held to determine who would be the commanding officer. Bradford received 350 votes. Jefferson Davis was next with 300 votes. Bradford refused the election stating "no man should take command of this regiment without that full confidence." A second ballot was held and Davis was elected by a plurality of some 147 votes out of more than 900 ballots. Bradford was appointed major and served as third in command.

During the Mexican War, Bradford was conspicuous for bravery. Following the Battle of Monterrey, Bradford recalled, "I was in all of the fight, saw everything and was exposed fifteen hours to cannon balls, grape canister and musketry, grazed seven times but escaped unhurt." At the Battle of Buena Vista, both Col. McClung and Jefferson Davis had been wounded, which added to their glory and publicity. This was more than the fiery little Bradford could stand and he rushed up and down the lines, waving his arms in the air and exclaiming, "My God! Can't one bullet hit me?"

At Buena Vista, Bradford was appalled when he thought the Mississippi Regiment was retreating. Not having heard Davis' order to retire, Bradford was reported to have called out in a most excited manner, "Shoot me! … Ah, kill me! The Mississippi Regiment has run and I'll be damned if I want to live another minute!" Davis' order was transmitted to Bradford and shortly thereafter the Mississippi Regiment reformed and started an advance that carried the day.

Jefferson Davis was highly appreciative of Bradford's military expertise. After Buena Vista, Davis reported: "To Major Bradford I offer my thanks for the prompt and credible manner in which he executed all the orders I gave him, and especially refer to the delicate duty assigned him of restoring order among the files of another regiment when rendered unsteady by the fire of the enemy's artillery."

After the war, Bradford returned to Holly Springs. In honor of his military service, the citizens of Marshall County, Mississippi, presented Bradford with a ceremonial sword which bears the names "Withlacoochee," "Monterrey," and "Buena Vista." In 1852, he moved to Bolivar County, Mississippi where he established a plantation, Bradford Place. In 1861, he was elected to the Provisional Confederate Congress. After his term, Bradford did not seek reelection but was again elected to the Mississippi Legislature in 1863 and 1864 representing Bolivar County. The end of the Civil War left Bradford impoverished, but he was able to recoup some of his losses by practicing law in Bolivar County.

== Personal life and death ==
Bradford died in the summer of 1873. His obituary, published in the Memphis Sunday Appeal on July 13, 1873, states in part, "His later years have been passed in comparative retirement, partly with his children at Holly Springs, to whom he was almost an idol, and partly in Bolivar County where his property is situated. General Bradford was remarkable for independence, honesty, frankness, and truth. Of a strikingly handsome person and military carriage, he bore the weight of years with unbent form and with the proud, firm step of a born soldier. His eagle eye flashed with the same fire at the age of seventy-three as when he charged the Indian hammocks in 1836, and the Mexican batteries in 1847. No reverses ever subdued him; no dangers ever appalled him."

Bradford had four children, Darthula, wife of General Henry E. Williamson; Malvina, who died as a child; Mary, wife of Edward W. Upshaw; and Edmund. Bradford is buried at Hillcrest Cemetery in Holly Springs, Mississippi.
