= Provisional Constitution of the Confederate States =

First constitution of the Confederate States (1861–1862)

Overview
- Jurisdiction: Confederate States of America
- Created: February 8, 1861
- Date effective: February 8, 1861

Government structure
- Branches: 3
- Chambers: Unicameral
- Executive: President
- Judiciary: Supreme, Districts

History
- First legislature: February 8, 1862
- First executive: February 18, 1861
- Amendments: 1
- Last amended: May 21, 1861
- Location: American Civil War Museum, Richmond, Virginia, U.S.
- Author: Christopher Memminger et al.
- Signatories: 50 of the 50 delegates to the Montgomery Convention

The Provisional Constitution of the Confederate States, formally the Constitution for the Provisional Government of the Confederate States of America, was an agreement among all seven original states in the Confederate States of America that served as its first constitution. Its drafting by a committee of twelve appointed by the Provisional Congress began on February 5, 1861. The Provisional Constitution was formally adopted on February 8. Government under this constitution was superseded by the new Constitution of the Confederate States with a permanent form of government "organized on the principles of the United States" on February 22, 1862.

== Background and context ==
On February 4, 1861, in Montgomery, Alabama, deputies to a "Congress of the Sovereign and Independent States of South Carolina, Georgia, Florida, Alabama, Mississippi, and Louisiana" met to set about creating a new form of government based on that of the United States. Their efforts resulted in, among other achievements, the drafting of a provisional constitution for what came to be known as the Confederate States of America.

Before the congress could accomplish anything, it required a set of guidelines to follow. On February 5, Christopher Memminger proposed the creation of a Committee of Thirteen to draft a provisional constitution to grant congressional power to the convention. Thomas Cobb, of Georgia, moved for the committee to be twelve, with two members from each state delegation. The Convention settled on the latter by nominating Memminger and Robert Barnwell from South Carolina, William Barry and Wiley Harris from Mississippi, James Anderson and James Owens from Florida, Richard Walker and Robert Smith from Alabama, Alexander Stephens and Eugenius Nisbet from Georgia, and John Perkins and Duncan Kenner from Louisiana to the Committee of Twelve. The committee elected Memminger, who had arrived at the convention with a draft already prepared, as their chair.

== Key points and differences ==
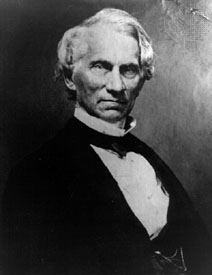
Christopher Memminger, the principal author of the Provisional Constitution

All committee members were well educated and had extensive legislative experience. The necessity of a constitution made them work with considerable speed and report to the convention on February 7. Copies were then made and distributed to the convention's members, who spent relatively little time on debate. The key changes to the committee's draft were an inclusion of the phrase "Invoking the favor of Almighty God" into the preamble, the addition of an executive line-item veto, a removal of a congressional restriction of 15% on import tariffs, and the combination of the circuit and district court systems into one district system in which each state comprised one district. The Provisional Constitution was then unanimously ratified around midnight on February 8, 1861. It was signed by all members present at noon on the day of Jefferson Davis's inaugural address, February 18, 1861. There were 50 signatures in all, including those of the Texas delegation who were admitted on March 2. The Provisional Constitution was replaced after the ratification of the permanent Constitution of the Confederate States of America, on March 11, 1861.

Since the framers of the Provisional Constitution used the U.S. Constitution as a basis for their own, there are many similarities. Large sections were copied without any change, and others had only cosmetic changes (such as replacing "United States" with "Confederate States" or "Confederacy"). There were also several noticeable differences, including the aforementioned changes, as well as a clause to allow Congress to use a two-thirds vote to declare the president unable to perform his duties. Article IV permitted Congress to amend the constitution with another two-thirds vote, and Article VI granted Congress the power to admit other states into the confederacy. In its haste, the Committee of Twelve neglected to include important features such as a ratification process and decided to omit any mention of controversial issues regarding slavery and tariffs, issues that were to be decided in the permanent constitution.

However, the most significant difference from the U.S. Constitution was that under the Provisional Constitution, the Provisional Confederate Congress was a unicameral legislature, with only one chamber, and voting was by states. That was changed to the more-familiar bicameral legislature in the permanent constitution, with senators and representatives voting individually.

Slavery was dealt with very briefly in the Provisional Constitution. Since the Provisional Constitution did not provide for a House of Representatives, the section dealing with how slaves should be counted for census purposes was omitted. Article I, Section 7, of the Provisional Constitution outlawed the overseas slave trade but allowed importation from the slaveholding U.S. states. However, Congress could ban importation of slaves from "any State not a member of this Confederacy." That differs from the U.S. Constitution in which Article I, Section 9 allows but does not require a ban on the "Migration or Importation of such Persons as any of the States now existing shall think proper to admit" effective January 1, 1808. Article IV, Section 2, of the Provisional Constitution required the return of escaped slaves, similarly to that in the U.S. Constitution. It differed by specifying who shall return the slaves ("the executive authority" of the state) and adding a requirement of financial compensation equal to the "value of the slave and all costs and expenses" in the case of "abduction or rescue" of the fugitive slave. Unlike the U.S. Constitution, the Confederate Provisional Constitution dispensed with the euphemistic phraseology of "other persons," "such persons," and "Person held to Service or Labour in one State" and forthrightly referred to them as "slaves" and "negroes."

Slavery would be additionally addressed in the Permanent Constitution. In addition to outlawing the slave trade and requiring the return of fugitive slaves, the Permanent Constitution omitted the requirement of financial compensation for slaves abducted or rescued or the specification that the states "executive authority" was responsible for the return, prevented Congress from passing any law "denying or impairing the right of property in negro slaves;" guaranteed the right of "transit and sojourn... with their slaves and other property;" required any Confederate territory to allow "the institution of negro slavery, as it now exists in the Confederate States"; and restored the Three-Fifths Clause for allocating representatives and direct taxes.

== Interpretations ==
In his inaugural address, President Jefferson Davis said: "We have changed the constituent parts but not the system of government. The Constitution framed by our fathers is that of these Confederate States." It differed "only from that of our fathers insofar as it is explanatory of their well-known intent...." Some scholars agree with Davis that the Provisional Constitution sought to clarify many of the ambiguities of the U.S. Constitution. The language of the former leads most historians to view the Provisional Constitution as emphasizing federalism over a consolidated, centralized federal government. For instance, in its preamble, "We the people" was replaced with "We, the deputies of the sovereign and independent States,...." Words such as "delegated" and "expressly granted" were also used to de-emphasize the power of the federal government and to underscore that the Confederacy was a league of states rather than a single homogeneity: the sovereign power resided within a framework that was "bottom-up," not "top-down."

== Signers ==
The signers and the states they represented were:

- Howell Cobb, President of the Congress
- South Carolina: R. Barnwell Rhett, R. W. Barnwell, James Chesnut, Jr., C. G. Memminger, Wm. Porcher Miles, Laurence M. Keitt, William W. Boyce, Tho. J. Withers
- Georgia: R. Toombs, Francis S. Bartow, Martin J. Crawford, E. A. Nisbet, Benjamin H. Hill, Augustus R. Wright, Thos. R. R. Cobb, A. H. Kenan, Alexander H. Stephens
- Florida: Jackson Morton, Jas. B. Owens, J. Patton Anderson
- Alabama: Richard W. Walker, Robt. H. Smith, Colin J. McRae, Jno. Gill Shorter, William Parish Chilton, Stephen F. Hale, David P. Lewis, Tho. Fearn, J. L. M. Curry
- Mississippi: W. P. Harris, Alex. M. Clayton, W. S. Wilson, James T. Harrison, Walker Brooke, William S. Barry, J. A. P. Campbell
- Louisiana: John Perkins, Jr., Alex. de Clouet, C. M. Conrad, Duncan F. Kenner, Edward Sparrow, Henry Marshall
- Texas: Thomas N. Waul, Williamson S. Oldham, John Gregg, John H. Reagan, W. B. Ochiltree, John Hemphill, Louis T. Wigfall

== See also ==
- Confederation
