= Alabama in the American Civil War =

Coordinates: 32.7°N 86.7°W

Alabama
- Nickname(s): "Yellowhammer State", "Heart of Dixie", "Cotton State"
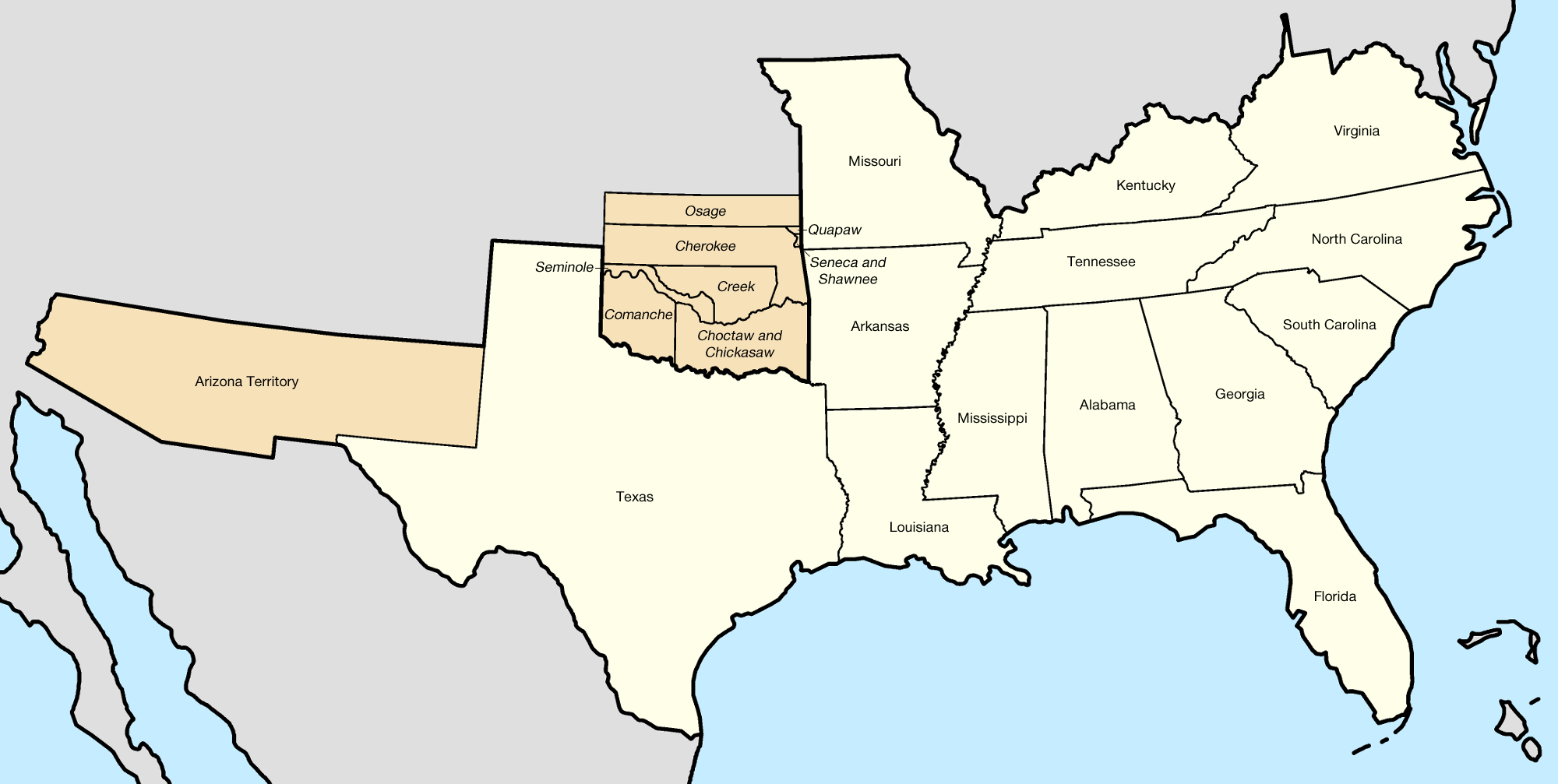
- Flag Seal Map of the Confederate States
- Capital: Montgomery
- Largest city: Mobile
- Admitted to the Confederacy: March 13, 1861 (1st)
- Population: 964,201 total; • 529,121 (54.88%) free; • 435,080 (45.12%) slave
- Forces supplied: Confederate States: 120,000; United States: 10,000 (7,300 black; 2,700 white) total
- Governor: Andrew B. Moore; John Gill Shorter; Thomas H. Watts (surrendered)
- Senators: Clement Claiborne Clay; Richard Wilde Walker; William Lowndes Yancey; Robert Jemison Jr.
- Representatives: List
- Restored to the Union: July 13, 1868

Alabama was central to the Civil War, with the secession convention at Montgomery, the birthplace of the Confederacy, inviting other slaveholding states to form a southern republic, during January–March 1861, and to develop new state constitutions. The 1861 Alabamian constitution granted citizenship to current U.S. residents, but prohibited import duties (tariffs) on foreign goods, limited a standing military, and as a final issue, opposed emancipation by any nation, but urged protection of African-American slaves with trials by jury, and reserved the power to regulate or prohibit the African slave trade. The secession convention invited all slaveholding states to secede, but only 7 Cotton States of the Lower South formed the Confederacy with Alabama, while the majority of slave states were in the Union at the time of the founding of the Confederacy. Congress had voted to protect the institution of slavery by passing the Corwin Amendment on March 4, 1861, but it was never ratified.

Even before secession, the governor of Alabama Andrew B. Moore defied the United States government by seizing the two federal forts at the Gulf Coast (forts Morgan and Gaines) and the arsenal at Mount Vernon in January 1861 to distribute weapons to Alabama towns. The peaceful seizure of Alabama forts preceded by three months the bombing and capture of the Union's Fort Sumter (SC) on April 12, 1861.

Alabama was politically divided, voting to secede 61–39%, with most opposition by Unionists in northern Alabama. Citizens would subsequently join Confederate forces, with some Alabamians joining Union forces. Issues of slavery also were divided, with emancipation denied, but slaves protected, allowed trial by jury same as free whites, and African Slave Trade was discouraged in the 1861 Ordinances.

Alabama provided a significant source of troops and leaders, military material, supplies, food, horses and mules. At the southern coast, the Alabama ports remained open (with Union blockades, but guarded by forts, floating mines, and obstacle paths) for almost 4 years using blockade runners, until the Battle of Mobile Bay (Aug 1864) and the Battle of Fort Blakeley (April 1865) forced Mobile to surrender the last major Confederate port.

== Secession ==
After the election of Abraham Lincoln from the anti-slavery Republican Party in 1860, plus the prior secession declarations of South Carolina, Mississippi, and Florida, Alabama delegates also voted to secede from the United States, on January 11, 1861, in order to join and form a slaveholding Southern republic, mostly of the Cotton States. The Alabama Secession Convention invited delegates from the fourteen slaveholding states to join at Montgomery, on February 11, 1861, when seven Cotton States of the Lower South formed the new republic, with Montgomery as Confederate capital and former Mississippi U.S. Senator Jefferson Davis as President of the Confederacy.

In December 1860, Stephen F. Hale, Alabama's commissioner to Kentucky, wrote a letter to that state's governor about Alabama's justification for secession. In it, he voiced support for the Dred Scott decision, condemned the Republican Party for opposing slavery, and stated that the state's secession, which would perpetuate slavery, was the only way to prevent prospective African-American freedmen, whom Hale referred to as "half-civilized Africans" from waging a race war (noting the 1804 Haiti massacre):

[I]n the South, where in many places the African race largely predominates, and, as a consequence, the two races would be continually pressing together, amalgamation, or the extermination of the one or the other, would be inevitable. Can Southern men submit to such degradation and ruin? God forbid that they should. ... [T]he election of Mr. Lincoln cannot be regarded otherwise than a solemn declaration, on the part of a great majority of the Northern people, of hostility to the South, her property and her institutions – nothing less than an open declaration of war – for the triumph of this new theory of Government destroys the property of the South, lays waste her fields, and inaugurates all the horrors of a San Domingo servile insurrection, consigning her citizens to assassinations, and her wives and daughters to pollution and violation, to gratify the lust of half-civilized Africans.

— Stephen F. Hale, letter to the Governor of Kentucky (December 1860).

At the state secession convention in January 1861, one delegate stated that the state's declaring of secession was motivated by slavery:

The question of Slavery is the rock upon which the Old Government split: it is the cause of secession.

— speaking to the Alabama Secession Convention (January 25, 1861).

In an 1861 speech delivered by Alabama politician Robert Hardy Smith, he said that the state of Alabama had left the United States over the issue of slavery. In the speech, he praised the Confederate constitution for its un-euphemistic protections of the right of its citizens to own slaves:

We have dissolved the late Union chiefly because of the negro quarrel. Now, is there any man who wished to reproduce that strife among ourselves? And yet does not he, who wished the slave trade left for the action of Congress, see that he proposed to open a Pandora's box among us and to cause our political arena again to resound with this discussion. Had we left the question unsettled, we should, in my opinion, have sown broadcast the seeds of discord and death in our Constitution. I congratulate the country that the strife has been put to rest forever, and that American slavery is to stand before the world as it is, and on its own merits. We have now placed our domestic institution, and secured its rights unmistakably, in the Constitution. We have sought by no euphony to hide its name. We have called our negroes 'slaves', and we have recognized and protected them as persons and our rights to them as property.

— Robert Hardy Smith, An Address to the Citizens of Alabama on the Constitution and Laws of the Confederate States of America (1861).

The 1861 Alabama Constitution Ordinance 20 (approved January 28, 1861) insisted the planned Confederacy oppose what it called the "African Slave Trade" and not consider to re-open the issue.

Newspapers in Alabama also supported secession to preserve slavery. According to one newspaper in Montgomery, slavery was a benevolent "religious institution" allowing care of slaves who might perish in other regions.

Upon its secession Alabama adopted a new state constitution. In it, it forbade the emancipation of slaves by the state itself, or by "any other country", such as the United States of America, which Alabama viewed itself as having left, but also the power to oppose the "African Slave Trade":

No slave in this State shall be emancipated by any act done to take effect in this State, or any other country.

— Article IV, Section 1, Constitution of the State of Alabama (1861).

== Alabama joins the war effort ==
Antebellum Governor Andrew B. Moore energetically supported the Confederate war effort. Even before hostilities began in April 1861, he seized U.S. forts on the Alabama Gulf Coast (Morgan and Gaines) and the arsenal in Mount Vernon, in January 1861, sent agents to buy rifles in the Northeast, and scoured the state for weapons. Despite strong resistance in the northern part of the state, Alabama seceded by vote 61–39 and formed the Confederate States of America. Congressman Williamson R.W. Cobb, a Unionist, pleaded for compromise. He ran for Congress, but was soundly defeated (he was subsequently elected in 1863 on a wave of anti-war sentiment, with war-weariness growing in Alabama). The new nation brushed Cobb aside and set up its provisional capital in Montgomery and selected Jefferson Davis as president. In May the Confederate government left Montgomery before the sickly season began and relocated to Richmond, Virginia, after Virginia had seceded in April 1861.

=== Transportation difficulty ===
Confederate-produced map of Biloxi Bay, Pascagoula Bay, Grand Bay, Heron Bay, Mobile Bay, Bon Secours Bay, barrier islands, rivers, towns and rail lines

Some idea of the severe logistical problems the Confederacy faced, with the capital city at Montgomery, can be seen by tracing the difficult journey into Alabama which Jefferson Davis made to the Confederacy's provisional capital from his home in Mississippi, the next state over, to assume the presidency on February 16, 1861. From his plantation on the river, he took a steamboat up the Mississippi to Vicksburg, boarded a train to Jackson, where he took another train north to Grand Junction, then a third train east to Chattanooga, Tennessee, and a fourth train southeast to Atlanta, Georgia. Yet another train took Davis west, back to the Alabama border, where a final train took him to Montgomery. He was in a hurry, but it took five days. A few months later in April 1861, the Fall of Fort Sumter took place. This event resulted in four more southern slave holding states, Virginia, Arkansas, Tennessee, and North Carolina, to secede from the Union and join the Confederacy and its war effort. The Fall of Fort Sumter also marked the beginning of fighting in the American Civil War. As the war proceeded, internal transportation became much more difficult. The Union seized the Tennessee and Mississippi rivers, burned trestles and railroad bridges, and tore up track; the frail Confederate railroad system faltered and virtually collapsed for want of repairs and replacement parts. For example, The Mobile and Ohio Railroad connected the main port at Mobile to points north, ending in Columbus, Kentucky. Historian James Doster reports that when the war ended, "Only a fourth of the rolling stock remained, and that was in bad condition. The repair shops were ruined. The 184-mile roadway from Okolona to Union City was damaged by decay and destruction of bridges, trestlework, crossties, and water stations". The port of Mobile was blockaded by the U.S. Navy, but some small, fast blockade runners got through at first, carrying out cotton and bringing in luxuries, food and munitions.

=== Weakening economy ===
At the outbreak of war, the state's economy was weak; during the war it declined further. Before the war, most people worked in agriculture. The largest industry was the railroads, followed by gristmills then sawmills. Perhaps 17% of the state's White population was in military service, but this was skewed to a much larger percentage of the economically valuable young men. The full crops planted in 1861 were harvested by those left behind, but the 1862 planting was smaller. Further, many counties suffered a drought in 1862, which further reduced harvest production.

In Coosa County, corn production was down by 150,000 bushels from 1861. Twenty counties (of 67) were unable to produce any surplus of corn. This brought hunger to families left behind by many Confederate soldiers. Wartime conditions made it difficult to move food from areas of surplus to those that were suffering.

Poverty became widespread as shortages drove up food prices. During the war, the legislature provided almost twelve million dollars in poverty relief funds. However, as the state government alleviated these needs by printing paper money not backed by any assets, the resulting massive inflation only made economic hardship worse. In 1861, the state recorded 7% of White families as indigent. In 1862 the figure was 34%, it rose to 39% the following year.

Harsh conditions at home encouraged many soldiers to desert. A November 1864 list shows some 7,994 men had left their units.

Later, bread riots hit Mobile in both April and September 1863. By 1864, roving bands of "corn women" wandered the state begging and stealing.

Due to the naval blockade of southern ports, salt began to be in short supply. The State of Alabama constructed salt works in Clarke County to harvest salt from the local salt springs. The salt was shipped to Mississippi, Georgia, and used in Alabama by the military and civilians.

== Military endeavors ==
About 10,000 slaves escaped and joined the Union Army, along with 2,700 white Alabamian men who joined Union forces. The state raised five regiments for the U.S. Army, four of them Black regiments of the United States Colored Troops.

On the opposing side, there were Confederate troops in sixty-five infantry regiments, plus sixteen cavalry and three of artillery that fought for the Confederacy. A large number of irregular and militia units were also organized locally.

Alabama was shielded by geography and Confederate troops against most major military operations, except the Battle of Mobile Bay (August 1864) and final conflicts of the War at Spanish Fort and Fort Blakeley (April 9, 1865), the last major battle of the Civil War. The state contributed about 120,000 Confederate troops, nearly all the white population capable of bearing arms. Most were recruited locally and served with men they knew, which built esprit and strengthened ties to home.

Medical conditions were severe; about 15% of Alabama's Confederate forces died of disease, and 10% from battle. Alabama had few well-equipped hospitals, but it had many women who volunteered to nurse the sick and wounded. Soldiers were poorly equipped, especially after 1863, and often resorted to pillaging the dead for boots, belts, canteens, blankets, hats, shirts and pants.

Thousands of slaves performed forced labor for the Confederate side; they took care of horses and equipment, cooked and did laundry, hauled supplies, and helped in field hospitals. Many slaves were tasked with building defensive installations, especially around Mobile, with at least five hundred dying from harsh working conditions. They graded roads, repaired railroads, drove supply wagons, and labored in iron mines, iron foundries and even in the munitions factories. As they were enslaved, their labor was involuntary, their unpaid labor was forcibly impressed from the slaveholders, many of whom resented having their slaves assigned to the war effort.

Thirty-nine Alabamians attained the ranks of general or admiral, most notably Admiral Raphael Semmes. Josiah Gorgas was the Chief of Ordnance for the Confederacy. He located new munitions plants in Selma that employed 10,000 workers until Union raiders in 1865 burned down the factories. The Selma Arsenal made most of the Confederacy's ammunition. The Selma Naval Ordnance Works manufactured artillery, turning out a cannon every five days. The Confederate Naval Yard built ships and was noted for launching the CSS Tennessee in 1863 to defend Mobile Bay. Selma's Confederate Nitre Works procured niter for gunpowder from limestone caves. When supplies were low, it advertised for housewives to save the contents of their chamber pots, as urine was a rich source of organic nitrogen.

The state's losses at Gettysburg were 1,750 dead plus even more captured or wounded; the famed "Alabama Brigade" took 781 casualties. In 1863 Federal forces secured a foothold in northern Alabama in spite of spirited opposition from Confederate cavalry under General Nathan B. Forrest. A notable Confederate officer from Alabama was Col. William Calvin Oates. He was an instrumental commander during the attack at Little Round Top during the Battle of Gettysburg.

== Mobile Bay ==
From 1861 the Union blockade shut Mobile Bay, and in August 1864 the outer defenses of Mobile were taken by a Federal fleet during the Battle of Mobile Bay. On April 12, 1865, three days after the surrender of Robert E. Lee at Appomattox Courthouse, the city of Mobile surrendered to the Union army to avoid destruction following the Union victories at the Battle of Spanish Fort and the Battle of Fort Blakeley.

The Magee Farm, north of Mobile, was the site of preliminary arrangements for the surrender of the last Confederate States Army east of the Mississippi River. Confederate General Richard Taylor negotiated a ceasefire with Union General Edward Canby at the house on April 29, 1865. Taylor's forces comprised 47,000 Confederate troops serving in Alabama, Mississippi and Louisiana.

== Union occupation of northern Alabama ==
After the Tennessee and Cumberland rivers were taken, Union forces temporarily occupied Northern Alabama until the fall of Nashville (February 1862) allowed permanent occupation of counties north and west of the Tennessee River, while the Union blockade applied pressure in the southern part of the state.

=== Unionists in northern Alabama ===
There was a small loyalist element in northern Alabama that needed Union military support to survive. On the one hand, with Union troops present, Southern Unionists were finally able to come out of hiding, join the Union Army if desired, and care for their families, who were now protected from Confederate partisans. On the other hand, Union troops doubled the amount of regional foraging compared to the Confederates. Federal foragers in Northern Alabama were, for the most part, an adventurous group that were aided by loyal Unionists, and they took all they needed for their vast forces, often raiding farms and homes previously struck by the Confederates.

Before the arrival of Federal troops, local Unionist resistance networks were based on underground cells that aided pro-Union Loyalists by means of finances, contacts, supplies, and much needed local intelligence. Recruits from Alabama who had joined Union regiments used their familiarity with the social network and physical geography of the homefront to locate, rescue, and recruit beleaguered Unionists still behind Confederate lines. Loyalists were given assurance of safety and a job if they were to give the U.S. forces supplies, information, contacts, and money. Some Loyalists were drafted, and some were volunteers. White Unionists used the army as a tool to defeat the forces threatening to destroy the old Union, and their families and neighborhoods along with it. The most well-known unit composed entirely of Alabama Unionists was the 1st Alabama Cavalry Regiment (Union). Of the 2,678 white Alabamians who enlisted in the Union Army, 2,066 served in it.

Union partisans were motivated by a sense of duty and obligation to the Union cause and a need to protect their family and Unionist friends. They were also motivated by a desire for vengeance for all the wrongs they had suffered at Confederate hands throughout the war. Unionist guerrilla bands were typically fairly compact, numbering between twenty and a hundred men. They were independently organized, but were loosely associated and actively supported by occupying Union forces. Their missions included acting as spies, guides, scouts, recruiters behind enemy lines, and anti-guerrilla fighters to protect Union forces and infrastructure.

=== Women ===
Not only did the U.S. Navy's blockade shut down exports, it blocked essential imports, except with blockade runners. Women had charge of making do. They cut back on purchases, brought out old spinning wheels and enlarged their gardens with peas and peanuts to provide clothing and food. They used ersatz substitutes when possible, but there was no real coffee, and it was hard to develop a taste for the okra or chicory substitutes used. The households were severely hurt by inflation in the cost of everyday items and the shortages of food, fodder for the animals, and medical supplies for the wounded. Women had to manage the estates which the men had left behind. Another role the women played was managing the slaves while their husbands were away at war.

Jonathan Wiener studied the census data on plantations in black-belt counties, 1850–70, and found that the War did not drastically alter the responsibilities and roles of women. The age of the groom went up as younger women married older planters, and birth rates dropped sharply during 1863-68 during Reconstruction. However he finds that plantation mistresses were not more likely to operate plantations than in earlier years, nor was there a lost generation of women without men.

The women of the Alabama Unionists helped with long-distance communication networks, and they were able to move freely from town to town because of their gender. When these women lost their Unionist husbands, it was often a struggle to survive, as they were completely ostracized by the pro-Confederate women. Storey finds that their intense loyalty to kin, neighbors, and nation strengthened the Unionists against Confederate ideological pressures so much that they preferred to abandon the slave system and their high socioeconomic status in order to remain true to the Union.

=== Slaves ===
According to historian Margaret M. Storey, "Regardless of the Union's ambivalence toward slaves and slavery, black men and women in Alabama" saw the Union occupation as the surest path to freedom. With regard to Union foraging and the practicing of hard war, while some slaves and free blacks "viewed the loss of goods as negligible in light of the security and opportunities", for others the "Federal occupation brought them loss of even small property [and] meant increased vulnerability to whatever white people won the war."

=== Confederate partisans ===
Many of the Confederate guerrillas in northern Alabama were detached cavalry units that were used to great advantage in protecting the home front, as opposed to serving in the main army. The primary mission of the pro-Confederate guerrillas was to attempt to keep intact the Confederate social and political order. They assisted the war effort in their own backyards by hunting down and arresting Unionists, conscripts, and deserters. In addition, they terrorized Unionists by destroying their property and threatening their families. Confederate guerillas were made up of four types of fighters–the first half of these were under Confederate supervision, being either detached cavalry or enlisted men fighting close to home. The other units either fought disguised as noncombatants or were simply outlaws looking for blood-letting opportunities. These men were not under Confederate control and were as interested in profit as helping the Southern cause.

== Unionists in southern Alabama ==
Not all Union partisans were confined to the Union-occupied areas of Alabama. In the southeast Alabama counties of Dale, Coffee and Henry (which included present-day Houston County and Geneva County, as well), for instance, guerrillas led by local Unionist John Ward operated virtually at will during the last two years of the war, finding refuge in the vast pine forests that covered this region. These renegades sometimes worked with regular U.S. forces based in Pensacola, Florida, and their depredations led several leading citizens of these counties to petition the governor, T.H. Watts, for military assistance against them. Some local citizens, such as Methodist minister Bill Sketoe of Newton, were even hanged by Home Guard elements for alleged acts of collaboration with these guerrillas.

== Battles in Alabama ==
- Battle of Athens
- Battle of Day's Gap
- Battle of Decatur
- Battle of Fort Blakeley
- Battle of Mobile Bay
- Battle of Newton
- Battle of Ebenezer Church
- Battle of Selma
- Battle of Munford
- Battle of Sulphur Creek Trestle
- Battle of Spanish Fort
- Siege of Bridgeport
- Battle of Cherokee Station
- Skirmish at Paint Rock Bridge
- Streight's Raid
- Wilson's Raid

The Battle of Columbus, on the Alabama-Georgia border (part of Wilson's Raid, April 16, 1865), is widely regarded as the last battle of the war, being the final engagement before the dissolution of the Confederacy on May 5.

== Losses ==
Alabama soldiers fought in hundreds of battles; the state's losses at Gettysburg were 1,750 dead plus even more captured or wounded; the famed "Alabama Brigade" took 781 casualties. Governor Lewis E. Parsons in July 1865 made a preliminary estimate of losses. Nearly all the white men had served, some 122,000 he said, of whom 35,000 died in the war and at least another 30,000 were seriously disabled. The next year, Governor Robert M. Patton estimated that 20,000 veterans had returned home permanently disabled, and there were 20,000 widows and 60,000 orphans. With cotton prices low, the value of farms shrank, from $176 million in 1860 to only $64 million in 1870. The livestock supply shrank too, as the number of horses fell from 127,000 to 80,000, and mules from 111,000 to 76,000. The overall population of Alabama remained nearly the same, as the growth that might have been expected was neutralized by death and emigration.

== Congressional delegations ==
Deputies from the first seven states to secede formed the first two sessions of the 1861 Provisional Confederate Congress. Alabama sent William Parish Chilton Sr., Jabez Lamar Monroe Curry, Thomas Fearn (resigned March 16, 1861, after first session; replaced by Nicholas Davis Jr.), Stephen Fowler Hale, David Peter Lewis (resigned March 16, 1861, after first session; replaced by Henry Cox Jones), Colin John McRae, John Gill Shorter (resigned November 1861; replaced by Cornelius Robinson), Robert Hardy Smith, and Richard Wilde Walker.

The bicameral First Confederate Congress (1862–64) included two senators from Alabama—Clement Claiborne Clay and William Lowndes Yancey (died July 23, 1863; replaced by Robert Jemison Jr.). Representing Alabama in the House of Representatives were Thomas Jefferson Foster, William Russell Smith, John Perkins Ralls, Jabez Lamar Monroe Curry, Francis Strother Lyon, William Parish Chilton Sr., David Clopton, James Lawrence Pugh, and Edmund Strother Dargan.

Alabama's two senators in the Second Confederate Congress (1864–65) were Robert Jemison Jr., and Richard Wilde Walker. Representatives were Thomas Jefferson Foster, William Russell Smith, Marcus Henderson Cruikshank, Francis Strother Lyon, William Parish Chilton Sr., David Clopton, James L. Pugh, and James Shelton Dickinson. The CSA Congress refused to seat Representative-elect W.R.W. Cobb because he was an avowed Unionist; therefore his district was not represented.

== War practices ==
War practices were controversial, with land mines at Fort Blakeley exploding on Union troops even after the battle ended. Almost immediately after the Confederacy surrendered, there were allegations that some Confederate soldiers were shot by the Union colored troops, however these allegations were never proven. Available evidence indicates that some Union soldiers may have fired on Confederates who had surrendered but there was no large scale massacre.

== Aftermath ==
Following the end of the Civil War, Alabama was part of the Third Military District.

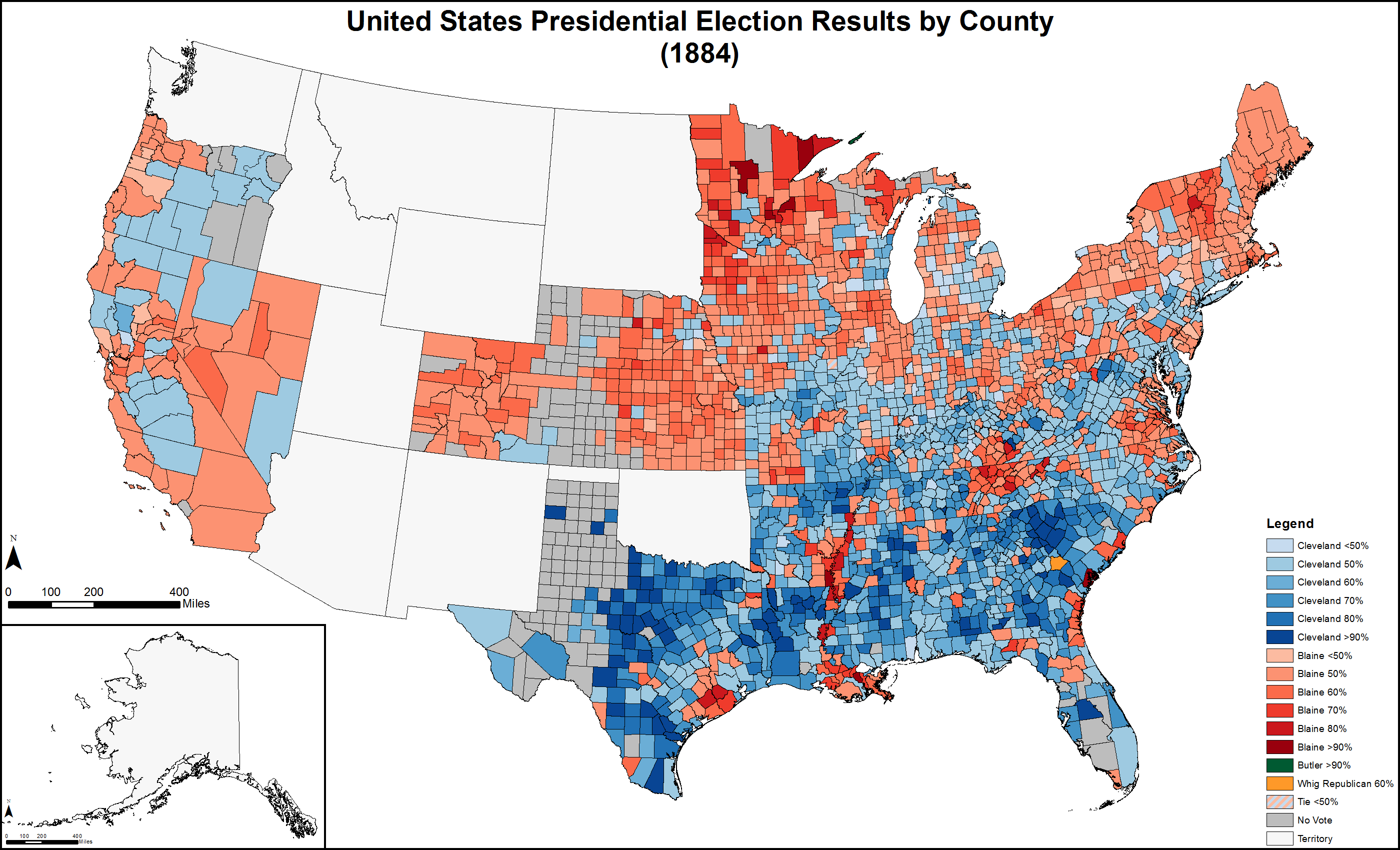
Results by county in the 1884 United States presidential election, explicitly indicating the percentage of the winning candidate in each county. Shades of blue are for Cleveland (Democratic), shades of red are for Blaine (Republican), shades of green are for Butler (Straight Greenback), and shades of yellow are for bolting electors (Whig Republican).

Northern Alabama voters sided with Republican Party for decades after the Civil War, while central and southern Alabama was part of the Solid South for the Democratic Party.

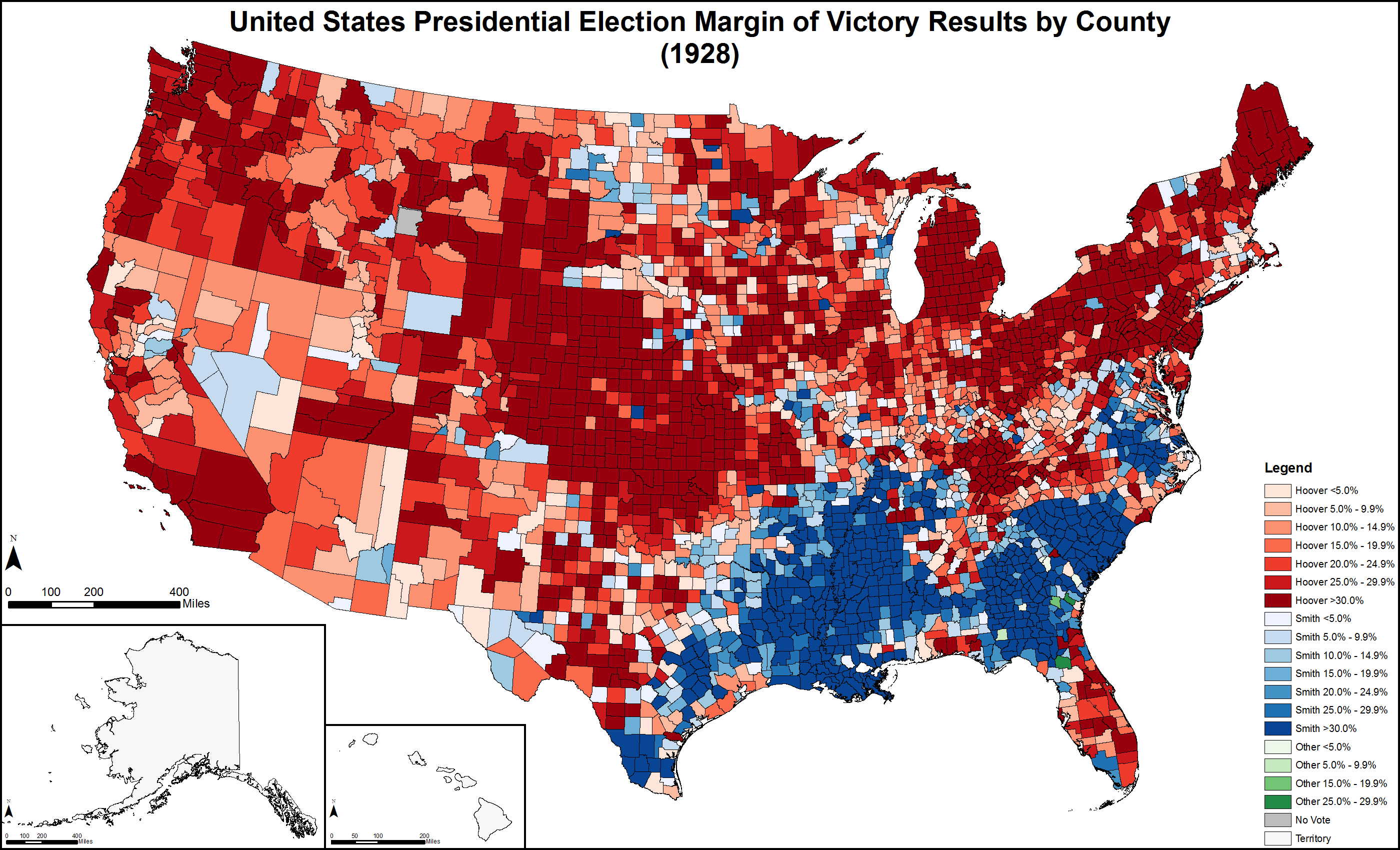
Results by county in the 1928 United States presidential election, explicitly indicating the margin of victory for the winning candidate. Shades of red are for Hoover (Republican) and shades of blue are for Smith (Democratic), and shades of green are for "Other(s)" (Non-Democratic/Non-Republican), gray indicates zero recorded votes, and white indicates territories not elevated to statehood.

== See also ==
- List of Confederate units from Alabama
- Alabama Confederate Soldiers Home
- Confederate States of America, which features an animated map of state secession and confederacy
- List of Alabama Union Civil War regiments
- Mobile, Alabama in the American Civil War
- Selma, Alabama in the American Civil War
- History of slavery in Alabama

First	List of C.S. states by date of admission to the Confederacy; Ratified Constitution on March 13, 1861 (1st)	Succeeded by Georgia
