= Confederate constitution =

The Confederate constitution may refer to:

- Provisional Constitution of the Confederate States
- Constitution of the Confederate States
