= List of Confederate states by date of admission to the Confederacy =

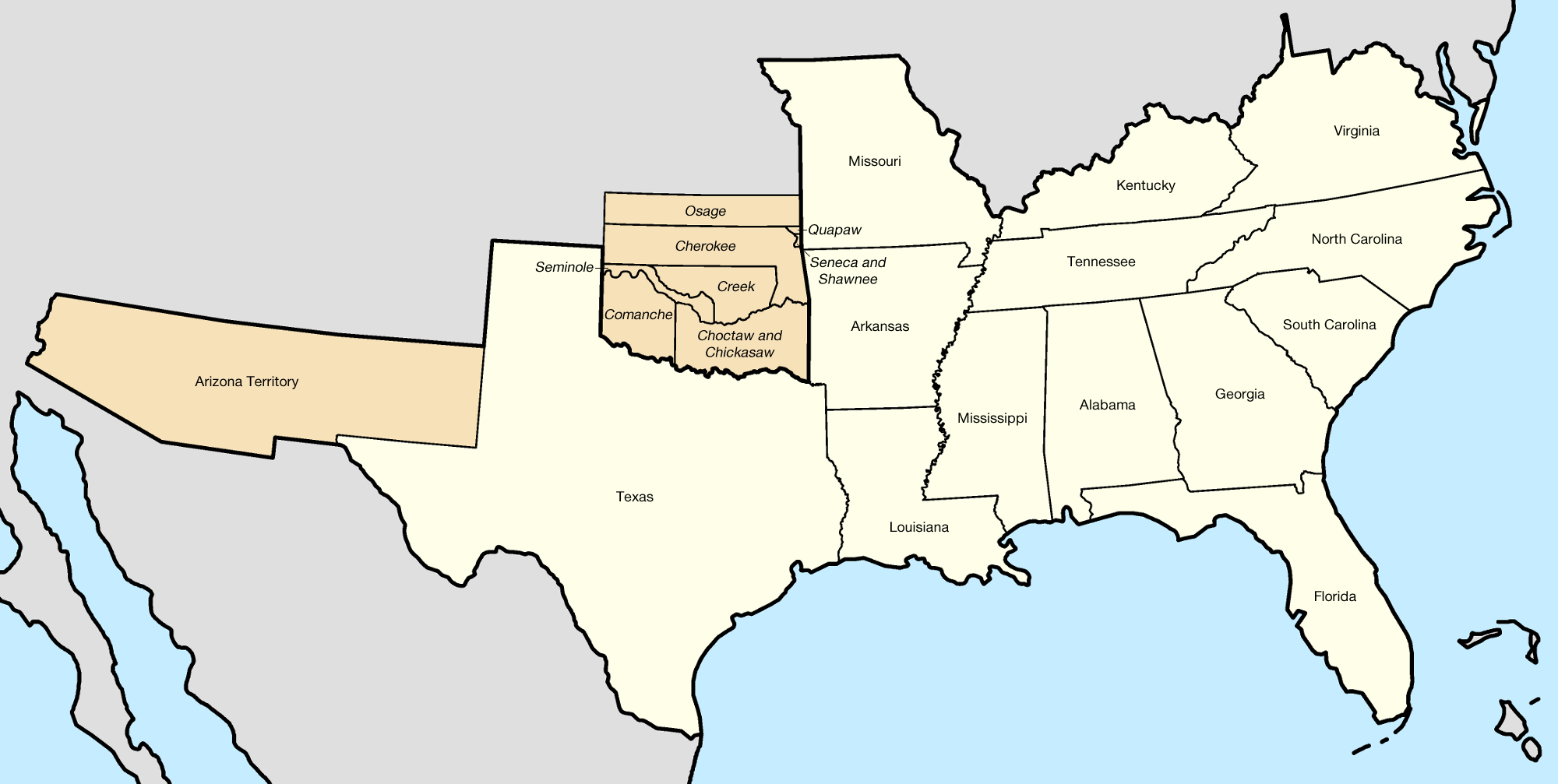
Map of the Confederate States with names and borders of states

A Confederate state was a U.S. state that declared secession and joined the Confederate States of America during the American Civil War. The Confederacy recognized them as constituent entities that shared their sovereignty with the Confederate government. Confederates were recognized as citizens of both the federal republic and of the state in which they resided, due to the shared sovereignty between each state and the Confederate government. Virginia was admitted into the Confederacy as a commonwealth rather than a state. The Confederacy recognized 13 states, but Kentucky and Missouri were southern border states while falling under varying degrees of Confederate control early in the war were represented by governments-in-exile once they were defeated; their pre-war state legislatures never voted to secede, but the Confederacy recognized pro-South provisional governments there as legitimate.

States were the primary subdivisions of the Confederate States and possessed a number of powers and rights under the Constitution of the Confederate States, such as regulating intrastate commerce, running elections, creating local governments, and ratifying constitutional amendments. Each state had its own constitution grounded in republican principles, and government consisting of executive, legislative, and judicial branches.

All states and their citizens were represented in the Confederate States Congress, a bicameral legislature consisting of the Senate and the House of Representatives. Each state was represented by two senators, while Representatives were distributed among the states in proportion to the most recent constitutionally mandated decennial census. Additionally, each state was entitled to select a number of electors to vote in the Electoral College, the body that elected the President of the Confederate States, equal to the total of Representatives and Senators in Congress from that state.

Every new state was admitted pursuant to Article I, Section 6 of the Confederacy's Provisional Constitution which required a simple majority vote in the Provisional Congress. After the establishment of the Confederate States in 1861, the number of states expanded from the original seven to 13. Each new state had been admitted on an equal footing with the existing states. Under Article IV, Section 3, Clause 1 of the permanent Constitution Congress had the authority to admit additional states into the Confederacy, but, unlike the United States and Provisional Confederate Constitutions which required a simple majority vote, admission of new states to the Confederacy required a two-thirds vote in each House with the senators from each state voting jointly.

The following table is a list of all 13 states and their respective dates of statehood. The first seven became states in February and March 1861 upon agreeing to the Provisional Constitution of the Confederate States, and each joined the permanent Confederation of states between March 12 and April 22, 1861, upon ratifying the Constitution of the Confederate States, its permanent constitution (a separate table is included below showing Provisional Constitution of the Confederate States adoption dates). These seven states are presented in the order in which each ratified the permanent Constitution, thus joining the permanent government. The date of admission listed for Virginia, Arkansas, North Carolina, Tennessee, Missouri, and Kentucky was the official date set by an act of the Provisional Congress of the Confederate States.

== List of Confederate states ==
State		Date (admitted or ratified)
1	Alabama	March 13, 1861 (ratified)
2	Georgia	March 16, 1861 (ratified)
3	Louisiana	March 21, 1861 (ratified)
4	Texas	March 23, 1861 (ratified)
5	Mississippi	March 29, 1861 (ratified)
6	South Carolina	April 3, 1861 (ratified)
7	Florida	April 22, 1861 (ratified)
8	Virginia	May 7, 1861 (admitted)
9	Arkansas	May 18, 1861 (admitted)
10	North Carolina	May 20, 1861 (admitted)
11	Tennessee	July 2, 1861 (admitted)
12	Missouri	November 28, 1861 (admitted)
13	Kentucky	December 10, 1861 (admitted)

== Provisional Constitution of the Confederate States adoption dates ==
A provisional congress made up of six Southern states meeting at the Alabama State Capitol in Montgomery, Alabama, approved the Provisional Constitution of the Confederate States on February 8, 1861. The four Southern states that seceded following the Fall of Fort Sumter would adopt the Provisional Constitution of the Confederate States following each state’s secession rather than approving or ratifying it like the original seven southern states. On February 18, 1862, the temporary government under the Provisional Constitution of the Confederate States was replaced with a permanent federal government under the Confederate States Constitution.

State		Date
1	South Carolina	February 8, 1861
2	Georgia	February 8, 1861
3	Florida	February 8, 1861
4	Alabama	February 8, 1861
5	Mississippi	February 8, 1861
6	Louisiana	February 8, 1861
7	Texas	March 2, 1861
