= Constitution of the Confederate States =

Supreme law of the Confederate States of America

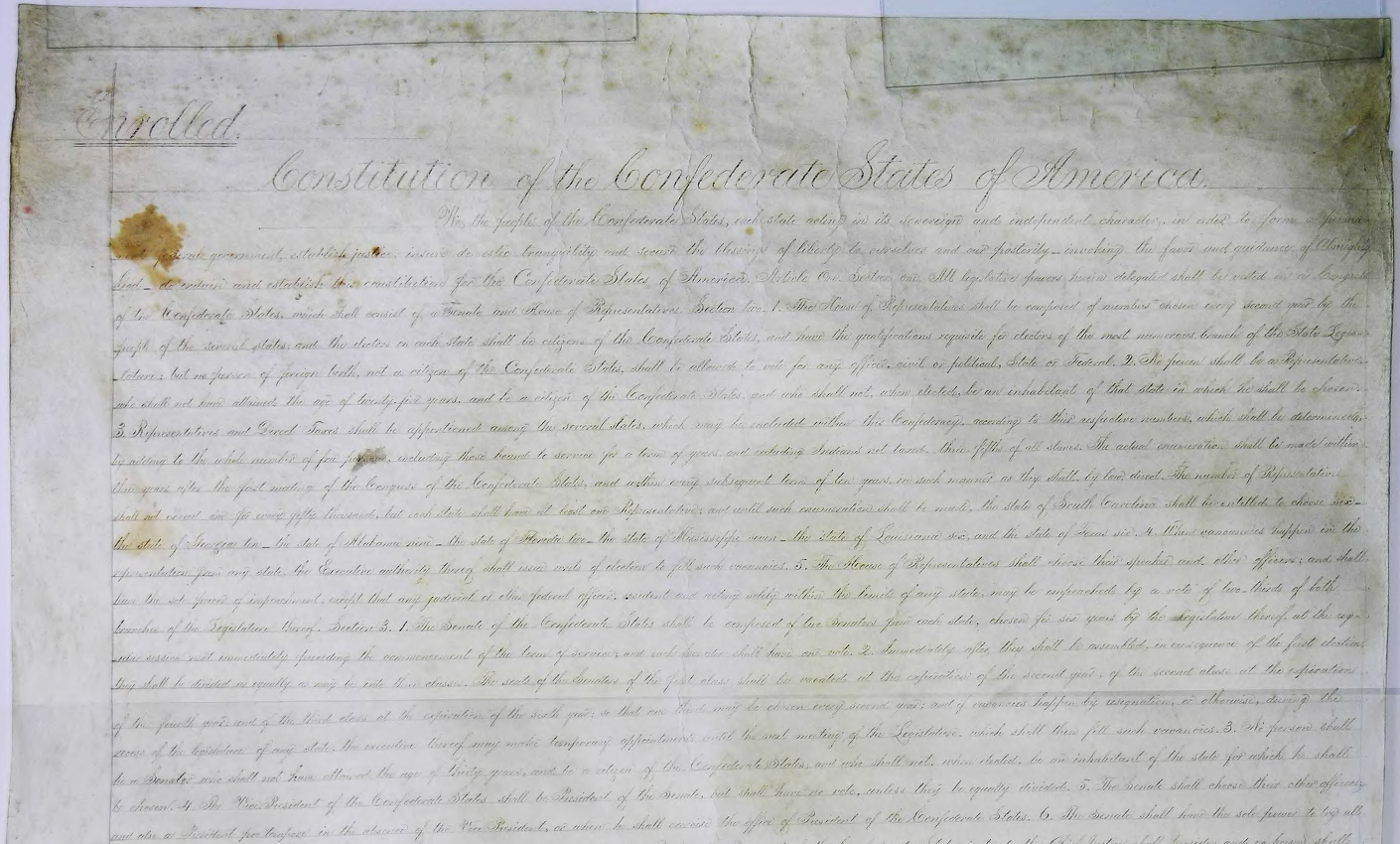
- Page one of the original copy of the Constitution

Overview
- Jurisdiction: Confederate States of America
- Created: March 11, 1861
- Ratified: March 29, 1861
- Date effective: February 22, 1862
- System: Constitutional presidential republic

Government structure
- Branches: 3
- Chambers: Bicameral
- Executive: President
- Judiciary: Supreme, Circuits, Districts
- Federalism: Federation
- Electoral college: Yes
- First legislature: February 18, 1862
- First executive: February 22, 1862
- Location: Hargrett Rare Book and Manuscript Library, University of Georgia
- Commissioned by: Provisional Congress of the Confederate States
- Author: Montgomery Convention
- Signatories: 50 of the 50 deputies to the Provisional Congress of the Confederate States
- Media type: Parchment
- Supersedes: Provisional Constitution of the Confederate States

The Constitution of the Confederate States, sometimes referred to as the Confederate Constitution, was the supreme law of the Confederate States of America. It superseded the Provisional Constitution of the Confederate States, the Confederate States' first constitution, in 1862. It remained in effect until the end of the American Civil War in 1865.

The original Provisional Constitution is located at the American Civil War Museum in Richmond, Virginia, and differs slightly from the version later adopted. The final, handwritten Constitution is located in the Hargrett Rare Book and Manuscript Library at the University of Georgia. Most of its provisions are word-for-word duplicates from the United States Constitution; however, there are crucial differences between the two documents in tone and legal content, primarily regarding slavery.

In particular, as illustrated throughout its Articles I and IV, and elaborated upon in this page's section concerning the ramifications thereof, the Confederate Constitution is unique in constitutional history as the only one to enshrine slavery as an intrinsic fundament of its state's existence — a practice restricted to people of a particular race.

== Comparison with the U.S. Constitution ==
- The preambles of both the U.S. and the Confederate Constitutions have some similarities, but it seems that the Confederate Constitution authors set out to give a different feel to the new preamble. Both preambles are provided here. The bold text shows the differences between them. The Confederate Constitution's preamble includes references to God, a perpetual government, and the sovereignty and the independence of each state.
  - The Preamble to the U.S. Constitution: "We the People of the **United** States, in Order to form a **more perfect Union**, establish Justice, insure domestic Tranquility, **provide for the common defence, promote the general Welfare**, and secure the Blessings of Liberty to ourselves and our Posterity, do ordain and establish this Constitution for the **United** States of America."
  - The Preamble to the Confederate Constitution: "We, the people of the **Confederate** States, **each state acting in its sovereign and independent character,** in order to form a **permanent federal government**, establish justice, insure domestic tranquillity, and secure the blessings of liberty to ourselves and our posterity – **invoking the favor and guidance of Almighty God** – do ordain and establish this Constitution for the **Confederate** States of America."
- All twelve amendments added to the U.S. Constitution prior to 1860, including the Bill of Rights, were directly incorporated into the Confederate Constitution.

=== Article summaries ===
The Confederate Constitution followed the U.S. Constitution for the most part in the main body of the text but with some changes:

==== Article I differences ====
- Amended **Article I Section 2(1)** to prohibit persons "of foreign birth" who were "not a citizen of the Confederate States" from voting "for any officer, civil or political, State or Federal."
- **Article I Section 2(3)** is essentially the same, and the clause still counts only "three-fifths of all slaves" for the population total of each state, just as it did in the U.S. with the Three-Fifths Compromise. "The number of Representatives shall not exceed one for every fifty thousand", whereas in the U.S. Constitution: "The Number of Representatives shall not exceed one for every thirty Thousand." A 1796 proposed Amendment to the U.S. Constitution which is still pending ratification by the states (as of 2026) would change the maximum number of representatives to one for every fifty thousand.
- Amended **Article I Section 2(5)** to allow the state legislatures to impeach federal officials who live and work only within their state with a two-thirds vote of both houses of the state legislature.
- Concerning the appointment of Senators, **Article I Section 3(1)** adds "at the regular session next immediately preceding the commencement of the term of service." The state legislature, which then was responsible for the appointment of senators, had to wait until the seat was vacant.
- **Article I Section 4(1)** deals with elections and adds "subject to the provisions of this Constitution" to the equivalent clause in the U.S. Constitution. That meant that each state legislature was free to make its own decision unless the constitution laid out other rules. The aforementioned **Article I Section 2(1)** and **Article I Section 3(1)** clauses would fall into that category.
- Amended **Article I Section 6(2)** to allow the House of Representatives and the Senate the ability to grant seats to the heads of each executive department to discuss issues involving their departments with Congress. The clause is the same as the one from the U.S. Constitution and adds:

But Congress may, by law, grant to the principal officer in each of the Executive Departments a seat upon the floor of either House, with the privilege of discussing any measures appertaining to his department.

- Amended **Article I Section 7(2)** to provide the President of the Confederate States with a line-item veto but also required any bill in which the president used this veto to be resubmitted to both houses for a possible override vote by two thirds of both houses.
- In an attempt to prevent the Confederate Congress from protecting industry, the framers added to **Article I Section 8(1)**; their text read:

The Congress shall have power – To lay and collect taxes, duties, imposts, and excises for revenue, necessary to pay the debts, provide for the common defense, and carry on the Government of the Confederate States; but no bounties shall be granted from the Treasury; nor shall any duties or taxes on importations from foreign nations be laid to promote or foster any branch of industry; and all duties, imposts, and excises shall be uniform throughout the Confederate States.

The phrase "general Welfare" was dropped from the Confederate clause as well. For comparison, the U.S. constitution reads:

The Congress shall have Power To lay and collect Taxes, Duties, Imposts and Excises, to pay the Debts and provide for the common Defence and general Welfare of the United States; but all Duties, Imposts and Excises shall be uniform throughout the United States;

Article I Section 8(3) added quite a bit to the U.S. Constitution in an attempt to block the Confederate Congress from appropriating money to build "internal improvements" to "facilitate commerce," with some exceptions allowing for safety and improvement to waterways.

Article I Section 8 of the U.S. Constitution.

To regulate Commerce with foreign Nations, and among the several States, and with the Indian Tribes.

Article I Section 8(3) of the Confederate Constitution.

To regulate commerce with foreign nations, and among the several States, and with the Indian tribes; but neither this, nor any other clause contained in the constitution, shall ever be construed to delegate the power to Congress to appropriate money for any internal improvement intended to facilitate commerce; except for the purpose of furnishing lights, beacons, and buoys, and other aids to navigation upon the coasts, and the improvement of harbors and the removing of obstructions in river navigation, in all which cases, such duties shall be laid on the navigation facilitated thereby, as may be necessary to pay the costs and expenses thereof.

- There are changes and additions to **Article 1 Section 9 Clauses (1), (2),** and **(4)** that are covered in the **Slavery** section below.
- The first eight amendments to the U.S. Constitution became clauses **(12)** to **(19)** in **Article I Section 9**.
- In addition to this, there were three altogether-new clauses in the Confederate Constitution for Article I, Section 9.
- **Article I, Section 9(9)**

Congress shall appropriate no money from the treasury except by a vote of two-thirds of both Houses, taken by yeas and nays, unless it be asked and estimated for by some one of the heads of Department, and submitted to Congress by the President; or for the purpose of paying its own expenses and contingencies; or for the payment of claims against the Confederate States, the justice of which shall have been judicially declared by a tribunal for the investigation of claims against the government, which it is hereby made the duty of Congress to establish.

- **Article I, Section 9(10)**

All bills appropriating money shall specify in federal currency the exact amount of each appropriation and the purposes for which it is made; and Congress shall grant no extra compensation to any public contractor, officer, agent or servant, after such contract shall have been made or such service rendered.

- **Amendments I** through **VIII** are contained, in the same order, in **Article I, Section 9(12)** through **Article I, Section 9(19)** (the remainder of the U.S. Bill of Rights is in Article VI).
- **Article I, Section 9(20)** was added to limit new bills to only one subject presented.

Every law or resolution having the force of law, shall relate to but one subject, and that shall be expressed in the title.

Then in Section 10:

- Article I Section 10(3): Individual states were unable to tax ships and negotiate treaties concerning waterways with other states without congressional consent. The clause limited the states' ability to keep troops or to engage in war, but provided some ability to enter compacts for the improvement of shared rivers.

No State shall, without the consent of Congress, lay any duty on tonnage, except on sea-going vessels, for the improvement of its rivers and harbors navigated by the said vessels; but such duties shall not conflict with any treaties of the Confederate States with foreign nations; and any surplus revenue, thus derived, shall, after making such improvement, be paid into the common treasury. Nor shall any state keep troops or ships of war in time of peace, enter into any agreement or compact with another state, or with a foreign power, or engage in war, unless actually invaded, or in such imminent danger as will not admit of delay. But when any river divides or flows through two or more States, they may enter into compacts with each other to improve the navigation thereof.

=== Article II ===
- The President of the Confederate States of America is to be elected by electors, chosen by the individual states, for a single six-year term, rather than a then-unlimited number of four-year terms. **Article 2 Section 1(1)** reads as: "The executive power shall be vested in a President of the Confederate States of America. He and the Vice President shall hold their offices for the term of six years; but the President shall not be re-eligible."
- **Amendment XII** of the U.S. Constitution is added here as **Article II Section 1(3), (4),** and **(5)**
- **Article II Section 1(7)** of the Confederate Constitution required candidates for the President of the Confederacy to have resided "within the limits of the Confederate States" for 14 years.

Changes to Article III

- **Article III Section 2(1)** of the Confederate Constitution combines the first clause of **Article III Section 1** in the U.S. Constitution with **Amendment XI**. The phrase "citizens of the same state" is left out and "and foreign states, citizens or subjects; but no state shall be sued by a citizen or subject of any foreign state" is added in the Confederate Constitution.

Changes to Article IV

- There were changes and additions to **Article IV Section 2(1)** and **Article IV Section 3(3)**, which are covered in the **Slavery** section below.
- **Article IV Section 3(1)** required a two-thirds of both houses of Congress vote for a new state to join the Confederacy.

Other states may be admitted into this Confederacy by a vote of two-thirds of the whole House of Representatives, and two-thirds of the Senate, the Senate voting by states; but no new state shall be formed or erected within the jurisdiction of any other state; nor any state be formed by the junction of two or more states, or parts of states, without the consent of the legislatures of the states concerned as well as of the Congress.

Changes to Article V

- The Confederate Congress, unlike in the U.S. Constitution, could not propose amendments. Instead, amendments had to be proposed by constitutional conventions in at least three states. The Confederate Constitution also clarified an ambiguity in the U.S. Constitution's Article V by declaring that a national convention could propose only amendments that were suggested by state conventions, as opposed to having the authority to amend the entire Constitution. The process of amendment became easier (**Article V Section 1(1)**) by requiring only two thirds of the states to ratify, rather than three fourths.

Changes to Article VI

- The Confederate Constitution added a clause to aid with the transition from the provisional government.

Article VI Section 1(1) The Government established by this Constitution is the successor of the Provisional Government of the Confederate States of America, and all the laws passed by the latter shall continue in force until the same shall be repealed or modified; and all the officers appointed by the same shall remain in office until their successors are appointed and qualified, or the offices abolished.

- **Amendments IX** and **X** of the U.S. Constitution were added here as **Article VI Section 1(5),** and **(6)**

Changes to Article VII

- **Article VII Section 1(2)**, with instructions for electing permanent officials after the ratification of the Confederate Constitution, was added.

When five states shall have ratified this Constitution, in the manner before specified, the Congress under the Provisional Constitution, shall prescribe the time for holding the election of President and Vice President; and, for the meeting of the Electoral College; and, for counting the votes, and inaugurating the President. They shall, also, prescribe the time for holding the first election of members of Congress under this Constitution, and the time for assembling the same. Until the assembling of such Congress, the Congress under the Provisional Constitution shall continue to exercise the legislative powers granted them; not extending beyond the time limited by the Constitution of the Provisional Government.

=== Differences by subject ===
==== Slavery ====
There were several major differences between the constitutions concerning slavery.

- Whereas the original U.S. Constitution did not use the word "slavery" or the term "Negro Slaves" but instead used "Person[s] held to Service or Labour," which included whites and Native Americans in indentured servitude, the Confederate Constitution addresses the legality of slavery directly and by name.
- Though Article I, Section 9(1), of both constitutions are quite similar in banning the importation of slaves from foreign nations, the Confederate Constitution permitted the Confederate States to import slaves from the United States and specified the "African race" as the subject. The importation of slaves into the United States, including the South, had been illegal since 1808.

Article I Section 9(1) The importation of Negroes of the African race from any foreign country, other than the slave-holding States or Territories of the United States of America, is hereby forbidden; and Congress is required to pass such laws as shall effectually prevent the same.

While the U.S. Constitution reads

The Migration or Importation of such Persons as any of the States now existing shall think proper to admit, shall not be prohibited by the Congress prior to the Year one thousand eight hundred and eight, but a tax or duty may be imposed on such Importation, not exceeding ten dollars for each Person.

- The Confederate Constitution then added a clause that gave Congress the power to prohibit the importation of slaves from any non-Confederate state.

Article I Section 9(2) Congress shall also have power to prohibit the introduction of slaves from any State not a member of, or Territory not belonging to, this Confederacy.

While the U.S. Constitution has a clause that states "No bill of attainder or ex post facto law shall be passed," the Confederate Constitution also added a phrase that explicitly protected slavery.

Article I Section 9(4) No bill of attainder, ex post facto law, or law denying or impairing the right of property in negro slaves shall be passed.

- The U.S. Constitution states in Article IV, Section 2, "The Citizens of each State shall be entitled to all Privileges and Immunities of Citizens in the several States." The Confederate Constitution added that a state government could not prohibit the rights of slave owners traveling or visiting from a different state with their slaves.

Article IV Section 2(1) The citizens of each State shall be entitled to all the privileges and immunities of citizens in the several States; and shall have the right of transit and sojourn in any State of this Confederacy, with their slaves and other property; and the right of property in said slaves shall not be thereby impaired.

- The Confederate Constitution added a clause about the question of slavery in the territories, the key constitutional debate of the 1860 election, by explicitly stating slavery to be legally protected in the territories.

Article IV Section 3(3) The Confederate States may acquire new territory; and Congress shall have power to legislate and provide governments for the inhabitants of all territory belonging to the Confederate States, lying without the limits of the several states; and may permit them, at such times, and in such manner as it may by law provide, to form states to be admitted into the Confederacy. In all such territory, the institution of negro slavery as it now exists in the Confederate States, shall be recognized and protected by Congress, and by the territorial government: and the inhabitants of the several Confederate States and Territories, shall have the right to take to such territory any slaves lawfully held by them in any of the states or territories of the Confederate states.

==== States' rights ====
The Confederate Constitution's preamble included the phrase "each State acting in its sovereign and independent character," which focused the new constitution on the rights of the individual states.

- The Preamble to the Confederate Constitution, began, "We, the people of the Confederate States, each State acting in its sovereign and independent character...."

States of the Confederacy gained several rights that states of the Union do not have, such as the right to impeach federal judges and other federal officers if they worked or lived solely in their state.

Article I Section 2(5) The House of Representatives shall choose their speaker and other officers; and shall have the sole power of impeachment; except that any judicial or other federal officer, resident and acting solely within the limits of any state, may be impeached by a vote of two-thirds of both branches of the Legislature thereof.

- The Confederate Constitution omitted the phrase "emit Bills of Credit" from Article 1 Section 10 of the U.S. Constitution, which denied the states the right to issue such bills of credit.

Article I Section 10(1) No State shall enter into any treaty, alliance, or confederation; grant letters of marque and reprisal; coin money; make anything but gold and silver coin a tender in payment of debts; pass any bill of attainder, or ex post facto law, or law impairing the obligation of contracts; or grant any title of nobility.

U.S. Constitution's Article I Section 10 including the included "emit Bills of Credit."

No State shall enter into any Treaty, Alliance, or Confederation; grant Letters of Marque and Reprisal; coin Money; emit Bills of Credit; make any Thing but gold and silver Coin a Tender in Payment of Debts; pass any Bill of Attainder, ex post facto Law, or Law impairing the Obligation of Contracts, or grant any Title of Nobility.

- The Confederate Constitution enabled states to tax ships by omitting the phrase from the U.S. Constitution that prohibits it.

Article I Section 9(7) No preference shall be given by any regulation of commerce or revenue to the ports of one State over those of another.

The U.S. Constitution reads:

No Preference shall be given by any Regulation of Commerce or Revenue to the Ports of one State over those of another: nor shall Vessels bound to, or from, one State, be obliged to enter, clear, or pay Duties in another.

The ability to tax ships to raise revenue for the Confederate States is reinforced in Article 1 Section 10(3).

Article I Section 10(3) No State shall, without the consent of Congress, lay any duty on tonnage, except on seagoing vessels, for the improvement of its rivers and harbors navigated by the said vessels; but such duties shall not conflict with any treaties of the Confederate States with foreign nations; and any surplus revenue thus derived shall, after making such improvement, be paid into the common treasury.

The Confederate States lost a few rights that the Union states retained.

- States lost the right to determine if foreigners can vote in their states: **Article I Section 2(1)** as mentioned above.
- States also lost the ability to restrict the rights of traveling and sojourning slave owners: **Article IV Section 2(1)** as mentioned above. (Many Southerners were already of the opinion that the U.S. Constitution already protected the rights of sojourning and traveling slave owners and that the Confederate Constitution merely made it explicit.)
- The Confederate Congress could determine taxes between states.

Article I Section 9(6) No tax or duty shall be laid on articles exported from any State, except by a vote of two-thirds of both Houses.

- The Confederate Constitution contained many of the phrases and clauses that had led to disagreement among U.S. states, including a Supremacy Clause, a Commerce Clause, and a Necessary and Proper Clause. The Supremacy Clause and the Necessary and Proper Clause are nearly identical in both constitutions.
  - The Commerce Clause differed slightly from the U.S. version in that the Confederate Congress was prevented from appropriating money for "internal improvements" to "facilitate commerce,".

== Judicial review ==
Although the Confederate States Supreme Court was never constituted, the supreme courts of the various Confederate states issued numerous decisions interpreting the Confederate Constitution. Unsurprisingly, since the Confederate Constitution was based on the United States Constitution, the Confederate State Supreme Courts often used U.S. Supreme Court precedents. The jurisprudence of the Marshall Court thus influenced the interpretation of the Confederate Constitution. The state courts repeatedly upheld robust powers of the Confederate Congress, especially on matters of military necessity.

== Analysis ==
Contemporary historians overwhelmingly agree that secession was motivated by the preservation of slavery. There were numerous causes for secession, but the preservation and the expansion of slavery were easily the most important of them. The confusion may come from blending the causes of secession with the causes of the war, which are separate but related issues. (Lincoln entered a military conflict not to free the slaves but to put down a rebellion.) According to historian Kenneth M. Stampp, each side supported states' rights or federal power only when it was convenient to do so. Stampp also cited Confederate Vice President Alexander H. Stephens's A Constitutional View of the Late War Between the States as an example of a Southern leader who said that slavery was the "cornerstone of the Confederacy" when the war began but, after the Southern defeat, said that the war had been instead about states' rights.

According to an 1861 speech delivered by Alabama politician Robert Hardy Smith, the State of Alabama declared its secession from the United States to preserve and to perpetuate the practice of slavery, the debate over which he referred to as the "Negro quarrel." In his speech, Smith praised the Confederate constitution for its lack of euphemisms and its succinct protections of the right to own "Negro" slaves:

We have dissolved the late Union chiefly because of the negro quarrel. Now, is there any man who wished to reproduce that strife among ourselves? And yet does not he, who wished the slave trade left for the action of Congress, see that he proposed to open a Pandora's box among us and to cause our political arena again to resound with this discussion. Had we left the question unsettled, we should, in my opinion, have sown broadcast the seeds of discord and death in our Constitution. I congratulate the country that the strife has been put to rest forever, and that American slavery is to stand before the world as it is, and on its own merits. We have now placed our domestic institution, and secured its rights unmistakably, in the Constitution. We have sought by no euphony to hide its name. We have called our negroes 'slaves', and we have recognized and protected them as persons and our rights to them as property.

— Robert Hardy Smith, An Address to the Citizens of Alabama on the Constitution and Laws of the Confederate States of America, 1861.

Georgia Democrat Alexander H. Stephens, who would become the Confederate vice president, stated within his Cornerstone Speech that the Confederate constitution was "decidedly better than" the American one, as the former "put at rest, forever, all the agitating questions relating to our peculiar institution. African slavery as it exists amongst us; the proper status of the negro in our form of civilization. This was the immediate cause of the late rupture and present revolution. Jefferson in his forecast, had anticipated this, as the 'rock upon which the old Union would split.' He was right."

== Signers ==
The signers and the states they represented were:

- Howell Cobb, President of the Congress
- South Carolina: R. Barnwell Rhett, C. G. Memminger, Wm. Porcher Miles, James Chesnut, Jr., R. W. Barnwell, William W. Boyce, Laurence Keitt, T. J. Withers
- Georgia: R. Toombs, Francis S. Bartow, Martin J. Crawford, Alexander H. Stephens, Benjamin H. Hill, Thos. R. R. Cobb, E. A. Nisbet, Augustus R. Wright, A. H. Kenan
- Florida: Jackson Morton, J. Patton Anderson, Jas. B. Owens
- Alabama: Richard W. Walker, Robt. H. Smith, Colin J. McRae, William P. Chilton, Stephen F. Hale, David P. Lewis, Tho. Fearn, Jno. Gill Shorter, J. L. M. Curry
- Mississippi: Alex. M. Clayton, James T. Harrison, William S. Barry, W. S. Wilson, Walker Brooke, W. P. Harris, J. A. P. Campbell
- Louisiana: John Perkins Jr., Alex. de Clouet, C. M. Conrad, Duncan F. Kenner, Henry Marshall, Edward Sparrow
- Texas: John Hemphill, Thomas N. Waul, John H. Reagan, Williamson S. Oldham, Louis T. Wigfall, John Gregg, William Beck Ochiltree

== Ratification ==
Congress began to move for ratification of the Confederate States Constitution on March 11, 1861:

State		Date
1	Alabama	March 13, 1861
2	Georgia	March 16, 1861
3	Louisiana	March 21, 1861
4	Texas	March 23, 1861
5	Mississippi	March 29, 1861
6	South Carolina	April 3, 1861
7	Florida	April 22, 1861

== See also ==
- List of national constitutions
- Slavery and the United States Constitution
