= South Carolina in the American Civil War =

Coordinates: 34°N 81°W

South Carolina
- Nickname(s): "Palmetto Republic"
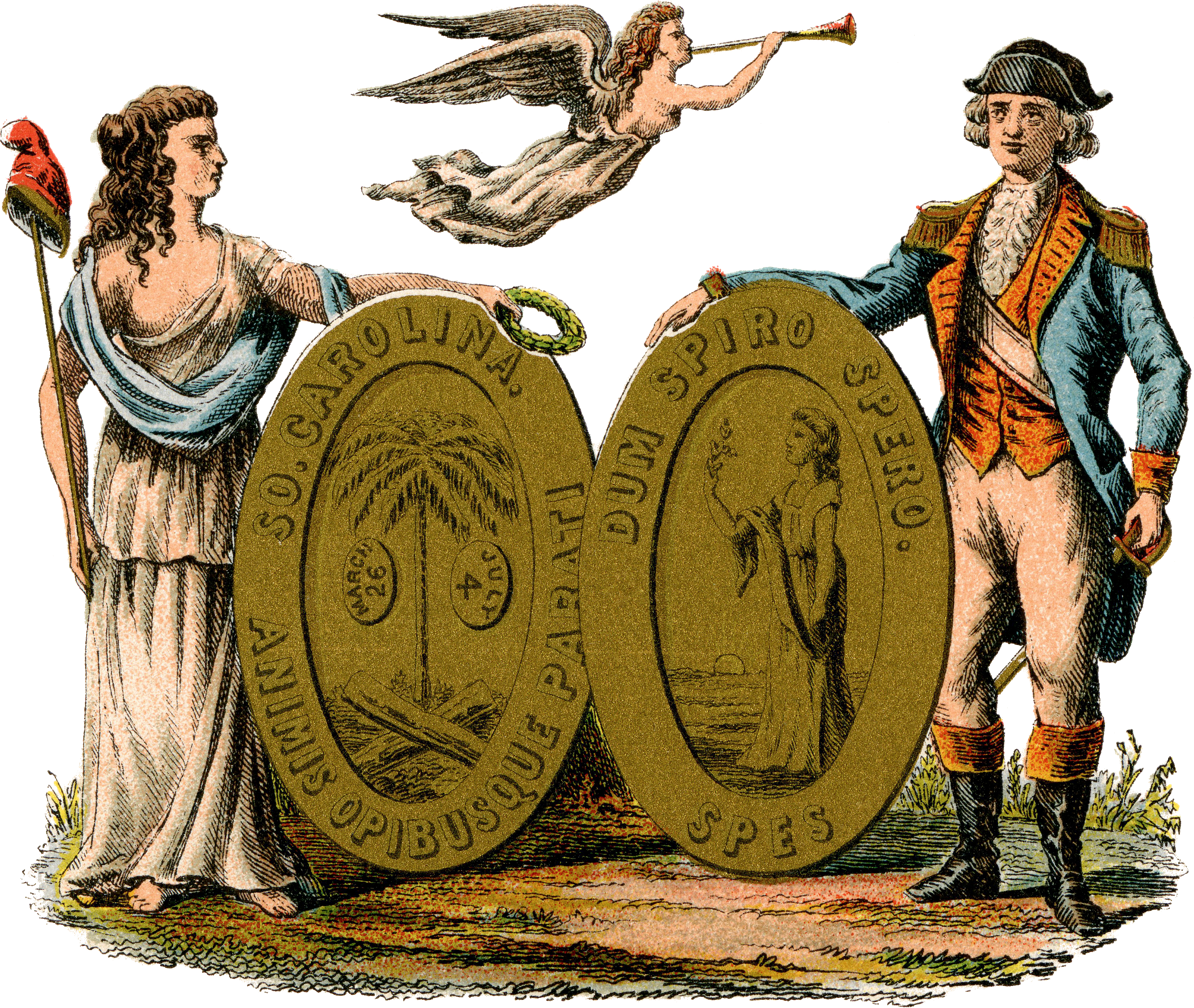
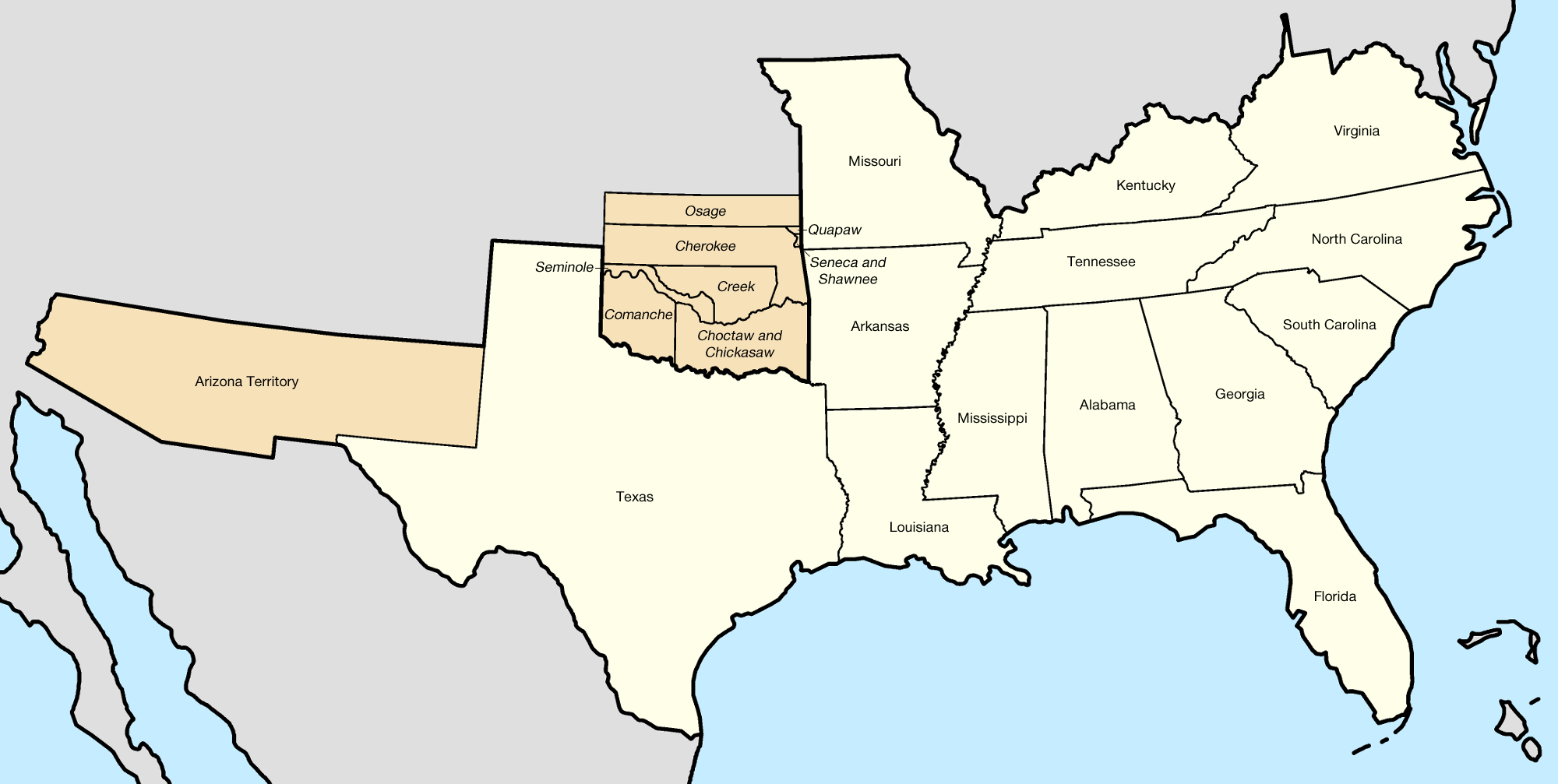
- Flag Coat of arms Map of the Confederate States
- Capital: Columbia
- Largest city: Charleston
- Admitted to the Confederacy: April 3, 1861 (6th)
- Population: 703,708 total; • 301,302 (42.82%) free; • 402,406 (57.18%) slave
- Forces supplied: Confederate troops: 60,000 total
- Major garrisons/armories: Fort Sumter, Charleston Harbor
- Governor: 1860–1862 Francis Pickens; 1862–1864 Milledge Bonham; 1864–1865 Andrew Magrath
- Senators: Robert Woodward Barnwell; James Lawrence Orr
- Representatives: List
- Restored to the Union: July 9, 1868

South Carolina was the first state to secede from the Union on December 20, 1860, and existing briefly as an independent state before becoming one of the founding member states of the Confederacy in February 1861. The bombardment of the beleaguered U.S. garrison at Fort Sumter in Charleston Harbor on April 12, 1861, is generally recognized as the first military engagement of the war. The retaking of Charleston in February 1865, and raising the flag (the same flag) again at Fort Sumter, was used for the Union symbol of victory.

South Carolina provided around 60,000 troops for the Confederate Army. As the war progressed, former slaves and free blacks of South Carolina joined U.S. Colored Troops regiments for the Union Army (most Blacks in South Carolina were enslaved at the war's outset). The state also provided uniforms, textiles, food, and war material, as well as trained soldiers and leaders from The Citadel and other military schools. In contrast to most other Confederate states, South Carolina had a well-developed rail network linking all of its major cities without a break of gauge.

Relatively free from Union occupation until the very end of the war, South Carolina hosted a number of prisoner of war camps. South Carolina also was the only Confederate state not to harbor pockets of anti-secessionist sentiment strong enough to send regiments of white men to fight for the Union, as every other state in the Confederacy did. However, the Upstate region of the state would serve as a haven for Confederate Army deserters and resisters, as they used the Upstate topography and traditional community relations to resist service in the Confederate ranks.

Among the leading Confederate Army generals from South Carolina were Wade Hampton III, a foremost cavalry commander; Maxcy Gregg, killed in action at Fredericksburg; Joseph B. Kershaw, whose South Carolina infantry brigade saw some of the hardest fighting of the Army of Northern Virginia; James Longstreet, the senior lieutenant general; and Stephen D. Lee, the youngest lieutenant general.

== Background ==
The white population of the state had strongly supported the institution of slavery since the 18th century. Political leaders such as Democrats John Calhoun and Preston Brooks had inflamed regional and national passions in support of the institution, and many pro-slavery voices had cried for secession.

For decades, South Carolinian political leaders had promoted regional passions with threats of nullification and secession in the name of southern states' rights and protection of the interests of the slave power.

Alfred P. Aldrich, a South Carolinian politician from Barnwell, stated that declaring secession would be necessary if a Republican candidate were to win the 1860 U.S. presidential election, stating that it was the only way for the state to preserve slavery and diminish the influence of the anti-slavery Republican Party, which, were its goals of abolition realized, would result in the "destruction of the South":

If the Republican party with its platform of principles, the main feature of which is the abolition of slavery and, therefore, the destruction of the South, carries the country at the next Presidential election, shall we remain in the Union, or form a separate Confederacy? This is the great, grave issue. It is not who shall be President, it is not which party shall rule – it is a question of political and social existence.

— Alfred P. Aldrich

In a January 1860 speech, South Carolinian congressman Laurence Massillon Keitt, summed up this view in an oratory condemning the "anti-slavery party" (i.e. the Republican Party) for its views against slavery. He claimed that slavery was not morally wrong, but rather, justified:

The anti-slavery party contends that slavery is wrong in itself, and the Government is a consolidated national democracy. We of the South contend that slavery is right...

— Laurence Massillon Keitt, Speech to the House (January 1860).

Later that year, in December, Keitt would state that South Carolina's declaring of secession was the direct result of slavery:

Our people have come to this on the question of slavery.

— Laurence Massillon Keitt, South Carolina secession debates (December 1860).

== Secession ==
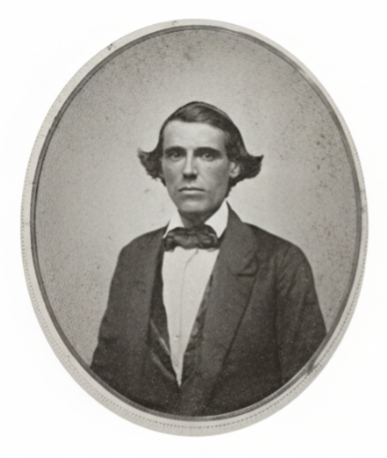
State politicians, like Richard Morrison II, voted on secession

On November 9, 1860, the South Carolina General Assembly passed a "Resolution to Call the Election of Abraham Lincoln as U.S. President a Hostile Act" and stated its intention to declare secession from the United States.

In December 1860, amid the secession crisis, former South Carolinian congressman John McQueen wrote to a group of civic leaders in Richmond, Virginia, regarding the reasons as to why South Carolina was contemplating secession from the United States. In the letter, McQueen claimed that U.S. president-elect Abraham Lincoln supported equality and civil rights for African Americans as well as the abolition of slavery, and thus South Carolina, being opposed to such measures, was compelled to secede:

I have never doubted what Virginia would do when the alternatives present themselves to her intelligent and gallant people, to choose between an association with her sisters and the dominion of a people, who have chosen their leader [Abraham Lincoln] upon the single idea that the African is equal to the Anglo-Saxon, and with the purpose of placing our slaves on equality with ourselves and our friends of every condition! and if we of South Carolina have aided in your deliverance from tyranny and degradation, as you suppose, it will only the more assure us that we have performed our duty to ourselves and our sisters in taking the first decided step to preserve an inheritance left us by an ancestry whose spirit would forbid its being tarnished by assassins. We, of South Carolina, hope soon to greet you in a Southern Confederacy, where white men shall rule our destinies, and from which we may transmit to our posterity the rights, privileges and honor left us by our ancestors.

— John McQueen, Correspondence to T.T. Cropper and J.R. Crenshaw (December 24, 1860)

South Carolinian Presbyterian minister James Henley Thornwell also espoused a similar view to McQueen's, stating that slavery was justified under the Christian religion, and thus, those who viewed slavery as being immoral were opposed to Christianity:

The parties in the conflict are not merely abolitionists and slaveholders. They are atheists, socialists, communists, red republicans, Jacobins on the one side, and friends of order and regulated freedom on the other. In one word, the world is the battleground – Christianity and Atheism the combatants; and the progress of humanity at stake.

— James Henley Thornwell

And again, the Southern Presbyterian of S.C. declared that:

Anti-slavery is essentially infidel. It wars upon the Bible, on the Church of Christ, on the truth of God, on the souls of men.

— Southern Presbyterian of S.C.

On November 10, 1860, the S.C. General Assembly called for a "Convention of the People of South Carolina" to consider secession. Delegates were to be elected on December 6. The secession convention convened in Columbia on December 17 and voted unanimously, 169–0, to declare secession from the United States. The convention then adjourned to Charleston to draft an ordinance of secession. When the ordinance was adopted on December 20, 1860, South Carolina became the first slave state in the south to declare that it had seceded from the United States. James Buchanan, the United States president, declared the ordinance illegal but did not act to stop it.

A committee of the convention also drafted a Declaration of the Immediate Causes Which Induce and Justify the Secession of South Carolina which was adopted on December 24. The secession declaration stated the primary reasoning behind South Carolina's declaring of secession from the U.S., which was described as:

...increasing hostility on the part of the non-slaveholding States to the Institution of Slavery ...

— Declaration of the Immediate Causes Which Induce and Justify the Secession of South Carolina (December 24, 1860).

The declaration also claims that secession was declared as a result of the refusal of free states to enforce the Fugitive Slave Acts. Although the declaration does argue that secession is justified on the grounds of U.S. "encroachments upon the reserved rights of the States," the grievances that the declaration goes on to list are mainly concerned with the property of rights of slave holders. Broadly speaking, the declaration argues that the U.S. Constitution was framed to establish each State "as an equal" in the Union, with "separate control over its own institutions", such as "the right of property in slaves."

We affirm that these ends for which this Government was instituted have been defeated, and the Government itself has been made destructive of them by the action of the non-slaveholding States. Those States have assumed the right of deciding upon the propriety of our domestic institutions; and have denied the rights of property established in fifteen of the States and recognized by the Constitution; they have denounced as sinful the institution of Slavery; they have permitted the open establishment among them of societies, whose avowed object is to disturb the peace and to eloign the property of the citizens of other States. They have encouraged and assisted thousands of our slaves to leave their homes; and those who remain, have been incited by emissaries, books and pictures to servile insurrection.

— Declaration of the Immediate Causes Which Induce and Justify the Secession of South Carolina

A repeated concern is runaway slaves. The declaration argues that parts of the U.S. Constitution were specifically written to ensure the return of slaves who had escaped to other states, and quotes the 4th Article: "No person held to service or labor in one State, under the laws thereof, escaping into another, shall, in consequence of any law or regulation therein, be discharged from such service or labor, but shall be delivered up, on claim of the party to whom such service or labor may be due." The declaration goes on to state that this stipulation of the Constitution was so important to the original signers, "that without it that compact [the Constitution] would not have been made." Laws from the "General Government" upheld this stipulation "for many years," the declaration says, but "an increasing hostility on the part of the non-slaveholding States to the Institution of Slavery has led to a disregard of their obligations." Because the constitutional agreement had been "deliberately broken and disregarded by the non-slaveholding States," the consequence was that "South Carolina is released from her obligation" to be part of the Union.

A further concern was Lincoln's recent election to the presidency, whom they claimed desired to see slavery on "the course of ultimate extinction":

A geographical line has been drawn across the Union, and all the States north of that line have united in the election of a man to the high office of President of the United States whose opinions and purposes are hostile to slavery. He is to be entrusted with the administration of the Common Government, because he has declared that that "Government cannot endure permanently half slave, half free," and that the public mind must rest in the belief that Slavery is in the course of ultimate extinction.

The South Carolinian secession declaration of December 1860 also channeled some elements from the U.S. Declaration of Independence from July 1776. However, the South Carolinian version omitted the phrases that "all men are created equal", "that they are endowed by their Creator with certain unalienable Rights", and mentions of the "consent of the governed". Professor and historian Harry V. Jaffa noted these omissions as significant in his 2000 book, A New Birth of Freedom: Abraham Lincoln and the Coming of the Civil War:

South Carolina cites, loosely, but with substantial accuracy, some of the language of the original Declaration. That Declaration does say that it is the right of the people to abolish any form of government that becomes destructive of the ends for which it was established. But South Carolina does not repeat the preceding language in the earlier document: "We hold these truths to be self-evident, that all men are created equal"...

— Harry Jaffa, A New Birth of Freedom: Abraham Lincoln and the Coming of the Civil War (2000)

Jaffa states that South Carolina omitted references to human equality and consent of the governed in its secession declaration, as due to their racist and pro-slavery views, secessionist South Carolinians did not believe in those ideals:

[G]overnments are legitimate only insofar as their "just powers" are derived "from the consent of the governed." All of the foregoing is omitted from South Carolina's declaration, for obvious reasons. In no sense could it have been said that the slaves in South Carolina were governed by powers derived from their consent. Nor could it be said that South Carolina was separating itself from the government of the Union because that government had become destructive of the ends for which it was established. South Carolina in 1860 had an entirely different idea of what the ends of government ought to be from that of 1776 or 1787. That difference can be summed up in the difference between holding slavery to be an evil, if possibly a necessary evil, and holding it to be a positive good.

— Harry Jaffa, A New Birth of Freedom: Abraham Lincoln and the Coming of the Civil War (2000), emphasis added.

On December 25, the day following South Carolina's declaration of secession, a South Carolinian convention delivered an "Address to the Slaveholding States":

We prefer, however, our system of industry, by which labor and capital are identified in interest, and capital, therefore, protects labor–by which our population doubles every twenty years–by which starvation is unknown, and abundance crowns the land–by which order is preserved by unpaid police, and the most fertile regions of the world, where the white man cannot labor, are brought into usefulness by the labor of the African, and the whole world is blessed by our own productions. ... We ask you to join us, in forming a Confederacy of Slaveholding States.

— Convention of South Carolina, Address of the people of South Carolina to the people of the Slaveholding States (December 25, 1860)

"Slavery, not states' rights, birthed the Civil War," argues sociologist James W. Loewen. Writing of South Carolina's Declaration of Secession, Loewen writes that

South Carolina was further upset that New York no longer allowed "slavery transit." In the past, if Charleston gentry wanted to spend August in the Hamptons, they could bring their cook along. No longer — and South Carolina's delegates were outraged. In addition, they objected that New England states let black men vote and tolerated abolitionist societies. According to South Carolina, states should not have the right to let their citizens assemble and speak freely when what they said threatened slavery. Other seceding states echoed South Carolina. "Our position is thoroughly identified with the institution of slavery — the greatest material interest of the world," proclaimed Mississippi in its own secession declaration, passed Jan. 9, 1861. "Its labor supplies the product which constitutes by far the largest and most important portions of the commerce of the earth. ... A blow at slavery is a blow at commerce and civilization."

— James W. Loewen, The Washington Post (2011)

The state adopted the palmetto flag as its banner, a slightly modified version of which is used as its current state flag. South Carolina after secession was frequently called the "Palmetto Republic".

After South Carolina declared its secession, former congressman James L. Petigru famously remarked, "South Carolina is too small for a republic and too large for an insane asylum." Soon afterwards, South Carolina began preparing for a presumed U.S. military response while working to convince other southern states to secede as well and join in a confederacy of southern states.

On February 4, 1861, in Montgomery, Alabama, a convention consisting of delegates from South Carolina, Florida, Alabama, Mississippi, Georgia, and Louisiana met to form a new constitution and government modeled on that of the United States. On February 8, 1861, South Carolina officially joined the Confederacy. According to one South Carolinian newspaper editor:

The South is now in the formation of a Slave Republic...

— L.W. Spratt, The Philosophy of Secession: A Southern View (February 13, 1861).

South Carolina's declaring of secession was supported by the state's religious figures, who claimed that it was consistent with the tenets of their religion:

The triumphs of Christianity rest this very hour upon slavery; and slavery depends on the triumphs of the South... This war is the servant of slavery.

— John T. Wightman, The Glory of God, the Defence of the South (1861).

== American Civil War ==
1862 United States Coast Survey map of the Coast of South Carolina from Charleston to Hilton Head

=== Fort Sumter ===
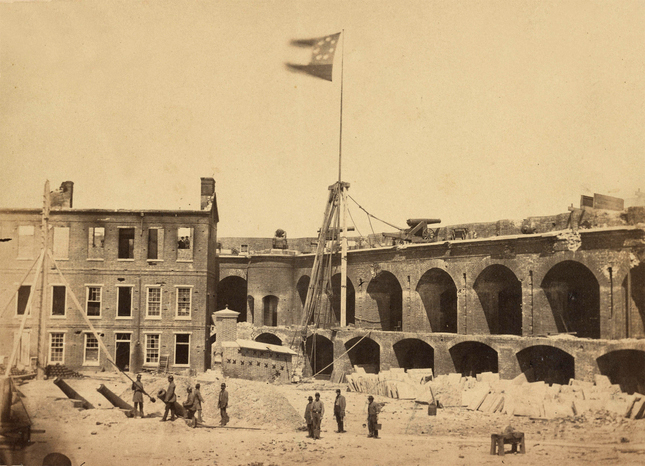
Fort Sumter, 1861, flying the Confederate flag after the fort's capture from the U.S. by the Confederacy.

Six days after secession, on the day after Christmas, Major Robert Anderson, commander of the U.S. troops in Charleston, withdrew his troops to the island fortress of Fort Sumter in Charleston Harbor. South Carolina militia swarmed over the abandoned mainland batteries and trained their guns on the island. Sumter was the key position for preventing a naval attack upon Charleston, so secessionists were determined not to allow U.S. forces to remain there indefinitely. More importantly, South Carolina's claim of independence would look empty if U.S. forces controlled its largest harbor. On January 9, 1861, the U.S. ship Star of the West approached to resupply the fort. Cadets from The Citadel, The Military College of South Carolina fired upon the Star of the West, striking the ship three times and causing it to retreat back to New York.

Mississippi declared its secession several weeks after South Carolina, and five other states of the lower South soon followed. Both the outgoing Buchanan administration and President-elect Lincoln had denied that any state had a right to secede. Upper Southern slave states such as Virginia and North Carolina, which had initially voted against secession, called a peace conference, to little effect. Meanwhile, Virginian orator Roger Pryor barreled into Charleston and proclaimed that the only way to get his state to join the Confederacy was for South Carolina to instigate war with the United States. The obvious place to start was right in the midst of Charleston Harbor.

On April 10, the Mercury reprinted stories from New York papers that told of a naval expedition that had been sent southward toward Charleston. Lincoln advised the governor of South Carolina that the ships were sent to resupply the fort, not to reinforce it. The Carolinians could no longer wait if they hoped to take the fort before the U.S. Navy arrived. About 6,000 men were stationed around the rim of the harbor, ready to take on the 60 men in Fort Sumter. At 4:30 a.m. on April 12, after two days of intense negotiations, and with Union ships approaching the harbor, the firing began. Students from The Citadel were among those firing the first shots of the war, though Edmund Ruffin is usually credited with firing the first shot. Thirty-four hours later, Anderson's men raised the white flag and were allowed to leave the fort with colors flying and drums beating, saluting the U.S. flag with a 50-gun salute before taking it down. During this salute, one of the guns exploded, killing a young soldier—the only casualty of the bombardment and the first casualty of the war.

In December 1861, South Carolina received $100,000 from Georgia after a disastrous fire in Charleston.

=== Robert Smalls ===
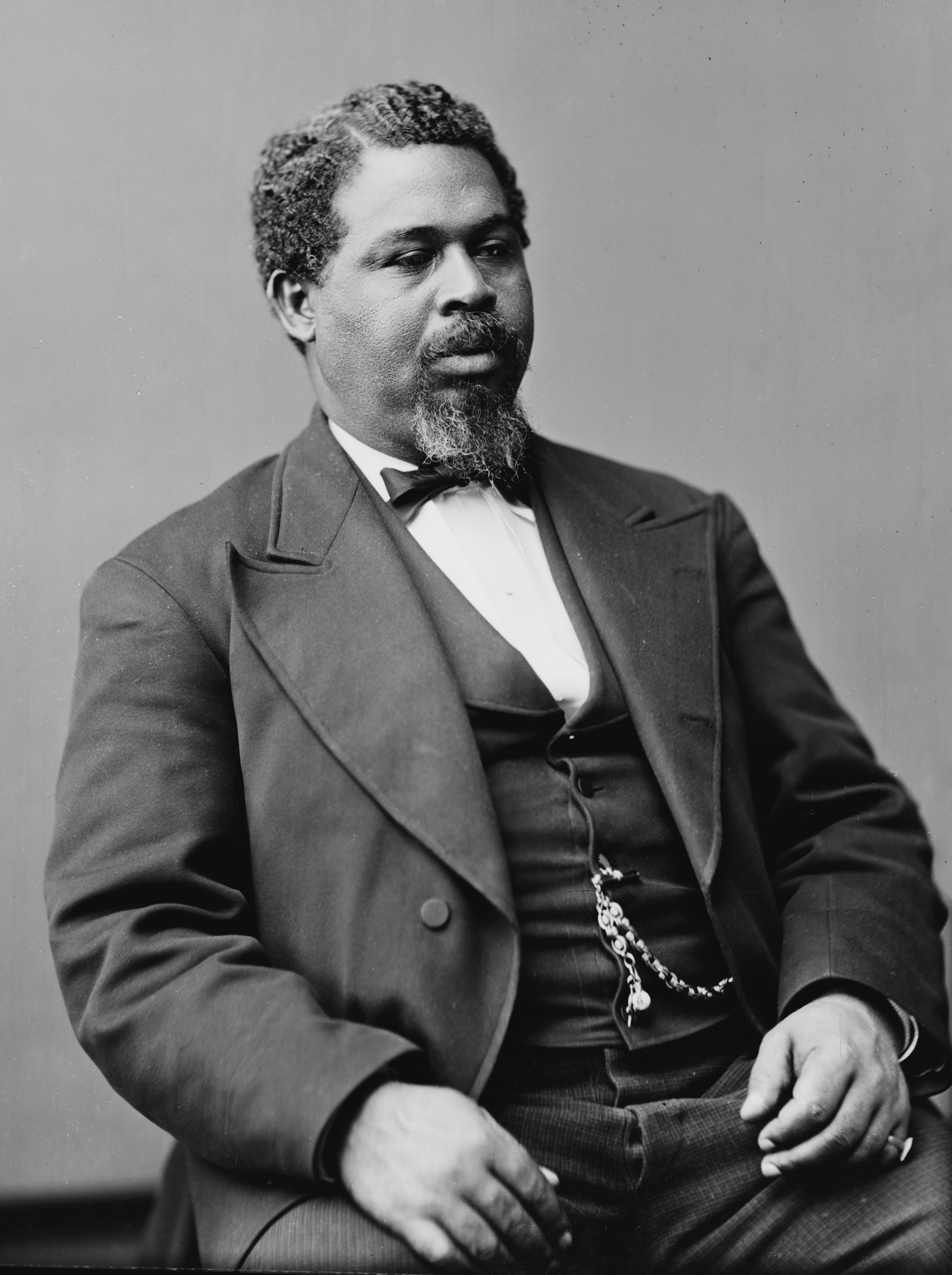
Congressman Robert Smalls

Robert Smalls (1839 – 1915) was born into slavery in Beaufort, South Carolina. On May 13, 1863, he freed himself, his crew, and their families by commandeering a Confederate transport ship, CSS Planter, in Charleston harbor, and sailing it from Confederate-controlled waters of the harbor to the U.S. blockade that surrounded it. He then piloted the ship to the Union-controlled enclave in Beaufort–Port Royal–Hilton Head area, where it became a Union warship. His example and persuasion helped convince President Abraham Lincoln to accept African-American soldiers into the Union Army. After the war Smalls helped found the Republican Party in South Carolina and was elected five times to the U.S. Congress.

=== Fort Wagner ===
Fort Wagner was the scene of two battles. The First Battle of Fort Wagner, occurred on July 11, 1863. Only 12 Confederate soldiers were killed, as opposed to the Union's 339 losses.

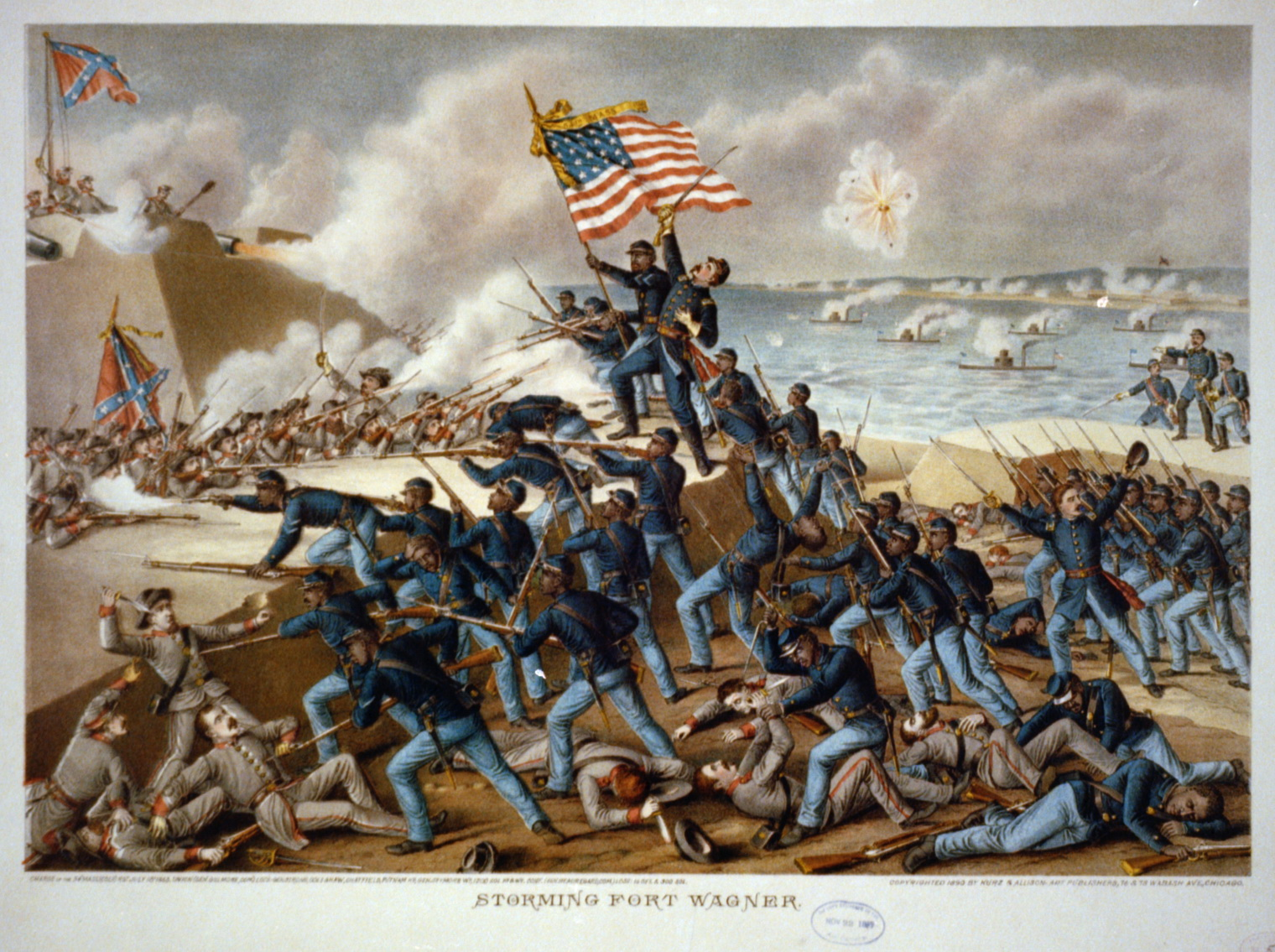
54th Massachusetts Regiment charging towards Fort Wagner

The Second Battle of Fort Wagner, a week later, is better known. This was the Union attack on July 18, 1863, led by the 54th Massachusetts Volunteer Infantry, one of the first major American military units made up of black soldiers. Colonel Robert Gould Shaw led the 54th Massachusetts on foot while they charged, and was killed in the assault.

Although a tactical defeat, the publicity of the battle of Fort Wagner led to further action for black troops in the Civil War, and it spurred additional recruitment that gave the Union Army a further numerical advantage in troops over the South.

The Union besieged the fort after the unsuccessful assault. By August 25, Union entrenchments were close enough to attempt an assault on the Advanced Rifle Pits, 240 yards in front of the Battery, but this attempt was defeated. A second attempt, by the 24th Mass. Inf., on August 26 was successful. After enduring almost 60 days of heavy shelling, the Confederates abandoned it on the night of September 6–7, 1863. withdrawing all operable cannons and the garrison.

=== Port Royal experiment ===
The Port Royal Experiment was a program in which former slaves successfully worked on the land abandoned by planters. In 1861 the Union captured the Sea Islands off the coast of South Carolina and their main harbor, Port Royal. The white residents fled, leaving behind 10,000 black slaves. Several private Northern charity organizations stepped in to set up schools and help the former slaves become self-sufficient. The result was a model of what Reconstruction could have been. The African Americans demonstrated their ability to work the land efficiently and live independently of white control. They assigned themselves daily tasks for cotton growing and spent their extra time cultivating their own crops, fishing and hunting. By selling their surplus crops, the locals acquired small amounts of property.

=== Charleston ===
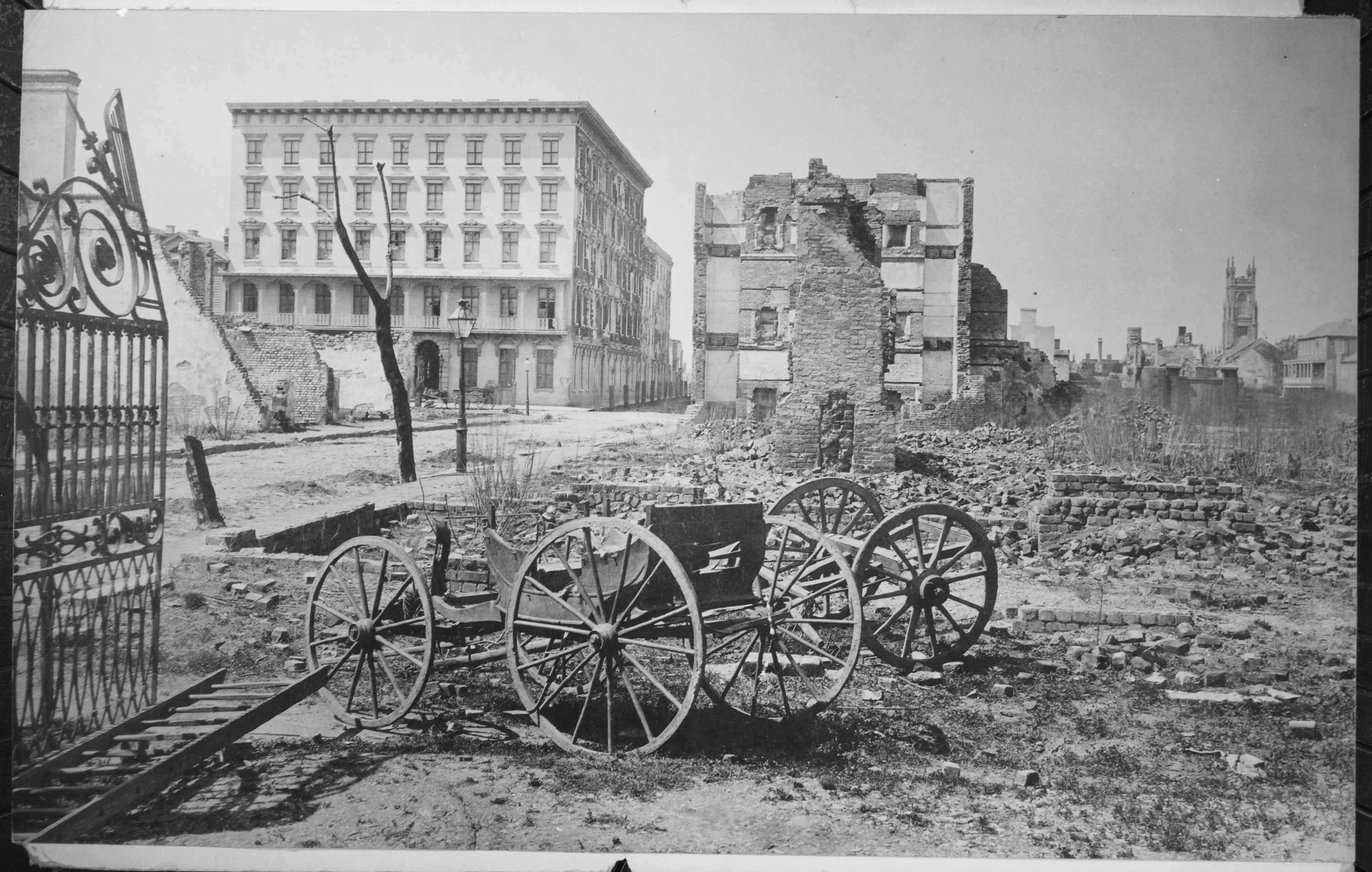
The Mills House Hotel and nearby ruined buildings in Charleston, with a shell-damaged carriage and the remains of a brick chimney in the foreground (1865)

The city under siege took control of Fort Sumter, became the center for blockade running. It was the site of the first successful submarine warfare on February 17, 1864, when the H.L. Hunley made a daring night attack on the USS Housatonic.

In 1865, Union troops moved into the city, and took control of many sites, such as the United States Arsenal, which the Confederate army had seized at the outbreak of the war.

=== The war ends ===
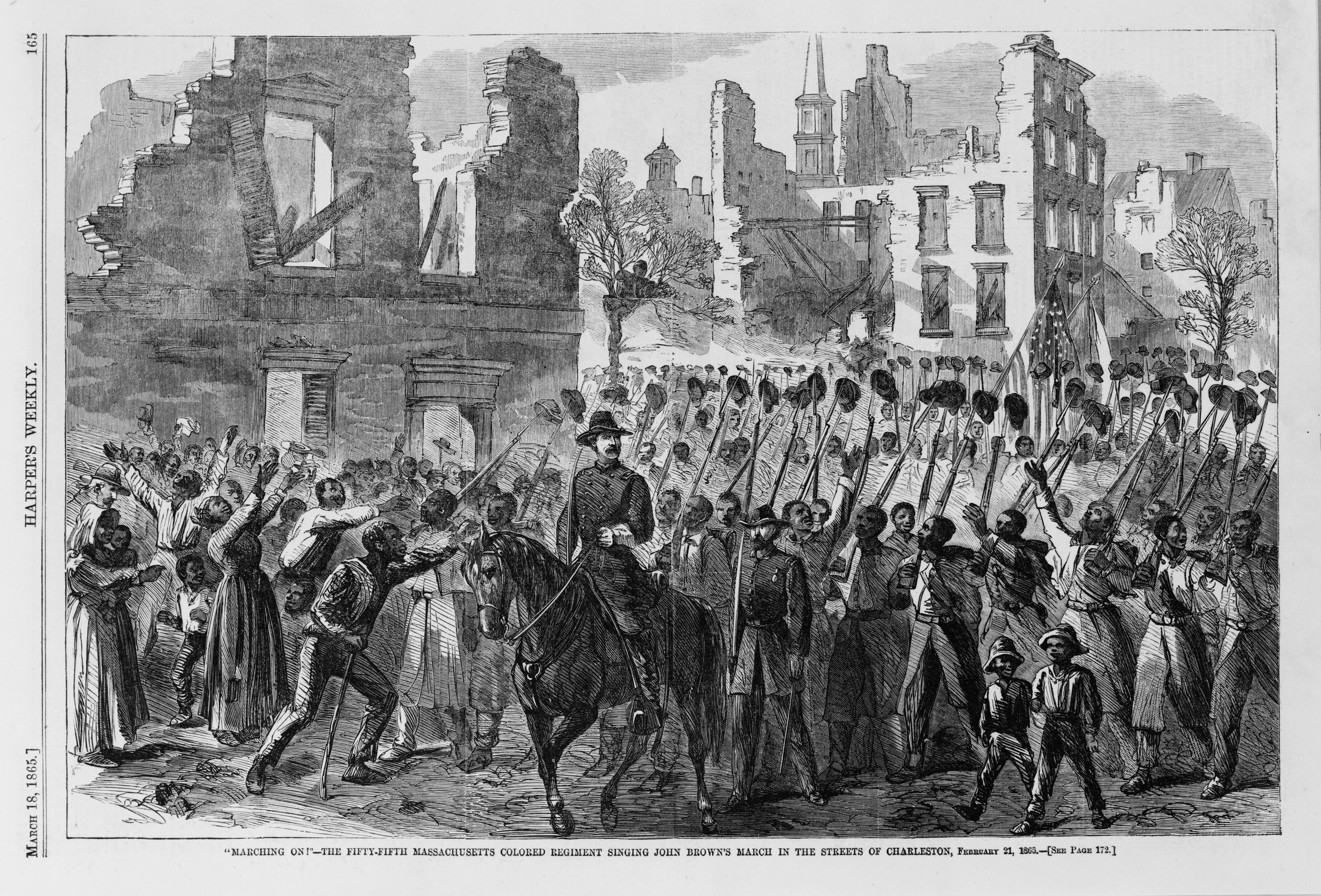
The local Black population was delighted to see United States Colored Troops marching into Charleston, South Carolina, in February 1865, singing "John Brown's Body".

The Confederates were at a disadvantage in men, weaponry, and supplies. Union ships sailed south and blocked off one port after another. As early as November, Union troops occupied the Sea Islands in the Beaufort area, establishing an important base for the men and ships who would obstruct the ports at Charleston and Savannah. Many plantation owners had already gone off with the Confederate Army; those still at home and their families fled. In a type of reparation long discussed in abolitionist literature, the abandoned plantations were confiscated by the Union Army and then given to the African Americans who had done the work of them. The Sea Islands became the laboratory for Union plans to educate the African Americans for their eventual role as full American citizens.

Despite South Carolina's important role in the beginning of the war, and a long unsuccessful attempt to take Charleston from 1863 onward, few military engagements occurred within the state's borders until 1865, when Sherman's Army, having already completed its March to the Sea in Savannah, marched to Columbia and leveled most of the town, as well as a number of towns along the way and afterward. South Carolina lost 12,922 men to the war, 23% of its male white population of fighting age, and the highest percentage of any state in the nation. Sherman's 1865 march through the Carolinas resulted in the burning of Columbia and numerous other towns. The destruction his troops wrought upon South Carolina was even worse than in Georgia, because many of his soldiers bore a particular grudge against the state and its citizens, whom they blamed for starting the war. One of Sherman's men declared, "Here is where treason began and, by God, here is where it shall end!" Deprived of the free labor of the formerly enslaved, poverty would mark the state for generations to come.

In January 1865, the Charleston Courier newspaper condemned suggestions that the Confederacy abandon slavery were it to help in gaining independence, stating that such suggestions were "folly":

To talk of maintaining our independence while we abolish slavery is simply to talk folly.

— Courier (January 24, 1865)

On February 21, 1865, with the Confederate forces finally evacuated from Charleston, the black 54th Massachusetts Regiment marched through the city. At a ceremony at which the U.S. flag was once again raised over Fort Sumter, former fort commander Robert Anderson was joined on the platform by two men: African American Union hero Robert Smalls and the son of Denmark Vesey.

== Battles in South Carolina ==
Map of Charleston and its defenses, 1863

- Battle of Fort Sumter
- Battle of Port Royal
- Battle of Secessionville
- Battle of Simmon's Bluff
- First Battle of Charleston Harbor
- Second Battle of Charleston Harbor
- Second Battle of Fort Sumter
- First Battle of Fort Wagner
- Battle of Grimball's Landing
- Second Battle of Fort Wagner (Morris Island)
- Battle of Honey Hill
- Battle of Tulifinny
- Battle of Rivers' Bridge
- Battle of Anderson County
- Battle of Brattonsville
- Battle of Broxton's Bridge
- Battle of Cheraw
- Battle of Gamble's Hotel (The Columns)
- Battle of Aiken

== Restoration to Union ==
Following the end of the Civil War, South Carolina was part of the Second Military District.

After meeting the requirements of Reconstruction, including ratifying amendments to the US Constitution to abolish slavery and grant citizenship to former slaves, South Carolina's representatives were readmitted to Congress. The state was fully restored to the United States on July 9, 1868.

As part of the Compromise of 1877, in which Southern Democrats would acknowledge Republican Rutherford B. Hayes as president, Republicans would meet certain demands. One affecting South Carolina was the removal of all U.S. military forces from the former Confederate states. At the time, U.S. troops remained in only Louisiana, South Carolina, and Florida, but the Compromise completed their withdrawal from the region.

== Legacy ==
"I believe," said I, "there is but one State as proud as Virginia, and that is the fiery little State of South Carolina." "I have less respect for South Carolina," said he, "than for any other State in the Union. South Carolina troops were the worst troops in the Confederate army. It was South Carolina's self-conceit and bluster that caused the war." (So, State pride in another State than Virginia was only self-conceit.) "Yes," said I, "South Carolina began the war; but Virginia carried it on. If Virginia had thrown the weight of her very great power in the Union against secession, resort to arms would never have been necessary. She held a position which she has forfeited forever, because she was not true to it. By seceding she lost wealth, influence, slavery, and the blood of her bravest sons; and what has she gained?"

— J.T. Trowbridge, The South: A Tour of Its Battlefields and Ruined Cities (1866)

== See also ==
- List of South Carolina Confederate Civil War units
- List of South Carolina Union Civil War units

Preceded by Mississippi	List of C.S. states by date of admission to the Confederacy; Ratified Constitution on April 3, 1861 (6th)	Succeeded by Florida
