= James Byeram Owens =

American politician

Deputy from Florida to the Provisional Congress of the Confederate States
- In office February 4, 1861 – February 17, 1862
- Preceded by: New constituency
- Succeeded by: Constituency abolished

Personal details
- Born: c. 1816 Fairfield County, South Carolina, U.S.
- Died: August 1, 1889 Marion County, Florida, U.S.
- Resting place: Evergreen Cemetery, Ocala, Florida, U.S.
- Spouse: Louisa Owens
- Children: Willie Owens

James Byeram Owens (c. 1816 – August 1, 1889) was a slaveowner and American politician who served as a Deputy from Florida to the Provisional Congress of the Confederate States from 1861 to 1862. He mounted legal arguments in defense of secession based on an originalist interpretation of the U.S. Constitution and Southern arguments in favor of states' rights, with the intention of protecting the practice and institution of slavery.

== Biography ==
Owens was born in Fairfield County, South Carolina, moving to Mississippi and later to Marion County, Florida, in 1857, with two of his brothers. Owens was one of the wealthier slaveowning planters in Marion County. His name appears on the 1860 Slave Census Schedules for Marion County which attribute to him the ownership of 89 enslaved persons. Owens used the forced labor of enslaved Black people to work the land on his plantation, where cotton was grown.

Owens served as a delegate from Florida at the Democratic National Conventions of 1860. At the first convention, held in Charleston, he was selected to represent the interests of Southern Democrats in a debate with Benjamin Butler of Massachusetts. Owens, along with the Florida delegation and several other entire delegations representing the Southern states, walked out of the Charleston convention and held their own convention, where they nominated John C. Breckinridge for the Democratic Party ticket in the U.S. presidential election of 1860.

Owens then represented Marion County at the Secession Convention of Florida held in Tallahassee in January 1861 and was a signatory to the Ordinance of Secession which declared Florida's secession from the United States. Shortly thereafter, Florida joined the Confederacy and Owens became a Deputy in the Provisional Congress of the Confederate States as well as a signatory to the Constitution of the Confederate States, representing Florida.

After the war, Owens, along with all other former Confederates, was granted a full and unconditional pardon by President Andrew Johnson in 1868.

== Notable relatives ==
Owens was the brother-in-law of Ethelbert Barksdale and the maternal grandfather of John W. Martin, the 24th Governor of Florida, by way of his daughter, Willie Owens, and her husband, John M. Martin Jr., himself the son of John Marshall Martin.

== See also ==
- List of people pardoned or granted clemency by the president of the United States

Political offices
New constituency	Deputy from Florida to the Provisional Congress of the Confederate States; 1861–1862	Constituency abolished
