= Thomas Jefferson Withers =

American politician (1804–1865)

Thomas Jefferson Withers (1804 – November 7, 1865) was an American politician from South Carolina who served in the Confederate States Congress during the American Civil War.

== Biography ==
Withers was born in York County, South Carolina. In his youth he was a protege of U.S. Senator William Smith and studied at South Carolina College. He was elected as a state court judge in 1846, to fill the vacancy left by the election of Andrew Butler to the US Senate. He represented the state in the Provisional Confederate Congress in 1861 and signed the Confederate States Constitution although it was reported that when taking the oath to the new constitution, he refused to kiss the Bible.

Withers is also notable for the sexually explicit letters he wrote in 1826 to a college friend, future South Carolina governor James Henry Hammond, with whom Withers had a homosexual relationship. The letters, which are housed among the Hammond Papers at the South Carolina Library, were first published by researcher Martin Duberman in 1981, and are notable for being rare evidence of same-sex relationships in the antebellum United States.

Withers married a Miss Boykin (sister-in-law of Stephen Decatur Miller, governor of South Carolina), with whom he had several children. Withers died at Camden in Kershaw County, South Carolina, and was interred at the Quaker Cemetery in the same city.
