= Robert Hardy Smith =

American politician

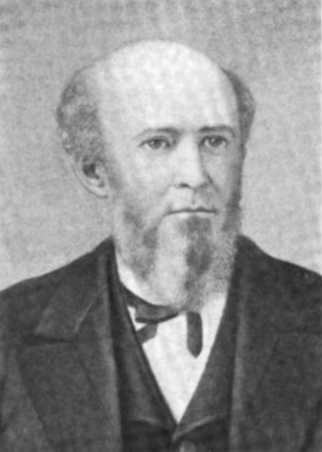

Member of the Provisional Confederate Congress
- In office 1861–1862

Member of the Alabama Senate
- In office 1851

Member of the Alabama House of Representatives
- In office 1849

Personal details
- Born: March 21, 1813; Camden County, North Carolina
- Died: March 13, 1878 (aged 64); Mobile, Alabama
- Resting place: Magnolia Cemetery
- Occupation: Politician, military officer

Robert Hardy Smith (March 21, 1813 – March 13, 1878) was an American politician who served as a senior officer of the Confederate States Army during the American Civil War. He served in the Alabama House of Representatives and the Alabama Senate. He served in the Confederate Congress, was a Confederate officer, and advocated for slavery.

== Early life and career ==
Smith was born in Camden County, North Carolina on March 21, 1813, and later moved to Alabama. In Alabama, Smith served in the state's House of Representatives in 1849 and the Alabama Senate in 1851. At the onset of the American Civil War, Smith was elected to represent the State of Alabama in the Provisional Confederate Congress from 1861 to 1862. He later served as a Colonel of the 36th Alabama Infantry Regiment. In an 1861 speech, Smith stated that Alabama declared its secession from the Union over the issue of slavery, which he referred to as "the negro quarrel". In the speech, he praised the Confederate Constitution for its un-euphemistic protections of the right to own slaves:

We have dissolved the late Union chiefly because of the negro quarrel. Now, is there any man who wished to reproduce that strife among ourselves? And yet does not he, who wished the slave trade left for the action of Congress, see that he proposed to open a Pandora's box among us and to cause our political arena again to resound with this discussion. Had we left the question unsettled, we should, in my opinion, have sown broadcast the seeds of discord and death in our Constitution. I congratulate the country that the strife has been put to rest forever, and that American slavery is to stand before the world as it is, and on its own merits. We have now placed our domestic institution, and secured its rights unmistakably, in the Constitution. We have sought by no euphony to hide its name. We have called our negroes "slaves", and we have recognized and protected them as persons and our rights to them as property.

— Robert Hardy Smith, 1861

== Death ==
Smith died in Mobile, Alabama on March 13, 1878, and was buried at the Magnolia Cemetery.
