= Henry Cox Jones =

American politician

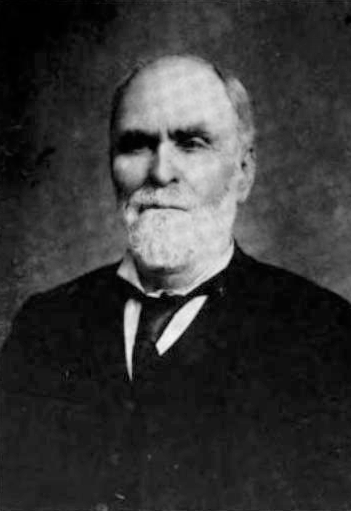

Deputy from Alabama to the Provisional Congress of the Confederate States
- In office April 29, 1861 – February 17, 1862
- Preceded by: Thomas Fearn
- Succeeded by: Constituency abolished

Personal details
- Born: January 23, 1821 Franklin County, Alabama, U.S.
- Died: June 20, 1913 (aged 92) Florence, Alabama, U.S.
- Resting place: Florence Cemetery, Florence, Alabama,

Henry Cox Jones (January 23, 1821 – June 20, 1913) was an American politician who served as a Deputy from Alabama to the Provisional Congress of the Confederate States from April 1861 to February 1862.

== Biography ==
Henry Cox Jones was born in Franklin County, Alabama, and later served as a state court judge in 1841, in the state house of representatives in 1842, and in the state senate in 1853. He was elected to the Provisional Congress of the Confederate States to replace Thomas Fearn and served in that capacity from April 1861 to February 1862.

A graduate of LaGrange College, he and his wife Martha Louisa Keyes had 8 children. He was a member of the Democratic Party.

Political offices
Preceded by Thomas Fearn	Delegate from Alabama to the Provisional Congress of the Confederate States; 1861–1862	Succeeded by Constituency abolished
