= Wiley P. Harris =

American politician

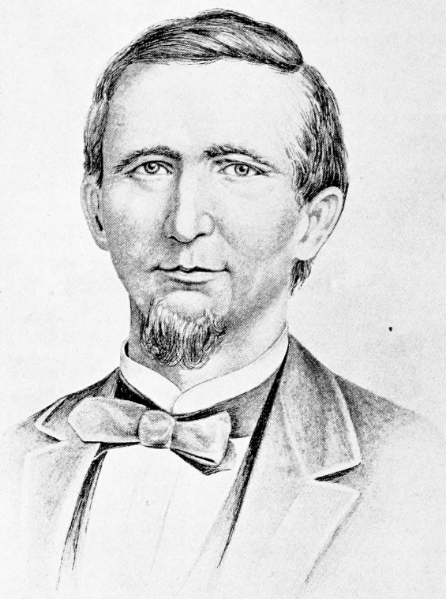

Deputy from Mississippi to the Provisional Congress of the Confederate States
- In office February 4, 1861 – February 17, 1862
- Preceded by: New constituency
- Succeeded by: Constituency abolished

Member of the U.S. House of Representatives from Mississippi's 4th district
- In office March 4, 1853 – March 3, 1855
- Preceded by: Albert G. Brown
- Succeeded by: William Augustus Lake

Personal details
- Born: Wiley Pope Harris; November 9, 1818 Pike County, Mississippi
- Died: November 9, 1891 (aged 73) Jackson, Mississippi, U.S.
- Party: Democratic Party (United States)
- Education: University of Virginia; Transylvania University

Wiley Pope Harris (November 9, 1818 – December 3, 1891) was a U.S. representative and delegate to the Provisional Congress of the Confederate States from Mississippi.

== Biography ==
Born on November 9, 1818, in Pike County, Mississippi, Harris attended the common schools and the University of Virginia in Charlottesville. He graduated from the law department of Transylvania College, Lexington, Kentucky, in 1840. He was admitted to the bar in 1840 and commenced practice in Gallatin, Mississippi. He was Circuit judge of the second district from 1844 to 1850 and served as member of the State constitutional conventions in 1850, 1861, and 1890.

Harris was elected as a Democrat U.S. Representative to the Thirty-third Congress (March 4, 1853 – March 3, 1855). He declined to run for another term in Congress and resumed the practice of law in Jackson, Mississippi.

During the buildup to the American Civil War, Harris, a staunch secessionist, was elected as a delegate to the Mississippi state secession convention in January, 1861. He was then chosen by the convention to serve as one of Mississippi's delegates to the Provisional Congress of the Confederate States in 1861. Harris was an active member of the Provisional Congress, but chose not to stand for election to the first regular session of the Confederate Congress, leaving his seat in 1862. He then returned to the practice of law in Jackson, and took part in the Mississippi constitutional convention of 1890. He died the following year on December 3, 1891, and was interred in Greenwood Cemetery.

U.S. House of Representatives
Preceded by Albert Brown	Member of the U.S. House of Representatives from Mississippi's 4th congressional district 1853–1855	Succeeded by William Lake
Political offices
New constituency	Deputy from Mississippi to the Provisional Congress of the Confederate States; 1861–1862	Constituency abolished
