= Stephen F. Hale =

American politician

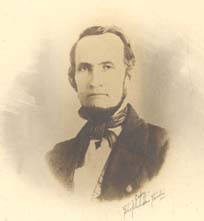

Deputy from Alabama to the Provisional Congress of the Confederate States
- In office February 4, 1861 – February 17, 1862
- Preceded by: New constituency
- Succeeded by: Constituency abolished

Personal details
- Born: Stephen Fowler Hale; January 31, 1816 Crittenden County, Kentucky
- Died: July 18, 1862 (aged 46) Richmond, Virginia
- Resting place: Mesopotamia Cemetery, Eutaw, Alabama
- Spouse: Mary Kirksey
- Children: 5

Military service
- Allegiance: Confederate States
- Branch/service: Confederate States Army
- Years of service: 1861–1862
- Rank: Lieutenant-Colonel
- Unit: 11th Alabama Infantry Regiment
- Battles/wars: American Civil War: Battle of Gaines' Farm (DOW)

Stephen Fowler Hale (January 31, 1816 – July 18, 1862) was an American politician who served as a Deputy from Alabama to the Provisional Congress of the Confederate States from 1861 to 1862. In July 1862, he died of wounds received at the Battle of Gaines' Farm, in Virginia.

== Early life and education ==
Hale was born on January 31, 1816, in Crittenden County, Kentucky. His father, William Hale, was a Union Baptist minister, a South Carolinian, who married a Miss Elizabeth Manahan of the same state. Hale received a private education, then attended Cumberland University and graduated. Hale moved to Alabama around 1837, and taught school in Greene County for a year. He read law while teaching school, and in 1839 graduated from the law school at Lexington, Kentucky.

== Career ==
Upon admission to the Alabama bar, Hale began his legal practice in Eutaw, the Greene County seat. He practiced at different times in association with Alexander Graham and T.C. Clarke. Hale's practice prospered and by 1860 he owned about $8000 in real estate, as well as $47,000 in other property, including enslaved people. Hale's children did not include law students, unlike other area lawyers' households. In that census, Hale owned a dozen enslaved people, ranging from a 59-year-old woman to 10, 2 and year old girls and 13, 5 and infant boys. A decade earlier, Hale similarly owned a dozen slaves, which ranged from a 90-year-old woman and 65-year-old man to a six-year-old girl and three younger boys.

== Personal life ==
Hale married native Alabamian Mary Kirksey on June 12, 1844. They had five children by 1860, including a 15, 6 and four year old sons, and 13 and two year old daughters.

== Politician and Mexican War officer ==
In 1843 Greene County voters elected Hale to the State legislature. After serving his term, he concentrated on his legal practice and private life until the outbreak of the Mexican War in 1846, when Hele volunteered and was elected lieutenant of a company. He served in Mexico until the conclusion of peace in 1848, he then returned to Eutaw and his law practice. He was the nominee of his party for congress in 1853, but was defeated; was elected to the legislature again in 1857; was re-elected in 1859; and was Grand Master of the Grand Lodge of Alabama in 1859.

In December 1860, Hale, who was Alabama's commissioner to State of Kentucky at the time, wrote to that state's governor of Alabama's justification for secession. In it, he voiced support for the Dred Scott decision, condemned the Republican Party, and stated that the state's secession, which would perpetuate slavery, was the only way to prevent prospective freedmen, whom Hale referred to as "half-civilized Africans", from raping southern "wives and daughters":

[I]n the South, where in many places the African race largely predominates, and, as a consequence, the two races would be continually pressing together, amalgamation, or the extermination of the one or the other, would be inevitable. Can Southern men submit to such degradation and ruin? God forbid that they should. [...] [T]he election of Mr. Lincoln cannot be regarded otherwise than a solemn declaration, on the part of a great majority of the Northern people, of hostility to the South, her property and her institutions - nothing less than an open declaration of war - for the triumph of this new theory of Government destroys the property of the South, lays waste her fields, and inaugurates all the horrors of a San Domingo servile insurrection, consigning her citizens to assassinations, and her wives and daughters to pollution and violation, to gratify the lust of half-civilized Africans.

— Stephen F. Hale, letter to the Governor of Kentucky, December 1860

== American Civil War ==
When the secession ordinance was passed, he was appointed commissioner to Kentucky by Governor Moore and delivered an able address before the legislation at Frankfort. That same year, he was elected to represent his district in the provisional congress of the Confederacy. While holding that position, he was chosen as a lieutenant colonel of the 11th Alabama Infantry Regiment, and repaired with it to Virginia. He remained with that command until after the battle of Seven Pines, when he was temporarily assigned to the Ninth Alabama regiment and led it into battle. The fall of Col. Moore obliged him to return to the Eleventh regiment, which he led at the Battle of Gaines' Mill, sometimes known as the First Battle of Cold Harbor or the Battle of Chickahominy River on June 27, 1862, in Hanover County, Virginia.

This was the third of the Seven Days Battles (Peninsula Campaign, March–July 1862). Original documentation of the battle, at the National Archives, Washington DC, states "S.F. Hale, Lt. Col 11th Ala. Regt. Appears on a Report of casualties, of the 4th Brigade, Longstreet's Division, in the action at Gaines' Mill, Va., June 27, 1862, Remarks: Dangerously wounded".

== Death ==
Hale died of wounds on July 18, 1862, at Richmond, after lingering for 22 days. He was laid to rest in Mesopotamia Cemetery (Oak Hill), Greene County, Alabama, Burial Row/Column 34/34. His tombstone bears the epitaph "Statesman, Jurist, Patriot, Soldier & Christian Gentleman"

== Legacy ==
Hale County, Alabama (established 1867), is named after him.

Political offices
New constituency	Deputy from Alabama to the Provisional Congress of the Confederate States; 1861–1862	Constituency abolished
