= Colin J. McRae =

American politician

Deputy from Alabama to the Provisional Congress of the Confederate States
- In office February 4, 1861 – February 17, 1862
- Preceded by: New constituency
- Succeeded by: Constituency abolished

Personal details
- Born: Colin John McRae; October 22, 1812 Anson County, North Carolina, U.S.
- Died: February 1877 (aged 64) Puerto de Caballos, British Honduras (present-day Puerto Cortés, Belize)
- Party: Democratic
- Relations: John J. McRae (brother)

Colin J. McRae (born Colin John McRae; October 22, 1812 – February 1877) was an American politician who had served as a Deputy from Alabama to the Provisional Congress of the Confederate States from 1861 to 1862.

== Biography ==
Colin J. McRae was born on October 22, 1812, in Anson County, North Carolina. His brother, John J. McRae, served as the 21st Governor of Mississippi (1854–1857). Before the Civil War, McRae was a merchant from Mobile, Alabama. He co-owned a foundry in Selma, Alabama, which made ammunition and iron plate for gunboats. Some of these gunboats were used during the war.

McRae served as Confederate States Financial Agent in Europe from 1862 to 1865.

In 1867, McRae moved to Puerto de Caballos, British Honduras (present-day Puerto Cortés, Belize), where he purchased land and ran a plantation and mercantile business centered on mahogany. McRae died there in February 1877. He bequeathed the plantation and mercantile business to his sister and her husband. They leased the plantation to tenants until 1894. The location of his grave, in Belize, is unknown.

In October 2011, a college student at the University of New Hampshire found relics of his Belize plantation house on an archeological expedition in the middle of the Belize Valley. His records were found in Monterey Place in Mobile, Alabama. They are held at the South Carolina Confederate Relic Room and Military Museum, in Columbia, South Carolina.

== See also ==
- Confederate settlements in British Honduras

Political offices
New constituency	Deputy from Alabama to the Provisional Congress of the Confederate States; 1861–1862	Constituency abolished
