= Richard Wilde Walker =

American judge (1823–1874)

Confederate States Senator from Alabama
- In office February 17, 1864 – March 18, 1865
- Preceded by: Clement Clay
- Succeeded by: Constituency abolished

Deputy from Alabama to the Provisional Congress of the Confederate States
- In office February 4, 1861 – February 17, 1862
- Preceded by: New constituency
- Succeeded by: Constituency abolished

Personal details
- Born: February 16, 1823 Huntsville, Alabama
- Died: June 16, 1874 (aged 51) Huntsville, Alabama
- Party: Democratic

Richard Wilde Walker (February 16, 1823 – June 16, 1874) was an American politician and judge in Alabama.

== Biography ==
Walker was born in Huntsville, Alabama in 1823. He was the son of John Williams Walker, the brother of Percy Walker and LeRoy Pope Walker, and father of Richard Wilde Walker, Jr. Richard Walker, Sr. served in the Alabama state legislature from 1851 to 1855, and served as Associate Justice of the Alabama Supreme Court in 1859. Walker represented Alabama in the provisional C.S. Congress from 1861 to 1862. He also served as a Confederate States Senator from 1864 to 1865. he died in Huntsville at age 51.

Political offices
| New constituency | Deputy from Alabama to the Provisional Congress of the Confederate States; 1861–1862 | Constituency abolished |
Confederate States Senate
| Preceded by Clement Clay | Confederate States Senator (Class 1) from Alabama; 1864–1865; Served alongside: Robert Jemison | Constituency abolished |
