= Thomas Fearn =

American politician (1789–1863)

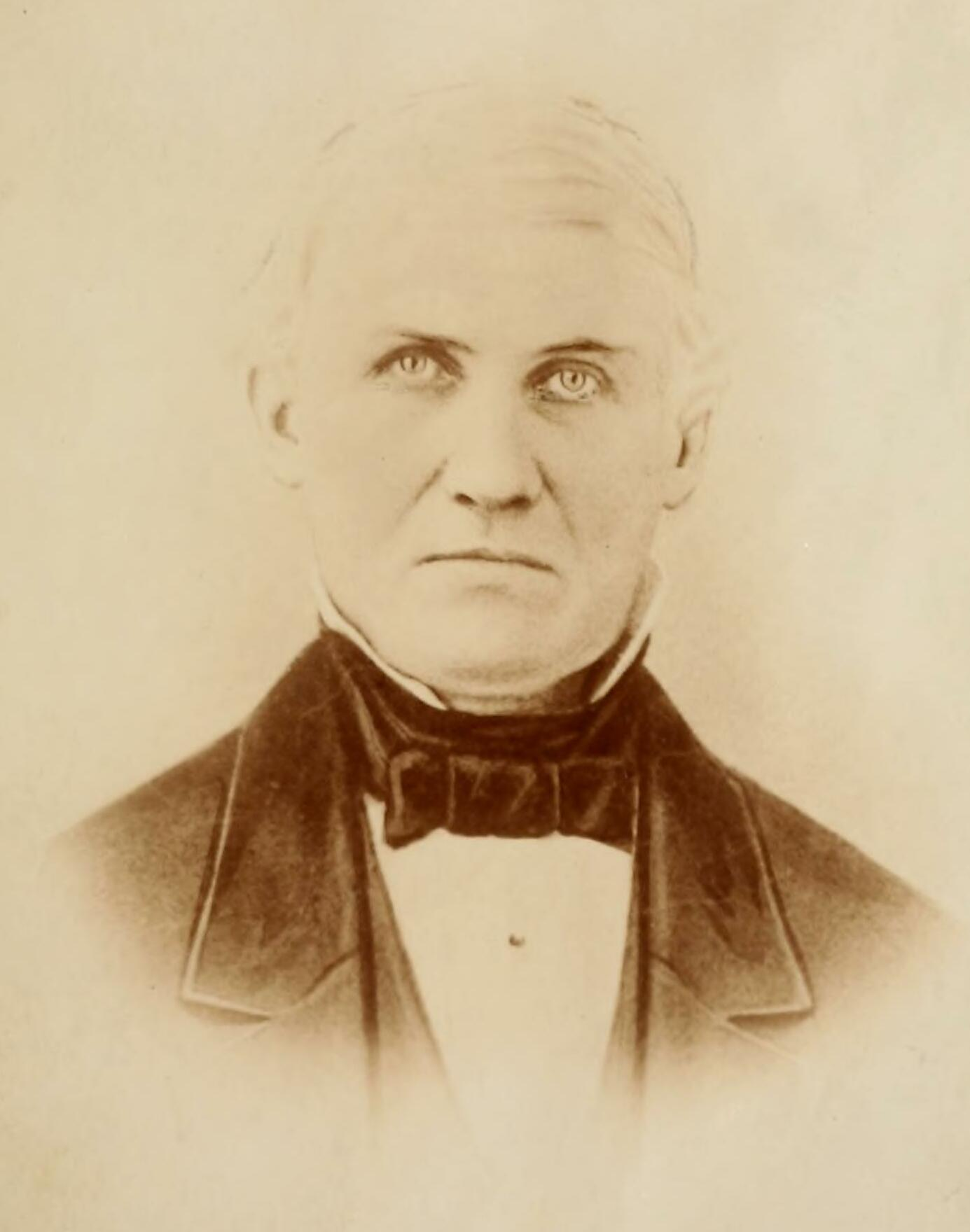

Deputy from Alabama to the Provisional Congress of the Confederate States
- In office February 4, 1861 – April 29, 1861
- Preceded by: New constituency
- Succeeded by: H. C. Jones

Personal details
- Born: November 15, 1789 Pittsylvania County, Virginia
- Died: January 16, 1863 (aged 73) Huntsville, Alabama
- Resting place: Maple Hill Cemetery, Huntsville, Alabama

Thomas Fearn (November 15, 1789 – January 16, 1863) was an American medical doctor, businessman, and politician who played a significant role in the early development of Huntsville, Alabama. He served as a Deputy from Alabama to the Provisional Congress of the Confederate States in 1861.

== Biography ==
Thomas Fearn was born on November 15, 1789, in Pittsylvania County, Virginia, to Thomas Fearn and Mary Burton Fearn. He had several siblings and half-siblings from his father's previous marriage. He graduated from Washington Academy (now Washington and Lee University) in 1806 and pursued a medical degree at the Old Medical College in Philadelphia, graduating in 1810.

=== Early Career and Medical Practice ===
After completing his education, Fearn moved to Twickenham (now Huntsville, Alabama) in the Mississippi Territory. He partnered with Dr. John McGhee to establish a successful medical practice that catered to the prominent residents of the area. During the War of 1812 and the Creek War (1813-1814), Fearn served as a military surgeon. He was appointed chief surgeon by General Andrew Jackson and briefly managed the military hospital in Huntsville.

Fearn is credited with discovering the medicinal properties of quinine for treating malaria, which became a significant advancement in the prevention and treatment of the disease. His article on the use of quinine gained widespread recognition.

=== Public Works and Business Ventures ===
Fearn was a major developer in Huntsville along with his brothers George and Robert. He was involved in constructing the Indian Creek Canal, later known as "Fearn’s Canal," which connected Huntsville’s Big Spring to the Tennessee River to facilitate cotton transportation. The canal was completed in 1831 but was eventually replaced by railroads.

In 1836, the Fearn brothers revitalized the Huntsville Water Works, installing modern cast-iron pipes and pumps. Fearn later sold the system to the city in 1858 but retained free water rights for his residence on Franklin Street.

=== Real Estate and Slaveholding ===
Fearn acquired extensive real estate and became a wealthy plantation owner, ultimately possessing 790 acres. By 1860, he was one of the largest slaveholders in Madison County, owning 82 enslaved people, whom he used for both agricultural labor and public works projects.

=== Political career ===
Fearn served multiple terms in the Alabama state legislature and was involved with the Alabama Board of Medical Examiners. In 1861, he was elected as a delegate to the Confederate Constitutional Convention and served briefly as a Deputy in the Provisional Congress of the Confederate States before resigning due to the inconvenience of travel.

=== Civil War and Later Life ===
Despite his initial opposition to secession, Fearn supported Alabama during the American Civil War. In 1862, he was arrested by federal forces for refusing to swear allegiance to the United States but was later released due to his failing health.

Fearn died at his home on Franklin Street in Huntsville on January 16, 1863, from pneumonia. He was buried in Maple Hill Cemetery, Huntsville.

== Legacy ==
Fearn is remembered as an influential figure in the development of Huntsville and as a pioneer in medical practices related to malaria treatment. His former residence is part of the historic Twickenham Historic District.

Political offices
New constituency	Deputy from Alabama to the Provisional Congress of the Confederate States; 1861	Succeeded by H. C. Jones
