= Virginia Washington Monument =

- U.S. National Register of Historic Places
- Virginia Landmarks Register
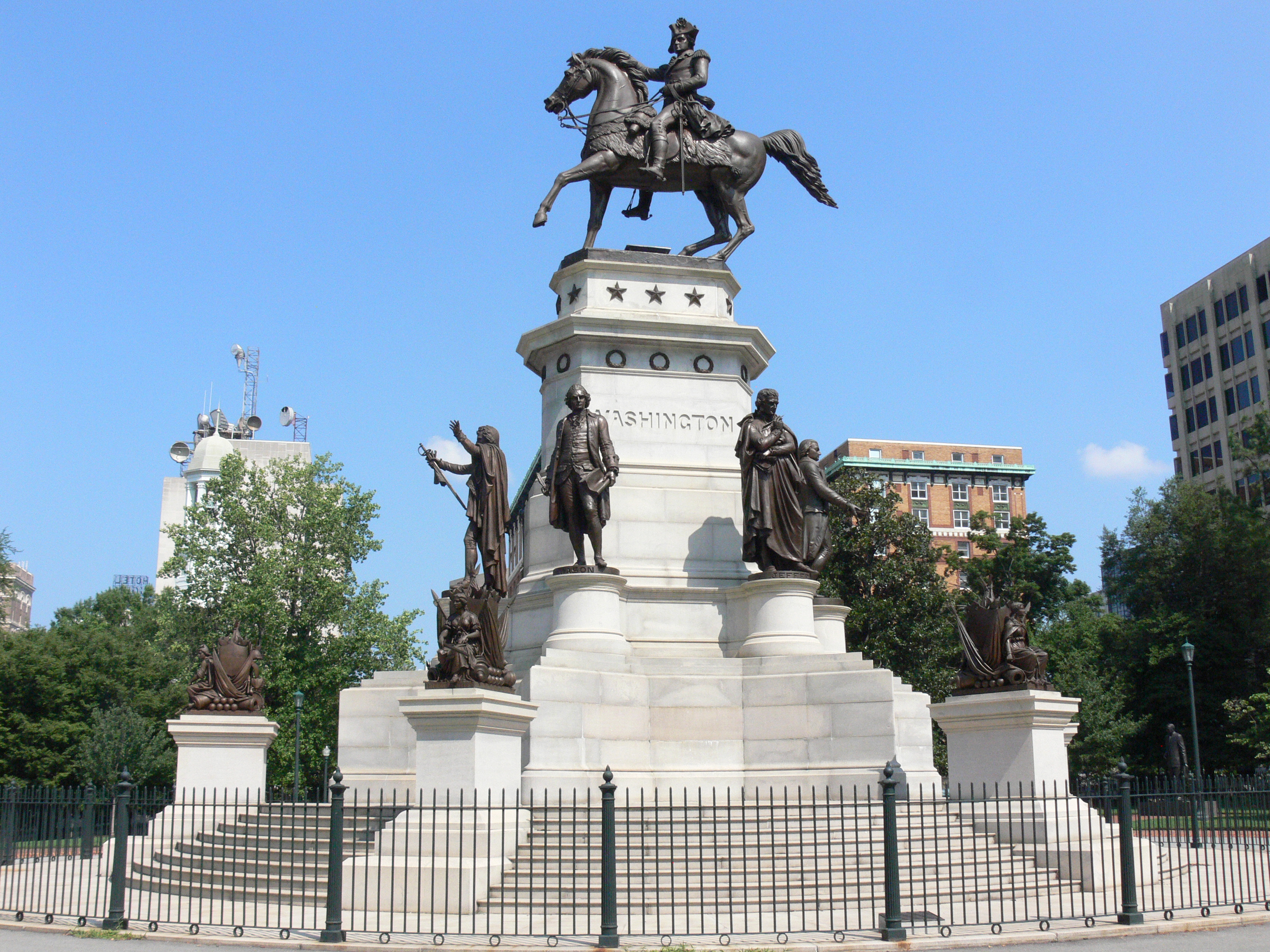

- Location within Virginia Location within the United States
- Location: Capitol Square, Richmond, Virginia
- Coordinates: 37°32′21″N 77°26′4″W
- Area: less than one acre
- Built: 1849–1869
- Architect: Thomas Crawford (sculptor), Randolph Rogers (sculptor)
- Architectural style: Greek Revival
- NRHP reference No.: 03001421
- VLR No.: 127-0189

Significant dates
- Added to NRHP: January 15, 2004
- Designated VLR: June 18, 2003

The Virginia Washington Monument, known locally simply as the Washington Monument, is a 19th-century neoclassical statue of George Washington located on the public square in Richmond, Virginia.

== Description ==
The Washington Monument features a 21-foot (6.4 m), 18,000-pound (8,200 kg) bronze statue of George Washington on horseback. Below Washington, (finished after the American Civil War) includes statues of six other noted Virginians who took part in the American Revolution: Thomas Jefferson, Patrick Henry, Andrew Lewis, John Marshall, George Mason, and Thomas Nelson Jr. The lowest level has bronze female allegorical figures that represent relevant events or themes associated with those men.

On April 30, 1863, Elements of George Washington on horseback on the monument were incorporated into the Seal of the Confederate States of America.

== History ==
It was designed by Thomas Crawford (1814–1857) and completed under the supervision of Randolph Rogers (1825–1892) after Crawford's death. It is the terminus for Grace Street. The cornerstone of the monument was laid in 1850 and it became the second equestrian statue of Washington to be unveiled in the United States (following the one in Union Square, New York City, unveiled in 1856). It was not completed until 1869.

On February 22, 1862, the monument was the location for the second inauguration of the president and vice president of the Confederate States. The presidential oath of office was administered to Jefferson Davis by Judge J.D. Halyburton and the vice presidential oath to Alexander H. Stephens by senate president R.M.T. Hunter.

== See also ==
- Cultural depictions of George Washington
- List of statues of George Washington
- List of statues of Thomas Jefferson
- List of sculptures of presidents of the United States
- National Register of Historic Places listings in Richmond, Virginia
- National symbols of the Confederate States
