= National symbols of the Confederate States of America =

This article is a list of national symbols of the Confederate States of America enacted through legislation. Upon its independence (adoption of the Constitution for the Provisional Government of the Confederate States) on February 8, 1861, and subsequent foundation of the permanent government on February 22, 1862, the Confederate States Congress adopted national symbols distinct from those of the United States.

Name and flag	National Personification	Seal	Motto
Confederate States; Third Flag of the Confederate States (Blood-Stained Banner) Second Flag of the Confederate States (Stainless Banner) First Flag of the Confederate States (Stars and Bars)	George Washington	Seal of the Confederate States	Deo vindice (Latin) "(With) God (as our) defender/protector" Note: The translation is open to some interpretation.

== See also ==
- Washington Monument (Richmond, Virginia)
