= SS Robert M. T. Hunter =

World War II Liberty ship of the United States

- Liberty ship at sea

History

United States
- Name: Robert M. T. Hunter
- Namesake: Robert M.T. Hunter
- Builder: Southeastern Shipbuilding Corporation, Savannah, Georgia
- Yard number: 8
- Way number: 3
- Laid down: 11 December 1943
- Launched: 28 March 1943
- Fate: Scrapped, 1971

General characteristics
- Type: Liberty ship
- Tonnage: 7,000 long tons deadweight (DWT)
- Length: 441 ft 6 in (134.57 m)
- Beam: 56 ft 11 in (17.35 m)
- Draft: 27 ft 9 in (8.46 m)
- Propulsion: Two oil-fired boilers; Triple-expansion steam engine; Single screw; 2,500 hp (1,864 kW)
- Speed: 11 knots (20 km/h; 13 mph)
- Capacity: 9,140 tons cargo
- Complement: 41
- Armament: 1 × Stern-mounted 4 in (100 mm) deck gun; AA guns

SS Robert M. T. Hunter (MC contract 348) was a Liberty ship built in the United States during World War II. She was named after Robert Mercer Taliaferro Hunter, an American statesman.

The ship was laid down on December 11, 1942, then launched on March 28, 1943. She was charter with the Maritime Commission and War Shipping Administration. The ship survived the war only to suffer the same fate as nearly all other Liberty ships that survived did; she was scrapped in 1971.
