= Confederate States Secretary of State =

- Seal of the Confederate States

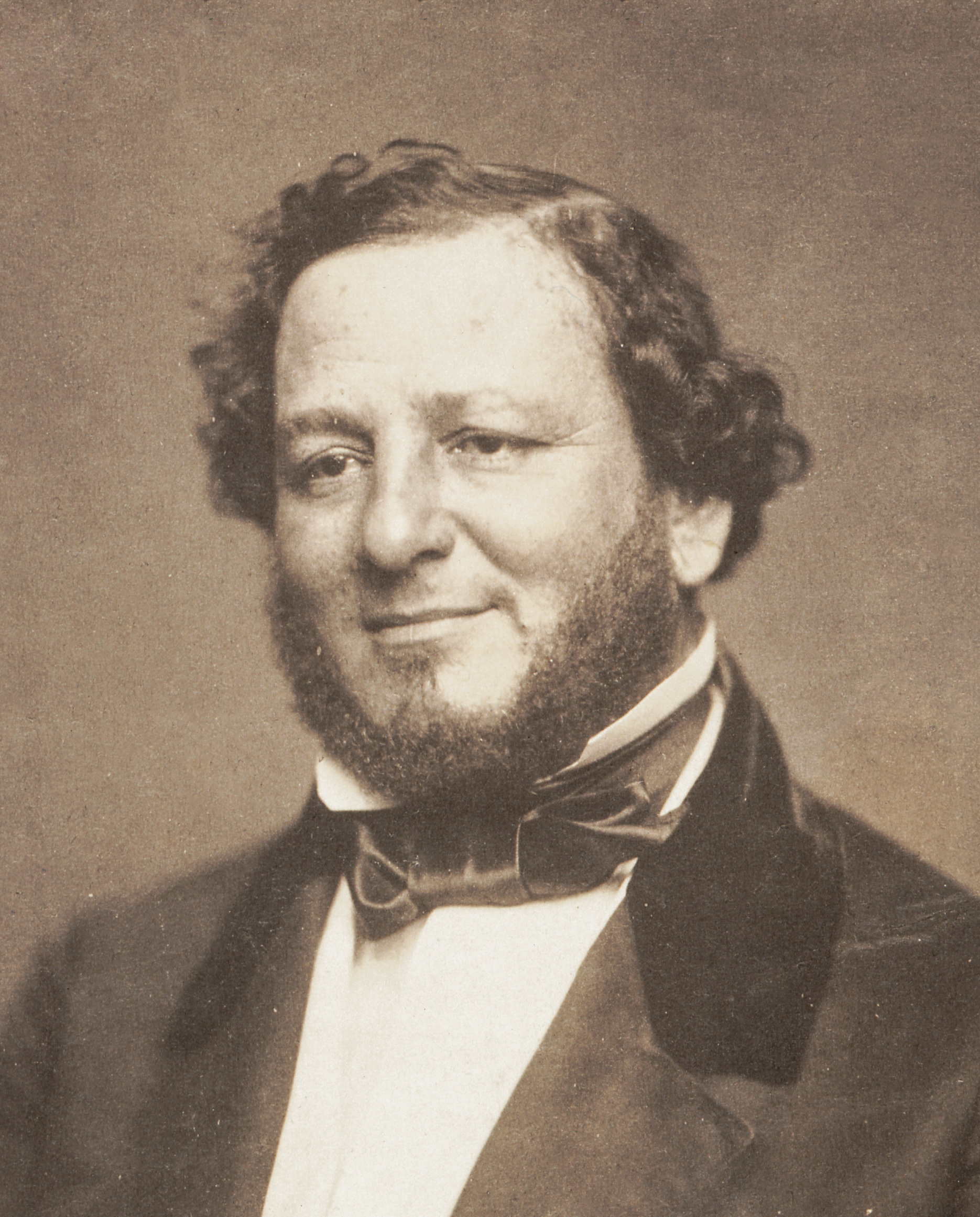
- Longest serving Judah P. Benjamin; March 18, 1862 – May 10, 1865
- Confederate States State Department
- Style: Mr. Secretary
- Status: Abolished
- Member of: The Cabinet
- Reports to: The president
- Seat: Richmond, Virginia
- Appointer: The president with Senate advice and consent
- Term length: No fixed term
- Formation: 25 February 1861
- First holder: Robert Toombs
- Final holder: Judah P. Benjamin
- Abolished: 10 May 1865

The Confederate States secretary of state was the head of the Confederate States Department of State of the Confederate States of America from 1861 to 1865 during the American Civil War. There were three people who served the position during this period, and one who served in an acting capacity.

The role of secretary of state was a cabinet-level position appointed by Jefferson Davis and subject to the confirmation of the Confederate Senate. Despite the limited size of the Confederate States Department of State, the secretary of state was responsible for relations with and attempted recognition of the Confederate States government with foreign countries, recording of governmental records, and approving passports and official governmental documents. The Confederate States Department of State was created on February 21, 1861, and ceased to exist on May 5, 1865, with the dissolution of the Confederacy.

== History and role ==
The Confederate States Department of State was created on February 21, 1861. A secretary of state was to be appointed by the president and approved by the Confederate Congress to direct the Department of State. The secretary oversaw the issuing of passports, which were required for foreign travel and domestic travel between Confederate states. The secretary of state was required to preserve all bills passed by the Confederate Congress and publish new bills in at least three separate newspapers in the Confederacy and distribute each bill to the executive departments of each state. The secretary also authenticated records with a seal of the department and was in possession of the Seal of the Confederate States. Additional roles of the secretary included countersigning commissions and pardons, recording copies of presidential proclamations, taking applications for letters of marque from captains of private vessels, managing copyright records, and recording property that was destroyed by the United States.

The secretary of state directed representatives to discuss disagreements with the United States in Washington, D.C., including requesting for Forts Sumter, Pickens, and Taylor to be evacuated of US troops.

One of the primary role's of the secretary of state was to oversee Confederate representatives abroad and interact with foreign countries as directed by the President. Representatives of the Confederacy negotiated with these foreign countries for recognition of the Confederate government, secured funding, and promoted economic relations. The secretary directed these representatives despite the delay in receiving reports from their assigned countries due to the Union blockade. Assigned countries and representatives included Great Britain (William L. Yancey, then James M. Mason), France (Yancey, then Ambrose Dudley Mann), Belgium (Mann), Spain (Pierre Adolphe Rost). Lucius Quintus Cincinnatus Lamar served as the Special Confederate Commissioner to Russia, while Bishop Patrick Neeson Lynch was granted an audience with Pope Pius IX. The secretary also directed agents to recruit Polish exiles for service in the Confederate States Army, while agents such as Henry Hotze promoted information favorable to the Confederacy in foreign newspapers. The Department of State attempted to obtain supplies from Mexico and carried out assignments in Canada, Cuba, Bermuda, The Bahamas.

The Confederate States Department of State was small and consisted of no more than seven employees, including the secretary, an assistant secretary, researchers, and clerks. On February 27, 1861, the secretary of state was authorized to appoint an assistant secretary of state. William M. Browne served as the first assistant secretary, and after his resignation, the assistant secretary position was filled by successive chief clerks. The secretary of state was paid $6,000 per year, while the assistant secretary of state was paid $3,000 annually.

After the capital of the Confederacy was moved from Montgomery to Richmond in May 1861, the secretary of state's office was located on second floor of the former U.S. Customhouse.

In April 1865, official documents and records relating to the secretary of state and Department of State were transferred to Charlotte, North Carolina. After the collapse of the Confederate government, these records were eventually kept in Hamilton, Ontario, prior to being purchased by the United States Department of the Treasury for $75,000. These records (which included dispatches and correspondences with foreign governments), were used in processing wartime claims. The collection was referred to as the Pickett Papers, after John T. Pickett, a former Confederate agent who sold the collection in 1872. By 1910, the records were transferred to the Library of Congress.

== Secretaries of state ==
Robert Toombs of Georgia became the first Confederate States secretary of state on February 27, 1861. Toombs had previously served as a United States representative and senator. L. Q. Washington, who began serving as a clerk under Toombs, described him as a gifted orator but his "delivery was marred by his vehemence, impetuosity, and consequent imperfect enunciation." Toombs did not spend much time in his office and Washington felt he favored military service over office work. On July 19, 1861, Toombs was commissioned as a brigadier general in the Confederate States Army and resigned as secretary of state five days later. Toombs also served as a delegate to the Provisional Congress of the Confederate States.

Robert M. T. Hunter of Virginia became the second Confederate States secretary of state on July 25, 1861. Hunter was educated as a lawyer at the University of Virginia and had served as a U.S. Representative, Senator, and was the Speaker of the United States House of Representatives from 1839 to 1841. Washington (who by November 1861 was the chief clerk for the secretary of state), described Hunter as being more scholarly and having a greater grasp of public affairs than Toombs. Hunter served as a delegate to the Provisional Congress of the Confederate States, and after being elected as a Confederate States senator, resigned as secretary of state on February 18, 1862.

After Hunter resigned, William M. Browne was promoted to acting secretary of state from assistant secretary of state on February 19, 1862. Browne had previously served as acting secretary of state as early as March 6, 1861, while Toombs was away from his office on business. Browne was originally from County Mayo in Ireland and was criticized for not being a native Southerner. Browne could speak multiple languages and assisted in establishing trade for copper, lead, and military supplies with Mexico. Browne again resumed the role of assistant secretary of state after a permanent replacement was appointed.

On March 25, 1862, Judah P. Benjamin a former U.S. Senator from Louisiana, was appointed as the third Confederate States secretary of state. Benjamin had previously served as the Confederate States Attorney General and Confederate States Secretary of War. Washington, who served as assistant secretary of state after Browne resigned to serve as Davis' aide-de-camp and colonel of cavalry, described Benjamin as an efficient worker who spoke with a "rare eloquence." Benjamin spoke and read multiple languages and frequently counseled with Davis on governmental affairs. Benjamin served as secretary of state until the collapse of the Confederacy.

== List of secretaries of state ==
No.	Portrait	Name (Born-Died)	Term of office			Political Party (Note: While organized political parties did not exist in the Confederacy, most Confederate leaders were members of the Democratic Party before and after the American Civil War.)	Ref.
No.	Portrait	Name (Born-Died)	Took office	Left office	Time in office	Political Party	Ref.
1		Robert Toombs (1810–1885)	February 27, 1861	July 24, 1861	147 days	Democrat	
2		Robert M. T. Hunter (1809–1887)	July 25, 1861	February 18, 1862	208 days	Democrat	
–		William M. Browne (1823–1883); Acting	February 19, 1862	March 24, 1862	33 days	Democrat	
3		Judah P. Benjamin (1811–1884)	March 25, 1862	May 10, 1865	3 years, 46 days	Democrat	

== See also ==
- United States Secretary of State

== Sources ==
- Beers, Henry Putney (1968). A Guide to the Archives of the Government of the Confederate States of America. Washington, D.C.: The National Archives and Records Service. LCCN a68007603.
- Coulter, E. Merton (1967). William Montague Browne: Versatile Anglo-Irish American, 1823-1883 (PDF). Athens, Georgia: University of Georgia Press. ISBN 978-0-8203-3533-9.
- Hubbard, Charles M. (2000). The Burden of Confederate Diplomacy. Knoxville, Tennessee: University of Tennessee Press. ISBN 1-57233-092-9.
- Jones, Charles C. Jr. (1876). A Roster of General Officers, Heads of Departments, Senators, Representatives, Military Organizations, &c., &c., in Confederate Service During the War Between the States. Richmond, Virginia: Southern Historical Society.
- Matthews, James M., ed. (1864). The Statutes at Large of the Provisional Government of the Confederate States of America, from the Institution of the Government, February 8, 1861, to Its Termination, February 18, 1862, Inclusive: Arranged in Chronological Order. Richmond, Virginia: Confederate States Congress.
- The United States Passport: Past, Present, and Future. Washington, D.C.: United States Department of State. 1976. Department of Foreign Service Series 153.
- Van Tyne, Claude Halstead; Leland, Waldo Gifford (1907). Guide to the Archives of the Government of the United States in Washington. Washington, D.C.: Carnegie Institution.
- Washington, L. Q. (1901). Brock, R. A. (ed.). "Confederate States State Department". Southern Historical Society Papers. XXIX. Richmond, Virginia: Southern Historical Society: 341–49.
