= Dieu et mon droit =

Royal motto of the United Kingdom

The motto appears on a scroll beneath the shield on the version of the royal coat of arms of the United Kingdom used outside of Scotland.

Dieu et mon droit (French pronunciation: [djø e mɔ̃ dʁwa], Old French: Deu et mon droit), which means 'God and my right', is the motto of the monarch of the United Kingdom. It appears on a scroll beneath the escutcheon of the version of the coat of arms of the United Kingdom used outside Scotland. The motto is said to have first been used by Richard I (1157–1199) as a battle cry. It was adopted as the royal motto of England by King Henry V (1386–1422) with the phrase "and my right" referring to the divine right of kings.

== Language ==
The motto is French for "God and my right", meaning that the king is "Rex Angliae Dei gratia" ("King of England by the grace of God"). It is used to imply that the monarch of a nation has a God-given (divine) right to rule. Henry V, in adopting it, may have also have intended a reference to his claim to the French crown.

It was not unusual for the royal coat of arms of the Kingdom of England to have a French rather than English motto, given that Norman French was the primary language of the English Royal Court and ruling class following the rule of William the Conqueror of Normandy and later the Plantagenets. Another Old French phrase also appears in the full achievement of the Royal Arms: the motto of the Order of the Garter, Honi soit qui mal y pense ("Shamed be the one who thinks ill of it"), appears on a representation of a garter behind the shield. Modern French spelling has changed honi to honni, but the motto has not been updated.

== Other translations ==
Dieu et mon droit has been translated in several ways, including "God and my right", "God and my right hand", "God and my lawful right", and "God and my right shall me defend".

The literal translation of Dieu et mon droit is "God and my right". However, Kearsley's Complete Peerage, published in 1799, translates it to mean "God and my right hand" (in standard French that would be Dieu et ma main droite or Dieu et ma droite, not mon droit). The Kearsley volume appeared during publication of the 1st edition (1796–1808) of the German Brockhaus Enzyklopädie, which emphasised the raising of the "right hand" during installations and coronations of German Kings.

== Use as royal motto ==
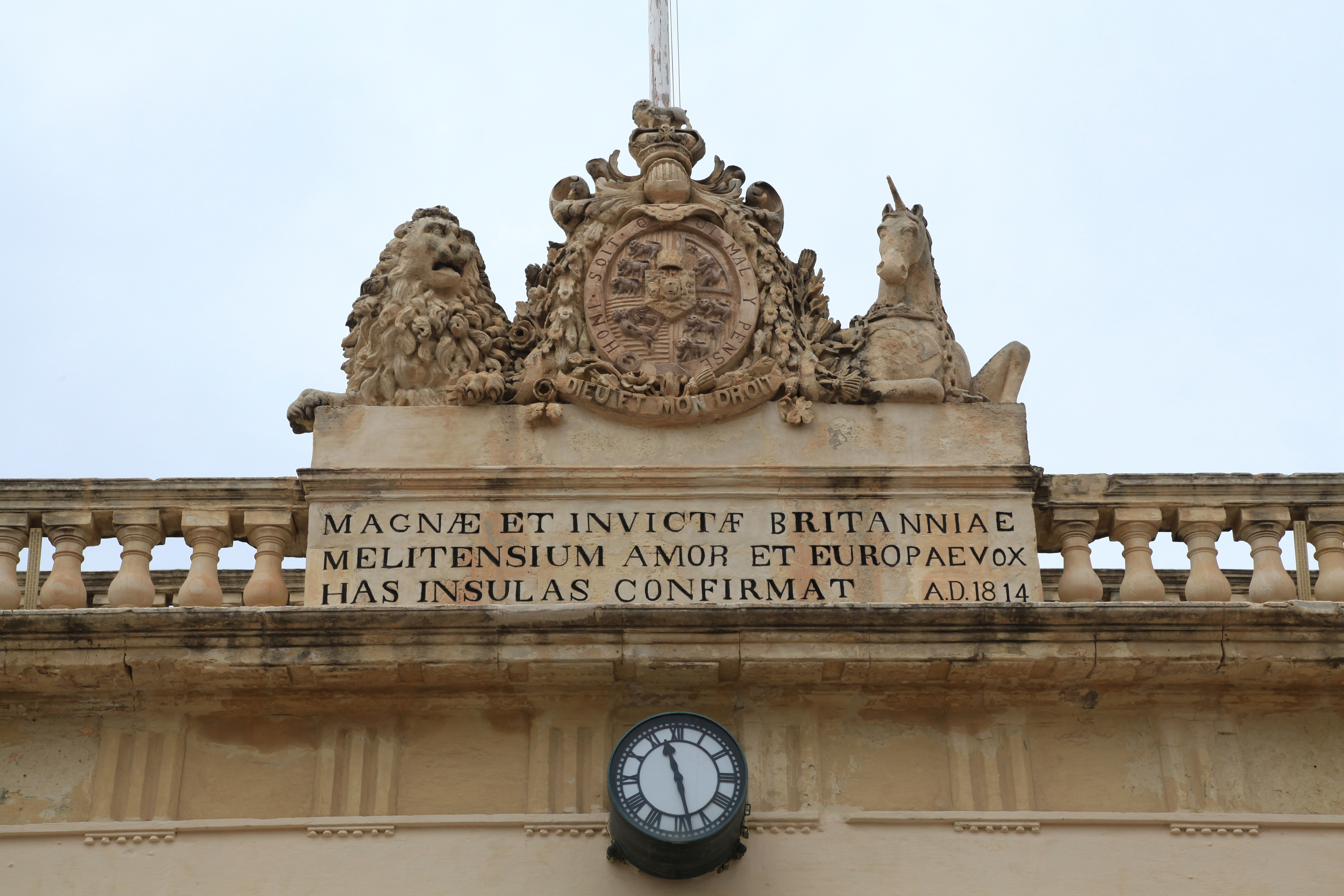
The British coat of arms with the motto on the Main Guard in Valletta, Malta

Dieu et mon droit has generally been used as the motto of English monarchs, and later by British monarchs, since being adopted by Henry V. It was first used as a battle cry by King Richard I in 1198 at the Battle of Gisors, when he defeated the forces of Philip II of France and after he made it his motto. Medieval Europeans did not believe that victory necessarily went to the side with the better army, but (as they also viewed personal trial by combat) to the side that God viewed with favour. Hence Richard wrote after his victory "It is not us who have done it but God and our right through us". So after his victories on the crusades "Richard was speaking what he believed to be the truth when he told the Holy Roman Emperor: 'I am born of a rank which recognises no superior but God'".

Alternatively, the Royal Arms may depict a monarch's personal motto. For example, Elizabeth I and Queen Anne's often displayed Semper Eadem; Latin for "Always the same", and James I's depicted Beati Pacifici, Latin for "Blessed are the peacemakers".

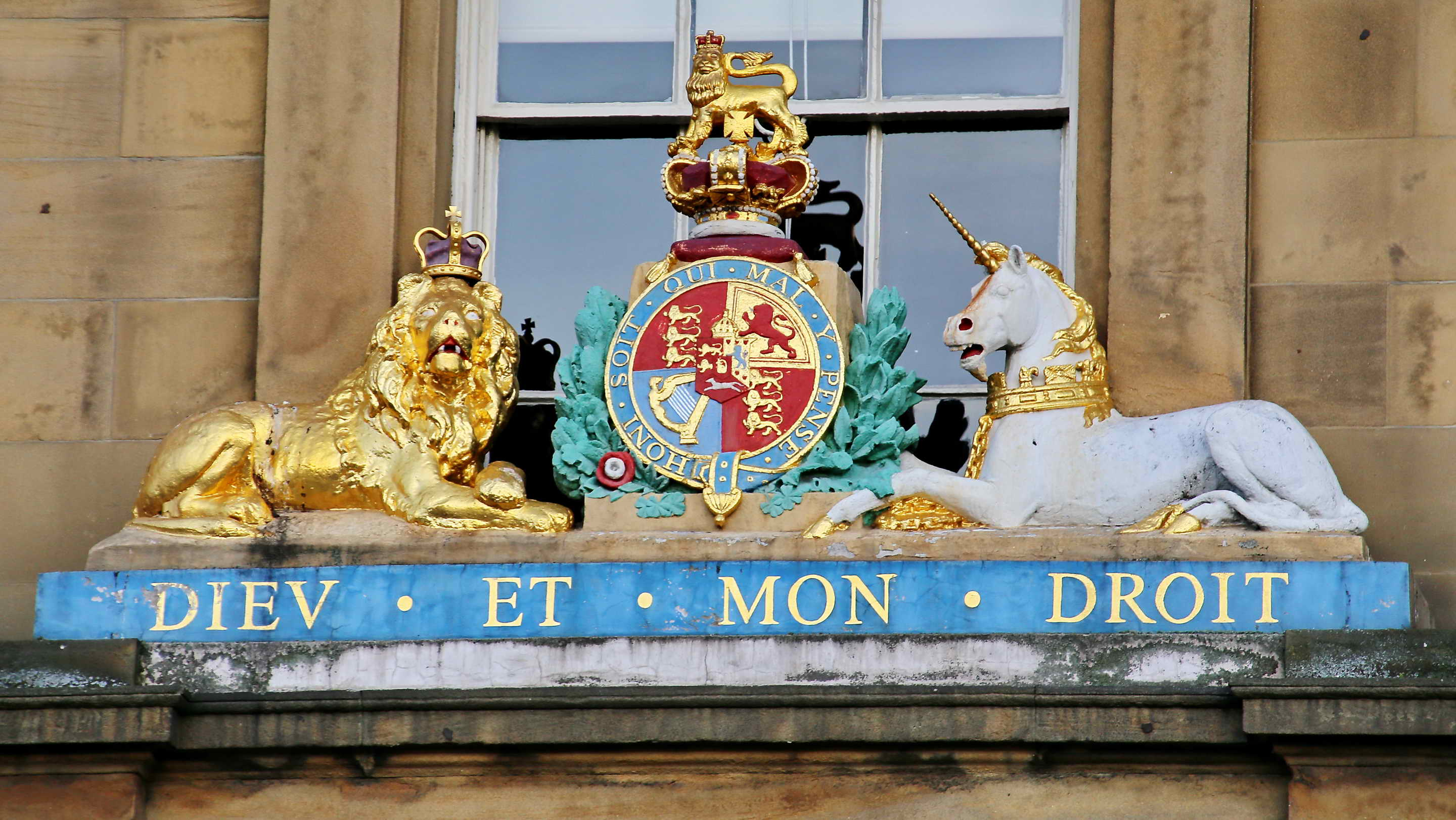
Dieu et mon droit on the Newcastle upon Tyne Customs House (1766)

== Current usages ==
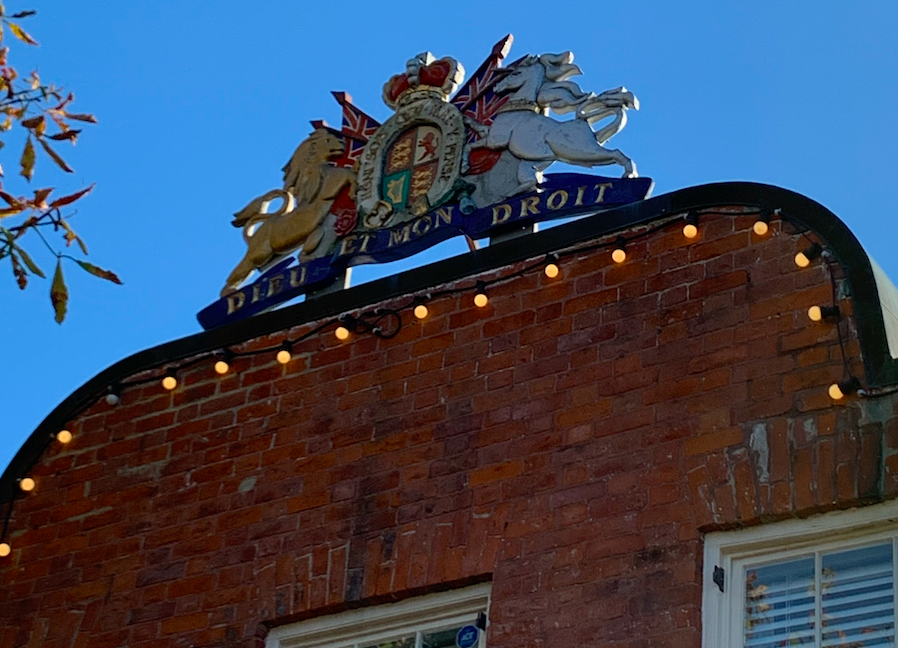
An 1825 customs building in Niagara-on-the-Lake, Ontario, bearing the Royal coat of arms

Dieu et mon droit has been adopted along with the rest of the Royal Coat of Arms by The Times as part of its masthead. When it incorporated the Coat of Arms in 1875, half the newspapers in London were also doing so. Since 1982 the paper abandoned the use of the current Royal Coat of Arms and returned to using the Hanoverian coat of arms of 1785.

== Variants ==
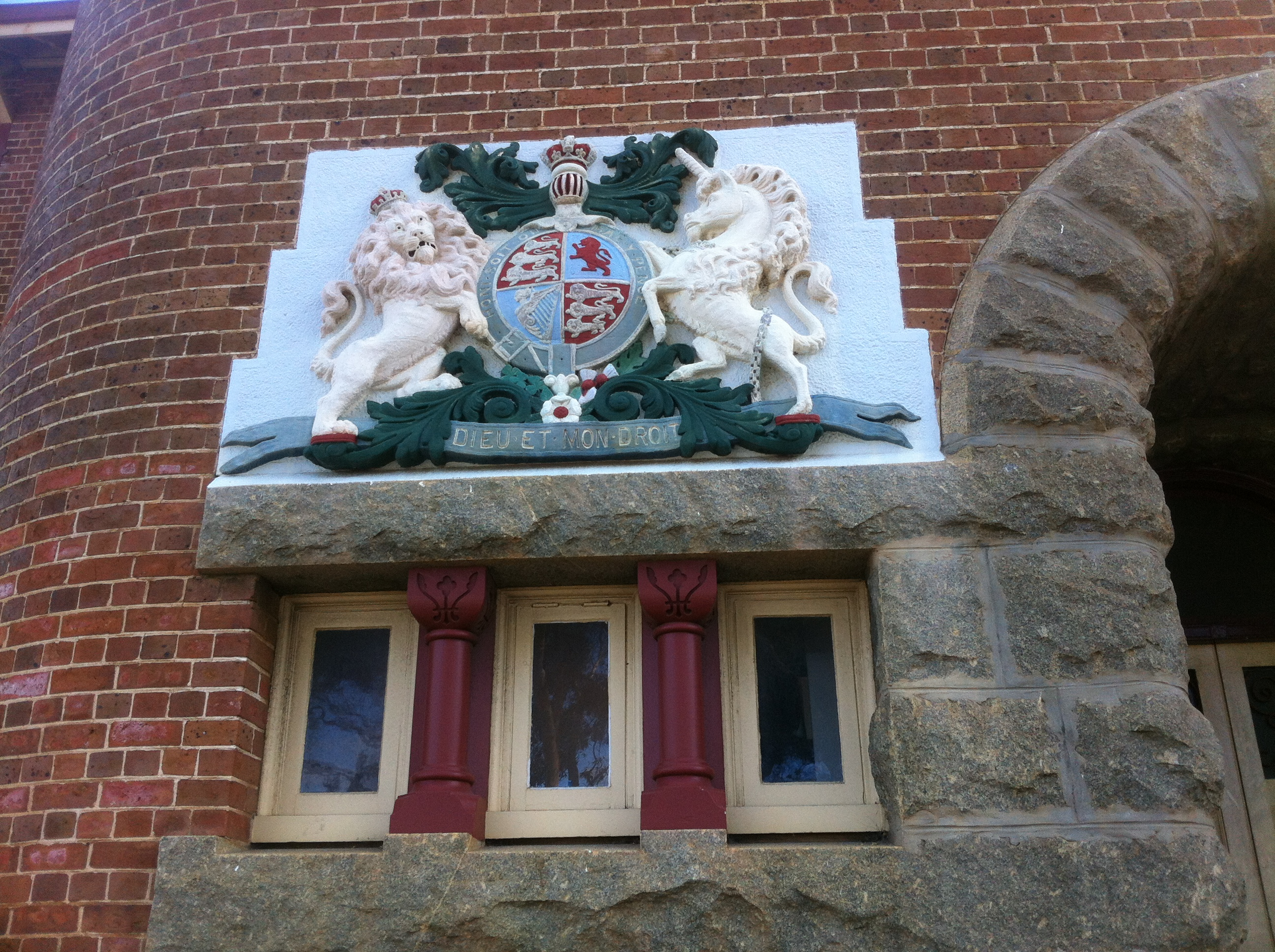
Dieu et mon droit motto on Albany Courthouse (1898), Western Australia

The Hearts of Oak, a revolutionary New York militia commanded by Alexander Hamilton, wore badges of red tin hearts on their jackets with the words "God and Our Right".

Diderot's Encyclopédie lists the motto as Dieu est mon droit, which Susan Emanuel translated as "God is my right". The motto in this form was also cited by Henry Hudson in 1612 and Joseph de La Porte in 1772.

== See also ==
- In my defens God me defend, the motto of the British monarch for use in Scotland
- Nemo me impune lacessit, the motto of Scotland
- Ich dien, the motto of the Prince of Wales
- Deus meumque ius
- List of national mottos
- Gott mit uns
- Deo vindice
