= President of the Confederate States of America =

Head of the Confederate States

President of the Confederate States
- Seal of the Confederate States

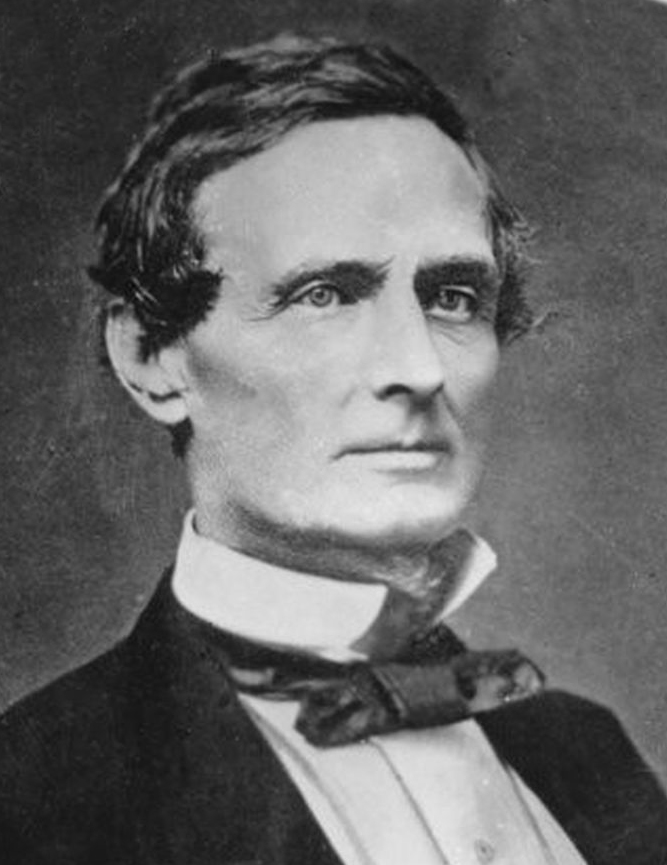
- Only officeholder Jefferson Davis; February 18, 1861 – May 5, 1865 (Note: The end of Jefferson Davis' presidency (as well as the abolition of the office) is generally reckoned to be the date Davis and his Cabinet declared the Confederacy dissolved, which was May 5, 1865. Although Davis was not apprehended by the Union Army until May 10, he stopped attempting to exercise the powers and duties of his office after May 5.); Provisional: February 18, 1861 – February 22, 1862 (Note: Jefferson Davis initially took an oath of office as President of the Confederate States of America on February 18, 1861, in Montgomery, Alabama, under conditions set forth in the Constitution of the Provisional Government. After being elected to the presidency, he took another oath of office (this time for a six-year term) on February 22, 1862, in Richmond, Virginia, as prescribed in the "permanent" Constitution of the Confederate States.)
- Style: His Excellency
- Type: Head of state; Head of government
- Residence: Executive Mansion, Montgomery, Alabama (1861); Executive Mansion, Richmond, Virginia (1861–1865)
- Seat: Alabama State Capitol, Montgomery, Alabama (1861); President's Office, Custom House, Richmond, Virginia (1861–1865); Sutherlin House, Danville, Virginia (1865)
- Appointer: Congress (provisional); Electoral College (permanent)
- Term length: One year (provisional); Six years (permanent)
- Constituting instrument: Constitution of the Confederate States
- Formation: February 18, 1861 (provisional); February 22, 1862 (permanent)
- First holder: Jefferson Davis
- Final holder: Jefferson Davis
- Abolished: May 5, 1865
- Salary: CS$25,000 per year

The president of the Confederate States was the head of state and head of government of the unrecognized breakaway Confederate States of America. The president was the chief executive of the federal government and commander-in-chief of the Confederate Army and Navy.

Article II of the Constitution of the Confederate States vested executive power of the Confederacy in the president. The power included execution of law, along with responsibility for appointing executive, diplomatic, regulatory and judicial officers, and concluding treaties with foreign powers with the advice and consent of the senate. He was further empowered to grant reprieves and pardons, and convene and adjourn either or both houses of Congress under extraordinary circumstances.

The president was indirectly elected by the people through the Electoral College to a six-year term, and was one of two nationally elected Confederate officers, the other being the vice president. On February 18, 1861, Jefferson Davis became president of the provisional government, as well as the only person to assume the position. On February 22, 1862, he became president of the permanent government and served in that capacity until the Confederacy's military collapse. The Confederate States cabinet declared the Confederacy dissolved May 5, 1865, after which Davis stopped attempting to exercise his office's powers and duties. May 5 is therefore generally considered to be the day the Confederate States of America (and its presidency) were formally abolished. Davis himself was captured by elements of the United States Cavalry five days later.

== Powers and duties ==
The constitutional powers of the president of the Confederate States were similar to those of the president of the United States. The permanent Confederate States Constitution made him commander-in-chief of the Army, Navy, and militia of the confederated states when called into service of the Confederate States. He was also empowered to grant reprieves and pardons for offenses against the Confederate States. He was authorized to make treaties; to nominate and appoint diplomatic representatives, judges, and other officers of the Confederate States (including the heads of the executive departments) by and with the consent of the Confederate States Senate; and to remove such representatives and officers. During a Senate recess, he could fill vacancies but not reappoint persons previously rejected by the Senate. He was to supply Congress with information, recommend legislation, receive ambassadors and other public ministers, see that federal laws were faithfully executed, and commission all officers of the military and naval forces of the Confederate States.

One power of the Confederate president that differed from the United States president was the power of line-item veto, which was mostly delegated to U.S. governors. Davis did not use the line-item veto before the end of the war.

== Election and oath ==
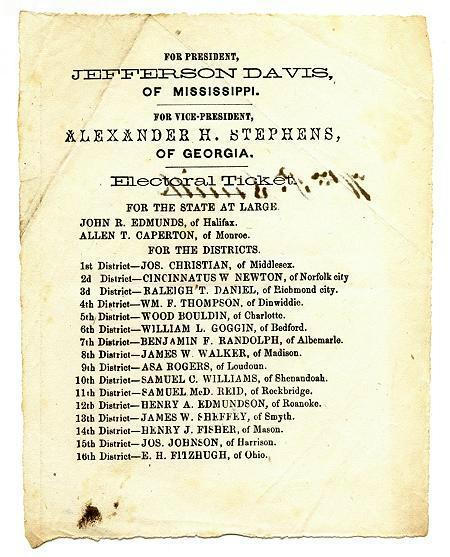
Confederate election ballot, Virginia, November 6, 1861

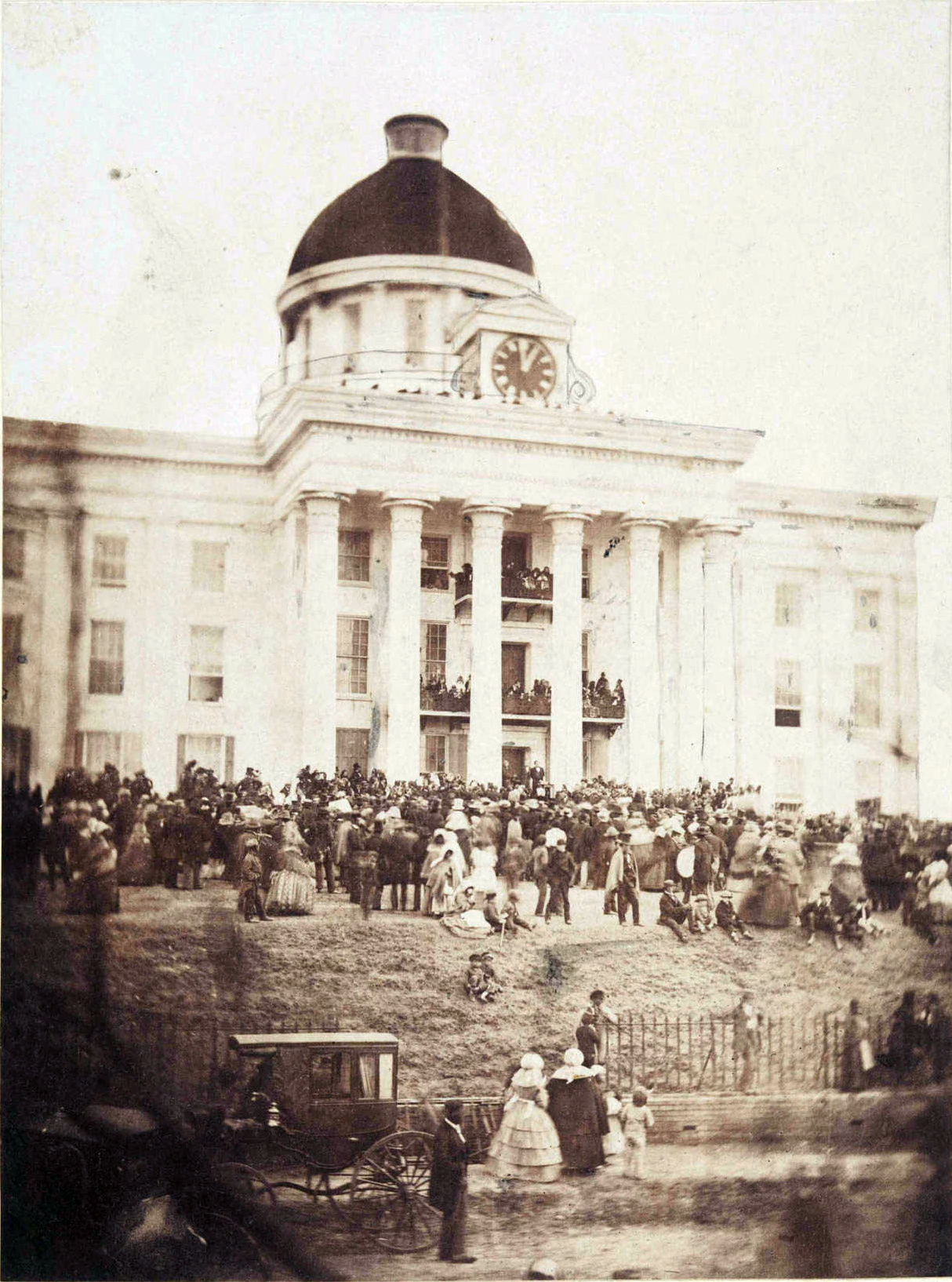
Inauguration of Jefferson Davis at the Capitol in Montgomery, Alabama, 1861

On February 9, 1861, the provisional congress at Montgomery unanimously elected Jefferson Davis president and Alexander H. Stephens vice president. Stephens, who was a delegate to Congress from Georgia, was inaugurated on February 11. Davis was inaugurated on February 18 upon his arrival from Mississippi, where he had gone upon his resignation from the U.S. Senate. Confederate presidents were to be limited to a single term. Davis and Stephens were elected on Wednesday, November 6, 1861 for six-years terms, as provided by the permanent constitution. The capital had been moved in June 1861 to Richmond and the inauguration took place at the statue of Washington on Capitol Square on February 22, 1862.

Before Davis entered on the execution of his office as President of the Confederate States, he was constitutionally required to take the following oath or affirmation:

I do solemnly swear (or affirm) that I will faithfully execute the office of President of the Confederate States, and will, to the best of my ability, preserve, protect, and defend the Constitution thereof.

== Compensation ==
In 1861, the president of the Confederate States earned a CS$25,000 annual salary, along with an expense account, and a nontaxable travel account. The President's Office was located on the second floor of the Custom House on Main Street, a structure which also housed the Cabinet Room and the State and Treasury Departments. The City of Richmond purchased the White House of the Confederacy (Brockenbrough House) for presentation to the Confederate government for use as an executive mansion. Davis declined to accept the gift, but the mansion was leased for his use. Referred to as the "White House of the Confederacy" or the "Grey House," the mansion was used by Davis until Richmond fell to the Union Army in early April 1865. The residence later became a repository for documents, relics, and pictures, and in 1896, it was redesignated the Confederate Museum.

== Office of the Confederate President ==
As of 1864, Davis had a private secretary, Burton N. Harrison, of Mississippi, and five aides-de-camp: Col. William M. Browne of Georgia, Col. James Chestnut of South Carolina, Col. William P. Johnston of Kentucky, Col. G. W. C. Lee of Virginia, and Col. John T. Wood.

== See also ==
- Congress of the Confederate States
- Jefferson Davis Presidential Library and Museum
- Postage stamps and postal history of the Confederate States
- Treatment of slaves in the United States
- Vice President of the Confederate States of America
