= William M. Browne =

American politician (1823–1883)

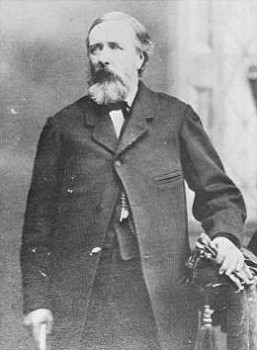

Acting Confederate States Secretary of State
- In office February 18, 1862 – March 18, 1862
- President: Jefferson Davis
- Preceded by: Robert Hunter
- Succeeded by: Judah Benjamin

Personal details
- Born: July 7, 1823 County Mayo, Ireland, U.K.
- Died: April 28, 1883 (aged 59) Athens, Georgia, U.S.
- Resting place: Oconee Hill Cemetery; Athens, Georgia, U.S.
- Party: Democratic
- Spouse: Eliza Jane Beket

Military service
- Allegiance: Confederate States
- Branch/service: Confederate States Army
- Years of service: 1862–1865
- Rank: Colonel (CSA)
- Commands: 1st Virginia Cavalry Battalion, Local Defense; Browne's Local Brigade
- Battles/wars: American Civil War: Savannah Campaign

William Montague Browne (July 7, 1823 – April 28, 1883) was a prominent Confederate politician and American newsman. During the American Civil War, he served as Acting Secretary of State for the Confederacy in 1862 and as a temporary brigadier general in the Confederate States Army. When he was not confirmed to that rank by the Confederate Senate, he reverted to his permanent grade of colonel.

== Early life ==
Browne was born in County Mayo in Ireland on July 7, 1823 as (apparently the fifth) son of D. Geoffrey Browne, MP. Definite information about some events, positions or locations in his early life, including an uncertain higher education, alleged service in the British Army during the Crimean War, diplomatic services and his initial whereabouts in the United States during the early 1850s, appears to be unavailable. Residing in New York City by 1855 or 56, he wrote for the New York Journal of Commerce. He associated with the Democratic Party and later became a clerk in the House of Customs. In 1859 Browne moved to Washington D.C. and wrote for the pro-administration Washington Constitution.

== American Civil War ==
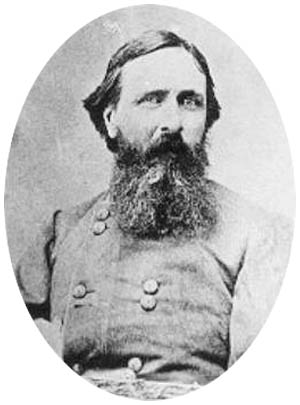
Browne in uniform

In 1861 Browne, known as Constitution Browne by then, had become a well-connected proponent of secession and moved to Athens, Georgia, after that. A favorite of both the just elected Confederate President Jefferson Davis and his Secretary of State Robert Toombs he was appointed Assistant Secretary of State. On several occasions in 1861 and 62 Browne acted as interim Secretary. Living in Richmond, Virginia with his wife, Eliza Jane Beket, he had two permanent houseguests. One was Howell Cobb, a former United States Secretary of the Treasury and an old and close friend from Washington, who now was the President of Provisional Confederate Congress. The other was his younger brother, Colonel Thomas R. R. Cobb.

Browne resigned in March 1862 and was assigned as military aide-de-camp to President Davis, with the rank of a Colonel of cavalry. Beside his main duty on the staff he also was assigned to command a battalion of local defense cavalry. On April 5, 1864 Davis appointed Browne as Commandant of Conscription in Georgia, where Governor Joseph E. Brown consistently hindered the Confederate war efforts. Browne was a natural choice as a Georgia resident who had inspected and reported about the conscription in Georgia before.

In late 1864 Browne, while still enforcing conscription, was detached to commanded a small brigade of reserves during the Savannah Campaign. In December, Browne was promoted to temporary brigadier general, to rank from November 11, 1864. He resumed his conscription duty in January 1865. In February 1865 his promotion was not confirmed by the Confederate Senate and he reverted to colonel. Despite this he later was excluded from amnesty on grounds of being both a civil officeholder and a military officer ranking higher than colonel. He was paroled on May 8, and pardoned either in late 1865 or 66.

== Later life ==
Afterwards Browne, back in Athens, studied law and was admitted to the bar in 1866. Beside his practice of law he became a newspaper man again when he took over editorship of the Southern Banner in 1868. Despite his position, the Brownes suffered from relative poverty and fragile health.

He was the great-great-uncle of Sir Robert Ricketts, 7th Baronet of Gloucestershire England.

== See also ==
- List of American Civil War generals (Acting Confederate)

== Notes ==
Political offices
Preceded by Robert Hunter	Confederate States Secretary of State; Acting; 1862	Succeeded by Judah Benjamin
