= 1861 Confederate States presidential election =

Election in the Confederate States of America

- November 6, 1861

109 members of the Electoral College 55 electoral votes needed to win
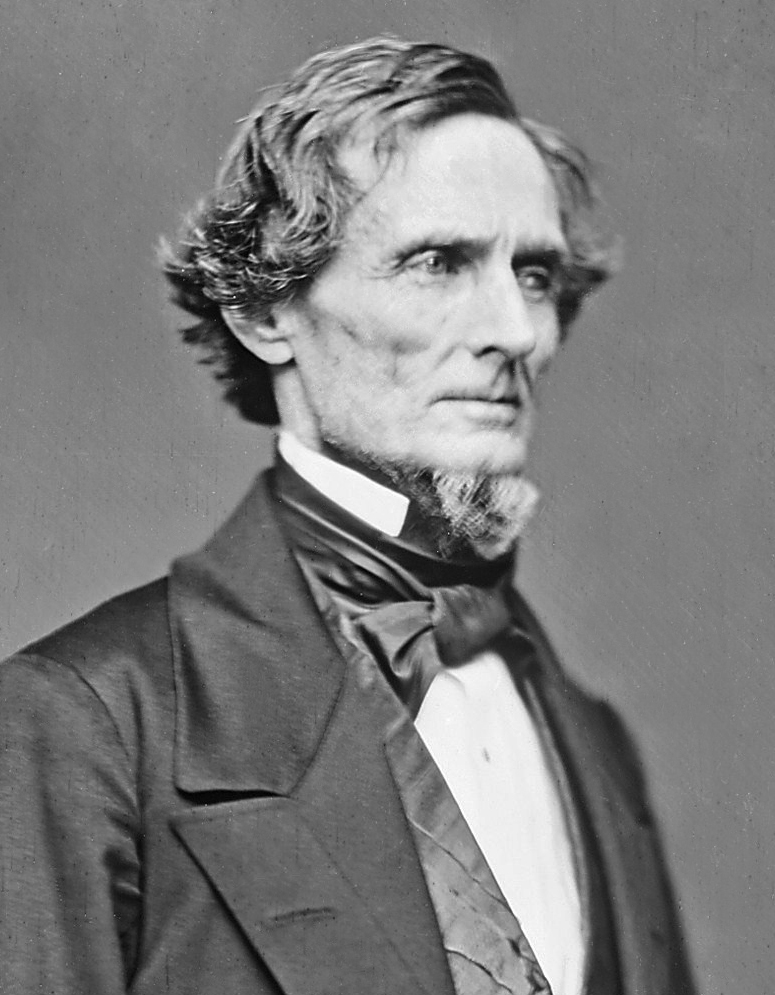
Nominee	Jefferson Davis
Home state	Mississippi
Running mate	Alexander H. Stephens
Electoral vote	109
States carried	11
Popular vote	47,057
Percentage	97.0%
- Presidential election results map. Green denotes states won by Davis/Stephens. Numbers indicate the number of electoral votes allotted to each state.
President before election
Jefferson Davis (Provisional)
Elected President
Jefferson Davis

Presidential elections were held in the Confederate States of America on November 6, 1861. The incumbent provisional president Jefferson Davis and provisional vice president Alexander H. Stephens were elected unopposed. These were the first and only presidential elections held under the Constitution of the Confederate States of the Confederacy. Davis and Stephens's term ended prematurely on May 5, 1865 following the conclusion of the American Civil War, less than three years before they were scheduled to leave office on February 22, 1868.

== Background ==
The Provisional Congress of the Confederate States met at Montgomery, Alabama, on February 4, 1861. They adopted a provisional constitution on February 8, 1861.

On February 9, 1861, Jefferson Davis was elected Provisional President and Alexander H. Stephens was elected Provisional Vice President. Stephens took office on February 11 and Davis took office on February 18, 1861. On March 11, 1861, a permanent Constitution was adopted.

=== Constitutional Provisions ===
Article II Section 1(1) reads: "The executive power shall be vested in a President of the Confederate States of America. He and the Vice President shall hold their offices for the term of six years; but the President shall not be re-eligible."

Article II Section 1(7) of the Confederate Constitution provides citizenship to people "born in the United States prior to the 20th of December, 1860" and also requires candidates for the President of the Confederacy to have resided "within the limits of the Confederate States" for 14 years.

Article VII Section 1(2) includes instructions for electing permanent officials after the ratification of the Confederate Constitution:

When five states shall have ratified this Constitution, in the manner before specified, the Congress under the Provisional Constitution, shall prescribe the time for holding the election of President and Vice President; and, for the meeting of the Electoral College; and, for counting the votes, and inaugurating the President.

=== Legislation ===
On May 21, 1861, the Congress of the Confederacy passed "An Act to put in operation the Government under the Permanent Constitution of the Confederate States of America". It includes the following provisions:

Section 1. ... And on [the first Wednesday in November, eighteen hundred and sixty-one] the several states shall elect or appoint Electors for President and Vice President of the Confederate States of America, according to said Constitution, and in the manner prescribed by the laws of the several States made for that purpose; and in states where no such laws may exist, according to the laws heretofore in force in such states for the election or appointment of Electors for President and Vice President of the United States.

Sec. 2. The Electors for President and Vice President shall meet in their respective states on the first Wednesday in December, eighteen hundred and sixty-one, and proceed to vote for President and Vice President, and make out lists, certify the same, and forward the same to the President of the Senate; all as directed by the said Constitution in that behalf.

Sec. 3. The members of the House of Representatives so elected, and the Senators who may be elected by the several states according to the provisions of said Constitution, shall assemble at the seat of government of the Confederate States, on the eighteenth day of February, eighteen hundred and sixty-two; ... and the President of the Senate shall, on the nineteenth day of February, eighteen hundred and sixty-two, open all the certificates; and the votes for President and Vice President shall then be counted, as directed by said Constitution.

Sec. 4. The President of the Confederate States shall be inaugurated on the twenty-second day of February, eighteen hundred and sixty-two.

== General election ==
=== Campaign ===
Davis and Stephens ran without opposition.

=== Results ===
The election effectively confirmed the decision that had been made by the Provisional Confederate Congress earlier in the year.

Davis remained President until May 5, 1865, when the Confederate government was officially dissolved.

Electoral results
Presidential candidate	Party	Home state	Popular vote^{(a)}		Electoral vote^{(b)}	Running mate		
Presidential candidate	Party	Home state	Count	Percentage	Electoral vote^{(b)}	Vice-presidential candidate	Home state	Electoral vote^{(b)}
Jefferson Davis	Nonpartisan	Mississippi	47,057	96.98%	109	Alexander Hamilton Stephens	Georgia	109
Other			1,465	3.02%	—	Other		—
Total			48,522	100%	109			109
Needed to win					55			55

Source (Popular Vote): CSA President - Popular Vote. Our Campaigns. (August 30, 2012).
Source (Electoral Vote): CSA President. Our Campaigns. (August 30, 2012).

Popular vote
Davis	96.98%
Others	3.02%

Electoral vote
Davis	100%

^{(a)} Totals reflect the popular vote in North Carolina only.
^{(b)} Missouri and Kentucky did not participate in this election. Missouri was admitted November 28, 1861, and Kentucky December 10, 1861.

== Electoral College ==
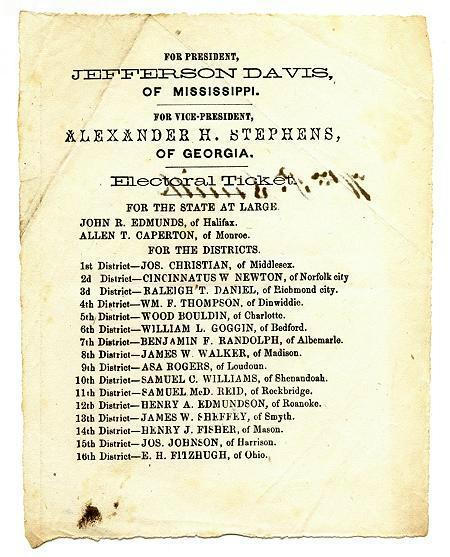
Virginia election ballot, November 6, 1861

The Confederate States Electoral College was the institution that elected the president and vice president for a six-year term without possibility of re-election for the president.

The president and vice president were not elected directly by the voters. Instead, they were elected by electors who were chosen by popular vote on a state-by-state basis, with the exception of South Carolina, where the electors were chosen by the state legislature. This system was established by the Constitution of the Confederate States, in emulation of the United States Constitution. Like the U.S. Constitution, the Confederate Constitution provided that each state would have a number of electors "equal to the whole number of Senators and Representatives to which the State may be entitled in the Congress" (Article II, Section 1).

The Electoral College consisted of 109 electors. The electors (chosen in the November 6 elections) met in their respective states to cast their votes on December 4, 1861 (Confederate law mandated that electors meet on the first Wednesday in December). The Congress met in joint session on February 19, 1862, and certified the result. Davis and Stephens were inaugurated on February 22, 1862.

== Key dates ==
Presidential election	Electoral College vote	Electoral vote tabulated by a joint session of Congress	Inauguration
November 6, 1861	December 4, 1861	February 19, 1862	February 22, 1862

== Official sources ==
Journal of the Congress of the Confederate States of America, 1861–1865 [Volume 5], Journal of the House of Representatives of the First Congress of the Confederate States of America, Second Day—Wednesday, February 19, 1862, page 12 and page 13
