= Vice President of the Confederate States of America =

Second-highest executive officer of the government of the Confederate States of America

Vice President of the Confederate States
- Seal of the Confederate States

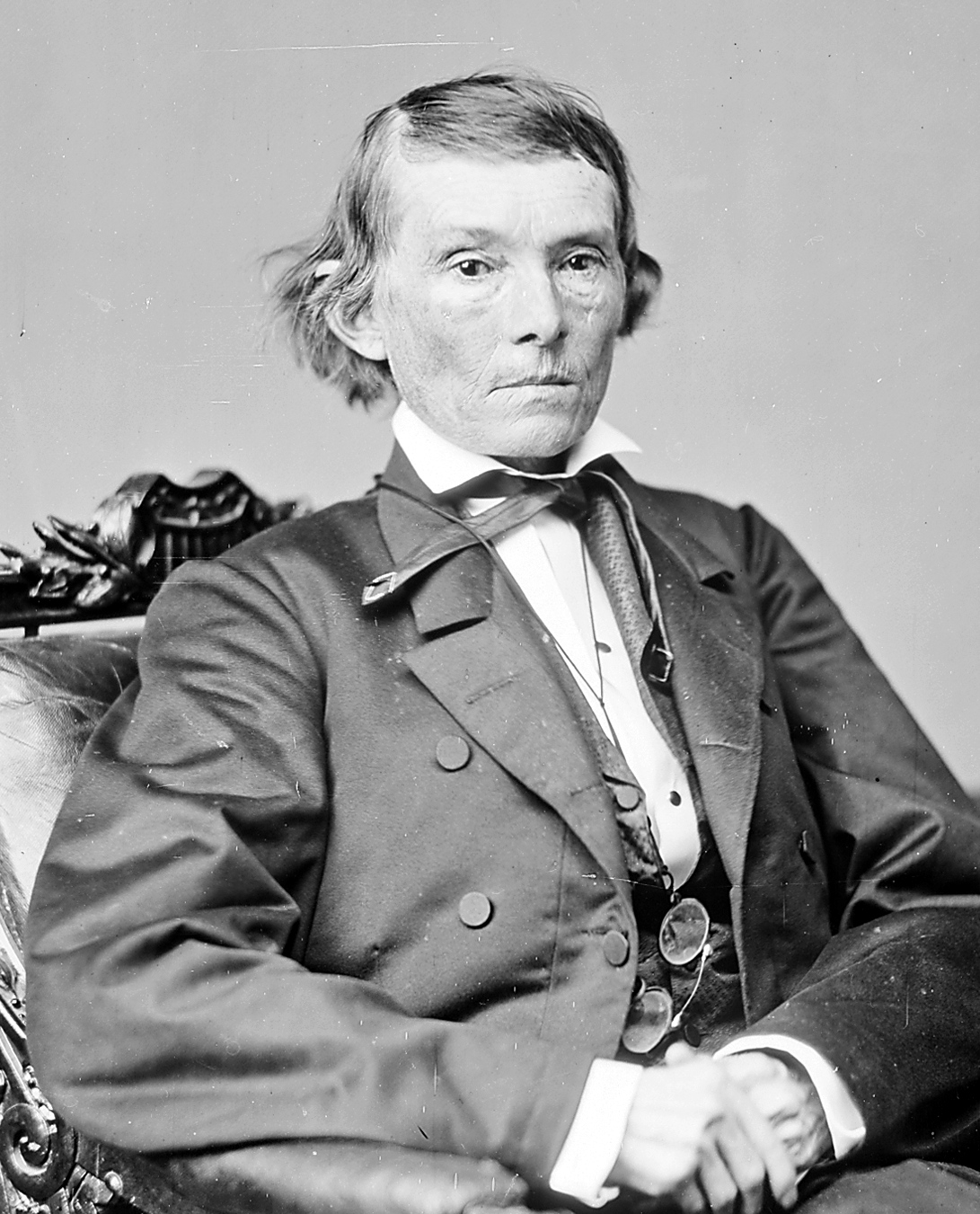
- Alexander H. Stephens
- Style: The Honorable
- Residence: Court End
- Appointer: Electoral College
- Formation: February 18, 1861
- First holder: Alexander H. Stephens
- Final holder: Alexander H. Stephens
- Abolished: May 5, 1865

The vice president of the Confederate States was the second highest executive officer of the government of the Confederate States of America and the deputy to the president of the Confederate States. The office was held by Alexander H. Stephens of Georgia, who served under President Jefferson Davis of Mississippi from February 18, 1861, until the dissolution of the Confederacy on May 5, 1865. Having first been elected by the Provisional Confederate States Congress, both were considered provisional office-holders until they won the presidential election of November 6, 1861 without opposition and inaugurated on February 22, 1862.

== The office ==
According to the Constitution of the Confederate States, the vice president's office was almost entirely identical to that of the vice president of the United States.

The vice president was elected by an electoral college (closely modeled after the U.S. Electoral College) along with the president. Electors had to cast one of their votes for someone not from their State. If no candidate won a majority in the Electoral College, the Confederate Senate would elect the vice president from the top two vote-getters. Like the president, the vice president had to be a natural-born citizen of the Confederacy or a natural-born citizen of the U.S. born prior to December 20, 1860, and a resident in the Confederacy for over 14 years.

The major difference between the U.S. and the C.S. vice presidencies was that the Confederate term in office was six years long. The president was explicitly forbidden from running for a second term by the constitution, but the vice president was not. It was unclear whether or not a vice president, if he succeeded to the presidency, in the middle of a term, could run for a full presidential term afterward.

== Duties ==
The vice president's primary duty was presiding over the Confederate Senate and breaking tied votes, as the U.S. vice president presides and breaks ties in the U.S. Senate. He was also the first person in the line of succession. If the president died, resigned, or was removed from office, the vice president would become the new president for the remainder of his term; this never happened.

During his tenure in office, Stephens grew increasingly distant from Davis and spent less and less time in Richmond, the Confederate capital. He eventually spent much of his time trying, without success, to maintain diplomatic channels with the U.S. and pushed for a negotiated end to the war. He was sent by Davis to represent the Confederate government at the Hampton Roads peace conference.

== List of vice-presidents ==
No.	Portrait	Vice President	State	Term of office	Party	Term	Previous office	President
1		Alexander H. Stephens; February 11, 1812 – March 4, 1883 (aged 71)	Georgia	February 18, 1861 (Note: Stephens was the vice-president under the Provisional Constitution of the Confederate States from February 18, 1861 to February 22, 1862 when his six year term under the permanent constitution began.) – May 5, 1865	Democratic (Note: While organized political parties did not exist in the Confederacy, Stephens was a member of the Democratic Party before and after the American Civil War.)	1 (1861)	U.S. Representative for Georgia's 8th	Jefferson Davis

== See also ==
- Congress of the Confederate States
- Postage stamps and postal history of the Confederate States
- President of the Confederate States of America
- Treatment of slaves in the United States
