= Gravi de pugna =

Forged letter by Augustine of Hippo about just war

Gravi de pugna is a forged letter written in the name of Augustine of Hippo which asserts that the morally superior side is always superior in battle and therefore that wars are proven to be just wars by their military success. The letter was widely accepted as authentic, and reassured soldiers that God was on their side.

== Ideology ==
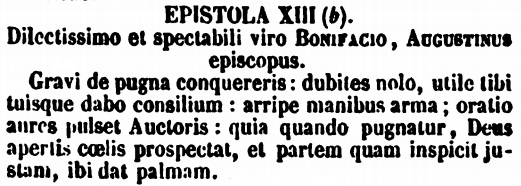
Gravi de pugna, Patrologia Latina 33

"You are concerned with whether you will prevail in battle: I don't wish you to doubt... when you are fighting God will look down from heaven, and discern which side is just and give that side the victory"

— Gravi de pugna, translated by David A. Lenihan.

Gravi de pugna is best known for its simple assertion that God will assure that the morally superior side will win military battles, and conversely, that victory itself validates that the use of force was appropriate. (Note: This is a form of the just-world fallacy.) Udo Heyn claims this was a Germanic notion, (Note: See Trial by combat § Origins, which also ascribes Germanic origins to that practice.) and Phillip Wynn reports that it had long been believed in pagan antiquity by the time of this letter. This understanding was, in fact, utterly rejected by Augustine. Kelly DeVries regards the theology of Gravi de pugna as shallow and considers it to raise problems of theodicy and legitimacy as soon as the first Christian army loses.

Gravi also urges prayer for victory before battle, which was also rejected by Augustine, who found such prayers inappropriate.

== History ==
Gravi de pugna was written in the fifth century. The letter was widely accepted as authentic from its introduction through the medieval era, and was the most frequently cited text in this period on holy war. It was invoked to justify numerous wars, including by Hincmar of Reims, Rabanus Maurus, Sedulius Scottus, Ivo of Chartres, and Bernard of Clairvaux It was also recited at the Siege of Lisbon in 1147 CE. Gravi imbued the Crusaders with confidence that God was on their side, squelching all moral concerns and leading to behavior that did not comply with then-accepted rules of war.

The work lost influence with the renaissance of the 12th century, which developed more sophisticated jurisprudence and moral reasoning, At the same time, Augustine's own opinions on just wars, which had been largely unknown, were studied by the decretists and through them, Aquinas as well. The authenticity of Gravi de Pugna was not conclusively rejected until Erasmus. Although it is regarded by contemporary scholars as "obviously un-Augustinian", it is now widely recognized that Gravi de pugna has inaccurately influenced scholars of Augustine's views on war even up through modern times.

== Published editions ==
- Migne, Jacques Paul (ed.). "Epistle 13 (b)". Patrologia Latina. Vol. 33. col. 1098. "Dilectissimo et spectabili viro Bonifacio, Augustinus episcopus. Gravi de pugna conquereris: dubites nolo, utile tibi tuisque dabo consilium: arripe manibus arma; oratio aures pulset Auctoris: quia quando pugnatur, Deus apertis cœlis prospectat, et partem quam inspicit justam, ibi dat palmam."

== See also ==
- Holmgang
- Gott mit uns
- Trial by combat
- Deo vindice
