= Gott mit uns =

"God with us", slogan used by Germans

Kaiserstandarte (Emperor's standard) of 1871

Gott mit uns ('God [is] with us') is a phrase commonly used in heraldry in Prussia (from 1701) and later by the German military during the periods spanning the German Empire (1871–1918) and Nazi Germany (1933–1945) and also on the belt buckles of the West German police forces until the 1970s.

== Origins ==
Matthew 1:23 refers to the prophecy written in Isaiah 7:14, rendering the name Immanuel (Emmanuel, עִמָּנוּאֵל) as 'God with us':

Biblical Greek: ἰδοὺ ἡ παρθένος ἐν γαστρὶ ἔξει καὶ τέξεται υἱόν, καὶ καλέσουσι τὸ ὄνομα αὐτοῦ Εμμανουήλ, ὅ ἐστι μεθερμηνευόμενον μεθ᾽ ἡμῶν ὁ θεός.

— Matthew 1:23, Westcott and Hort

Behold, a virgin shall be with child, and shall bring forth a son, and they shall call his name Emmanuel, which being interpreted is, God with us.

— Matthew 1:23, King James Version

German: "Siehe, eine Jungfrau wird schwanger sein und einen Sohn gebären, und sie werden seinen Namen Immanuel heißen", das ist verdolmetscht: Gott mit uns.

— Matthew 1:23, Luther Bible

== Usage ==
=== Roman Empire ===
Nobiscum Deus in Latin, Μεθ’ ἡμῶν ὁ Θεός (Meth hēmō̂n ho Theós) in Ancient Greek, was a battle cry of the later Roman Empire and of the Byzantine Empire.

=== Germany ===
It was used for the first time in Germany by the Teutonic Order.

In the 17th century, the phrase Gott mit uns was used as a 'field word', a means of recognition akin to a password, by the army of Gustavus Adolphus at the battles of Breitenfeld, Lützen and Wittstock in the Thirty Years' War.

In 1701, Frederick I of Prussia changed his coat of arms as Prince-Elector of Brandenburg. The electoral scepter had its own shield under the electoral cap. Below, the motto Gott mit uns appeared on the pedestal. The Prussian Order of the Crown was Prussia's lowest ranking order of chivalry, and was instituted in 1861. The obverse gilt central disc bore the crown of Prussia, surrounded by a blue enamel ring bearing the motto of the German Empire Gott mit uns.

At the time of the completion of German unification in 1871, the imperial standard bore the motto Gott mit uns on the arms of an Iron Cross. Imperial German three- and five-mark silver and 20 mark gold coins had Gott mit uns inscribed on their edge.

German soldiers had Gott mit uns inscribed on their belt buckles in the First World War. The slogan entered the mindset on both sides; in 1916 a cartoon was printed in the New-York Tribune captioned "Gott Mit Uns!", showing "a German officer in spiked helmet holding a smoking revolver as he stood over the bleeding form of a nurse. It symbolized the rising popular demand that the United States shed its neutrality".

In June 1920, George Grosz produced a lithographic collection in three editions entitled Gott mit uns. A satire on German society and the counter-revolution, the collection was swiftly banned. Grosz was charged with insulting the Reichswehr, which resulted in a 300 Papiermark fine and the destruction of the collection.

During the Second World War, Nazi Germany's Wehrmacht soldiers wore this slogan on their belt buckles. as opposed to members of the Waffen-SS, who wore the motto Meine Ehre heißt Treue ('My honour is loyalty'). After the war, the Bundeswehr abandoned the motto Gott mit uns, but the West German police continued to use it until the 1970s. For ideological reasons, this motto was not used in East Germany.

Since 1962, the Bundeswehr soldiers wear on their belt buckles the motto Einigkeit und Recht und Freiheit ('Unity and Justice and Freedom'), which is the first line of the third stanza of the West German national anthem, the only one actually sung (now the only stanza of the national anthem of unified Germany).

==== Gallery ====
Coat of arms of Frederick I of Prussia

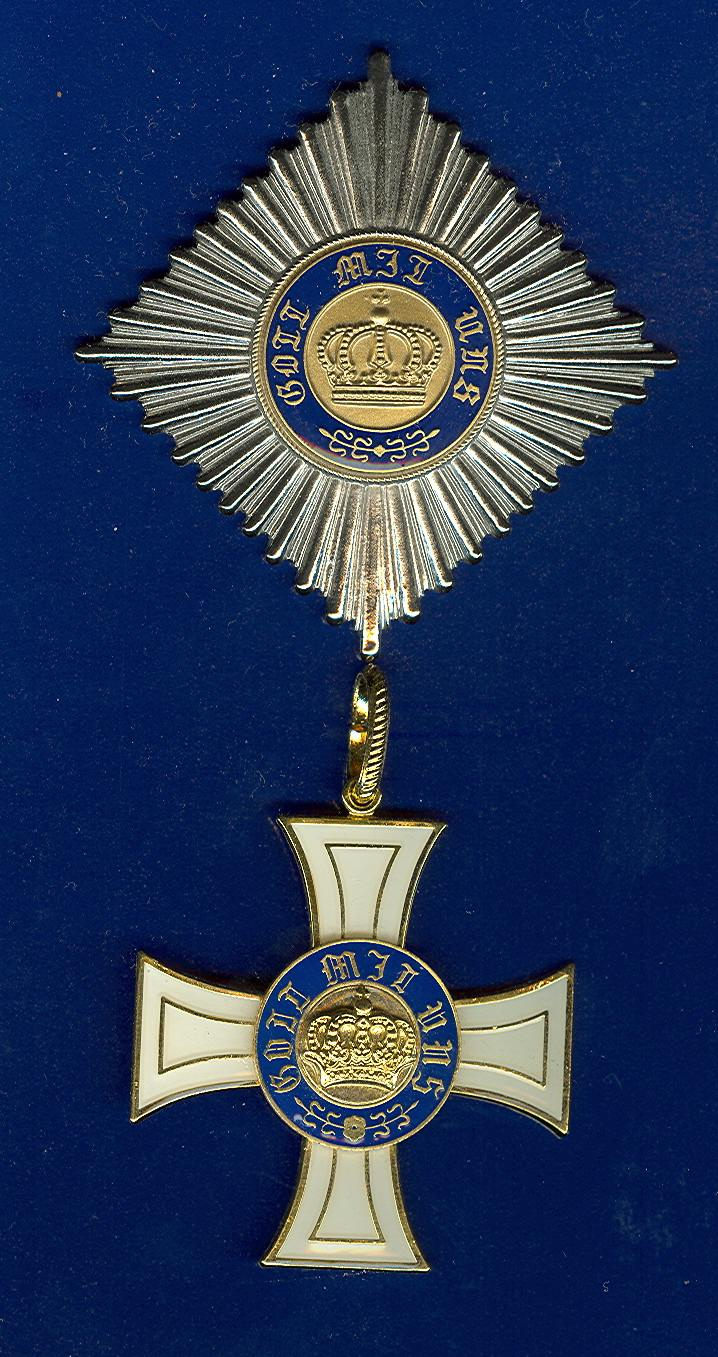
Prussian Order of the Crown

German arms of 1871 (note banners)

Coat of arms of the State of Prussia (1933–1935)

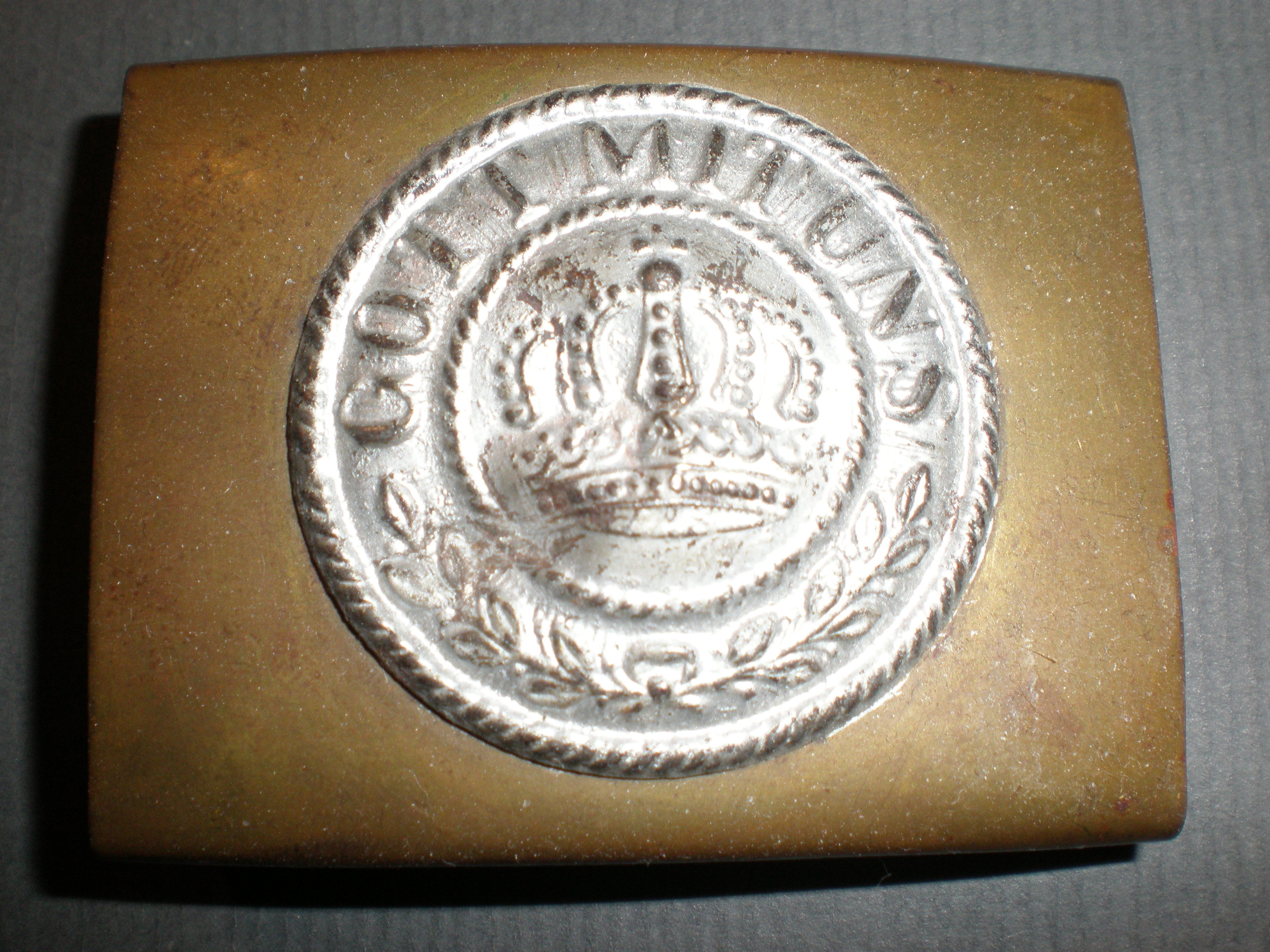
World War I Prussian enlisted belt buckle

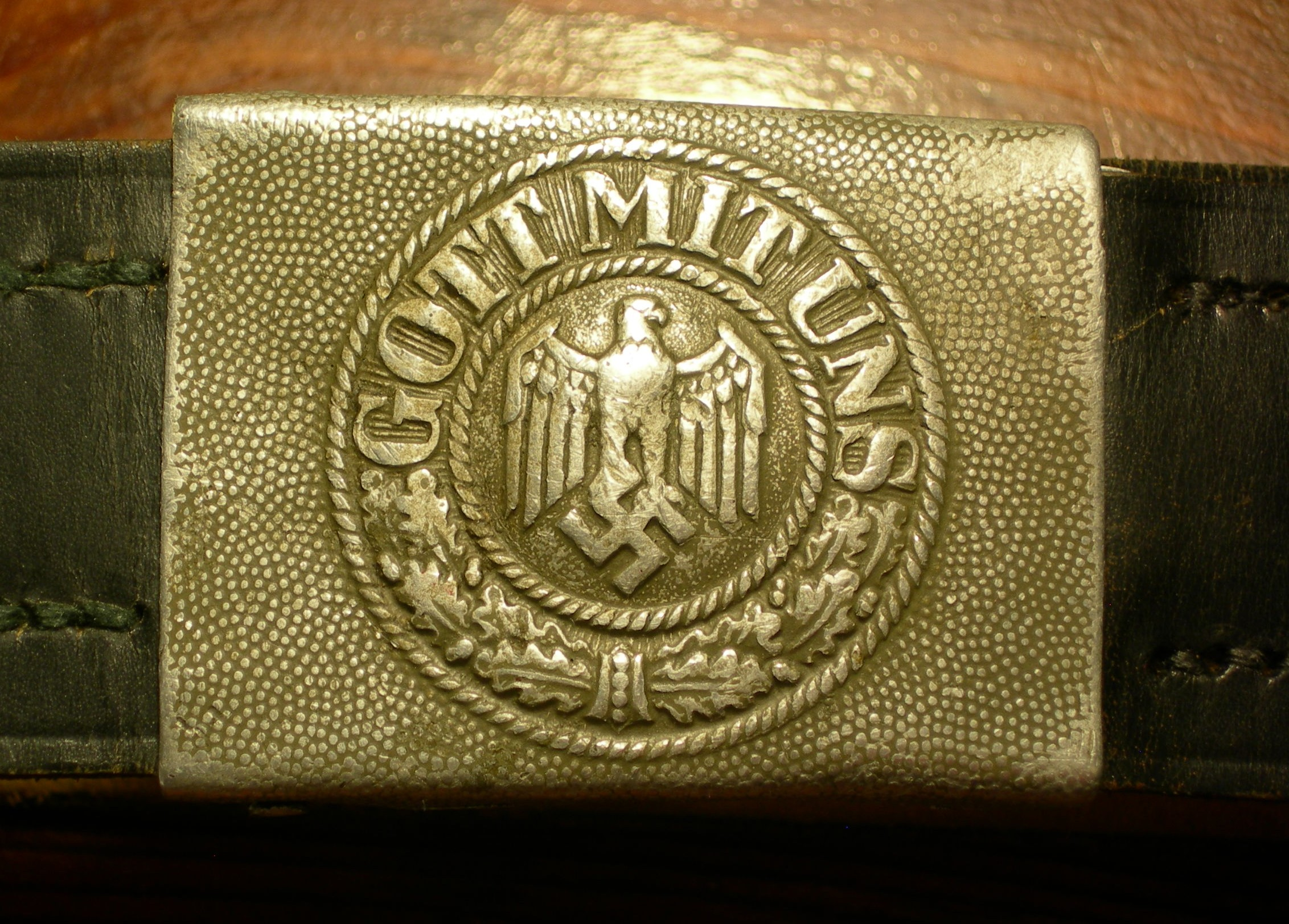
World War II Wehrmacht belt buckle

== See also ==
- In God We Trust
- Dieu et mon droit
- God zij met ons
- Gravi de pugna
- Deo vindice
- Takbir
