= Deo vindice =

National motto of the Confederate States of America

The motto appears on the margin beneath the device of the Seal of the Confederate States.

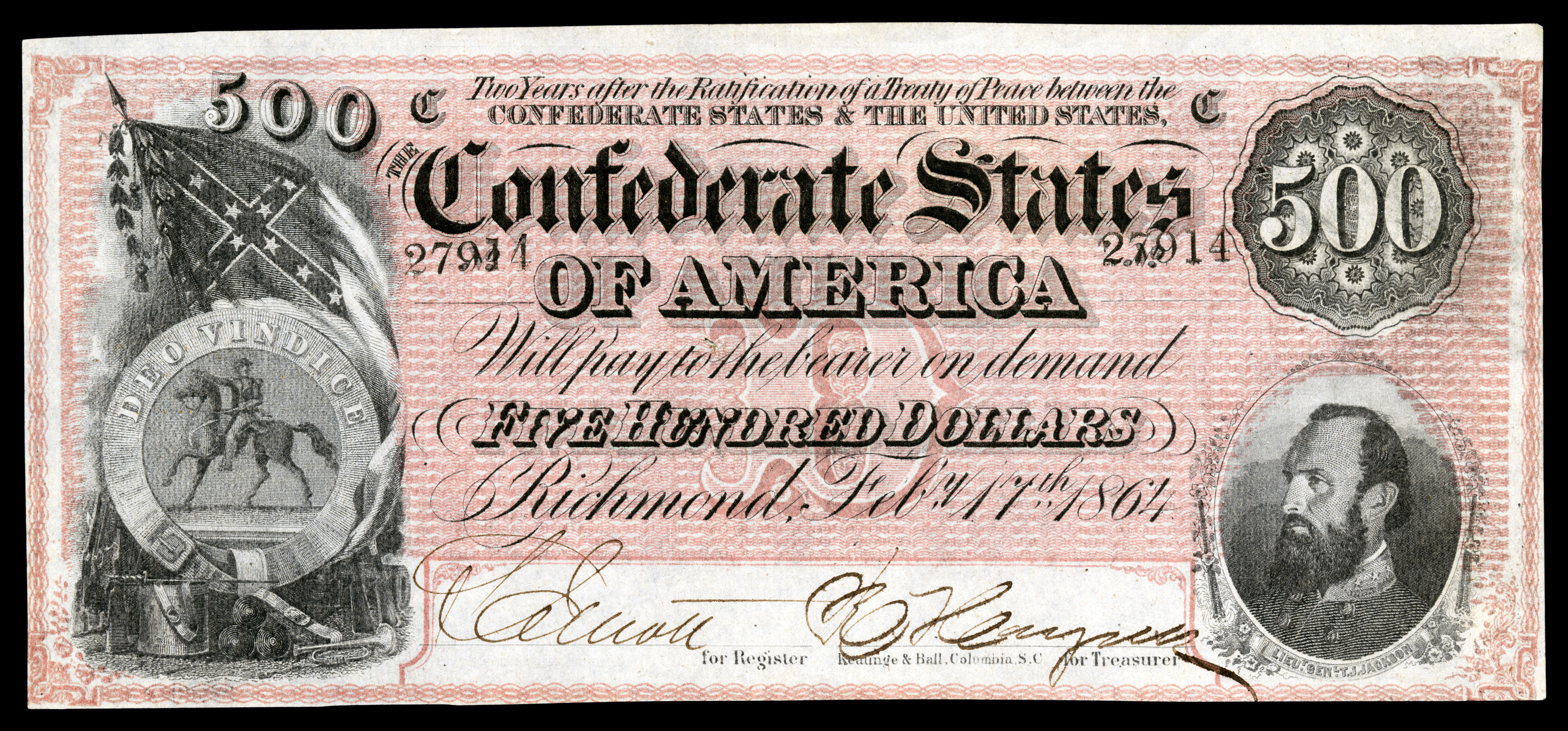
Deo vindice on the 1864 CS$500 banknote

Deo vindice (Latin for "(With) God (as our) defender/protector") (Note: The exact translation is open to some interpretation.) was the national motto of the Confederate States of America. It appears on the margin beneath the device of the Seal of the Confederate States. Never codified by law, Deo vindice was considered the de facto motto of the Confederate States from April 30, 1863, when the Confederate States Congress passed an act (Joint Resolution No. 4), establishing a Seal of the Confederate States. The national motto was first used publicly in 1864.

== See also ==
- In God We Trust
- Gott mit uns
- Dieu et mon droit
- Ex unitate vires
- God zij met ons
- Gravi de pugna
- List of national mottos
- Seal of the Confederate States of America
