= Seal of the Confederate States =

- Armiger: Confederate States of America
- Adopted: April 30, 1863
- Motto: Latin: Deo vindice
- Use: On the national currency in 1864

The Seal of the Confederate States was used to authenticate certain documents issued by the federal government of the Confederate States of America. The phrase is used both for the physical seal itself (which was kept by the Confederate Secretary of State), and more generally for the design impressed upon it. On May 20, 1863, C.S. Secretary of State Judah P. Benjamin instructed James Mason to arrange for its manufacture in London. The seal was first used publicly in 1864.

== Design ==
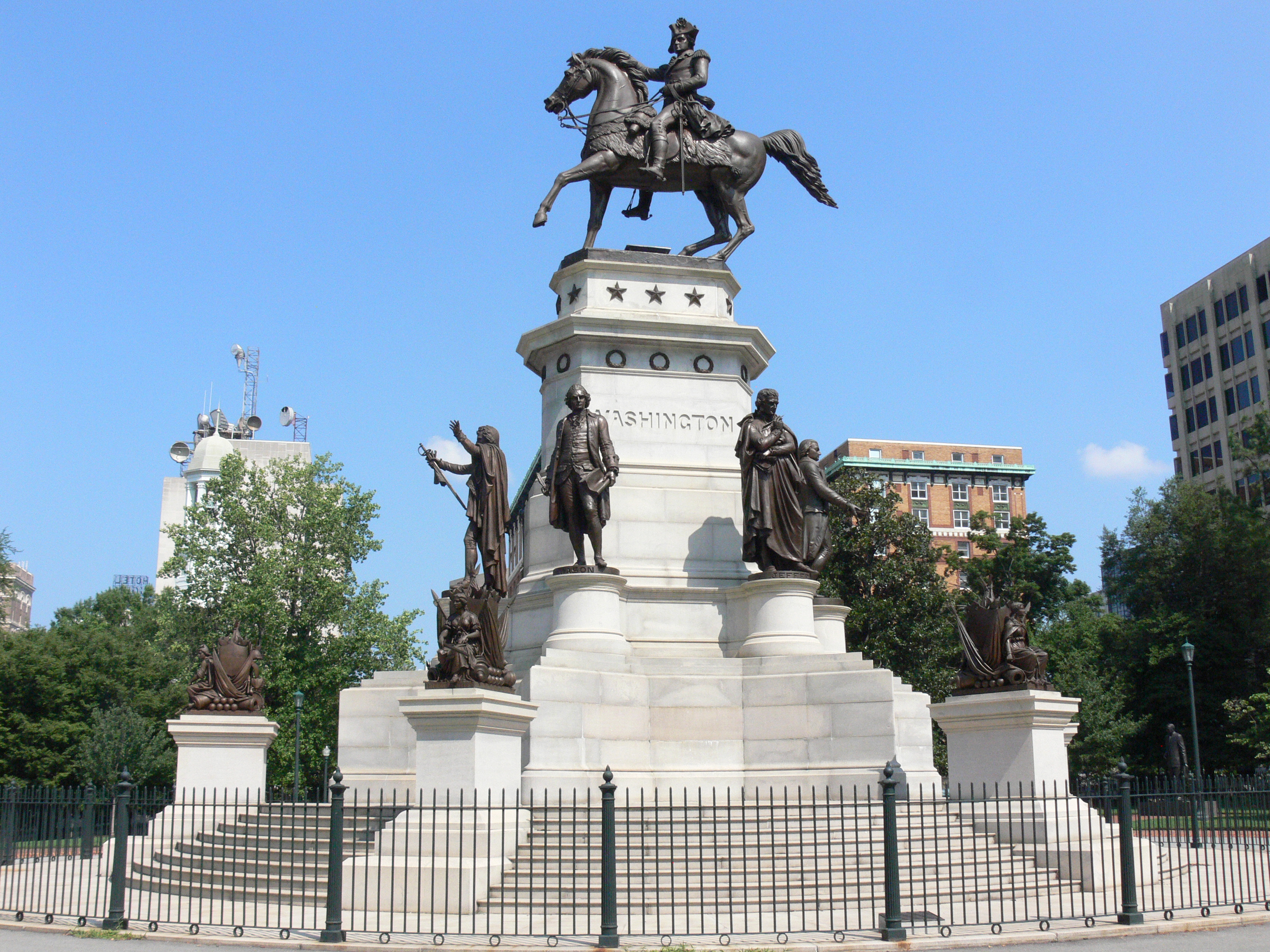
Statue of Washington at Richmond

The Seal of the Confederate States prominently features the Statue of Washington in the capitol square at Richmond. In the seal, George Washington is surrounded with a wreath made of some of the main agricultural products of the Confederacy: wheat, corn, tobacco, cotton, rice, and sugar cane. The top margin features the words 'The Confederate States of America: 22 February 1862'. This date reflects the establishment of the federal government under the new Confederate Constitution when Jefferson Davis was inaugurated as the president of the Confederate States on Washington's birthday (February 22), 1862, in the capital square at Richmond, then the Confederacy's capitol. The bottom margin contains the national motto, Deo vindice, meaning '(With) God (as) our defender/protector'. (Note: The translation is open to some interpretation.) Confederate Senator Thomas Semmes, in proposing the motto, took pains to stress that both the provisional and the permanent Confederate constitution "had deviated in the most emphatic manner from the spirit that presided over the construction of the Constitution of the United States, which is silent on the subject of the Deity."

== History ==
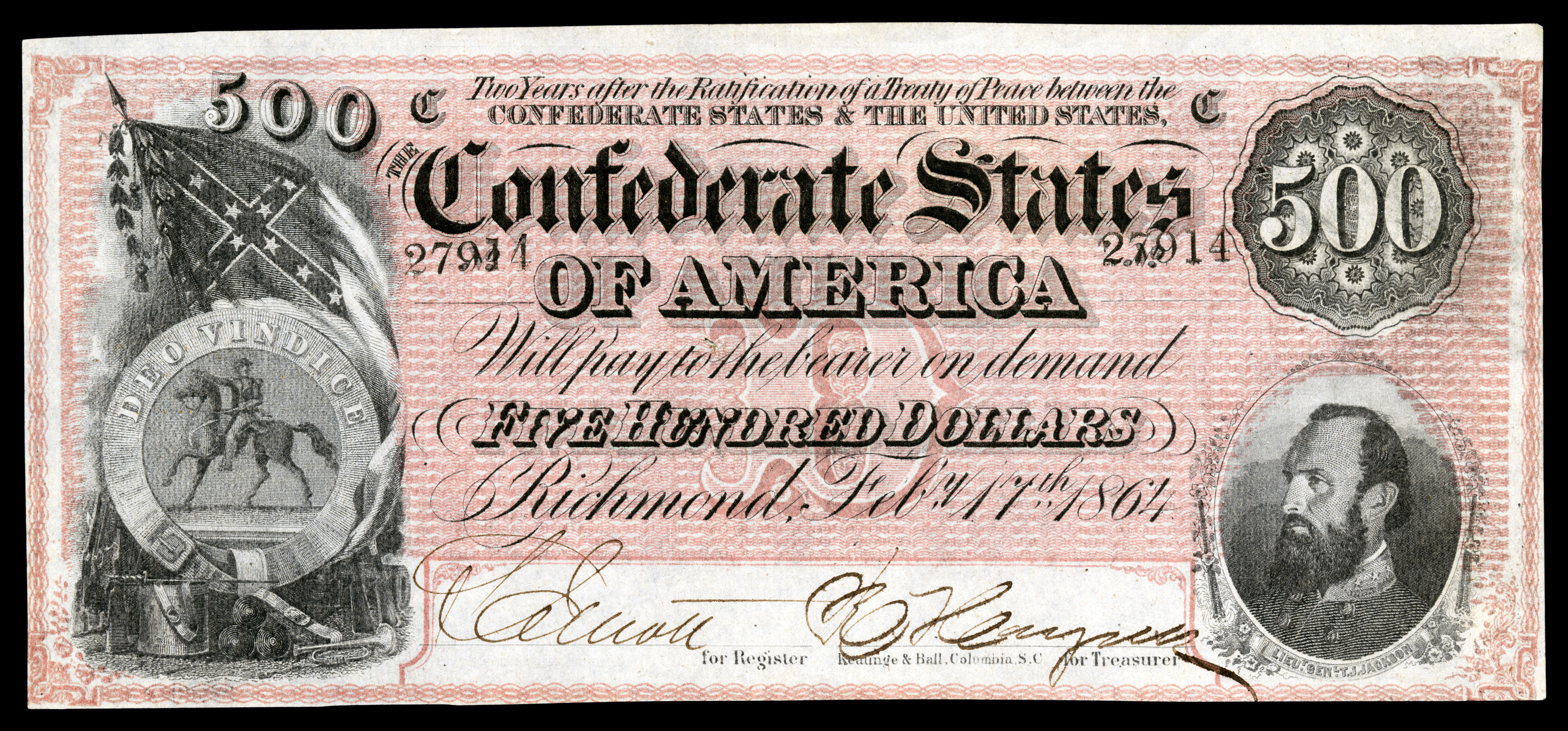
Seal on a 1864 CS$500 banknote

According to the Richmond Whig of September 25, 1862, a design that passed the Confederate Senate represented in the foreground a Confederate soldier, in position to charge bayonet; in the middle distance, a woman with a child in front of a church, both with hands uplifted in the attitude of prayer; for a background, a homestead in the plain, with mountains in the distance beneath the noonday sun; the whole surrounded by a wreath composed of the stalks of sugarcane, rice, cotton, and tobacco plants, the margin inscribed with the words 'Seal of the Confederate States of America' above, and 'Our Homes and Constitutions' beneath. This seal was never used.

The final design was approved on April 30, 1863, and a set of embossing dies ordered from London engraver Joseph Wyon. The seal was first used publicly in 1864. The dies eventually reached Richmond before the end of the war. However, due to the risks of running the Union blockade, the accompanying embossing press was only shipped as far as Bermuda. The dies (crafted in silver) were thus unlikely to ever have been used in any official capacity. Both sets of artifacts initially passed through private ownership before ultimately entering museum collections. The seal is kept at Richmond's American Civil War Museum. The press is in the BNT Museum at the Globe Hotel, St. George's.

== Gallery ==
Images of the Seal of the Confederate States

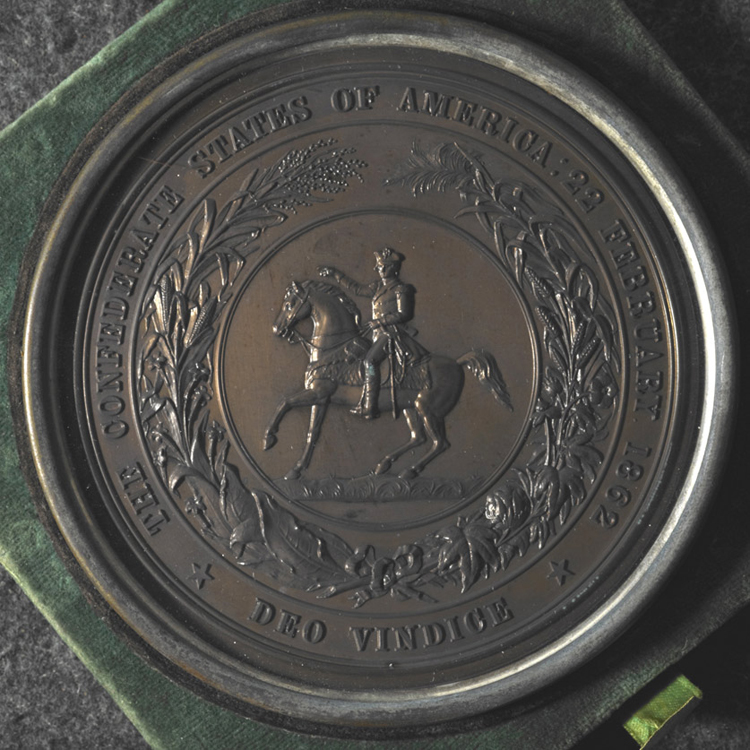
Electrotype

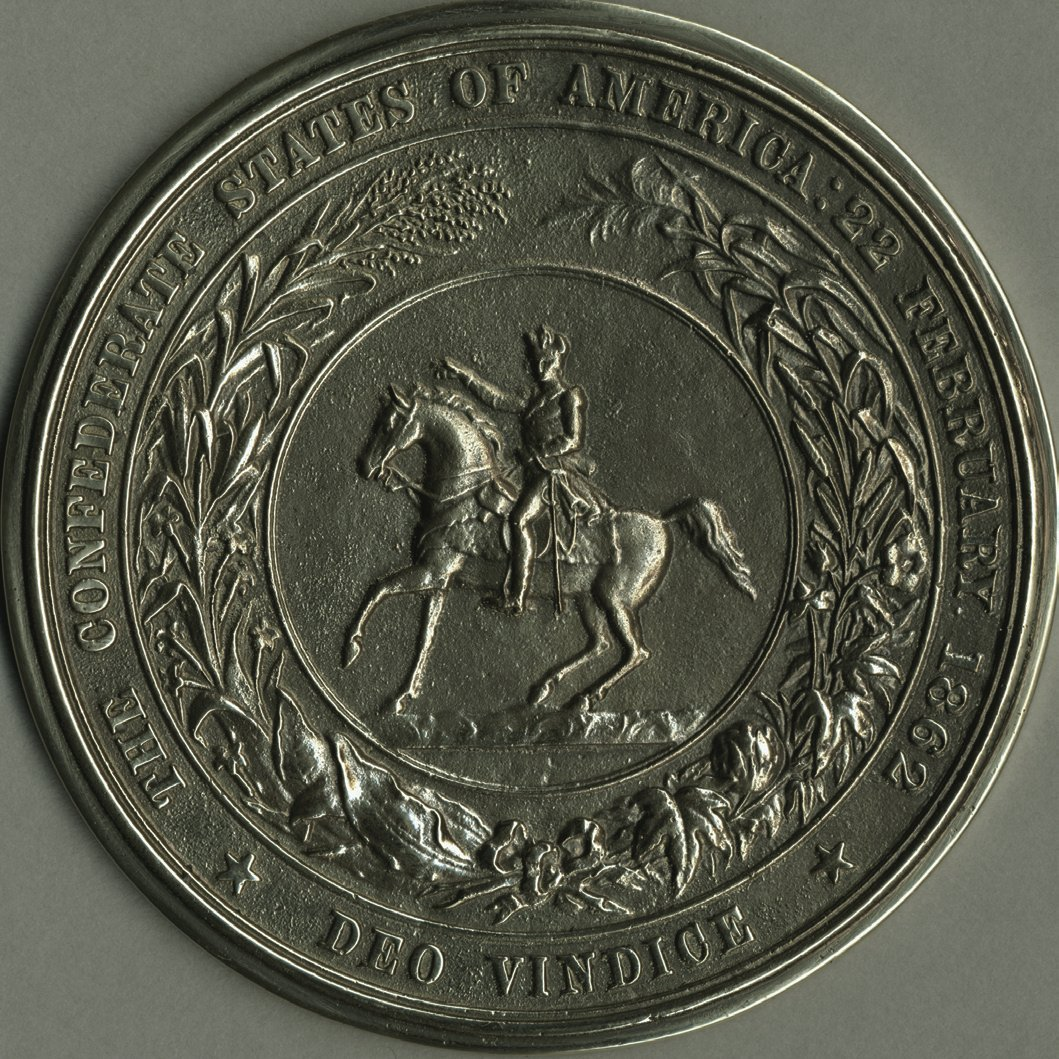
Replica

== See also ==
- Flag of the Confederate States
- National symbols of the Confederate States
