= Robert M. T. Hunter =

American lawyer and politician (1809–1887)

Robert Hunter
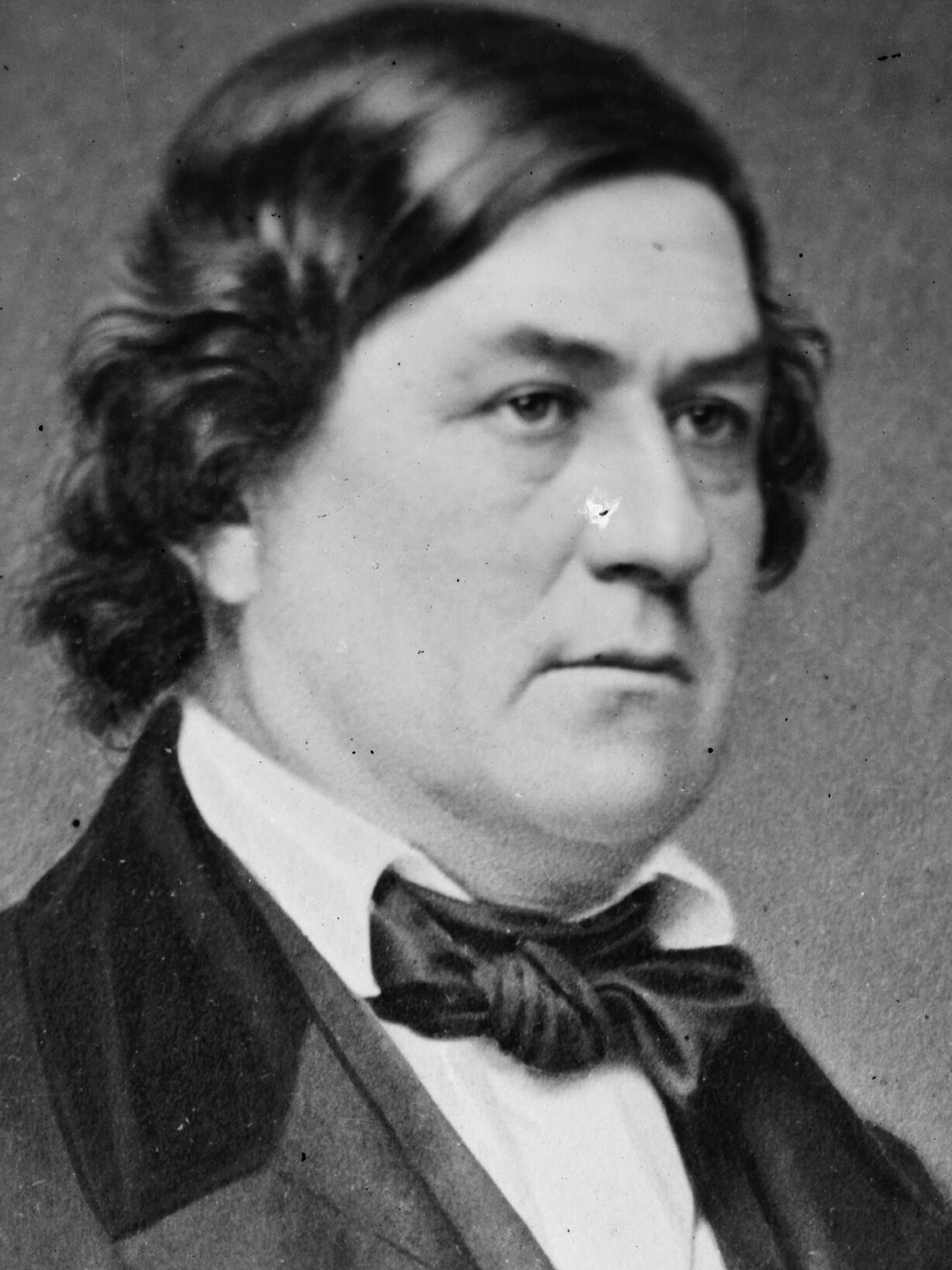

President pro tempore of the Confederate States Senate
- In office February 18, 1862 – May 10, 1865
- Preceded by: Howell Cobb (President of the Provisional Congress)
- Succeeded by: Position abolished

Confederate States Senator from Virginia
- In office February 18, 1862 – May 10, 1865
- Preceded by: Constituency established
- Succeeded by: Constituency abolished

2nd Confederate States Secretary of State
- In office July 25, 1861 – February 18, 1862
- President: Jefferson Davis
- Preceded by: Robert Toombs
- Succeeded by: William Browne (Acting)

United States Senator from Virginia
- In office March 4, 1847 – March 28, 1861
- Preceded by: William Archer
- Succeeded by: John Carlile

14th Speaker of the United States House of Representatives
- In office December 16, 1839 (Note: multi-ballot election; voting lasted two days (The total vacancy was over eight months; Congress simply did not work until December.)) – March 4, 1841
- Preceded by: James Polk
- Succeeded by: John White

Member of the U.S. House of Representatives from Virginia's 8th district
- In office March 4, 1845 – March 3, 1847
- Preceded by: Willoughby Newton
- Succeeded by: Richard L. T. Beale

Member of the U.S. House of Representatives from Virginia's 9th district
- In office March 4, 1837 – March 3, 1843
- Preceded by: John Roane
- Succeeded by: Samuel Chilton

Member of the Virginia House of Delegates from Essex County
- In office December 1, 1834 – March 4, 1837
- Preceded by: Richard Baylor
- Succeeded by: George Lorimer

Personal details
- Born: Robert Mercer Taliaferro Hunter; April 21, 1809 Loretto, Virginia, U.S.
- Died: July 18, 1887 (aged 78) Lloyds, Virginia, U.S.
- Party: Whig (1837–1841); Democratic (1844–1887)
- Spouse: Mary Dandridge
- Education: University of Virginia (BA); Winchester Law School

Robert Mercer Taliaferro Hunter (April 21, 1809 – July 18, 1887) was an American lawyer, politician and planter. He was a U.S. representative (1837–1843, 1845–1847), speaker of the House (1839–1841), and U.S. senator (1847–1861). During the American Civil War, Hunter became the Confederate States Secretary of State (1861–1862) and then a Confederate senator (1862–1865) and critic of President Jefferson Davis. After the war, Hunter failed to win re-election to the U.S. Senate, but did serve as the treasurer of Virginia (1874–1880) before retiring to his farm. After fellow Democrat Grover Cleveland was elected President of the United States in 1884, Hunter became the customs collector for the port of Tappahannock until his death.

== Early life and education ==
Born at the "Mount Pleasant" plantation near Loretto, Essex County, Virginia, to James Hunter (1774–1826) and his wife Maria (Garnett) Hunter (1777–1811), R.M.T. Hunter was descended from the First Families of Virginia. His mother's father, Muscoe Garnett was one of the county's largest landowners, her brother James M. Garnett was the U.S. congressman representing the area (and her other brother Robert S. Garnett would be within a decade). However, Maria Hunter died shortly after giving birth to William Garnett Hunter (1811–1829), when Robert M. T. Hunter was two years old, and shortly after one of his slightly elder brothers, also William Hunter, died at age 5. Educated first by private tutors, R. M. T. Hunter entered the University of Virginia when he was 17, shortly after his father's death, and became one of its first graduates. While a student, Hunter became a member of the Jefferson Literary and Debating Society, then studied law at the Winchester Law School.

== Planter ==
Several generations of Hunter's family owned a considerable number of slaves, most used to farm their plantations. In 1830, R.M.T. Hunter owned 72 slaves (44 males and 26 females), and his household consisted of two white males (presumably him and an overseer). A decade later, following his marriage, R. M. T. Hunter's household included himself, two young white males (presumably one his eldest son) and five white females, as well as 83 slaves. (Note: The 1840 census for Essex County Virginia mislabels him as RWS Hunter, and used a checkbox method abandoned in later censuses. His household in 1840 included 25 persons employed in agriculture, 5 persons employed in manufacture and trade, and one professional person (presumably himself). Hunter's slaves in that 1840 census included 13 boys and 9 girls under 10 years, 9 males and 12 females aged 10 to 23, 4 males and 4 females aged 24 through 35, 14 males and 8 females aged 36 through 54, and 5 males and 5 females aged55 or above, The corresponding state census is not available online.) In 1850, R. M. T. Hunter of Essex County, Virginia, owned at least 100 slaves. (Note: The initial census page listing R.M.T. Hunter as owner includes 18 males aged 35 to 70 years and 5 females aged between 45 and 50 years old, although following page lists children in the opposite chronological order and the crossed-out slaveowner's name at the top of the next several pages is Richard Boyton (who owned more than 300 slaves in Essex County). The rest of Hunter's slaves are on the previous page with a number "50" but include 18 females between 35 and 15 years old (all at five-year intervals), 10 8-year-old female children, 5 5-year-old female children, and a two-year-old, one-year-old and four two-month female children, in addition to 5 two-month-old boys, a four-year-old, 5 five-year-old boys, 9 ten-year-old boys and 5 15-year-old boys and ten 25-year-old men.) In the 1860 U.S. federal census for Essex County, Virginia, U.S. Senator Hunter owned real estate worth $80,890 and personal property (including slaves) worth $92,800. The federal lists of slaves owned by R. M. T. Hunter nearly fill the majority of two pages (more than 120 persons). (Note: One page lists 65 slaves ranging from a 52-year-old male and 62-year-old female, to children and even infants; the following page continued by enumerating another 61 slaves he owned, ranging from a 62-year-old male and 65-year-old female to two infants. Although the census for Fredericksburg in neighboring Spotsylvania County shows another six slaves owned by "Taliaferro Hunter", such was another man, who soon enlisted in the Confederate army.)

== Political career ==
In 1830, Hunter was admitted to the Virginia bar. In 1834, he was elected to represent Essex County in the Virginia House of Delegates, succeeding Richard Baylor. R. M. T. Hunter won re-election in 1834 and 1836, but resigned upon winning election to the U.S. Congress as discussed next.

In 1836, Hunter was elected U.S. Representative as a States Rights Whig. He was re-elected in 1838, and became Speaker of the United States House of Representatives – the youngest person ever to hold that office. He was re-elected again in 1840, but was not chosen Speaker. In 1842 he was defeated for re-election, but returned in 1844. Hunter favored annexing Texas and compromise on the Oregon question (opposing the Wilmot Proviso), and led efforts to retrocede the City of Alexandria back to Virginia (removing it from the District of Columbia). After losing the 1842 election, Hunter changed parties, becoming a Democrat. In 1845, he again took the oath of office as an elected Congressman, and supported the Tariff of 1846.

In 1846, the Virginia General Assembly elected Hunter U.S. Senator. He assumed office in 1847 and won re-election in 1852 and 1858. Hunter continued to support slavery and its extension: favoring extending the Missouri Compromise line to the Pacific Ocean, opposing abolishing the slave trade in the District of Columbia as well as any interference with its operation in any state or territory, and supported the Fugitive Slave Act of 1850. Senator Hunter delivered an address in Richmond supporting states' rights in 1852, and in the 1857–58 congressional session advocated admitting Kansas under the pro-slavery Lecompton constitution.

In the Senate, Hunter became chairman of the Committee on Finance in 1850. He is credited with bringing about a reduction of the quantity of silver in small silver denominations, helping push forward Senate Bill No. 271 which would eventually become the Coinage Act of 1853. Hunter also drafted and sponsored the Tariff of 1857 (which lowered duties) and creation of the bonded-warehouse system, although federal revenues were thereby reduced. He also advocated civil service reform.

In January 1860, Hunter delivered a speech in favor of slavery and the right of slaveholders to carry their slaves into the territories. At the first session of the 1860 Democratic National Convention in Charleston, South Carolina, Hunter was a contender for the presidential nomination, but received little support except from the Virginia delegation. On the first eight ballots, he was a very distant second to the leader, Stephen A. Douglas, and was third on the remaining 49 ballots. When the convention reconvened in Baltimore, most Southerners withdrew, including Hunter, and Douglas won the party's nomination.

Hunter did not regard Lincoln's election as being of itself sufficient cause for secession. On January 11, 1861, he proposed an elaborate but impracticable scheme to adjust differences between the North and the South. When this and several other similar efforts failed, Hunter quietly urged his own state to pass the ordinance of secession in April 1861. He was expelled from the Senate for supporting secession. One scheme proposed him as president of the new Confederate government, with fellow former U.S. Senator Jefferson Davis as commander of the Confederate States Army. Voters in parts of Virginia that had not seceded elected Unionist John S. Carlile to fill the rest of Hunter's term.

== American Civil War ==
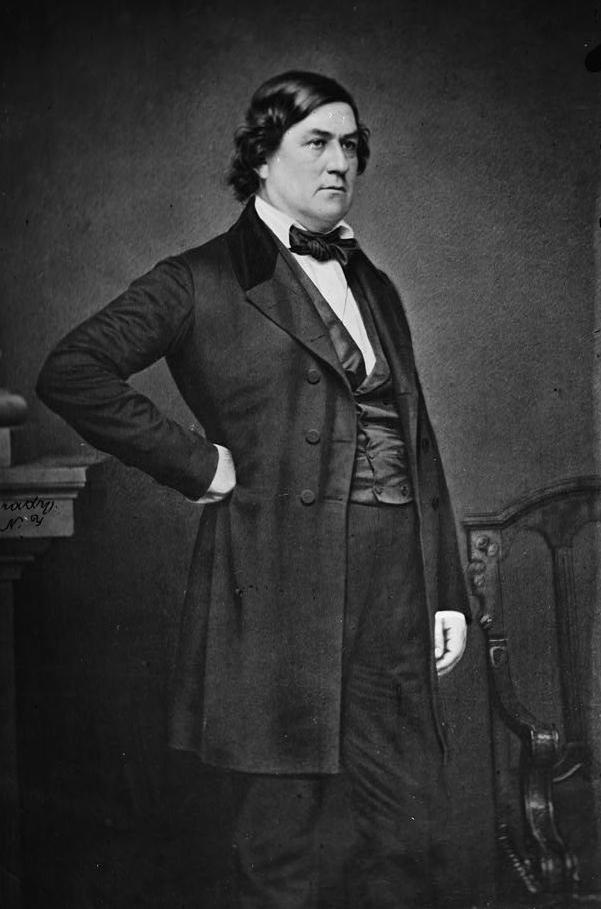
Robert Mercer Taliaferro Hunter

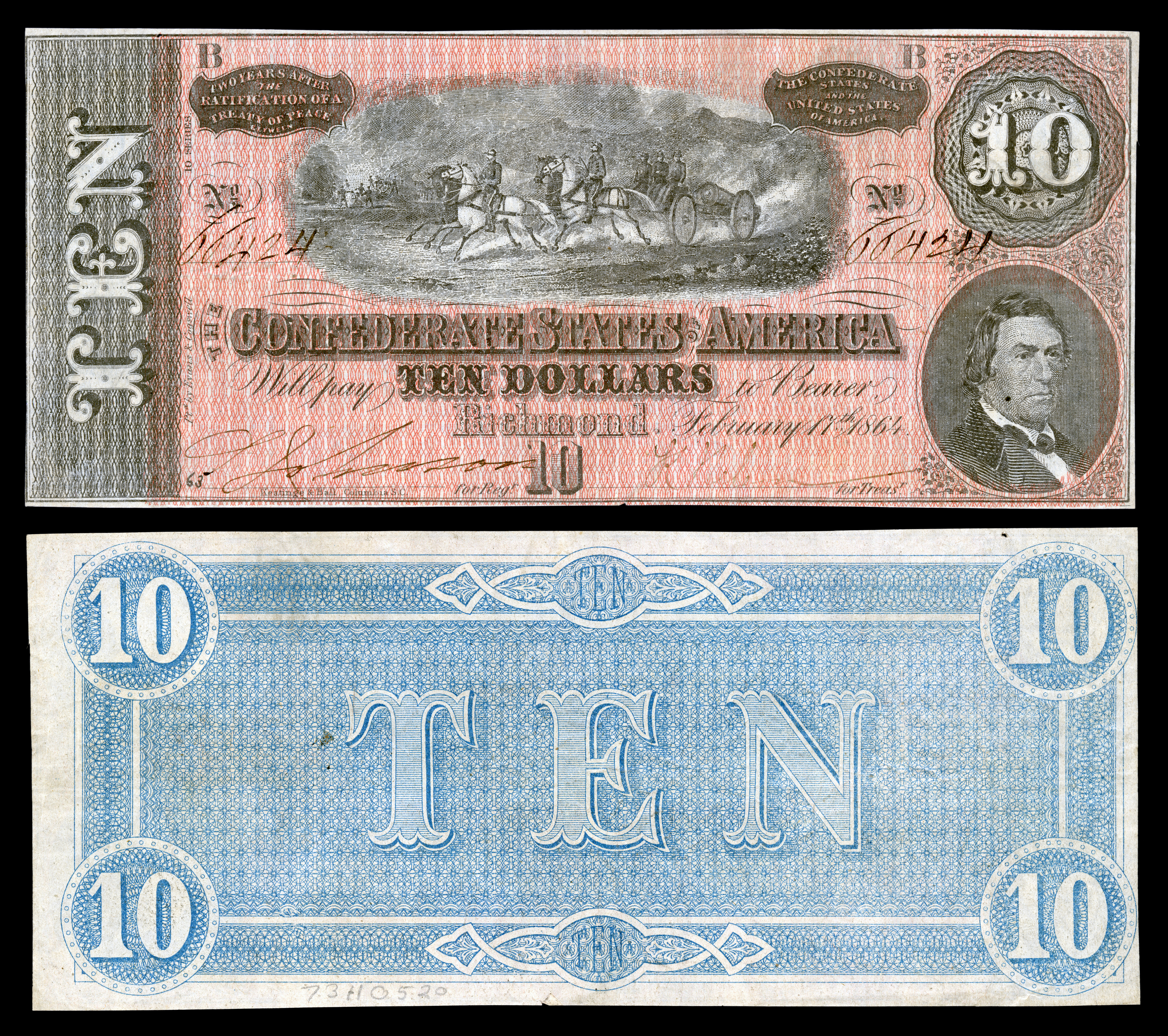
1864 CSA $10 banknote depicting R.M.T. Hunter.

In July 1861, Confederate President Jefferson Davis appointed Hunter the Confederate States secretary of state. He resigned on February 18, 1862, after his election as a Confederate senator. Hunter served in the Confederate Senate in Richmond, Virginia, until the war's end, and was at times President pro tem. His portrait appeared on the Confederate $10 bill.

As a Confederate senator, Hunter became an often caustic critic of Confederate President Davis. Despite this friction, Davis appointed Hunter as one of three commissioners sent to attempt peace negotiations in February 1865. Hunter met with President Abraham Lincoln and Secretary of State William H. Seward at the Hampton Roads Conference. However, after Lincoln refused to acknowledge the Confederacy's independence, Senator Hunter chaired a war meeting in Richmond where Confederates vowed they would never lay down their arms before achieving independence. Following Lee's surrender, President Lincoln summoned Hunter to confer regarding Virginia's restoration to the Union.

Many of Hunter's Garnett relatives became Confederate military officers, and his cousin Judge Muscoe Garnett (1808–1880) commanded the Home Guard in Essex County. Hunter's first cousins (through his mother) were career U.S. Army officers who became Confederate generals Robert S. Garnett and Richard B. Garnett, both of whom died in the conflict. His son James D. Hunter enlisted as a private in Company F, 9th Virginia Cavalry, which was organized in December 1861 with Lt. Garnett among its officers, and which was initially assigned to protect the Rappahannock River as well as the Rappahannock river port cities of Falmouth and Fredericksburg. James D. Hunter served only months before being furloughed on account of sickness in July 1862, but did participate in raids under Gen. J.E.B. Stuart and Capt. William Latane (who became a Confederate martyr as the only casualty of Stuart's vaunted ride around Union troops) and in General Lee's Seven Day offensive which ended the Union Peninsular Campaign. While his eldest son R.M.T. Hunter Jr. died early in the war of disease, his second son, Robert D. Hunter, served as a staff officer in the Army of Northern Virginia and as an engineer.

When some suggested late in the war that their slaves could be armed and serve in the Confederate Army to win their freedom, Senator R.M.T. Hunter vehemently opposed the proposal with a long speech against it, but after the Virginia legislature passed a resolution to the contrary, voted as instructed but with an emphatic protest.

== Later years ==
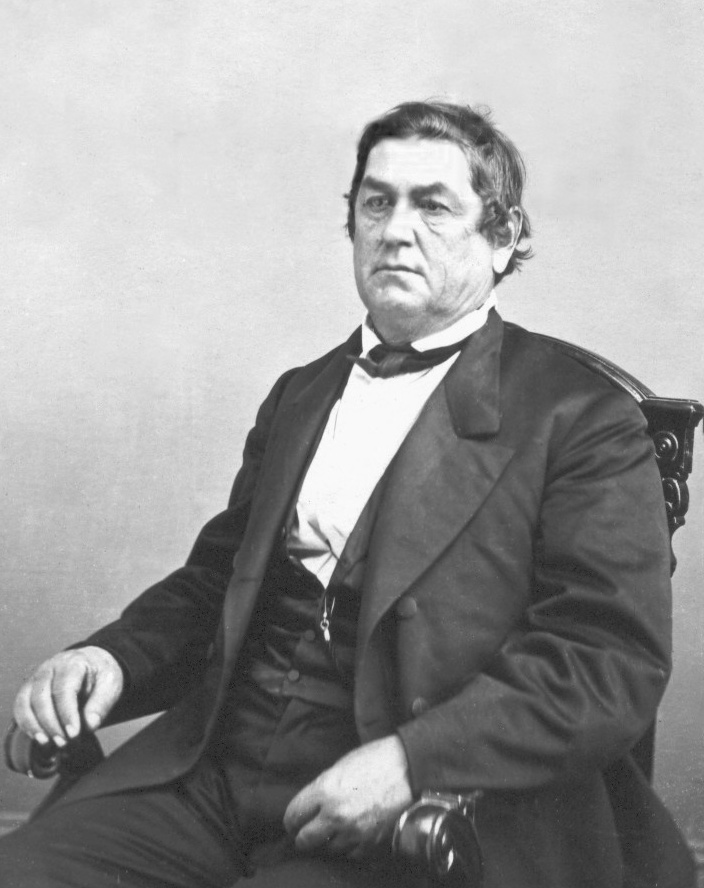
Hunter in later life

In 1867, President Andrew Johnson pardoned Hunter for his activities supporting the Confederate States. He unsuccessfully ran to become U.S. Senator again in 1874, to succeed Unionist Republican John F. Lewis. However, Confederate veteran Robert E. Withers of the Conservative Party won. After that loss, Hunter accepted an appointment as the Treasurer of Virginia, serving from 1874 to 1880, when he returned to his farm. Hunter also published Origin of the Late War, about the causes of the Civil War. From 1885 until his death, he was customs collector of the Port of Tappahannock, Virginia, near his home.

He died near Lloyds, Virginia, in 1887, and was buried at the Garnett family burial ground in Loretto in Essex County.

== Personal life ==
He married Mary Evelina Dandridge (1817–1893) on October 4, 1836, in Jefferson County (then in Virginia, but which became West Virginia during the American Civil War). They had sons Robert Mercer Taliaferro Hunter Jr. (1839–1861), James Dandridge Hunter (1844–1892), Philip Stephen Hunter (1848–1919) and Muscoe Russell Garnett Hunter (1850–1865). Their daughters (educated and unmarried) were Martha Taliaferro Hunter (1841–1909), Sarah Stephena Hunter (1846–1865), Annie Buchanan Hunter (1852–1853) and Mary Evelina Hunter 1854–1881). In 1860 and later censuses, R. M. T. Hunter's unmarried sisters Martha Fenton Hunter (1800–1866) and Jane Swann Hunter (1804–1880) and half-sister Sara (Sully) Hunter (1822–1874) also lived on the family plantation.

== Legacy ==
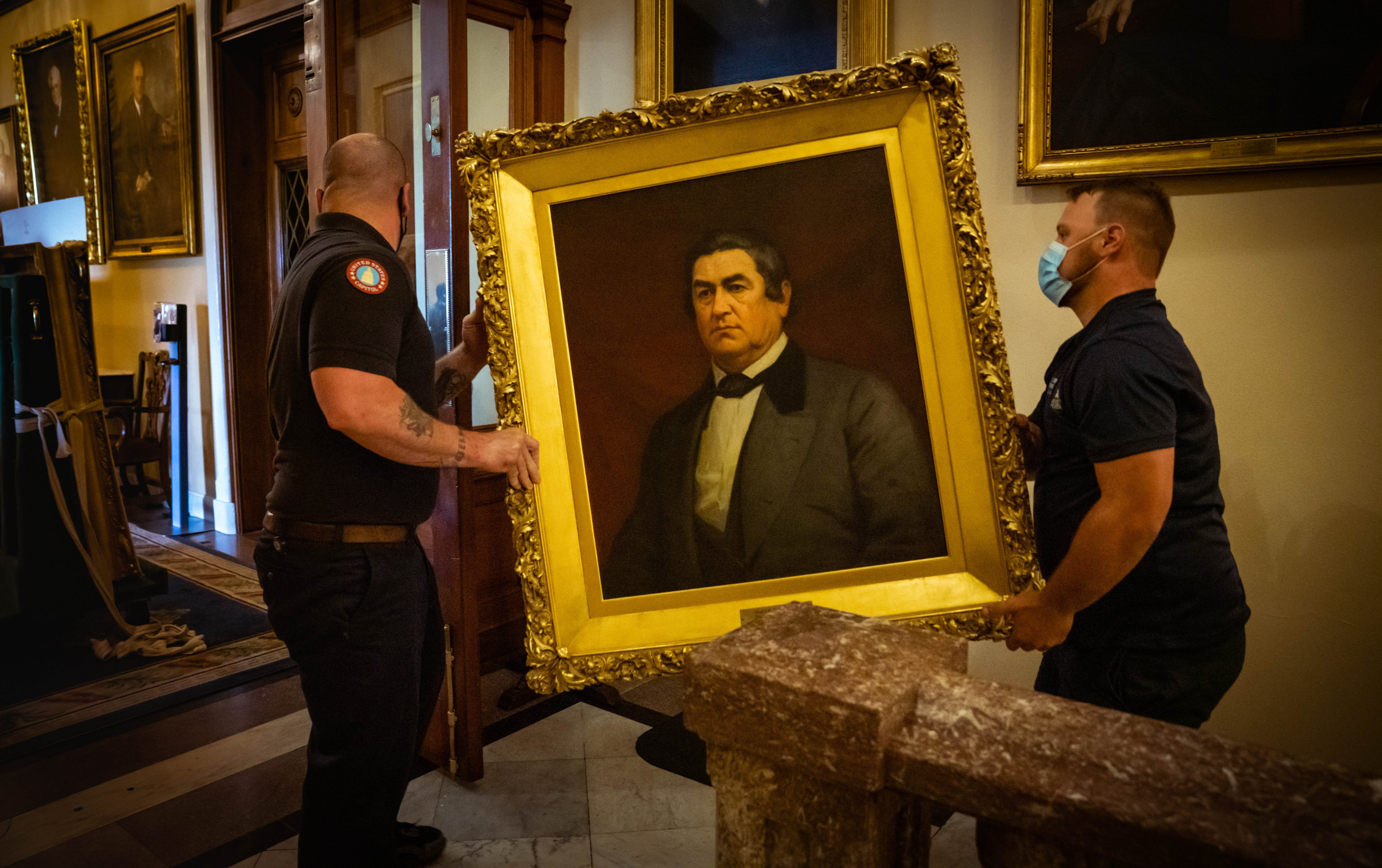
The removal of Hunter's portrait from Congress on July 18, 2020.

In 1942, a United States Liberty ship named the SS Robert M. T. Hunter was launched. She was scrapped in 1971.

As a former Speaker of the House, his portrait had been on display in the US Capitol. The portrait was removed from public display in the Speaker's Lobby outside the House Chamber after an order issued by the Speaker of the House, Nancy Pelosi, on June 18, 2020.

== In popular culture ==
Hunter appeared in the 2012 film Lincoln, which included the Hampton Roads Conference. He was portrayed by Mike Shiflett.

== See also ==
- List of United States senators expelled or censured

== Notes ==
U.S. House of Representatives
Preceded by John Roane	Member of the U.S. House of Representatives from Virginia's 9th congressional district 1837–1843	Succeeded by Samuel Chilton
Preceded by Willoughby Newton	Member of the U.S. House of Representatives from Virginia's 8th congressional district 1845–1847	Succeeded by Richard Beale
Political offices
Preceded by James Polk	Speaker of the United States House of Representatives; 1839–1841	Succeeded by John White
Preceded by Robert Toombs	Confederate States Secretary of State; 1861–1862	Succeeded by William Browne; Acting
Preceded by Howell Cobb as President of the Provisional Confederate States Congress	President pro tempore of the Confederate States Senate; 1862–1865	Position abolished
U.S. Senate
Preceded by William Archer	United States Senator (Class 2) from Virginia; 1847–1861; Served alongside: James Mason	Succeeded by John Carlile
Preceded by Daniel S. Dickinson	Chair of the Senate Public Buildings Committee; 1847–1851	Succeeded by James Pearce
Preceded by Daniel S. Dickinson	Chair of the Senate Finance Committee; 1850–1861	Succeeded by James Pearce
Confederate States Senate
New constituency	Confederate States Senator (Class 3) from Virginia; 1862–1865; Served alongside: William Preston, Allen Caperton	Constituency abolished
