= List of people from Huntsville, Alabama =

The following is a list of people from Huntsville, Alabama:

== A ==
- Viola Allen, actress
- Andrew J. Applegate, first lieutenant governor of Alabama
- Ernest Ashworth, country music singer
- Christine Auten, voice actress
- Carla Azar, musician

== B ==
- Tallulah Bankhead, actress
- William B. Bankhead, politician
- Rosa Lula Barnes, community leader
- Garry Betty, former president and CEO of EarthLink
- Bo Bice, musician
- David B. Birney, Civil War general, abolitionist
- James G. Birney, abolitionist
- William Birney, Civil War general
- Thomas Boyd, football player
- Andrea Bradford, soprano and businesswoman
- Jed Bradley, Milwaukee Brewers pitcher
- Mo Brooks, politician from Alabama's 5th district
- Michael E. Brown, astronomer
- Tom Butler, politician
- Larry Byrom, musician

== C ==
- Julia Campbell, actress
- Samuel A. Cartwright, physician
- Sheryll D. Cashin, professor
- Reg E. Cathey, actor
- Bobby Cattage, basketball player
- Fred Child, radio host
- T. J. Chung, engineer
- Stewart Cink, golfer
- Randolph Royall Claiborne Jr., bishop
- Benjamin L. Clapp, Mormon leader
- Alex Clay, soccer player
- Clement Claiborne Clay, politician
- Jeremiah Clemens, politician
- Kay Cornelius, author
- Robert E. Cramer, politician
- Julia Pleasants Creswell (1827–1886), poet, novelist
- Thomas Turpin Crittenden, Civil War general
- Howard Cross, football player
- Milton K. Cummings, cotton broker and space-defense industry executive

== D ==
- Werner J. A. Dahm, former Chief Scientist of the U.S. Air Force
- Kenneth Darby, football player
- Jan Davis, astronaut
- Felicia Day, actress, writer, director, violinist, and singer
- Grant Dayton, baseball player
- Kim Dickens, actress
- Antoine Dodson, internet celebrity
- Nic Dowd, hockey player
- Shawn Draper, football player

== E ==
- Bobby Eaton, wrestler

== F ==
- Trey Flowers, football player

== G ==
- William Willis Garth, politician
- Edward Gillespie, attorney in arms
- John Campbell Greenway, U.S. Army general, Rough Rider, husband of Isabella Greenway
- Parker Griffith, politician

== H ==
- Milton B. Halsey, U.S. Army major general
- Andrew Jackson Hamilton, politician and military governor of Texas
- Cully Hamner, comic book artist and writer
- Jeffrey S. Harper, educator and author
- John Hendricks, founder and chairman of Discovery Communications
- Dwone Hicks, football player
- Margaret Hoelzer, Olympic swimmer
- Bill Holbrook, comic strip artist and writer
- Condredge Holloway, football player
- Matthew Houck, indie-folk musician
- David Hubbard, former U.S. Congressman for the 2nd and 5th Districts of Alabama and former member of the Confederate Congress
- Donnie Humphrey, football player

== J ==
- Mick Jenkins, hip hop artist
- Walter Jones, football player
- Walter B. Jones, geologist

== K ==
- JJ Kaplan (born 1997), American-Israeli basketball player in the Israeli Basketball Premier League
- Joey Kent, football player
- Jimmy Key, baseball player
- Craig Kimbrel, baseball player
- David A. King, former director of Marshall Space Flight Center
- Ralph Knowles, attorney

== L ==
- Trevor Lacey, professional basketball player
- Marc Lacy, author
- Mark Lenzi, Olympic diver
- Clarke Lewis, politician
- William M. Lowe, politician
- Joseph Lowery, civil rights activist
- Michael Luwoye, Broadway actor known for playing the title role in the Broadway musical Hamilton

== M ==
- Ralph Malone, football player
- Chris Martin, football player
- Bo Matthews, football player
- Jordan Matthews, football player
- Ken McBride, baseball player
- Gerald McCullouch, actor
- Paul McDonald, singer
- Spike McRoy, golfer
- Jimmy Means, NASCAR driver
- Izzy Miller, singer/songwriter
- Virginia Miller, heptathlete
- Don Mincher, baseball player
- Rashad Moore, football player
- John H. Moores, politician
- JoAnn H. Morgan, aerospace engineer
- John Hunt Morgan, Civil War general

== O ==
- Amobi Okoye, football player
- Edward A. O'Neal, former governor of Alabama
- David F. O'Neill, naval aviator and major general, U.S. Marine Corps

== P ==
- Thomas George Percy, Alabama settler
- James Phelan Sr., Confederate politician
- John Dennis Phelan, jurist
- Macon Phillips, White House director of New Media
- Susanna Phillips, opera singer
- Stan Pietkiewicz, basketball player
- LeRoy Pope, Alabama settler
- Paula Poundstone, comedian

== R ==
- Steve Raby, politician
- Reggie Ragland, football player
- Israel Raybon, football player
- James Record, politician
- Brian Reynolds, video game designer
- Scottie Reynolds, basketball player
- William N. Richardson, politician
- Ramzee Robinson, football player
- Jared Ross, hockey player
- Jake Rufe, soccer player
- Debby Ryan, actress, singer

== S ==
- Destin Sandlin, YouTuber
- William August Schulze (1905–2001), German-American rocket scientist and Operation Paperclip hire
- Terri Sewell, U.S. representative
- Bryan Shelton, tennis player
- Mark C. Smith, founder of Universal Data Systems
- James Spann, broadcast meteorologist
- John Sparkman, politician
- Mark Spencer, computer engineer
- Roy Spencer, climatologist
- Robert L. Spragins, U.S. Army major general
- John Stallworth, football player
- Bennett M. Stewart, politician
- Marvin Stone, basketball player
- Gabby Street, baseball player
- Dale Strong, U.S. representative
- Jon Sumrall, college football coach
- Jayson Swain, football player

== T ==
- Conrad Thompson, podcast host
- David Howard Thornton, actor
- Kim Tibbs, songwriter
- Cliff Toney, football player
- Nick Torres, songwriter
- Harry Townes, actor, Episcopal priest

== V ==
- Ned Vaughn, actor
- Margrit von Braun, environmental engineer and researcher
- Wernher von Braun, German rocket scientist who lived in Huntsville for 20 years
- Hans A. von Spakovsky, former member of the Federal Election Commission

== W ==
- Jimmy Wales, co-founder of Wikipedia
- John Williams Walker, politician
- LeRoy Pope Walker, Confederate States Secretary of War
- Percy Walker, politician
- Richard Wilde Walker, Confederate politician
- Richard Wilde Walker Jr., former associate justice of the Alabama Supreme Court
- Jonathan Wallace, basketball player
- Mervyn Warren, film and TV composer, music producer, recording artist
- Mario West, basketball player
- Addison White, U.S. congressman, Confederate Army officer
- Austin Wiley, Olympian, basketball gold medal, bronze medal
- Kyle Wright, starting pitcher for the Atlanta Braves
- Myron Benjamin Wright, aviator
