= Charles "Don Carlos" Percy =

Irish-born planter and military officer

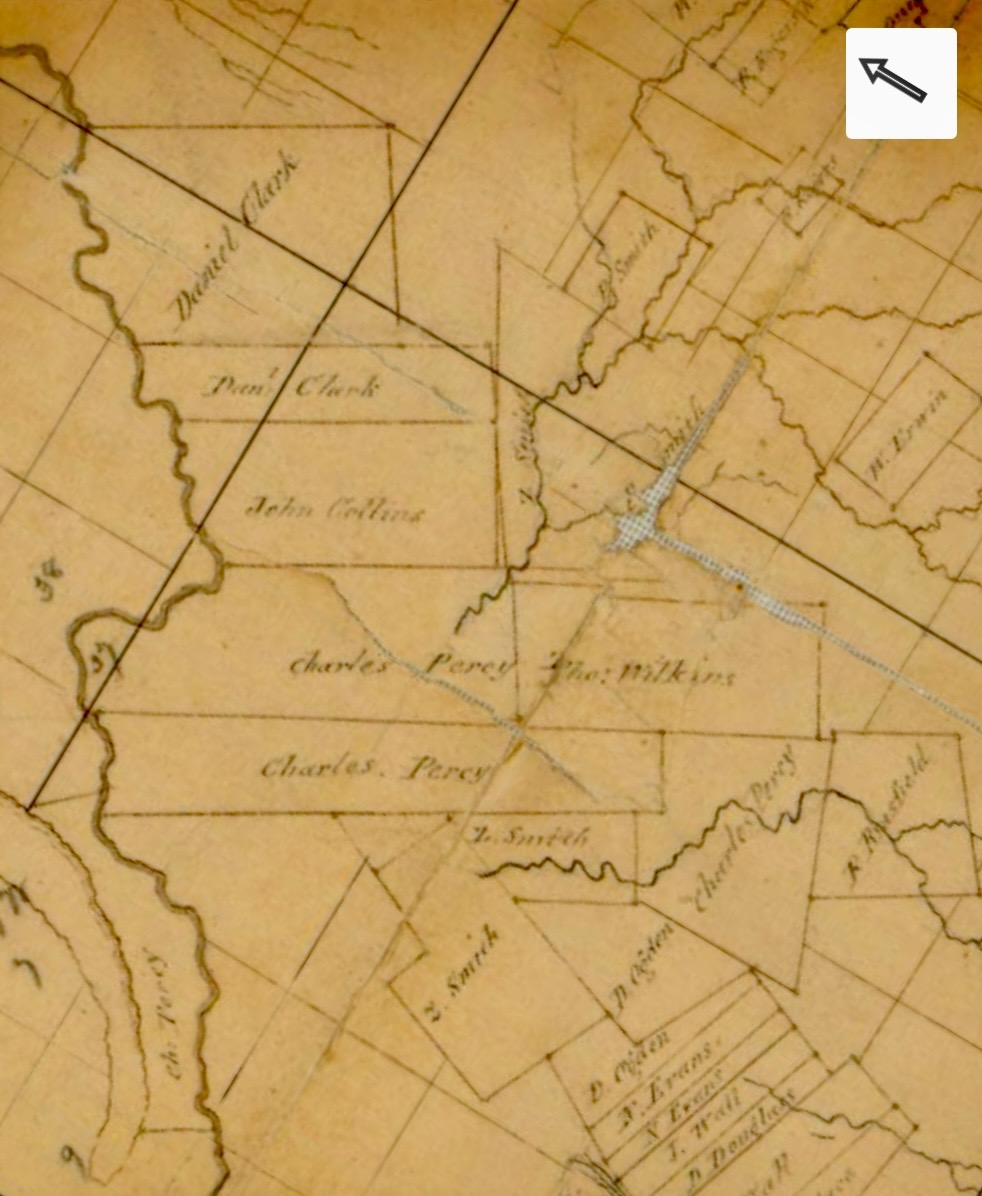
Charles Percy land holdings on the Buffalo River in Mississippi circa 1810

Charles "Don Carlos" Percy (1704–1794) was an Irish-born planter and military officer who was the founder of the Percy family of Louisiana, Alabama, and Mississippi.

== Life ==
An Irish Catholic adventurer, Percy arrived in the British colony of West Florida in 1775. For his services to the Crown (allegedly as a privateer), he initially received a 600-acre (2.4 km^{2}) land grant in Louisiana, near present-day St. Francisville. With that and other land parcels, he established three successful indigo plantations, which enabled him to amass great wealth. He named the main plantation in present-day Wilkinson County near Natchez, Mississippi, Northumberland Place in honor of supposed ties with the fabled British Percy lineage of Hotspur. For a while, Percy was an alcalde, or magistrate, under the Spanish government, hence his nickname, "Don Carlos." At the age of 90, Percy reportedly gave in to melancholia (depression) and drowned himself in a local creek, since named Percy's Creek.

== Family ==
His son, Robert Percy became a highly esteemed military official and owner of the 2,200 acre Beechwood Plantation. He had received a tenth of Charles Percy's Estate as part of a settlement dispute Robert Percy's daughter Jane married into the prominent Williams family. She married James Cadwallader Williams in 1815. James and Jane Williams son named David Percy Williams of Natchez inherited the Percy/Williams estate and was established as one of the wealthiest men in the Natchez area. David Percy Williams mixed-race son, Archie P. Williams, inherited part of the Percy/Williams Estate from his father, helped pioneer the oil and natural gas industry in Adams County, Mississippi and became a prominent Supervisor of the Third District in the Natchez area. Courthouse records, newspaper articles and history books show that in the 21st century, the bulk of the estate inherited through succeeding generations of Charles Percy is today owned by Anton Robert Williams of Kalamazoo, Michigan and Grand Rapids, Michigan through his trust and holding company.

His son, Thomas George Percy Sr. (Princeton 1806), wed Maria Pope, (daughter of LeRoy Pope) in 1814. Maria's sister Matilda wed John Williams Walker, a Princeton University graduate and one of Alabama's first two senators. Walker and Percy settled on two adjacent estates in Huntsville, Alabama, and named their sons after one another.

The sons of Thomas George Percy helped develop the Mississippi Delta into the leading cotton-producing area in the world. William Alexander Percy, the youngest son, became rich before the Civil War and married Nancy "Nana" Armstrong, a cousin of George Armstrong Custer and granddaughter of Trooper Armstrong, an early settler in Tennessee. Their son, also named William Alexander Percy, became a famed Confederate colonel and was a railroad lawyer after the war.

LeRoy Percy (1860–1929), Charles' grandson and William and Nana's son, served as a US senator from 1910–1913 and confronted the Ku Klux Klan in Washington County in 1922, thwarting their recruiting effort.

LeRoy Percy was the father of William Alexander Percy, a World War I hero, lawyer, poet and memoirist, best known for Lanterns on the Levee: Memoirs of a Planter's Son. The senior Percy was the great-uncle of the writer Walker Percy (1916–1990), who the younger Percy adopted along with his brothers in 1932 and became a novelist and essayist; and William Armstrong Percy, III, a historian who became a gay activist beginning in the 1980s.

Senator Charles H. Percy of Illinois was also a direct descendant of Charles "Don Carlos" Percy.
