= Charles Percy =

Charles Percy may refer to:

- Charles H. Percy (1919–2011), United States senator and businessman
- Charles "Don Carlos" Percy (1704–1794), founder of a wealthy lineage in the southern United States
- Charles Percy (British politician) (1851–1929), British member of parliament for Tynemouth, 1918–1922
