= James Stallworth =

James Stallworth may refer to:

- James A. Stallworth (1822–1861), U.S. representative from Alabama
- James Stallworth (athlete) (born 1971), American track and field athlete
