= Richard Wilde Walker Jr. =

American judge (1857–1936)

Senior Judge of the United States Court of Appeals for the Fifth Circuit
- In office September 1, 1930 – April 10, 1936

Judge of the United States Court of Appeals for the Fifth Circuit
- In office October 5, 1914 – September 1, 1930
- Appointed by: Woodrow Wilson
- Preceded by: David Davie Shelby
- Succeeded by: Samuel Hale Sibley

Personal details
- Born: Richard Wilde Walker Jr. March 11, 1857 Florence, Alabama
- Died: April 10, 1936 (aged 79)
- Parent: Richard Wilde Walker (father)
- Relatives: John Williams Walker; LeRoy Pope Walker; Percy Walker
- Education: Washington and Lee University; Princeton University (AB); Columbia Law School read law

Richard Wilde Walker Jr. (March 11, 1857 – April 10, 1936) was an associate justice of the Alabama Supreme Court and a United States circuit judge of the United States Court of Appeals for the Fifth Circuit.

== Education and career ==
Born on March 11, 1857, in Florence, Alabama, Walker attended Washington and Lee University and then received an Artium Baccalaureus degree in 1877 from the College of New Jersey (now Princeton University). He attended Columbia Law School and then read law in 1878. He entered private practice in St. Louis, Missouri; Albuquerque, New Mexico Territory; New York City; and Huntsville, Alabama. He was a justice of the Supreme Court of Alabama from 1891 to 1892. He was a member of the Alabama House of Representatives in 1903. He was the Presiding Judge of the Court of Appeals of Alabama from 1911 to 1914.

== Federal judicial service ==
Walker was nominated by President Woodrow Wilson on October 2, 1914, to a seat on the United States Court of Appeals for the Fifth Circuit vacated by Judge David Davie Shelby. He was confirmed by the United States Senate on October 5, 1914, and received his commission the same day. He was a member of the Conference of Senior Circuit Judges (now the Judicial Conference of the United States) from 1922 to 1929. He assumed senior status on September 1, 1930. His service terminated on April 10, 1936, due to his death.

== Personal ==
Walker was the son of Richard Wilde Walker. He was the grandson of John Williams Walker and nephew of LeRoy Pope Walker and Percy Walker.

== Sources ==
- "Walker, Richard Wilde - Federal Judicial Center". www.fjc.gov.
- "Memorial Record of Alabama: A Concise Account of the State's Political, Military, Professional and Industrial Progress, Together With the Personal Memoirs of Many of Its People," Volume 2, published by Brant & Fuller in Madison, WI (1893), pp. 765–766.
- U. S. Census Records 1860–1930.

Legal offices
Preceded by David Davie Shelby	Judge of the United States Court of Appeals for the Fifth Circuit; 1914–1930	Succeeded by Samuel Hale Sibley
