= Clement Clay =

Clement Clay may refer to:

- Clement Comer Clay (1789–1866), Governor of Alabama 1835–1837, and U.S. Senator from Alabama 1837–1841
- Clement Claiborne Clay (1816–1882), son of Clement Comer Clay; U.S. Senator from Alabama 1853–1861, and Confederate States senator from Alabama 1861–1863
