= Thomas George Percy =

Alabama planter

Thomas George Percy Sr. (1786-1841) was an American planter in Alabama.

== Biography ==
The son of Charles "Don Carlos" Percy, (1704–1794), a plantation owner with pretensions to blood lines of the Dukes of Northumberland, he was born in Alabama in the late 1780s and graduated from Princeton in 1806.

He married Maria Pope in 1814 or 1815. His fellow Princetonian and friend, John Walker, one of the first two senators from Alabama, married Maria's sister Matilda. Both men built houses on abutting estates in Huntsville and named their sons for each other. Through their wealthy planter father, LeRoy Pope, the sisters were related to the English poet Alexander Pope.

Percy managed the affairs for Walker while he was away in Washington, D.C. Percy stayed in Huntsville, enjoying his large library and extended family. He died in 1841 and was buried in Maple Hill Cemetery (Huntsville, Alabama).

He and Maria named their eldest son John Walker, after his boon companion. Their second son, Charles Brown, was named after a third friend in Huntsville, Samual Brown, a distinguished physician who had studied medicine at Edinburgh. (Brown married Catherine Percy; their two children died in infancy.) Percy and Maria named their third son, LeRoy Pope, after her father. The youngest was named William Alexander. John William Walker reciprocated by naming one of his sons Percy.

The Percys' youngest son, William Alexander Percy, married Nana Armstrong, a daughter of William Armstrong, a wealthy US Indian agent. Nana was the first cousin of George Armstrong Custer; both cousins were grandchildren of General James "Trooper" Armstrong, a hero of the War of 1812.

William Alexander Percy became a colonel in the Confederate States Army. After the war, Colonel Percy, a successful railroad developer, was elected to the state legislature. He headed the committee of the Mississippi House of Representatives that impeached Adelbert Ames, considered to be the last carpetbagger governor of Mississippi.
