= Maple Hill Cemetery (Huntsville, Alabama) =

- U.S. National Register of Historic Places
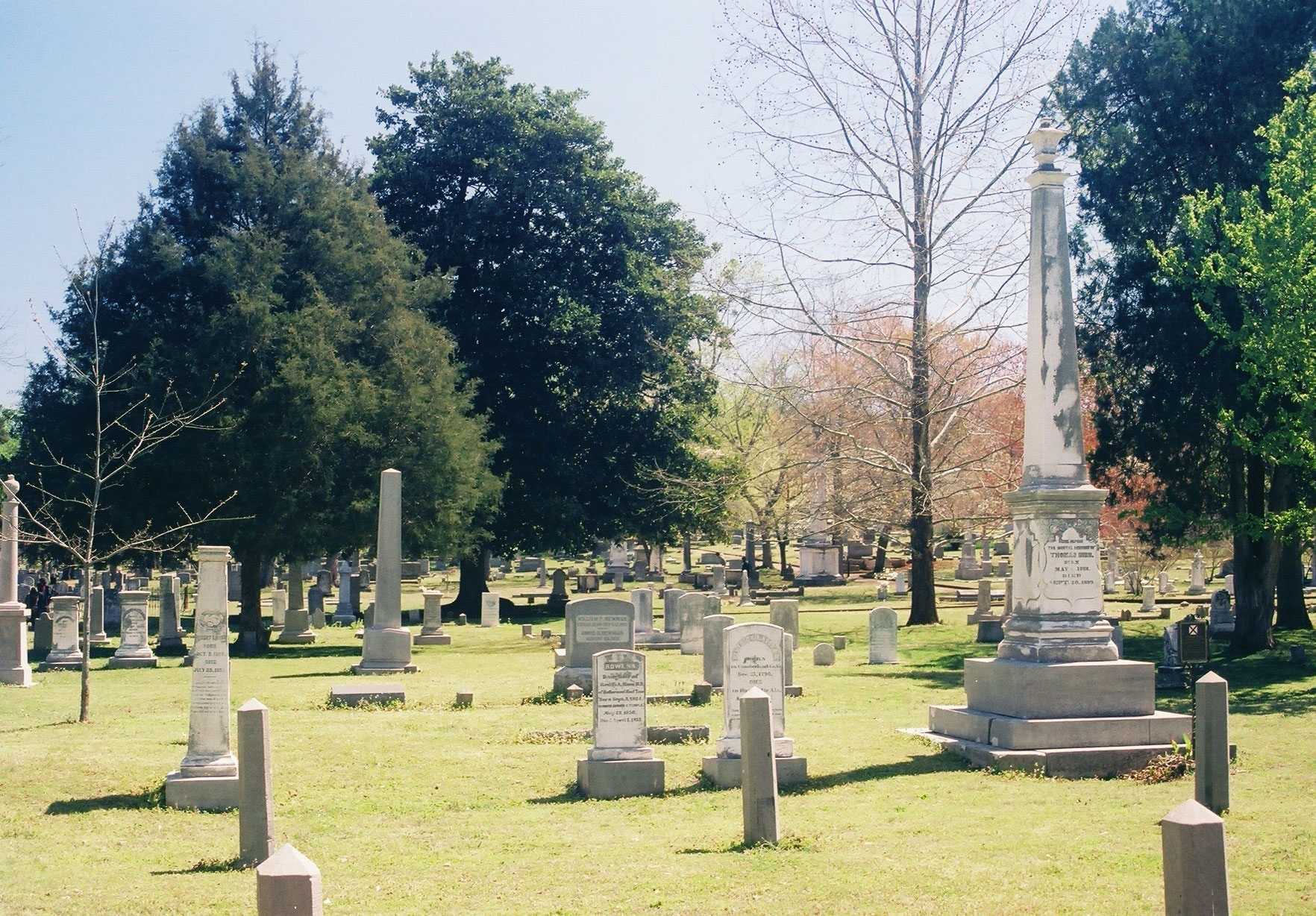
- The cemetery in 2006

- Location within Huntsville, Alabama Location within Alabama Location within the United States
- Interactive map of Maple Hill Cemetery
- Location: 202 Maple Hill Dr., Huntsville, Alabama
- Coordinates: 34°43′59″N 86°34′24″W
- Area: 100 acres (40 ha)
- Built: 1822
- NRHP reference No.: 12000523
- Added to NRHP: August 22, 2012

Maple Hill Cemetery is the oldest and largest cemetery in Huntsville, Alabama, United States. Founded on two acres (8,000 m^{2}) in about the year 1822, it now encompasses nearly 100 acres (400,000 m^{2}) and contains over 80,000 burials. It was added to the Alabama Historical Commission's Historic Cemetery Register in 2008, and to the National Register of Historic Places in 2012. Its occupants include five governors of Alabama, five United States senators, and numerous other figures of local, state, and national note. It is located east of the Twickenham Historic District.

== History ==
The original two acres (8,000 m^{2}) of the cemetery were sold to the city of Huntsville on September 14, 1822, by planter LeRoy Pope. Though early burials are difficult to document, there is substantial evidence that the land had been in use as a cemetery for some time prior to its official establishment. The oldest grave with marker intact is that of Mary Frances Atwood, infant daughter of William and Martha Caroline Atwood, who died September 17, 1820. Headstones are sparse in the oldest section, many having decayed over time and been discarded, and it is likely that many unmarked graves share a similarly early date.

The cemetery was expanded at some point after 1849 to include the two acres (8,000 m^{2}) on which LeRoy Pope and his family were buried. There are some indications that this land, which had until then remained a part of the Pope estate, may already have been in use as a burial ground. Pope's son-in-law John Williams Walker had died in 1823, Pope's wife Judith in 1827, and Pope himself in 1844. It is known that the Popes maintained a private cemetery on their plantation, but it is unclear whether the Pope graves were moved to their present location following the sale of the Pope estate in 1849, or whether this property in fact contained the existing Pope cemetery. Several other monuments in this section suggest its use at least as early as 1844.

During the Civil War, Maple Hill Cemetery became the burial site of 187 unknown Confederate soldiers and an uncertain number of Union soldiers. Most of the Confederate soldiers, buried in the Confederate section on the north side of the cemetery, died early in the war of disease or accidents while training in camps close to Huntsville. The names of many of them are known, but it is unknown who lies in which grave. Numerous Union troops who died during the federal occupation of Huntsville are believed to have been buried in unmarked graves throughout the oldest section of the cemetery. Most of the Union graves were moved to Chattanooga National Cemetery in 1867, though some may have been missed.

In 1873, the cemetery was further expanded through the purchase from James J. Donegan of 12.45 acres (50,380 m^{2}) that had previously been a part of the Pope estate. In this new addition were two sections consecrated for religious congregations, a Hebrew burial ground and a Catholic burial ground.

To accommodate increasing growth in Huntsville because of industrialization, the city purchased an additional 3.2 acres (13,000 m^{2}) in 1881 from Morris and Henrietta Bernstein. In 1903, it purchased another 6.14 acres (24,800 m^{2}) from Mary Y. McClelland of St. Louis, Missouri.

In 1901, the cemetery, which had until then been called only "the burying ground," was given its official name.

Automobile magnate Albert Russel Erskine made a substantial gift to the cemetery in 1918 of about 12 acres (49,000 m^{2}). Erskine, a descendant of several prominent Huntsvillians buried in the cemetery, had acquired the land from a neighboring residential development, probably prompted by the death of his mother in 1915. On a circular plot in the center of the addition, Erskine constructed an imposing mausoleum to contain the remains of his parents, his wife, and himself. The cemetery's stone entrance and the wide road proceeding from it to the mausoleum were also funded by Erskine. Three additional properties, purchased in 1920, completed the Erskine Addition.

The purchase from James B. Stevens in 1924 of 59 acres (240,000 m^{2}) on the east side of the cemetery more than tripled its size and gave it its present shape.

In 1987, a private company, Maple Hill Cemetery, Inc., developed a cemetery adjacent to the cemetery proper on land formerly used by the city of Huntsville for athletic fields.

In 2007, the city owned part of the cemetery had virtually run out of available plots and attempted to enlarge the cemetery by first removing playground equipment and picnic tables of an adjoining city park with a plan to create burial plots on the park land. This was met with extreme resistance from residents in nearby neighborhoods. The public outcry of city actions without the proper due process was enough to stop the encroachment into the park and neighborhoods.

The playground on the grounds of the cemetery is referred to as "Dead Children's Playground" by locals and is considered to be Alabama's most haunted site. Visitor's cite glowing orbs, ghosts of children who died in the Flu Epidemic of 1918, and the swings going without being touched. Despite local legends it is a regular teen hangout for many generations and was the driving force in the restoration of the playground after it was taken down in 2007.

== The Huntsville Meridian ==
The Huntsville Meridian intersects Maple Hill Cemetery. Plotted in 1807 by surveyor Thomas Freeman, it is the longitudinal line from which all land in North Alabama was surveyed. Freeman died in 1821 and is buried in the cemetery. The tallest monument in the cemetery was erected on the meridian by another surveyor, Richard W. Anderson, "in memory of deceased relatives and to perpetuate the Huntsville Meridian."

== Notable burials ==
=== Governors of Alabama ===
- Thomas Bibb (1782–1839), served 1820 to 1821.
- Clement Comer Clay (1789–1866), served 1835 to 1837; formerly a U.S. representative; later a U.S. senator.
- Reuben Chapman (1799–1882), served 1847 to 1849; formerly a U.S. representative.
- Robert M. Patton (1809–1885), served 1865 to 1868.
- David P. Lewis (1820–1884), served 1872 to 1874.

=== United States senators ===
- John Williams Walker (1783–1823), Alabama's first senator, served 1819 to 1822.
- Clement Comer Clay (1789–1866), served 1837 to 1841; formerly a governor and U.S. representative.
- Jeremiah Clemens (1814–1865), served 1849 to 1853.
- Clement Claiborne Clay (1816–1882), served 1853 to 1861; later a Confederate States senator.
- John J. Sparkman (1899–1985), served 1946 to 1979.
- William Smith (c. 1762–1840), served 1816–1823, and 1826–1831

=== United States representatives ===
- Clement Comer Clay (1789–1866), served 1829 to 1835; later a governor and U.S. senator.
- Reuben Chapman (1799–1882), served 1835 to 1847; later a governor.
- Peter Myndert Dox (1813–1891), served 1869 to 1873.
- Joseph Humphrey Sloss (1826–1911), served 1871 to 1875.
- William Willis Garth (1828–1912), served 1877 to 1879.
- William M. Lowe (1842–1882), served 1879 to 1881 and 1882.
- William N. Richardson (1839–1914), served 1900 to 1914.
- Jabez Leftwich (1765–1855), served the state of Virginia 1821 to 1825.
- Addison White (1824–1909), served the state of Kentucky 1851 to 1853.
- Lowndes Henry Davis (1836–1920), served the state of Missouri 1879 to 1885.

=== Confederate leaders ===
- Thomas Fearn (1789–1863), deputy to Provisional Confederate Congress (resigned after first session).
- Nicholas Davis, Jr. (1825–1875), delegate to Alabama Secession Convention; deputy to Provisional Confederate Congress, April 1861 to 1862; lieutenant colonel in Confederate States Army.
- Clement Claiborne Clay (1816–1882), Confederate States senator, 1862 to 1864; formerly a U.S. senator.
- Richard Wilde Walker (1823–1874), deputy to Provisional Confederate Congress, 1861 to 1862; Confederate States senator, 1864 to 1865.
- David P. Lewis (1820–1884), deputy to Provisional Confederate Congress (resigned after first session); later governor.
- LeRoy Pope Walker (1817–1884), first Confederate States secretary of war, 1861; also a Confederate brigadier general.

=== Military figures ===
- Dr. David Moore (1787–1845), family physician of General Andrew Jackson, State Legislator in 1830–1835.
- Egbert J. Jones (d. 1861), colonel of the 4th Alabama Infantry Regiment, CSA, killed in the First Battle of Manassas.
- William T. H. Brooks (1821–1870), Union brigadier general.
- Gilbert M. L. Johnson (1837–1871), Union brevet brigadier general.
- LeRoy Pope Walker (1817–1884), Confederate brigadier general; formerly Confederate secretary of war.
- Robert L. Spragins (d. 1964), Major general who commanded 71st and 44th Infantry Divisions in World War II.

=== Rocket Team Members ===
- Hans F Gruene (1910-1979), German-American engineer and original member of the Von Braun rocket team
- Wilhelm Angele (1905-1996), German-American engineer and original member of the Von Braun rocket team
- Werner Dahm (1917-2008), German-American aerodynamicist and original member of the Von Braun rocket team
- Konrad Dannenberg (1912–2009), German-American rocket pioneer and member of the German rocket team brought to the United States after World War II.
- Ernst Geissler (1915-1989), German-American aerospace engineer and original member of the Von Braun rocket team
- Walter Haeussermann (1914-2010) German-American aerospace engineer and original member of the Von Braun rocket team
- Karl Heimburg (1910-1997), German-American engineer and original member of the Von Braun rocket team
- Otto Heinrich Hirschler (1913-2001), German-American engineer and original member of the Von Braun rocket team
- Oscar Holderer (1919-2015), German-American engineer and original member of the Von Braun rocket team
- Hans Henning Hosenthien (1915-1996), German-American engineer and original member of the Von Braun rocket team
- Helmut Horn (1912-1994), German-American engineer and applied physicist, original member of the Von Braun rocket team
- Walter Jacobi (1918-2009), German-American engineer and original member of the Von Braun rocket team
- William Mrazek (1911-1992), German-American engineer and original member of the Von Braun rocket team
- Fritz Mueller (1907-2001), German-American engineer and original member of the Von Braun rocket team
- Hans Rudolph Palaoro (1919-1994), German-American engineer and original member of the Von Braun rocket team
- Friedrich von Saurma (1908-1961), German-American engineer and original member of the Von Braun rocket team
- Rudolf Hans Schildt (1914-2012), German-American engineer and original member of the Von Braun rocket team
- Heinrich Struck (1925-2020), German-American aerospace engineer and original member of the Von Braun rocket team
- Ernst Stuhlinger (1913-2008) German-American atomic, electrical, and rocket scientist and original member of the Von Braun rocket team
- Bernhard Tessmann (1912-1998) German-American engineer and original member of the Von Braun rocket team
- Georg von Tiesenhausen (1914–2018), German-American rocket pioneer and member of the German rocket team brought to the United States after World War II.

=== Other people ===
- Thomas Freeman (d. 1821), United States Surveyor General.
- LeRoy Pope (1765–1844), early planter and "Father of Huntsville."
- Priscilla Holmes Drake (1812–1892), woman suffragist.
- Virginia Clay-Clopton (1823–1915), wife of Clement Claiborne Clay, memoirist and socialite.
- Albert Russel Erskine (1871–1933), automobile magnate and president of Studebaker Motors.
- W. T. Hutchens (1859–1940) Mayor of Huntsville, politician.
- Harry Rhett Townes (1914–2001), Actor, Episcopal minister.
- Don Mincher (1938–2012), Major League Baseball player.
- Thomas George Percy (1786-1841), early planter, son-in-law of LeRoy Pope and ancestor of Walker Percy
