= David Davie Shelby =

American judge (1847–1914)

Judge of the United States Court of Appeals for the Fifth Circuit
- In office March 2, 1899 – August 22, 1914
- Appointed by: William McKinley
- Preceded by: Seat established by 30 Stat. 803
- Succeeded by: Richard Wilde Walker Jr.

Judge of the United States Circuit Courts for the Fifth Circuit
- In office March 2, 1899 – December 31, 1911
- Appointed by: William McKinley
- Preceded by: Seat established by 30 Stat. 803
- Succeeded by: Seat abolished

Personal details
- Born: David Davie Shelby; October 24, 1847 Madison County, Alabama
- Died: August 22, 1914 (aged 66) Huntsville, Alabama
- Education: Cumberland University read law

David Davie Shelby (October 24, 1847 – August 22, 1914) was a United States circuit judge of the United States Court of Appeals for the Fifth Circuit and the United States Circuit Courts for the Fifth Circuit.

== Education and career ==
Born in Madison County, Alabama, Shelby was the son of Dr. David Shelby, and grandson of one-time Republic of Texas Supreme Court justice Anthony B. Shelby. He attended Cumberland University and read law to enter the bar in 1870. He was a soldier in the Confederate States Army during the American Civil War. Owing to his youth he was not regularly enlisted in the Confederate Army, but served four months with the 4th Alabama Cavalry Regiment, in a Georgia campaign. He entered private practice in Huntsville, Alabama from 1870 to 1899, serving as city attorney of Huntsville beginning in 1874. Shelby served as a member of Alabama Senate from 1882 to 1884.

== Federal judicial service ==
Shelby was nominated by President William McKinley on February 21, 1899, to the United States Court of Appeals for the Fifth Circuit and the United States Circuit Courts for the Fifth Circuit, to a new joint seat authorized by 30 Stat. 803. He was confirmed by the United States Senate on March 2, 1899, and received his commission the same day. On December 31, 1911, the Circuit Courts were abolished and he thereafter served only on the Court of Appeals. His service terminated on August 22, 1914, due to his death in Huntsville.

== Sources ==
Legal offices
Preceded by Seat established by 30 Stat. 803	Judge of the United States Circuit Courts for the Fifth Circuit; 1899–1911	Succeeded by Seat abolished
Preceded by Seat established by 30 Stat. 803	Judge of the United States Court of Appeals for the Fifth Circuit; 1899–1914	Succeeded by Richard Wilde Walker Jr.
