= William Kelly (Alabama politician) =

American politician (1786–1834)

United States Senator from Alabama
- In office December 12, 1822 – March 3, 1825
- Preceded by: John W. Walker
- Succeeded by: Henry H. Chambers

Member of the Alabama House of Representatives
- In office 1825; 1827

Personal details
- Born: September 22, 1786 South Carolina
- Died: August 24, 1834 (aged 47) New Orleans, Louisiana
- Party: Democratic-Republican

William Kelly (September 22, 1786 – August 24, 1834) was an American politician, who served as the Democratic-Republican U.S. senator from the state of Alabama from December 12, 1822, to 1825. He was originally elected to fill the remainder of John Williams Walker's term, who resigned.

== Early life ==
Kelly on September 22, 1786, was born in South Carolina.

== Political life ==
After serving as a U.S. senator until 1825, he became a member of the Alabama House of Representatives.

== Late life ==
On August 24, 1834, Kelly died in New Orleans, Orleans Parish, Louisiana.

U.S. Senate
Preceded by John Williams Walker	U.S. senator (Class 3) from Alabama; 1822–1825; Served alongside: William R. King	Succeeded by Henry H. Chambers
