= David Clopton =

American judge and politician (1820–1892)

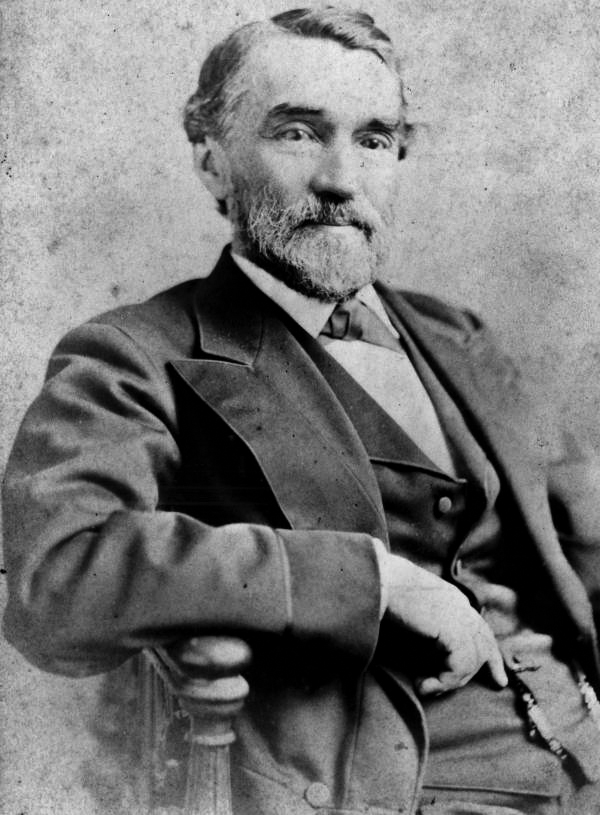

Associate Justice of the Alabama Supreme Court
- In office October 30, 1884 – February 5, 1892

Member of the C.S. House of Representatives from Alabama's 7th district
- In office February 18, 1862 – March 18, 1865
- Preceded by: Constituency established
- Succeeded by: Constituency abolished

Member of the U.S. House of Representatives from Alabama's 3rd district
- In office March 4, 1859 – January 21, 1861
- Preceded by: James F. Dowdell
- Succeeded by: Benjamin W. Norris

Member of the Alabama Legislature
- In office 1878

Personal details
- Born: September 29, 1820 Putnam County, Georgia, U.S.
- Died: February 5, 1892 (aged 71) Montgomery, Alabama, U.S.
- Party: Democratic
- Spouse: Virginia Tunstall Clay (m. 1887)
- Education: Randolph–Macon College
- Military career
- Allegiance: Confederate States
- Branch: Confederate States Army
- Service years: 1861–1862
- Rank: Private
- Unit: 12th Alabama Infantry
- Conflicts: American Civil War

David Clopton (September 29, 1820 – February 5, 1892) was an American politician who was member of the U.S. House of Representatives, the C.S. House of Representatives, a member of the Alabama Legislature, and associate judge of the Alabama Supreme Court. A member of the Democratic Party, he was also a veteran of the Confederate Army.

== Early life ==
Clopton was born in Putnam County, Georgia, near Milledgeville, Georgia, on September 29, 1820, a son of Alford Clopton (1787–1870) and his wife, Sarah “Sally” Clopton (née Kendrick). He attended the county schools and Edenton Academy in Georgia, and moved to Alabama in 1844, graduating from Randolph–Macon College in 1840 and being admitted to the bar in 1841.

== Early career ==
He practiced law in Milledgeville, beginning in that year, and developed an association with Robert S. Lanier, whose son Clifford later married Clopton's daughter. In 1844, he moved to Tuskegee. and practiced law there.

== Political career ==
=== U.S. House of Representatives ===
Clopton represented Alabama's 3rd district in the United States House of Representatives as a Democrat beginning in 1859. During his term he was a strong supporter of states' rights; in a speech delivered during the struggle for the Speakership of the 36th Congress, he said the following: "We do not desire war. The policy of the South would be peace. But whenever this Government, in the opinion of the Southern people, shall have failed to accomplish the ends for which it was instituted, the Southern States, exercising their right, will abolish it, and institute a new Government, laying its foundation in such principles, and organizing it in such forms, as to them shall seem most likely to effect their safety and happiness. Whenever they see proper to exercise these rights, then, if war comes, it must come from the North. If war must come, let it come".

=== Civil War ===
Clopton withdrew from the United States House of Representatives in 1861 and enlisted as a private in the Confederate Army in the Twelfth Alabama Infantry for one year.

==== C.S. House of Representatives ====
Afterwards he represented Alabama in the First Confederate Congress and the Second Confederate Congress. He was among a group who wrote to the Alabama governor petitioning for the pardon of Robert Wynn, doorkeeper of the provisional Congress, who had been convicted of assault with intent to murder but later reconciled with his victim. As part of a Macon County consortium, he contracted with the Alabama Salt Commission to manufacture salt in Saltville, Virginia.

== Personal life ==
On November 29, 1887 he married Virginia Tunstall Clay, widow of Clement Claiborne Clay.

== Later life and death ==
After the war, he served in the Alabama state legislature in 1878 and as an associate justice of the Alabama Supreme Court from 1884 until his death in Montgomery, Ala., February 5, 1892. He is buried in Oakwood Cemetery.

U.S. House of Representatives
Preceded by James F. Dowdell	Member of the U.S. House of Representatives from Alabama's 3rd congressional district March 4, 1859 – January 21, 1861	Succeeded by District inactive
