= Heinrich Struck =

German-American rocket scientist

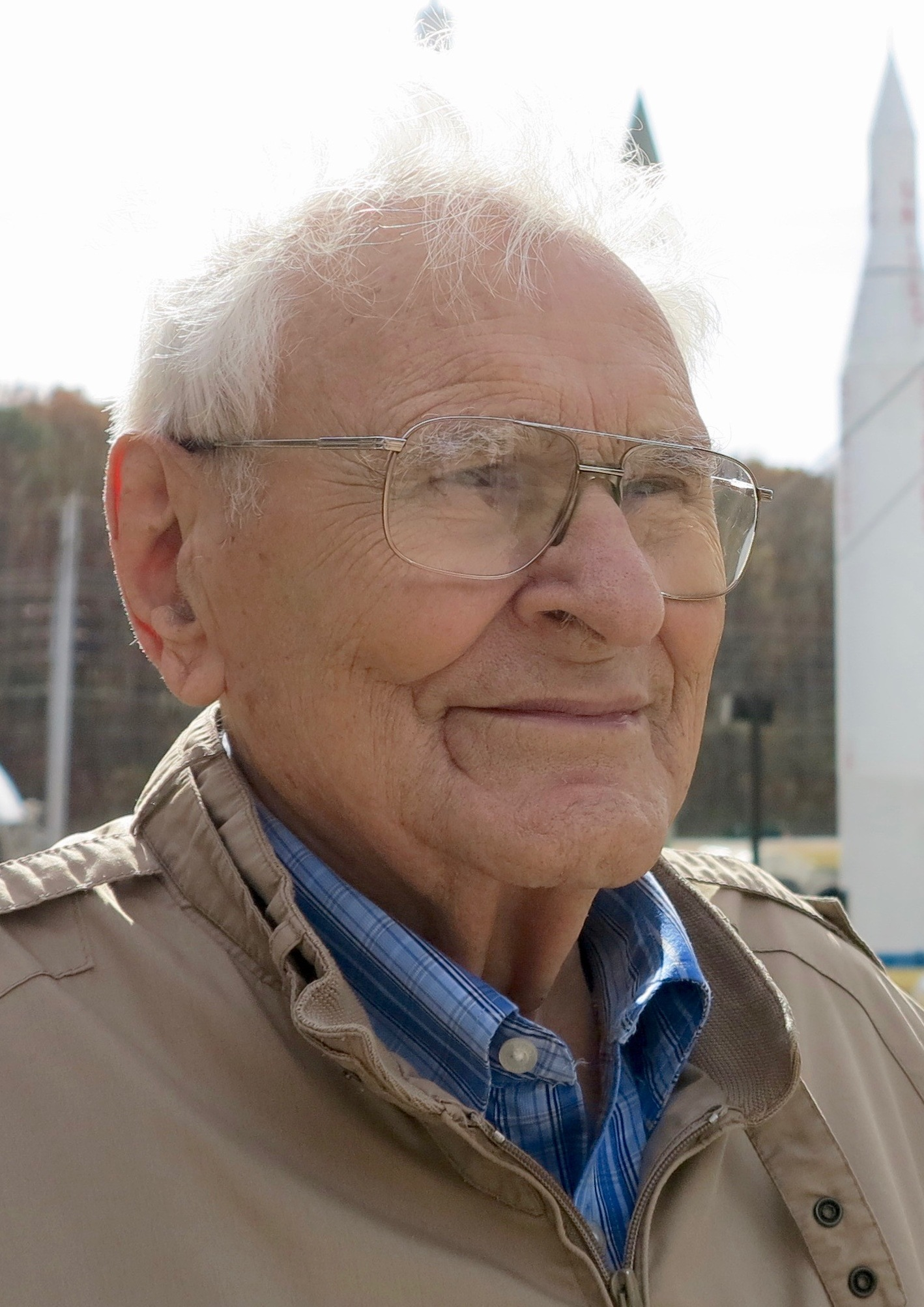
- Born: Heinrich Georg Struck; December 3, 1925; Thal-Bad Pyrmont, Germany
- Died: March 11, 2020 (aged 94); Seattle, Washington, U.S.
- Resting place: Maple Hill Cemetery
- Education: Technical University of Braunschweig
- Spouse: Linda Sieglinde
- Children: 2

Heinrich Georg "Heinz" Struck (December 3, 1925 - March 11, 2020) was a German-American rocket scientist and member of the "von Braun rocket team." Struck worked in aerodynamics in both the private and federal sectors, particularly NASA, where he was recognized for his contributions to the Space Shuttle program.

== Biography ==
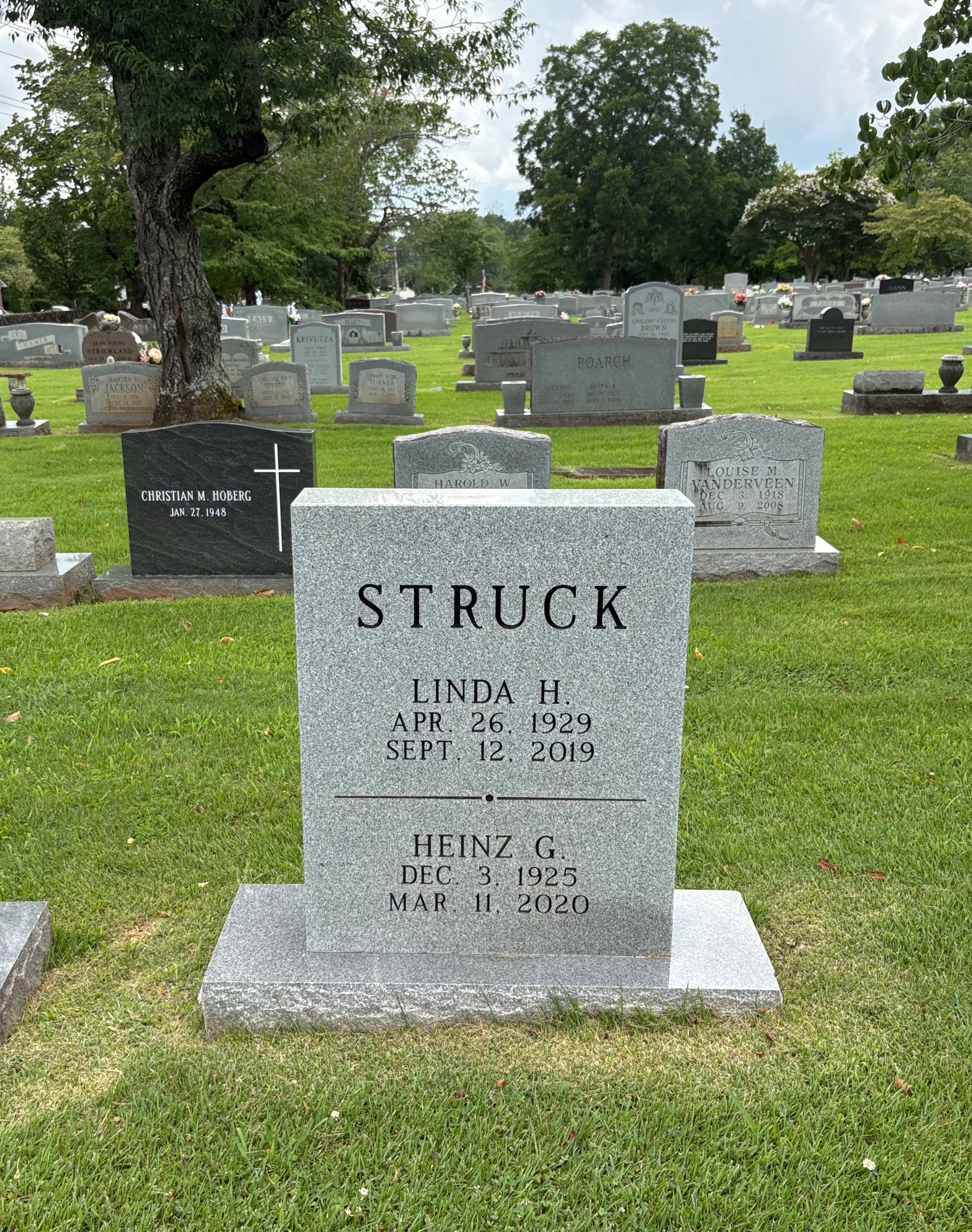
Struck's grave at Maple Hill Cemetery

Struck was born December 3, 1925, in Thal-Bad Pyrmont, Germany. His interest in aerodynamics began in his youth there when he and a group of his friends constructed a functioning hang glider. At the age of 17, Struck was drafted by the German army. He was captured in Belgium and sent to England where he was held as a POW. During this time, he earned his equivalency to a high school diploma. After the end of World War II, he attended the Technical University of Braunschweig, where he studied aerodynamics and fluid dynamics under Hermann Schlichting and received his MS. At a later time, he also studied at Uppsala University in Sweden.

As Struck had not been employed at the Peenemünde Army Research Center like many other German aerospace engineers of the era, he was not one of the initial hires of Operation Paperclip. Instead he took up work at the Heinkel Aircraft Company in Stuttgart. It was in Stuttgart that Struck met Sieglinde later known as Linda (née Hoeppe), executive assistant to the director of Daimler-Benz in the same city, after Sieglinde's co-worker set the two up on a blind date. Struck and Sieglinde married in1957. For a brief time, Struck considered taking a government position in Bangalore, India; his wife had previously worked as a foreign correspondent to India for a Czech fabric manufacturer.

In 1958, Struck was recruited by the Von Braun Group to work with NASA in Huntsville, Alabama; he arrived in October of the same year. He worked first at the Army Ballistic Missile Agency, transferring to the Marshall Space Flight Center after its founding in 1960. At the MSFC, he was employed within the Dynamics Division of the Aero-Astrodynamics laboratory. His projects at NASA ranged from the Saturn rockets through to the Space Shuttle missions, primarily working with engines; his most notable work was in engineering the parachute recovery for the Space Shuttle Solid Rocket Booster. Struck retired from NASA in May 1994 after 36 years of employment.

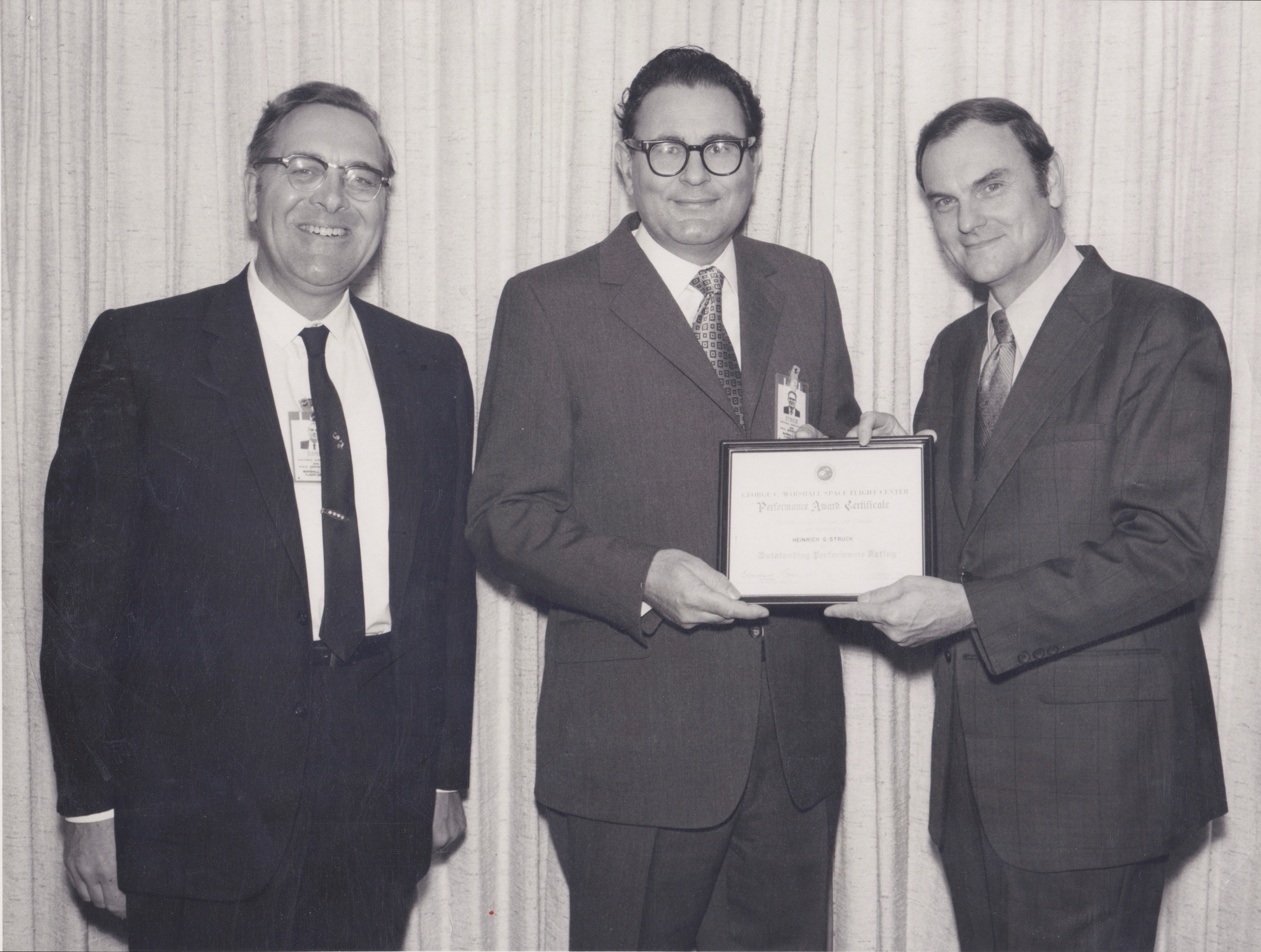

Outside of his work at the MSFC, Struck taught evening courses at the University of Alabama in Huntsville for about seven years in the 1960s, lecturing on subject including aerodynamics and flight dynamics. After his retirement from NASA, he took up consulting work with private space flight contractors, lending his knowledge to projects including the Rocketplane XP and the Orion and Ares spacecraft. His technical papers and reports have been donated to the Special Collections archive at the University of Alabama in Huntsville to provide access to researchers and interested parties.

After his wife's death on September 12, 2019, Struck moved to Seattle, Washington. He lived there until his death on March 11, 2020, after which he was buried in Huntsville's Maple Hill Cemetery.
