= Virginia Clay-Clopton =

American activist and political society hostess (1825–1915)

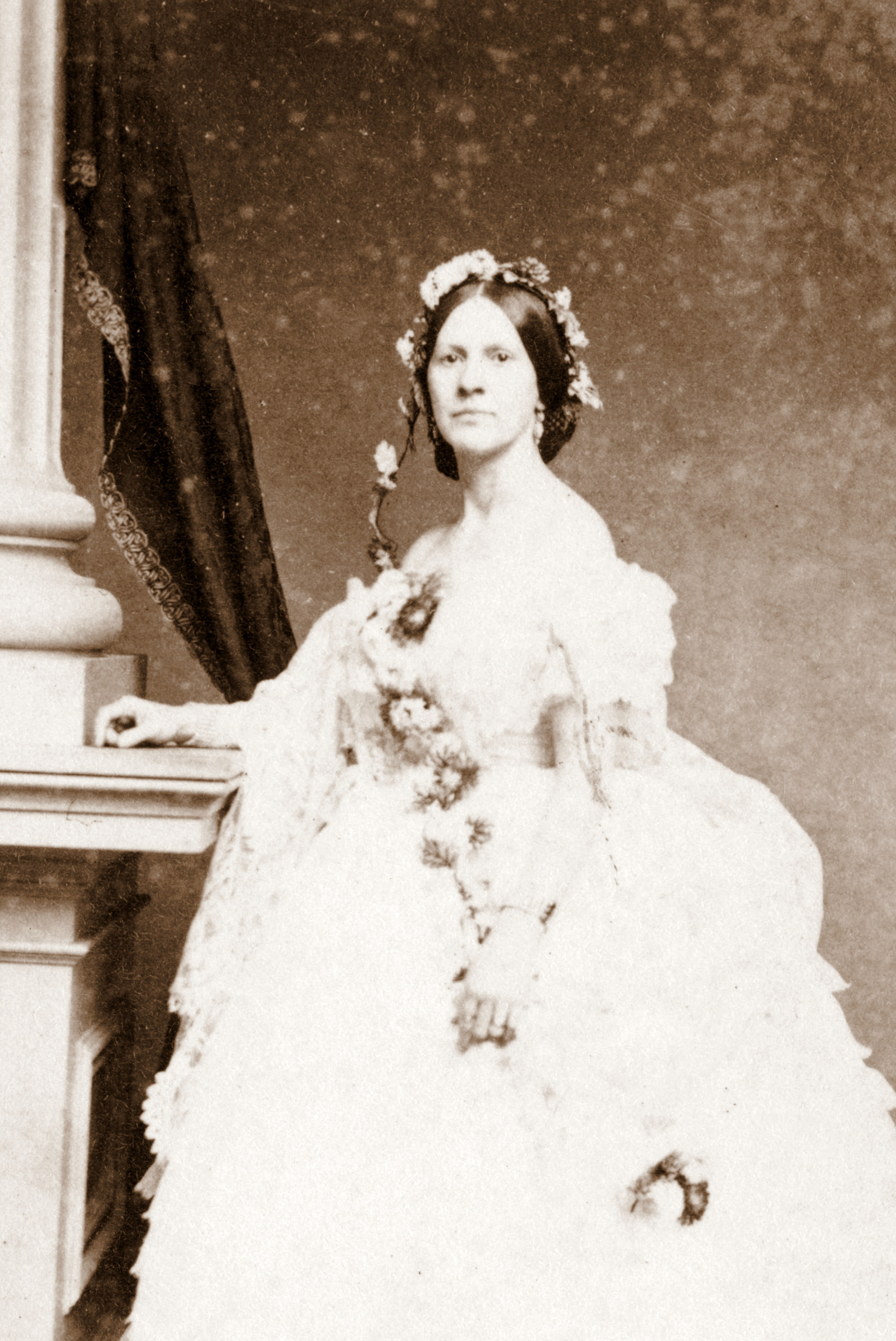
- Clay-Clopton c. 1860s
- Born: Virginia Caroline Tunstall; January 1825; Nash County, North Carolina, U.S.
- Died: June 23, 1915 (aged 90); Huntsville, Alabama, U.S.
- Resting place: Maple Hill Cemetery
- Occupations: Political hostess; activist; socialite
- Spouses: Clement Claiborne Clay (m. 1843; died 1882) David Clopton (m. 1887; died 1892)
- Children: 1

Virginia Caroline Clay-Clopton (née Tunstall; January 1825 (Note: Sources vary regarding the exact day of her birth. Ranging from January 15–17) – June 23, 1915), also known as Virginia Tunstall, Virginia Clay, and Mrs. Clement Claiborne Clay, was an American political hostess, activist, and socialite. She assumed various responsibilities after the American Civil War. As the wife of U.S. Senator Clement Claiborne Clay from Alabama, she was part of a group of young southerners who boarded together in Washington, D.C. in particular hotels. In the immediate postwar period, she worked to gain her husband's freedom from imprisonment at Fort Monroe, where Jefferson Davis, former president of the Confederate States of America, was also held.

In the late 19th century, Clay-Clopton (who remarried after her first husband died) became an activist in the United Daughters of the Confederacy, a group established after the Civil War that was instrumental in promoting the Lost Cause narrative. She worked to raise funds for Confederate cemeteries and memorials and campaigned for women's suffrage. Clay-Copton was one of several Southern women to publish her memoir at the turn of the 20th century; these women's accounts became part of the public discourse about the war. The United Daughters of the Confederacy specifically recommended her book as one of three for serious discussion by the membership.

== Early life ==
Virginia Caroline Tunstall was born in 1825 in Nash County, North Carolina. Her parents were Anne Arrington and Dr. Peyton Randolph Tunstall. She was raised by several of her mother's numerous half-siblings after her mother died when Virginia was three years old. Her father left her with her mother's family and moved to Alabama. She lived first with the Drakes in North Carolina.

At the age of six, Virginia was taken to Tuscaloosa, Alabama, where she lived with her maternal aunt and her husband Henry W. Collier, later appointed to the State Supreme Court. In 1837 he was made chief justice. More than a decade later, in 1849 he was elected by an overwhelming margin as the governor of the state, and served for two terms.

After four years, Virginia's aunt was suffering failing health. Virginia went to live with her maternal uncle, Alfred Battle, and his family on their plantation outside Tuscaloosa. Virginia was tutored but also had much time to play with her cousins and have the run of the property. During this period, she became close to her father's brother, Thomas B. Tunstall, secretary of state for Alabama, who took her under his wing, introducing her to literature, poetry and music.

With her uncle Thomas, she visited her father in Mobile, Alabama, where the two Tunstall men took Virginia to the theatre and other events. At about fifteen, she was sent to the Female Academy in Nashville, Tennessee, to finish her education at a private girls' school. As the capital, Tuscaloosa was a city of 6,000, and attracted people from all over the state, generating lively social events.

== Personal life ==
Tunstall married Clement Claiborne Clay, an attorney and young legislator, whom she had met at her uncle Henry Collier's home. They were quickly engaged after her return from the Female Academy and married a month later on February 1, 1843; she was 18 years old and he was 27. She moved with him to Huntsville, Alabama, where his family was based. In 1849, her uncle Henry Collier was elected governor of Alabama.

When her husband was elected by the legislature as a U.S. senator in 1853, Virginia Clay moved with him to Washington, D.C. On the train they met numerous other people from the state who were going to be part of Congress and the administration, forming friendships that lasted. In the capital, they were part of the political social life of the elite. That first winter, Clay gave birth to her only child, who died soon after. Within a year, she was fully participating in the many events of the city.

In rounds of dinners, Virginia Clay met other congressmen and their wives as well as members of the diplomatic corps and President Franklin Pierce's administration. During these years in Washington, she and her husband and numerous other Southerners lived at Brown's Hotel on Pennsylvania Avenue. For a couple of winters, they shifted to the Ebbitt Hotel, but returned to Brown's, where many of their friends stayed during congressional sessions. The hotel was an extension of their social life.

=== Civil War ===
When Alabama seceded from the Union, and the Clays returned to the state. Clement Claiborne Clay represented the state in the Confederate legislature, and the couple moved to the capital of Richmond, Virginia.

== Postwar years ==
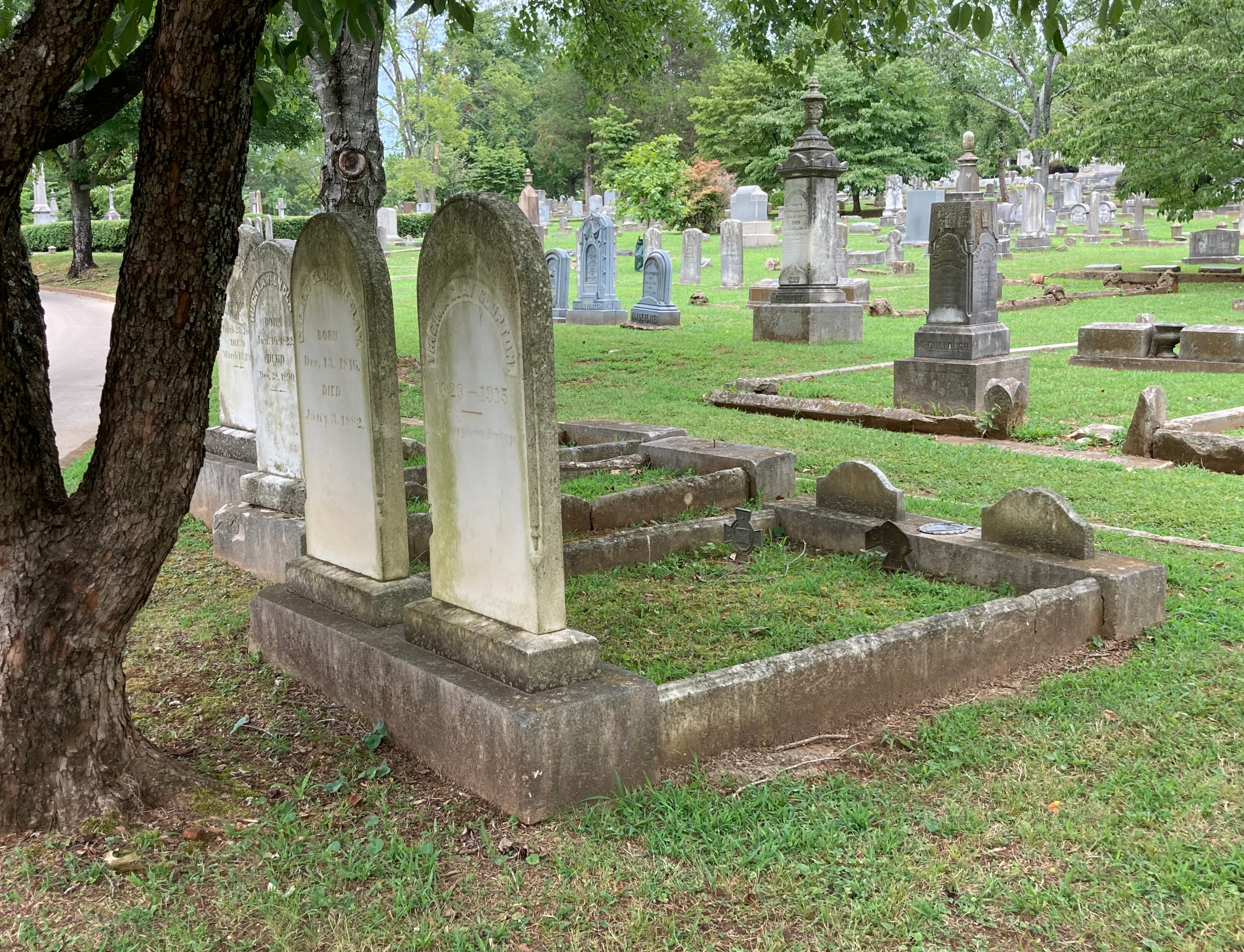
Graves of Clement Claiborne Clay and Virginia Clay-Clopton at Maple Hill Cemetery

Clement Clay and his wife Virginia were among Southerners imprisoned at Fort Monroe after the war; they were suspected of being involved in the assassination plot against President Abraham Lincoln. Also held at that prison was Jefferson Davis, their friend and former president of the Confederacy. They became even closer friends during this time. Varina Howell Davis used to visit her husband, bringing their youngest daughter. The Clays were released in 1866, but Davis was not released until 1867. The families had some continued contact after the Clays returned to Huntsville, Alabama.

About this time, Jefferson Davis is believed to have fallen in love with Virginia Clay, carrying on a passionate correspondence with her for three years. In 1871, he was reported by newspapers across the country as having been seen on a train with an unidentified woman, and the incident gained him unwanted attention.

Virginia Clay's husband Clement died in 1882. In 1887, she married Judge David Clopton, and became known as Mrs. Clay-Clopton. He died in 1892.

During these years, Virginia Clay-Clopton became active in the women's suffrage movement and the United Daughters of the Confederacy, founded in 1894. Beginning with women's groups arranging for burial and commemoration of the Confederate dead, the chapters grew rapidly into the 20th century, when membership reached into the hundreds of thousands. UDC activities and intervention into textbook content strongly shaped memory and public opinion about the Civil War.

In 1904, Clay-Clopton published a memoir titled A Belle in the Fifties, covering her life from girlhood through her confinement at Fort Monroe. It was one of three memoirs recommended by the UDC to its membership for serious study, together with those of Sara Agnes Rice Pryor and Louise Wigfall Wright.

In the postwar years, some of the early books by Southern women had been histories or biographies of historical figures, such as that by Varina Davis of her husband. The UDC encouraged women to write their own stories. Such memoirs became part of the public discourse about the war, so that women's roles and sacrifices were acknowledged. Their accounts of antebellum society became part of an idealized past. At the turn of the century, a dozen memoirs by Southern women were published.

== Death ==
Clay-Clopton died in her home in Huntsville on June 23, 1915 aged 90. She is buried in Maple Hill Cemetery in Huntsville, Alabama, near her first husband.
