= James A. Stallworth =

American politician, planter and lawyer (1822–1861)

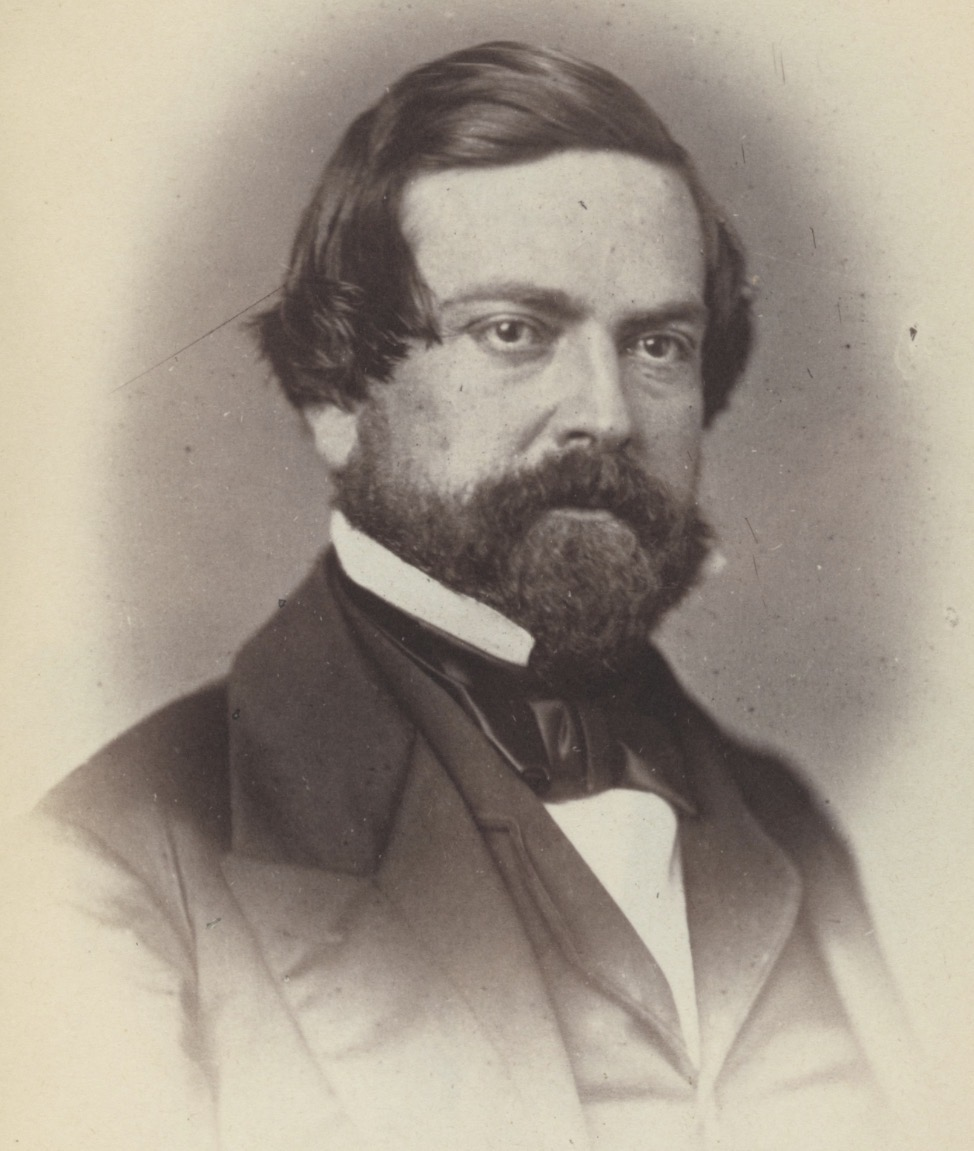
- 1859 portrait of Stallworth by Julian Vannerson

Member of the U.S. House of Representatives from Alabama's 1st district
- In office March 4, 1857 – January 12, 1861
- Preceded by: Percy Walker
- Succeeded by: District inactive

Member of the Alabama House of Representatives
- In office 1845–1848

Personal details
- Born: James Adams Stallworth; April 7, 1822 Evergreen, Conecuh County, Alabama, US
- Died: August 31, 1861 (aged 39) Evergreen, Conecuh County, Alabama, US
- Party: Democratic
- Occupation: Politician, planter, lawyer

James Adams Stallworth (April 7, 1822 – August 31, 1861) was an American politician, planter, and lawyer. A Democrat, he was a member of the United States House of Representatives from Alabama.

== Biography ==
Stallworth was born on April 7, 1822, in Evergreen, Conecuh County, Alabama. He was educated at the Old Field Piney Woods Schools, after which he became a farmer. He read law, and in 1848, was admitted to the bar, after which he began practicing in Evergreen. He owned slaves.

Stallworth was a Democrat. From 1845 to 1848, he was a member of the Alabama House of Representatives. He was solicitor of the 2nd Alabama Judicial Court in 1850 and 1855. He was an unsuccessful candidate in the 1854 United States House of Representatives election in Alabama. He was later elected to the House, serving from March 4, 1857, until resigning on January 12, 1861, representing Alabama's 1st district. Ideologically, he was liberal.

Stallworth died on August 31, 1861, age 39, near Evergreen, and was buried at Evergreen Cemetery.

U.S. House of Representatives
| Preceded by Percy Walker | Member of the U.S. House of Representatives from Alabama's 1st congressional district 1857-1861 | Succeeded by District inactive |
