= John Williams Walker =

American politician (1783–1823)

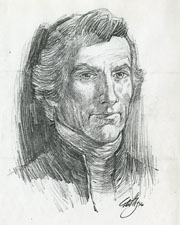

United States Senator from Alabama
- In office December 14, 1819 – December 12, 1822
- Preceded by: Office created
- Succeeded by: William Kelly

Personal details
- Born: August 12, 1783 Amelia County, Virginia, U.S.
- Died: April 23, 1823 (aged 39) Huntsville, Alabama, U.S.
- Party: Democratic-Republican

John Williams Walker (August 12, 1783 – April 23, 1823) was an American politician, who served as the Democratic-Republican United States senator from the state of Alabama, the first senator elected by that state.

== Life and career ==
Walker was born August 12, 1783, in Amelia County, Virginia, of Scots-Irish heritage, the son of Rev. Jeremiah Walker and Mary Jane Graves. He was educated at the prestigious Willington Academy of Dr. Moses Waddel near Petersburg, Georgia, and received degrees in 1806 and 1809 from Princeton University. He studied law and was admitted to the bar at Petersburg.

In 1808, Walker married Matilda Pope, daughter of LeRoy Pope and Judith Sale, and in 1810, he followed his father-in-law to settle in the new town of Huntsville, Mississippi Territory (now Alabama), and there began the practice of law.

Upon the formation of the Alabama Territory in 1817, Walker served as a representative from Madison County to the first territorial legislature in 1818. In the second session, he served as speaker. In 1819, he was president of the convention that framed Alabama's first constitution, which enabled Alabama's admission to the United States.

On October 28, 1819, Walker was elected by an almost unanimous vote of the state legislature as the first United States senator from Alabama. He served from December 14, 1819, until his resignation on December 12, 1822, on account of his failing health. He died in Huntsville on April 23, 1823, and is buried in Maple Hill Cemetery. Walker County, Alabama, established December 20, 1824, is named in his honor.

== Family ==
Walker was the father of Confederate States Secretary of War and Brigadier General LeRoy Pope Walker, Confederate Senator Richard Wilde Walker, United States Representative Percy Walker and several other children. He was also the grandfather of Alabama Supreme Court Justice and 5th U.S. Circuit Court of Appeals Federal Judge Richard Wilde Walker, Jr. and American diplomat Walker Fearn, who served as Minister to Serbia from 1885 to 1889, Romania from 1885 to 1899 and Greece from 1885 to 1889.

== Notes ==
U.S. Senate
Preceded by (none)	U.S. senator (Class 3) from Alabama; 1819–1822; Served alongside: William R. King	Succeeded by William Kelly
