= LeRoy Pope =

American lawyer (1765–1844)

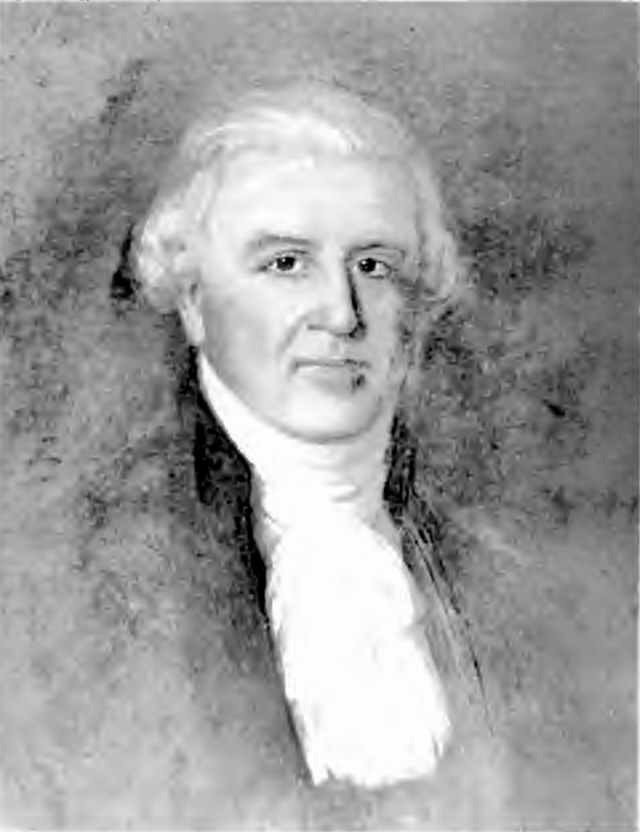
- Born: January 30, 1765; Northumberland County, Virginia
- Died: June 17, 1844 (aged 79); Huntsville, Alabama
- Resting place: Maple Hill Cemetery
- Occupation: Planter
- Spouse: Judith Sale
- Parent(s): LeRoy Pope, Sr. Elizabeth Mitchell

LeRoy Pope (January 30, 1765 – June 17, 1844) was an American planter, lawyer, and early settler of Madison County, Alabama. He purchased much of the land on which downtown Huntsville, Alabama, now stands, and for his role in the establishment and early growth of that city, has been called the "Father of Huntsville."

== Early life ==
Pope was born on January 30, 1765, in Northumberland County, Virginia, the son of LeRoy Pope, Sr. and Elizabeth Mitchell. He was educated in his home state, and moved with his parents to Amherst County, Virginia. He is said to have served in the American Revolution, and was present at the siege and battle of Yorktown, but no official documentation of this service exists.

== Moving South ==
In 1790, Pope and a host of friends and relatives removed to the town of Petersburg, in Elbert County, Georgia, where he was a tobacco planter. In 1809, was among the first wave of wealthy settlers to Madison County, Mississippi Territory (now Alabama). He acquired a large tract of land which included the highly sought-after Big Spring, where pioneer John Hunt had settled in 1805. Hunt, like many other squatters, could not afford to purchase his land.

Pope was successful in petitioning the territorial legislature to select his land as the site of Madison County's seat of government. He named the new town Twickenham after the home in England of his distant relative Alexander Pope. In 1811, the town was renamed Huntsville in honor of the pioneer Hunt.

LeRoy Pope's mansion, called Poplar Grove, was erected in 1814, in time to entertain General Andrew Jackson on his return home from the Battle of Horseshoe Bend. It was one of the earliest brick structures in Alabama, and remains a prominent Huntsville landmark atop Echols Hill in the Twickenham Historic District. It was restored in the early 21st century.

== Public life and civic leadership ==
Pope was a wealthy and successful planter, and was active in the early government and civic leadership of Huntsville and Madison County. He presided as chief justice of the first county court, and was among the founders of the first Episcopal church in Huntsville, organized in 1830. He was named by the legislature as a commissioner for the Planters' and Merchants' Bank of Huntsville, Alabama's first banking corporation, and for the Indian River Navigation Company.

He was married to Judith Sale, daughter of Cornelius Sale and Jane Dawson of Amherst County, Virginia. His daughter Matilda Pope married John Williams Walker, who became Alabama's first senator, and was the mother of LeRoy Pope Walker, Confederate secretary of war and brigadier general; Richard Wilde Walker, Confederate States senator; Percy Walker, United States representative; and several other children. Another daughter, Maria Pope, married Thomas George Percy, Sr., and was the ancestor of such notables as Senator LeRoy Percy of Mississippi, the poet William Alexander Percy, Senator Charles H. Percy of Illinois, and the author Walker Percy.

Pope died in Huntsville on June 17, 1844, and is buried in Maple Hill Cemetery.

== See also ==
- Percy family (United States)
- Cypress Land Company

== Secondary sources ==
- Owen, Thomas McAdory, History of Alabama and Dictionary of Alabama Biography. Vol. IV. Chicago: S. J. Clarke, 1921. Reprinted with an introduction by Milo B. Howard, Jr. Spartanburg, SC: Reprint Company, 1978.
- Robey, Diane, Dorothy Scott Johnson, John Rison Jones, Jr., and Frances C. Roberts. Maple Hill Cemetery: Phase One. Huntsville: Huntsville-Madison County Historical Society, 1995.
- Alabama Historical Association. "The LeRoy Pope Mansion, 1814." Historical marker. 1997.
- Le Roy Pope Obituary, - -Southern Advocate, Huntsville, June 21, 1844.
