= Marc Lacy =

American poet

Walter Marcellus Lacy, also known as Marc Lacy (born May 28, 1969) is a spoken word artist. He is the author and publisher of two books of poetry: The Looking Heart – Poetic Expressions from Within and Rock & Fire – Love Poetry from the Core.

== Early life ==
Lacy was born in Huntsville, Alabama, USA. He is the 2nd child and eldest son born to Walter and Julianne Lacy. After graduating from Alabama A&M University, Lacy worked as an engineer for several corporations and is currently a government contractor. He spent numerous years involved in organizational work and anchoring various community service projects (member: Alpha Phi Alpha fraternity, National Society of Black Engineers) within the North Alabama area.

== Career ==
In 2001, Lacy had co-founded The Legendary ArtNSoul Society of Expression. Via the local open mic circuit, Lacy transformed from a written poet, into a spoken word artist. In 2004, Lacy published his first book, The Looking Heart, and co-produced his first spoken word CD, REFlux, (Charles Owens, Touchzone Production & Publishing). Both works were the recipients of several independent publishing/performance awards. By 2007, Lacy released his second book of poetry Rock & Fire, which garnered him a nomination for "Poet of the Year" – Open Book Awards along with Nikki Giovanni. He has traveled the nation participating in various spoken word/literary endeavors.

== Discography ==
=== Albums/EPs ===
- REFlux – Poetic Spirit & Spoken Soul (2004)

=== Guest and compilation appearances ===
- "A Dead Rose" Rhonda Lawson
- "Witness the Truth Volume II" Rashad Rayford
- "Point of No Return" Elissa Gabrielle
- "Step up to the Mic" Michael J. Burt
- "Finger Lickin' Way to Fight Fat" Donna Smith
