= Margrit von Braun =

American environmental scientist and educator

- Born: May 8, 1952 (age 74); Huntsville, Alabama, United States
- Occupations: Environmental engineer, Professor (University of Idaho)

Margrit Cecile von Braun (born May 8, 1952) is an American professor emerita at the University of Idaho, retired environmental engineer, and co-founder of a non-profit, Terragraphics International Foundation. von Braun's research focuses on waste hazard management and lead concentrations within soil and soft surface materials.

== Early life and education ==
Margrit Cecile von Braun was born on May 8, 1952, in Huntsville, Alabama, to Wernher von Braun and Maria Luise Von Quistorp. Von Braun was the middle child out of the three children of Wernher and Maria. She had an elder sister, Iris Careen (born December 1948), and a younger brother, Peter Constantine (born June 1960).

As an infant (around two years old), Margrit would often accompany Maria and Irene to go to Florida for vacation while Wernher worked. Margrit's father, due to his fame and prestige, was seldom found at home, to the point where in 1958 Margrit and Irene asked Wernher to "quit rocketry and buy a drugstore so that he would come home every day". After the Juno II success in March 1959, Wernher wrote in a letter to his parents,

Huntsville has been turned upside down. Victory parade in a column of cars through the decorated city, with a band in front. Iris and Margrit sat beside me on the backseat of the open car and were completely astonished by the cheers and hoopla.

In 1959, Wernher von Braun published First Men to the Moon which advocated for space flight and was dedicated to Irene and Margrit. Growing up, Margrit played the piano and cello.

As Margrit approached her teen years, her father was even more occupied working on the Apollo program. At this point, Margrit was studying at The Westminster Schools in Atlanta. At the Westminster Schools, she met 16-year-old John Luther Adams in 1969. During this time, over weekends or on school holidays, Wernher returned home and spent time with his family, which often involved them taking down time at the lake and participating in a yearly Caribbean trip. Before the Apollo 11 flight, the von Braun family took a major trip in Europe, going to countries such as Greece and Germany. During the Apollo 11 flight, Margrit was at the Kennedy Space Center in Florida. At around 3:00 PM, July 16, 1969, after the launch, Margrit flew in a private NASA Gulfstream with the wife of aerospace engineer Ernst Stuhlinger, Irmgard Stuhlinger, back to the city of Huntsville.

Von Braun went to secondary school at the Westminster School, a prestigious boarding and day school in Atlanta, from 1967-1970. While attending, she was vice-president of the Pep Club, dormitory president, a member of Mu Alpha Theta, and inducted into the National Honor Society. After graduating, she attended Oberlin College in Ohio before transferring to University of California, Los Angeles, and then to Georgia Institute of Technology in Atlanta, Georgia. At Georgia Institute of Technology, von Braun studied bio-engineering and graduated in 1976. From 1979-1980, von Braun studied and received a masters in civil engineering from the University of Idaho. Later, from 1986-1989, she received her PhD from Washington State University in Civil and Environmental engineering. Her thesis focused on geographical information systems and their applications to hazard management.

== Career ==
=== Research areas ===
==== Geographical information systems and hazard management ====
In April 1985, von Braun presented at the 11th Annual Research Symposium at the Hazardous Waste Engineering Research Laboratory. She presented "Demonstration of a Geographic Information System For Hazardous Waste Site Analyses". This topic later became the focus of her 1989 PhD thesis.

In her 1989 thesis, she most notably looks at the potential risk of poorly stored groundwater contamination. Von Braun analyzed sites cleaned by the Comprehensive Environmental Response, Compensation, and Liability Act (CERCLA), and she created cartographic models that looked at the formation of contamination plumes at those sites and how the plumes traveled. She then looked at how the water table formed and how groundwater was managed by looking at well locations. Furthermore, she looked at how these factors contribute to the growth of the human population.

These cartographic maps were made by turning an aerial section into a matrix of rows and columns, allowing multiple maps that contained the same cells to be combined. Then, von Braun added spatial data such as water formations and human infrastructure to the adjusted maps. She then overlaid an ideal topographic map with changes to local geography and topography to prevent contamination plumes from leaking into the water table.

==== Soft surface lead analysis ====
During the 1990s, the Department of Housing and Urban Development was cracking down on lead paints. In 1993, von Braun pushed for better urban housing environments as she researched soft surface contamination. These surfaces could contain dust and soils that contain toxins such as lead in their fibers. Von Braun utilized X-ray fluorescence spectroscopy (XRF), a technique previously used to test paints and soils for lead. She wanted to see the utility of this technique on soft surfaces. Additionally, this study had significance as young children often have high exposure to soft surface items and, when teething, will often put such objects inside of their mouths. So, this study wanted to find a reliable way to test for lead contamination in soft surface materials.

The focus of the study was to determine the usefulness of XRF techniques on carpets and the lower limit of detection (LLD) on XRF technologies. To test for this, von Braun and her team created samples of carpet, each treated with a set amount of lead. They then emitted primary X-rays onto the carpet to detect lead by looking at the fluorescent X-rays. The study concluded that the amount of lead detected though XRF was within 2% of the actual amount. The study also concluded that the LLD for XRF was between 108 and 258 Pb/meter squared.

==== Environmental lead analysis ====
In the late 1990s and early 2000s, von Braun began investigating lead contamination in the Rudnaya Pristan, a village in the easternmost part of Russia. Sampling lead concentrations in residential gardens, residential yards, and roadside soils, von Braun found that children were at significant risk of lead poisoning from soil/dust ingestion. She also examined findings from three decades of research by a Russian scientific group and a collaborative US-Russian research team's initial assessment of soil metal levels in a secluded mining and smelting area of the Russian Far East (RFE). These findings point to substantial soil lead pollution and a heightened risk of childhood lead poisoning. To formulate a solution, von Braun compared the situation to the one at the Bunker Hill Superfund Site, a large complex project with a similar history of childhood lead poisoning and cleanup remediation based on explicit site factors, and proposed an action plan based on the learnings from the Bunker Hill complex. She was the lead author of a 2002 paper where she concluded that lessons from Bunker Hill can be applied to show how even severe problems can be remedied through a variety of techniques. The use of these lessons in the RFE would require strategies that are inexpensive, sustainable, and innovative.

Continuing her research, von Braun conducted studies discussing the seasonal variations of lead concentration in residential house dust throughout communities in Northern Idaho. She was the second author of a 2006 paper on the subject. The focus of the study was to investigate whether residential house dust lead concentrations in non-contaminated or "background" communities are significantly affected by these variations. The findings did not reach a concrete conclusion on the seasonality of lead levels in house dust despite recognizing the dust as a severe danger. Von Braun claims that the ambiguity surrounding this issue comes from the house dust's reliance on a plethora of erratic factors, such as weather, house age, use of leaded paint, tenant habits, and traffic frequency. These variables could be dependent or independent of the season. However, a significant discovery made by Von Braun and other researchers was that young children are the most susceptible to lead exposure and that the most frequent exposure comes from house dust.

Von Braun's work on this subject continued into the 2010s, as she contributed to a 2016 paper analyzing techniques to address the childhood lead poisoning epidemic in Zamfara, Nigeria, due to gold mining in the region. From 2010 through 2013, mining caused rampant contamination, resulting in the deaths of more than 400 children. Remediation was conducted by modifying U.S. hazardous waste removal protocols to correspond with local agricultural practices. Through these efforts, more than 27,000 cubic meters of mining waste and contamination were removed from villages and ore processing areas, and the epidemic was brought under reasonable control.

=== Corporate career ===
In 1984, von Braun and her husband, Ian von Lindern, founded TerraGraphics Environmental Engineering Inc. This firm provided geological and environmental services with a specific focus on waste hazard remediation. In 2012, von Braun and von Lindern founded Terragraphics International Foundation (TIFO) as a non-profit successor to the original company. TIFO has completed and consulted on remediation projects across four continents. They played a crucial part in the cleaning of Dakar, Senegal, from lead contamination in 2010 and the formation of an ecological park in the Dominican Republic in 2010.

=== Administrative career ===
In 1980, von Braun joined the faculty of the University of Idaho, becoming one of the first women to join their engineering department. In 1993, at the University of Idaho, von Braun founded and directed the Department of Environmental Sciences and Environmental Engineering. She held this role until 2003, when she then became the dean of the College of Graduate Studies at the University of Idaho and remained until 2011. In 1997, von Braun also helped to publish a series of tools for college professors to teach about pollution.

As of 2024, Margrit von Braun is a professor emerita at the University of Idaho. She now runs TIFO full-time with her husband. Currently, TIFO has projects spanning two continents focusing on environmental justice and hazard management but has had past projects on every continent besides Oceania and Antarctica.

=== North America ===
TIFO focuses on environmental justice and education at the Duck Valley Indian Reservation (DVIR) at the border between Nevada and Idaho in the United States of America. DVIR has a high concentration of elements like gold, which is required for low-carbon energy production. In 2023, TIFO received a $450,000 grant to assist the DVIR with governmental communication under the National Environmental Policy Act (NEPA) and in ecological strategy consulting. Currently, TIFO has assisted the DVIR by creating databases of wildlife to look at long-term patterns and has engaged the community to help negotiate proposed mines on the DVIR. TIFO has also employed a National Incident Management Strategy for Meaningful Input in Mining (NIMS4MIM).

=== Asia ===
In Karakalpakstan, Uzbekistan, TIFO has partnered with Doctors Without Borders to address the drying up of the Aral Sea rivers. TIFO and Doctors Without Borders have used environmental models to assess the best intervention and treatment plans for the region.

Since 2012, TIFO has taught a yearly course at the American University of Armenia for Master of Public Health (MPH) students.

Since 2014, TIFO has monitored tannins and other pollutants in Hazaribagh, Bangladesh, and Kamrangirchar, Bangladesh

== Recognition ==
At the University of Idaho, von Braun was the recipient of the Outstanding Faculty Award and the Graduate Teaching Excellence Award.

In 2012, von Braun was inducted as a Fellow of the Collegium Ramazzini, an academy dedicated to environmental health.
