= Confederate States Secretary of War =

Member of the Confederate States President's Cabinet

Secretary of War of the Confederate States
- Seal of the Confederate States

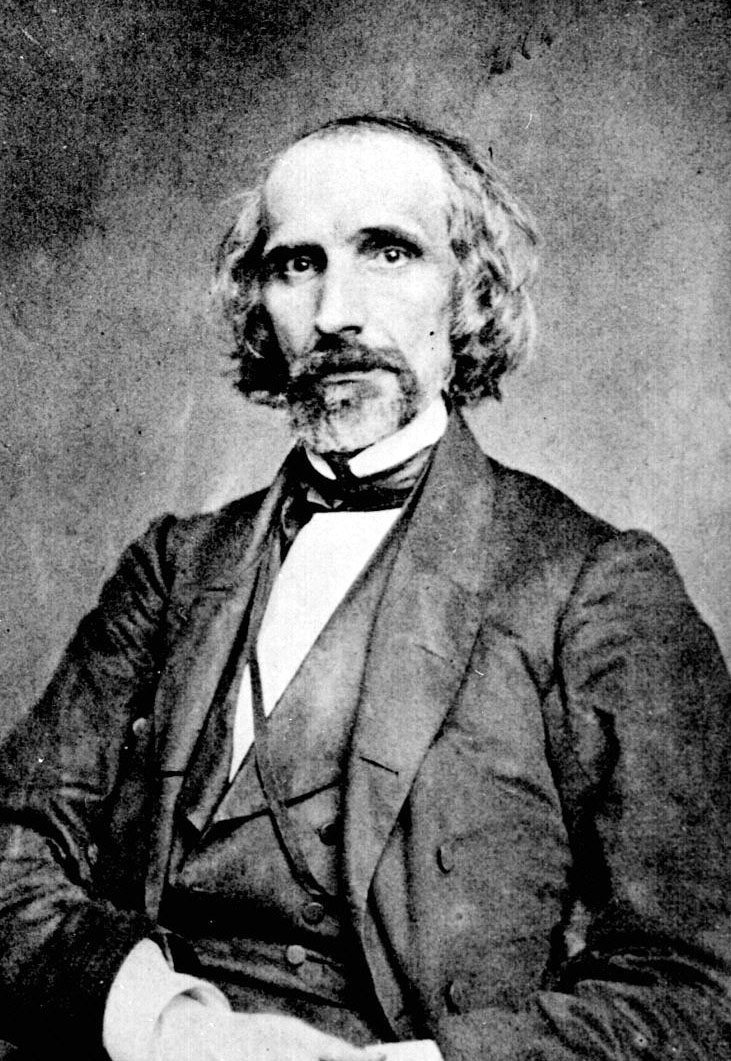
- Longest serving James Seddon; November 21, 1862 – February 5, 1865
- Confederate States War Department
- Style: Mr. Secretary
- Status: Abolished
- Member of: The Cabinet
- Reports to: The president
- Seat: Richmond, Virginia
- Appointer: The president with Senate advice and consent
- Term length: No fixed term
- Formation: February 25, 1861
- First holder: LeRoy Pope Walker
- Final holder: John C. Breckinridge
- Abolished: May 10, 1865

The Confederate States secretary of war was a member of President Jefferson Davis's cabinet during the American Civil War. The Secretary of War was head of the Confederate States Department of War. The position ended in May 1865 when the Confederacy collapsed during John C. Breckinridge's tenure of the office.

Answerable to the president, the secretary of war controlled all matters regarding the army and Indian tribes, and had the right to appoint as many clerks as it found necessary. This designation allowed the secretary of war to create what eventually became the biggest department in the Confederacy. Related to the war effort, the secretary of war managed important aspects of the war effort like medical distribution, engineering devices (pontoon bridges), prisoners of war, and fort cessions. During the war, the Confederate secretary of war’s report on the war effort became important information for the Confederate Congress and President Davis. The president had the power to appoint and fire the secretary of war for unnecessary, dishonest, and inefficient work performance. The secretary of war was also subject to impeachment proceedings from the Confederate Congress.

== Secretaries of war ==
Confederate President Jefferson Davis was the twenty-third secretary of war of the United States, serving under U.S. President Franklin Pierce from March 7, 1853, until March 4, 1857. However, he never served in this capacity in the Confederate States.

Davis appointed LeRoy Pope Walker as the first Confederate secretary of war in February 1861. Walker’s first major role involved the situation at Fort Sumter. Communicating often with P. G. T. Beauregard, he advocated for no direct clash with the Union. He also focused on the Border States, and was instrumental in ordering the muster, organization, and supply of the upper states when they seceded. His stint as secretary of war was marked by inefficiency and clashes with Davis. His lack of experience in the military field hampered his ability to manage the war effort, and he received the blame for the early supply and organizational issues of the Confederacy. In the wake of the "failure" of the Confederate Army to pursue fleeing troops after the First Battle of Bull Run, the Davis administration received much criticism, and Walker began to be criticized more. Walker resigned in September 1861 after a dispute with Davis and mounting Congressional criticism.

Davis named Judah P. Benjamin acting secretary of war the same month, and he was confirmed in November 1861. Benjamin’s addition responded to the organizational shortcomings that the War Department office was criticized for most. However, Benjamin clashed repeatedly with Confederate generals, and the downturn and increasing casualties of the war opened Benjamin up to extensive criticism. Antisemitism angled against him, a prominent and known still-practicing Jew, became a strong part of this criticism, and intensified as the war effort further diminished in the eyes of the Confederate public. Davis responded to the criticism of his trusted adviser by naming him acting secretary of state in March 1862.

Next, Davis tapped Brigadier General George W. Randolph to succeed Benjamin. Randolph placed more emphasis on organization in the Western theater of the war, and his meticulous organization and strong work ethic increased the efficiency of the War Department. However, health problems and conflict with Davis resulted in the early resignation of Randolph in November 1862. By 1862, Davis had to replace three secretaries of war.

Davis appointed James Seddon to the position of secretary of war next, and Seddon would be the Confederate official to hold the position for the longest. Seddon’s reportedly "malleable" nature as secretary of war meshed perfectly with the micromanaging nature of Davis’s interactions with the war effort. Seddon clashed repeatedly with Confederate governors, but Seddon's concurrence with Davis on the demotion of General Joseph E. Johnston caused the strongest backlash from Congress. Seddon resigned in January 1865.

With the war effort disintegrating, Davis appointed John C. Breckinridge in February 1865, three months before the surrender of the Confederate Army. Breckenridge’s strong leadership led to improvements in supply and strategy, but the dire situation made most of his contributions minimal. His most important contribution was his opposition to pursuing a “guerrilla war” to prolong the Confederacy. With the surrender of the Confederacy, Breckinridge fled the country, abdicating his post, and was the last Confederate secretary of war.

=== List ===
| No. | Portrait | Name (birth–death) | Term of office | | | | Political party (Note: While organized political parties did not exist in the Confederacy, most Confederate leaders were members of the Democratic Party before and after the American Civil War.) |
| No. | Portrait | Name (birth–death) | Took office | Left office | Reason for leaving office | Time in office | Political party |
|---|---|---|---|---|---|---|---|
| 1 | | LeRoy Pope Walker (1817–1884) | February 25, 1861 | September 16, 1861 | Health | 203 days | Democrat |
| 2 | | Judah P. Benjamin (1811–1884) | September 17, 1861 | March 24, 1862 | Appointed as Secretary of State | 188 days | Democrat |
| 3 | | George W. Randolph (1818–1867) | March 24, 1862 | November 15, 1862 | Tuberculosis | 236 days | Democrat |
| 4 | | James Seddon (1815–1880) | November 21, 1862 | February 5, 1865 | retired from politics | 2 years, 76 days | Democrat |
| 5 | | Major-General; John C. Breckinridge (1821–1875) | February 6, 1865 | May 10, 1865 | Collapse of the Confederacy | 93 days | Democrat |

== See also ==
- United States Secretary of War
