= Clement Claiborne Clay =

American politician (1816–1882)

Clement Clay
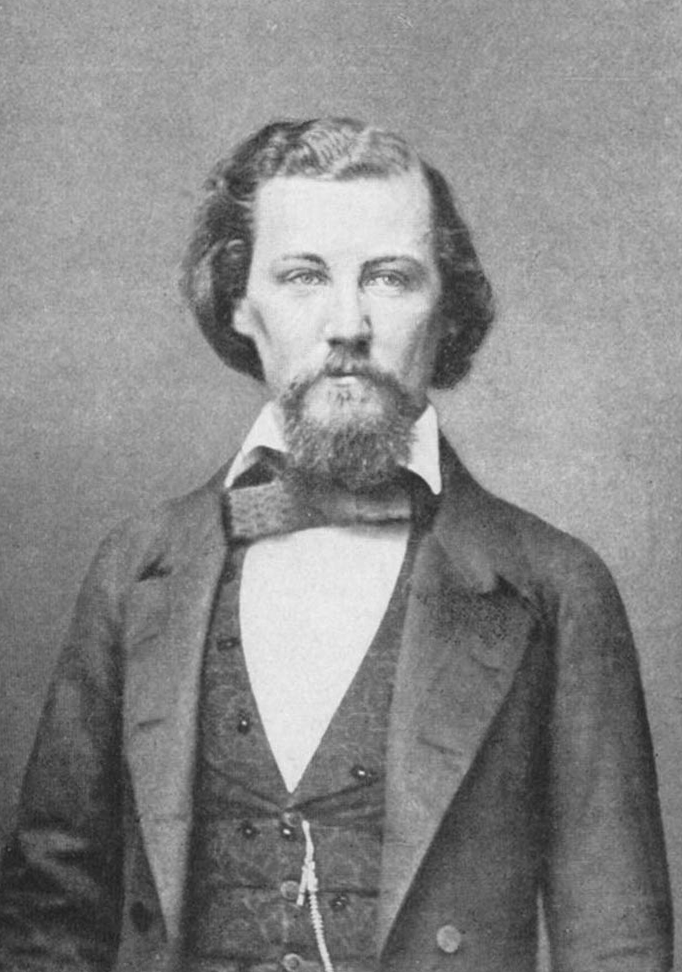

Confederate States Senator from Alabama
- In office February 18, 1862 – February 17, 1864
- Preceded by: Constituency established
- Succeeded by: Richard Walker

United States Senator from Alabama
- In office November 29, 1853 – January 21, 1861
- Preceded by: Jeremiah Clemens
- Succeeded by: Willard Warner

Personal details
- Born: Clement Claiborne Clay; December 13, 1816 Huntsville, Alabama, US
- Died: January 3, 1882 (aged 65) Gurley, Alabama, US
- Party: Democratic
- Spouse: Virginia Tunstall (m. 1843)
- Children: 1
- Education: University of Alabama, Tuscaloosa; University of Virginia
- Nickname: C. C. Clay Jr.

Clement Claiborne Clay (December 13, 1816 – January 3, 1882), also known as C. C. Clay Jr., was a United States senator from the state of Alabama from 1853 to 1861, and a Confederate States senator from Alabama from 1862 to 1864. His portrait appeared on the Confederate one-dollar note (4th issue and later). He was a member of the Democratic Party.

He and his father, who was a governor of Alabama and also a U.S. senator, were among the state's most prominent enslavers, according to the Washington Post. Together the two men enslaved 87 people on four Alabama plantations as recorded in the 1860 census.

== Early life ==
Clement Claiborne Clay was born to Clement Comer Clay and Susanna Claiborne Withers, the daughter of well-off planter John Withers, in Huntsville, Alabama. He had a strong political pedigree as the oldest son of U. S. senator and Alabama governor Clement Comer Clay. He was also a third cousin of Henry Clay, the noted statesman from Kentucky. John Withers Clay, proprietor and editor of the Huntsville Weekly Democrat, and Hugh Lawson Clay, who served in the military, were his brothers.

Clay attended the Huntsville Green Academy, then studied at the University of Alabama at Tuscaloosa in 1833–1834. In August 1834, at the age seventeen, he received an A.B. degree. He served as his father's secretary in 1835–1837 after Clement Clay, Sr. was elected as a governor of Alabama. In 1837, he and his brother John Withers Clay both entered the University of Virginia; their brother Hugh Lawson Clay joined them later. In July 1839, Clay obtained a Bachelor of Laws degree after studying with John B. Minor, known for his rigor, and was admitted to the Alabama Bar on October 2, 1839.

== Marriage and family ==
On February 1, 1843, he married Virginia Tunstall, who was then 18 years old. They had one child, who died stillborn.

After Clement's death in 1882, his widow remarried to David Clopton, a judge, and was known as Virginia Clay-Clopton. Clay-Clopton wrote Belle of the Fifties, a memoir with New York journalist Ada Sterling, published in 1904 and re-issued in 1905. Belle was one of three memoirs by southern women particularly recommended by the United Daughters of the Confederacy to its membership for studying. Clay-Clopton's book became part of the discourse about the Lost Cause and the burnished memory of the antebellum South.

== Career ==
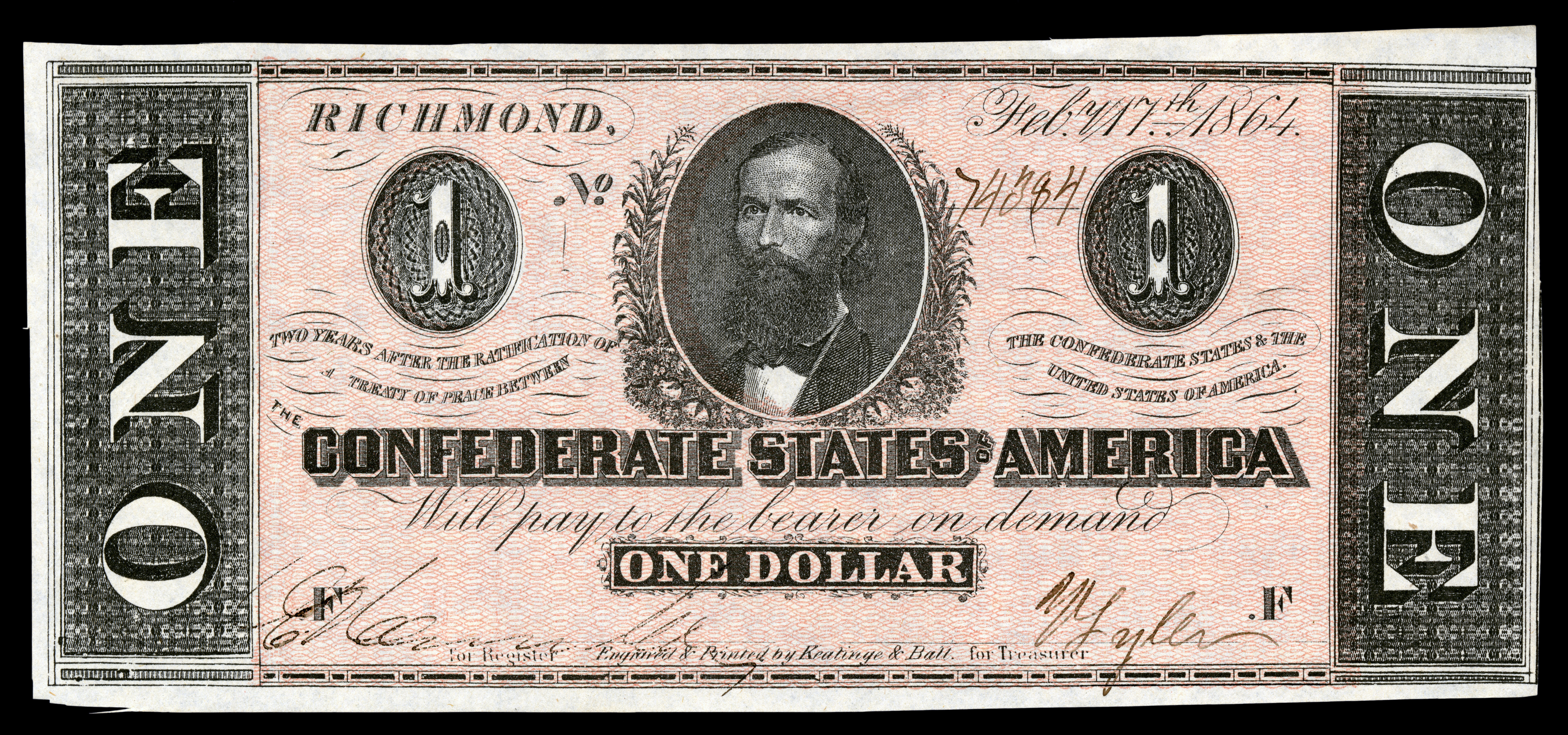
Clay depicted on a Confederate $1 banknote from 1864

In 1839–1846, Clay practiced law in a family law firm; in 1846–1848 he served as Madison County judge. Clay was a member of the Alabama State House of Representatives in 1842, and in 1844–1845. He ran for the United States Congress in 1850, but did not succeed, losing to incumbent Williamson Robert Winfield Cobb.

In 1853, Clay was elected by the Alabama legislature to serve in the United States Senate in a term beginning March 4, 1853; and was re-elected in 1857. Due to the legislature's delay in filling the position, he served from November 29, 1853, to January 21, 1861. In the Senate, he defended the state's rights during the political debates of the time, and opposed Henry Clay. After the 1860 presidential election, Alabama seceded from the Union on January 11, 1861, before the American Civil War broke out. On January 21, six men, including Clay, resigned their seats in the United States Senate. Most made brief and temperate speeches.

Clay, however, delivered an impassioned justification for secession and a denunciation of the Northern anti-slavery Republican Party. He denounced its resistance to the Fugitive Slave Act and the spread of slavery into the territories. "No sentiment is more insulting or more hostile to our domestic tranquility, to our social order, and to our social existence, than is contained in the declaration that our negroes are entitled to liberty and equality with the white man," Clay said. He described the election of Abraham Lincoln to the presidency as a hostile act against the Southern people which left them with no recourse other than secession in order to defend their liberty, honor, and safety.

Clay was subsequently elected by the Alabama Confederate legislature as senator in the First Confederate Congress. He served there from 1862 until 1864 acting as a supporter of Jefferson Davis.

Along with Jacob Thompson, Clay was a part of the Confederate War Department effort to create a network of secret agents to conduct espionage and sabotage.

In May 1864, president Davis sent Clay to Canada with a secret mission to coordinate activities of the Southern sympathizers in the Great Lakes area, including members of the Order of the Sons of Liberty and the Knights of the Golden Circle. Clay took part in a secret meeting with John Hay, President Abraham Lincoln's aide, at Niagara Falls, Canada.

It was suspected that Thompson and Clay had employed John Wilkes Booth for some services before he assassinated President Abraham Lincoln. President Andrew Johnson signed an order to arrest Clay. After learning from a newspaper that a reward was issued for his capture, Clay, who initially planned to escape to Mexico, turned himself in to General James H. Wilson in Macon, Georgia, in May 1865. He was arrested and held in Fort Monroe in Hampton, Virginia, until April 1866. Former Confederate president Jefferson Davis was also held in Fort Monroe, but was never tried; he was released in 1867.

== Postwar years and death ==
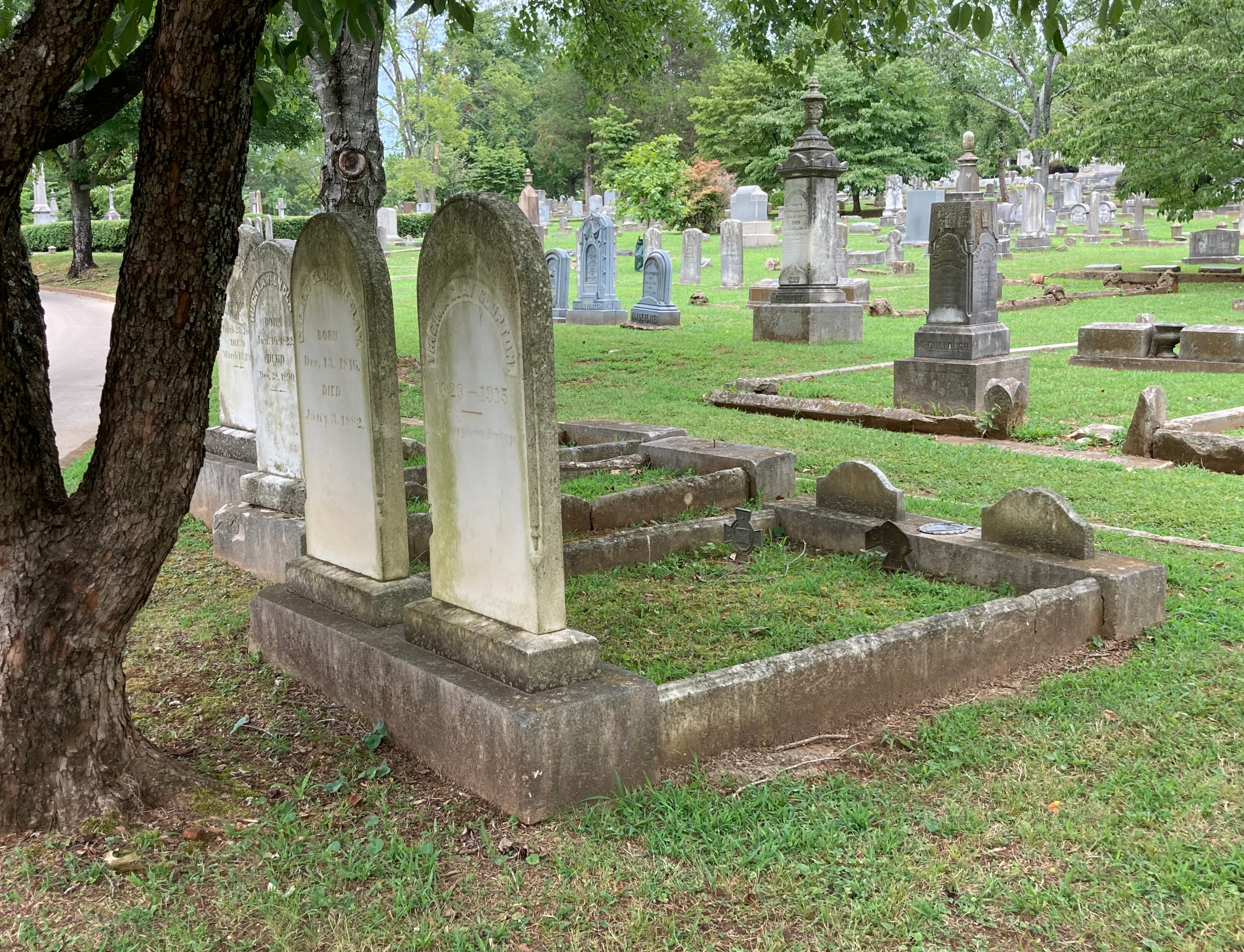
Graves of Clement Claiborne Clay and Virginia Clay-Clopton at Maple Hill Cemetery

Clay was imprisoned by the United States government under impression that he was involved in the plot to assassinate President Abraham Lincoln. Virginia Clay played some role in her husband's release as she went to Washington, D.C., and personally pleaded with President Johnson.

A viewpoint that Johnson's role in Clay's release was an act worthy of being among the charges for impeaching Johnson was voiced in the December 1867 Thomas Williams-authored majority report of House Committee on the Judiciary published at the conclusion of first impeachment inquiry against Andrew Johnson.

The Clays returned to Alabama and struggled to rebuild their lives living on a farm. Clay tried to practice as an attorney and entered insurance business in Huntsville, however without much success due to poor health, ultimately returning to his farm in January 1882. He died later that year in Madison County, besieged by debts and health problems, and is interred at Maple Hill Cemetery.

== Works ==
- Clay, C.C., and William M. K. Gwin. Invasion of Harper's Ferry: Dangers and Duties of the South. Washington: Printed at the Congressional Globe Office, 1859.
- Speech of the Hon. C.C. Clay Jr. of Alabama, on the Contest in Kansas, and the Plans and Purposes of Black Republicanism: Delivered in the United States Senate, April 21, 1856.
- Speech of C. Clay Jr. of Alabama, on the Bill to Admit Kansas: Southern Rights, How Menaced by Northern Republicanism, Delivered in United States Senate, March 19, 1858.
- Speech of Hon. C. C. Clay Jr. on slavery issues. Delivered at Huntsville, Alabama, September 5th, 1859.

== Bibliography ==
- Pollard, Edward A. (1867) [1866]. The Lost Cause: A New Southern History of the War of the Confederates: Comprising a Full and Authentic Account of the Rise and Progress of the Late Southern Confederacy – the Campaigns, Battles, Incidents, and Adventures of the Most Gigantic Struggle of the World's History. New York, NY: E.B. Treat & Co., Publishers.

U.S. Senate
Preceded by Jeremiah Clemens	United States Senator (Class 2) from Alabama; 1853–1861; Served alongside: Benjamin Fitzpatrick	Succeeded by Willard Warner^{(1)}
Confederate States Senate
New constituency	Confederate States Senator (Class 1) from Alabama; 1862–1864; Served alongside: William Yancey, Robert Jemison	Succeeded by Richard Walker
Notes and references
1. Because of Alabama's secession, the Senate seat was vacant for seven years before Warner succeeded Clay.
