= Trooper Armstrong =

Irish-American soldier and pioneer (1736–1813)

James "Trooper" Armstrong (c. 1736–September 28, 1813) was an Irish-American soldier and pioneer.

While resident in Ireland, Armstrong had been an officer of the Inniskilling Dragoons. He emigrated from Ireland before 1777, settling in Abingdon, Virginia. He served as a trustee of Abingdon between the years 1778 and 1802. He was an early settler of Knoxville, Tennessee and is credited with discovering an important spring. He was a de facto protocol officer at the 1791 Holston treaty negotiations with the Cherokee, introducing chiefs to Governor Blount.

One son, Robert Armstrong, became postmaster of Nashville and American consul at Liverpool. Another son, Francis Wells Armstrong (father of Frank Crawford Armstrong), served as a U.S. army officer from 1812 to 1817, after which he was a U.S. marshal for Alabama and an Indian agent in Indian Territory by appointment of Jackson. When Francis died in 1835, another brother, William, was appointed Indian agent in his place; William had previously served as Mayor of Nashville, Tennessee, from 1829-1833.
