= LeRoy Pope Walker =

American politician (1817–1884)

LeRoy Walker
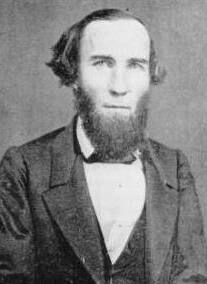

1st Confederate States Secretary of War
- In office February 25, 1861 – September 16, 1861
- President: Jefferson Davis
- Preceded by: Position established
- Succeeded by: Judah Benjamin

Personal details
- Born: February 7, 1817 Huntsville, Alabama, U.S.
- Died: August 23, 1884 (aged 67) Huntsville, Alabama, U.S.
- Party: Democratic
- Education: University of Alabama, Tuscaloosa; University of Virginia

Military service
- Allegiance: Confederate States
- Branch/service: Confederate States Army
- Years of service: 1861–1862
- Rank: Brigadier general
- Battles/wars: American Civil War

LeRoy Pope Walker (February 7, 1817 – August 23, 1884) was an Alabama legislator, judge, and the first Confederate States Secretary of War during the American Civil War. Appointed to office when the Confederacy was formed in February, 1861, Walker was blamed for logistics problems and military reversals during the early phases of the war, and he resigned in September of that year.

== Early life and career ==
Walker was born near Huntsville, Alabama in 1817, the son of US senator John Williams Walker and Matilda Pope, and a grandson of LeRoy Pope. Private tutors educated him, then he attended the University of Alabama and the University of Virginia before being admitted to the bar at age 20. He married Eliza Dickson Pickett on July 29, 1850. Elected to the Alabama Legislature in 1843 to represent Lawrence County, he was selected as speaker of the state house from 1847 to 1850. A fervent supporter of slavery and Southern secession, Walker represented Alabama at the 1850 Nashville Convention where delegates discussed leaving the Union over the growing national tension caused by the issue of slavery. From 1850 to 1853 he served as a US circuit judge, then returned to the state legislature from 1853 to 1855. While attending the 1860 Democratic National Conventions, Walker was part of the extremist pro-slavery fire-eater faction who walked out of the convention when the national party refused to commit to protecting slavery. The boycott by Southern Democrats at the convention caused Democratic support to fracture between three presidential candidates, leading to the success of the Republican candidate Abraham Lincoln in the national election.

== Wartime career ==
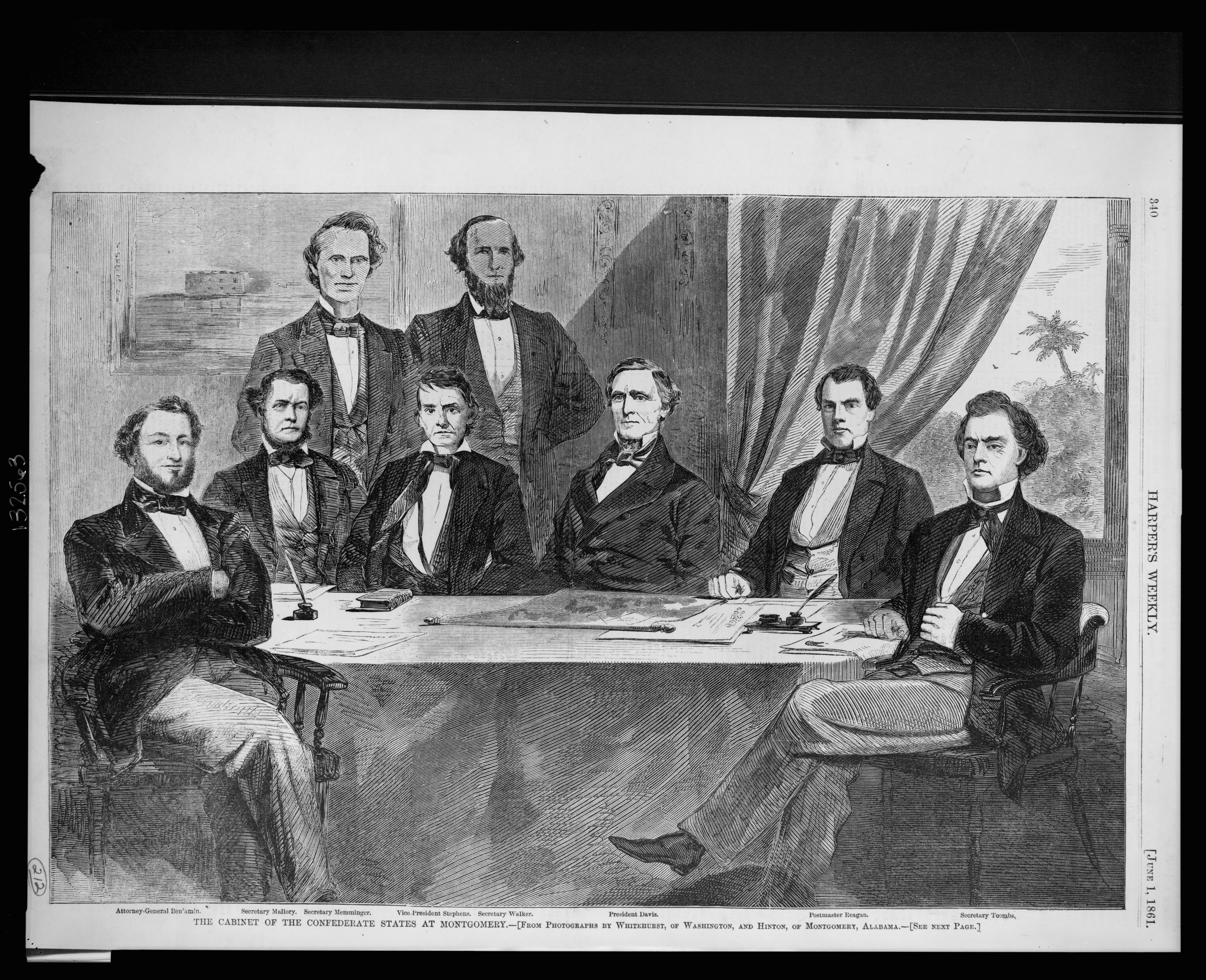
The original Confederate Cabinet. L-R: Judah P. Benjamin, Stephen Mallory, Christopher Memminger, Alexander Stephens, LeRoy Pope Walker, Jefferson Davis, John H. Reagan and Robert Toombs

Following the election of Lincoln, Walker advocated for Alabama to immediately leave the Union and prepare for war. As the state debated secession, Walker addressed his fellow white Alabamians, urging them to secede from the United States rather than tolerate the erosion of white supremacy and slavery that their social structure was based on:

"This whole subject has reached this simple proposition - shall negroes govern white men, or white men govern negroes. Remember now, that universal emancipation and universal suffrage go together. When this point is reached, and the ballot is free alike to black and white, - my God! the infamy of such a possibility...the whole social fabric of Southern civilization - the highest, best ordered, and most perfect embodiment of human government the world has ever seen will pass away forever."

— LeRoy Pope Walker, Huntsville Democrat, December 5, 1860

Alabama voted to secede on January 11, 1861, and the Southern states formed the Confederate States of America, with its capital at Montgomery, Alabama, on February 8. Largely on the advice of several of Walker's political supporters, including his brother Richard, the new Confederate President Jefferson Davis appointed Walker to the post of Secretary of War, though Walker was not personally known to Davis. He was energetic and confident in support of the Confederacy, but had no military training. The stress and difficulties of his cabinet position seriously affected Walker's health, causing him to frequently be absent from cabinet meetings.

After the Confederate Congress authorized the creation of the Confederate States Army in February, Walker became responsible for recruiting and supplying this new force. However, delays from state governors in organizing and equipping their troops made the Confederacy slow in mustering its manpower, and many governors such as Georgia's Joseph E. Brown sought to maintain troops under local control rather than turning them over to the central government. Similarly, Walker encountered difficulties convincing the governors to transfer arms captured from US arsenals to the Confederate government, or to adequately arm their volunteer troops before sending them to join the army. The South had limited manufacturing facilities, and Walker tarried in setting up local arms factories or sourcing equipment from Europe.

In the build-up to war, Southern forces isolated the federal garrison at Fort Sumter in Charleston harbor. During a Confederate cabinet meeting on April 9, Jefferson Davis' administration decided to fire upon the fort to force its surrender, and Secretary of War Walker wired instructions to P. G. T. Beauregard to proceed with a bombardment, which became the opening act of the American Civil War.

Walker was among the overconfident Southerners who at the outbreak of secession expected that there either would be no war, or that the South would claim a quick victory over the Union. Famously, Walker is claimed to have said that all the blood that would be spilled over secession could be wiped up with a pocket handkerchief. During public celebrations following the fall of Fort Sumter, Walker was widely reported to have boasted that Washington, D.C. would fall to Confederate forces by May 1, and Boston soon after. However, after the war he denied making this claim.

Following success at Charleston, Walker turned his attention towards Fort Pickens at Pensacola, Florida, and directed Confederate troops to capture the fort there. However, US forces in Pensacola were better supplied and a 15-month siege began, with the Southerners eventually abandoning their efforts to take Fort Pickens. Confederate coastal defense suffered a setback in August when Union forces captured Cape Hatteras, North Carolina. This reversal and the stalemate at Pensacola made it clear that Southern military resources were limited compared to those of the North, and sparked a panic that other areas such as the Georgia coast would be invaded.

After the jubilation surrounding early Confederate victories faded and any hopes of a speedy conclusion to the war began to seem unrealistic, Walker was blamed by Southern newspapers and politicians for the shortcomings of the War Department. By August, President Davis was dispatching orders directly to Confederate generals, bypassing Walker, and the Secretary of War gave his notice of resignation effective September 16, 1861. Judah P. Benjamin took over the position, and Walker was given a new role as a brigadier general in the Confederate Army.

== Later life ==
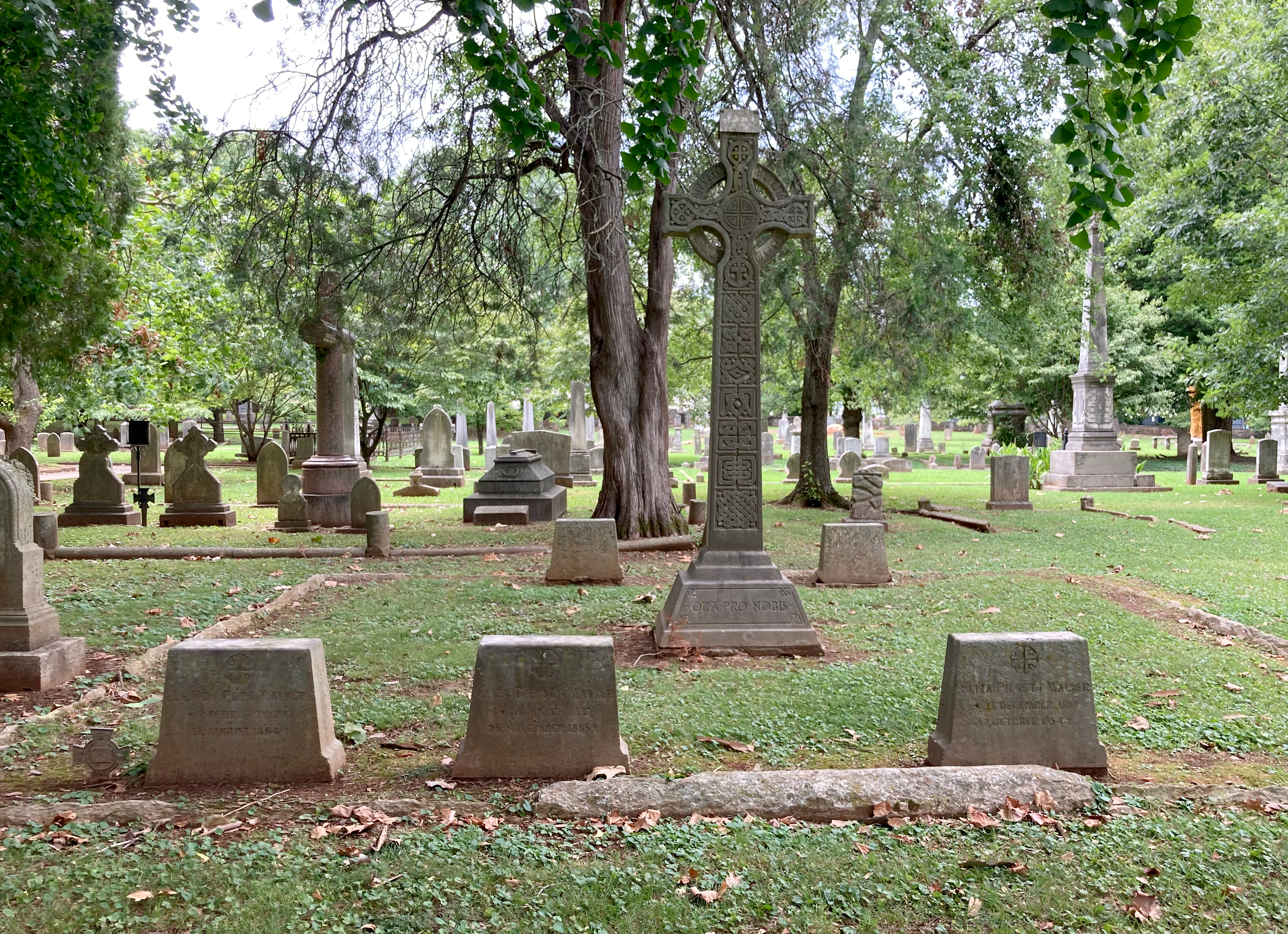
Walker's grave at Maple Hill Cemetery

Walker had initially requested to be tasked with the responsibility for guarding Mobile Bay, but his superior was General Braxton Bragg, whom Walker had fallen out with during the interminable Pensacola siege. Bragg assigned Walker to menial duties in Alabama and forced his resignation from the army in March, 1862. Walker returned to legal practice in his home region of North Alabama and served as a military judge until the end of the war in 1865. Postwar, Walker returned to legal practice, and he defended Frank James, brother of Jesse James at a trial in 1884, winning an acquittal. Although Walker was active in the local Democratic Party for the rest of his life, he never returned to elected office and died in 1884 of peritonitis.

== See also ==
- List of American Civil War generals (Confederate)

Political offices
New office	Confederate States Secretary of War; 1861	Succeeded by Judah Benjamin
