= Percy Walker =

American politician

Member of the U.S. House of Representatives from Alabama's 1st district
- In office March 4, 1855 – March 3, 1857
- Preceded by: Philip Phillips
- Succeeded by: James Adams Stallworth

Personal details
- Born: December 1812 Huntsville, Alabama
- Died: 31 December 1880 (aged 68) Mobile, Alabama
- Party: Know Nothing

Percy Walker (1812–1880) was an American politician from Huntsville, Alabama.

He was graduated from the medical department of the University of Pennsylvania at Philadelphia in 1835. He began practicing medicine in Mobile, Alabama. He served in the campaign against the Creek Indians. He studied law and was admitted to the bar. He practiced law in Mobile. He served as State's Attorney for the 6th judicial district.

He was elected to the State House of Representatives in 1839, 1847, and 1853, elected as a candidate of the American Party to the Thirty-fourth Congress (4 March 1855 – 3 March 1857). He declined to be a candidate for renomination in 1856.

He died in Mobile on 31 December 1880, and was interred in Magnolia Cemetery.

== Sources ==
- United States Congress. "Percy Walker (id: W000064)". Biographical Directory of the United States Congress.

U.S. House of Representatives
Preceded by Philip Phillips	Member of the U.S. House of Representatives from Alabama's 1st congressional district 1855-1857	Succeeded by James Adams Stallworth
