= Confederate war finance =

Means of financing American Civil War

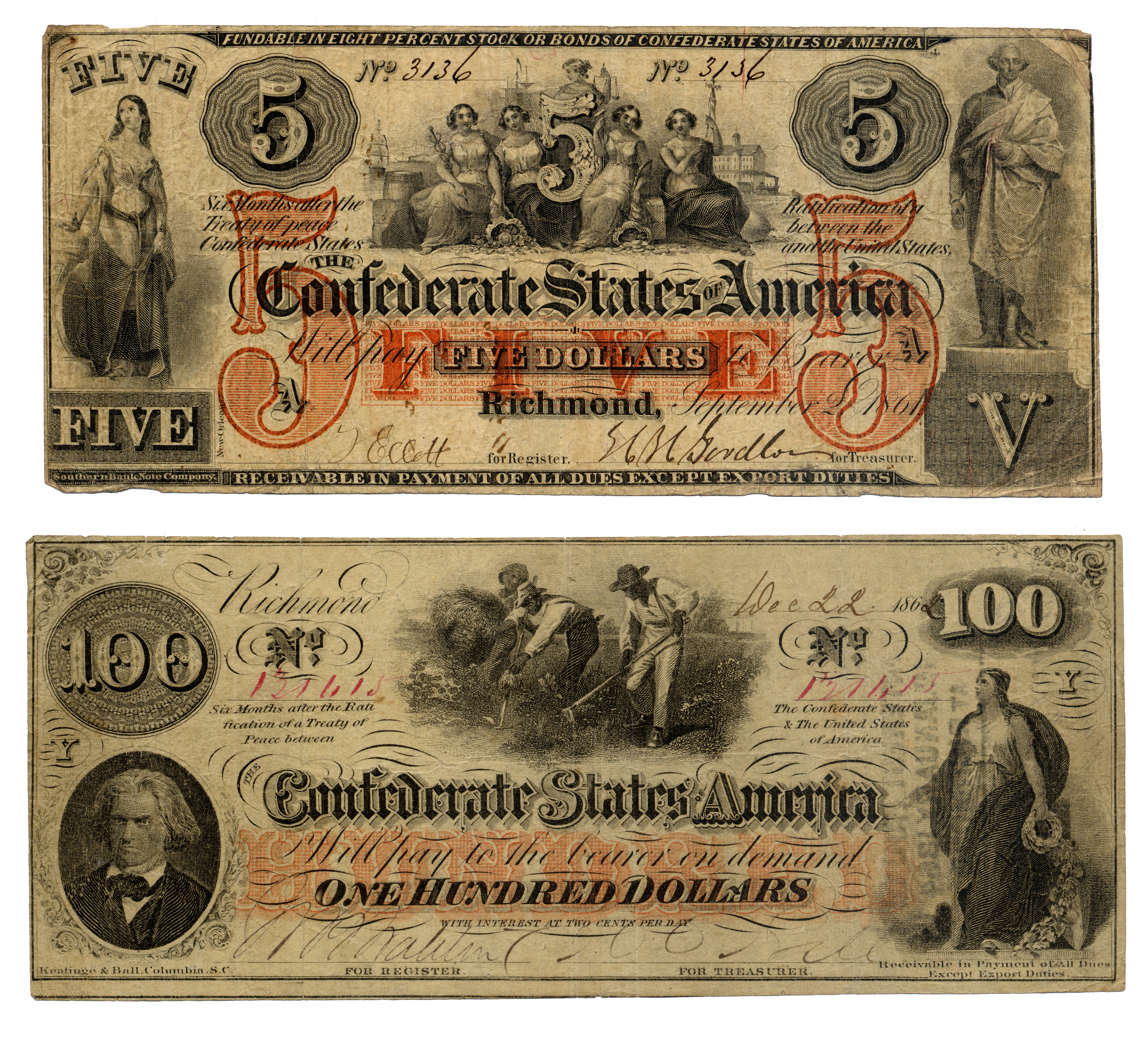
Front of Confederate notes (back was unprinted)

The Confederate States of America financed its war effort during the American Civil War through various means, fiscal and monetary. As the war lasted for nearly the entire existence of the Confederacy, military considerations dominated national finance.

Early in the war the Confederacy relied mostly on tariffs on imports and on taxes on exports to raise revenues. However, with the imposition of a voluntary self-embargo in 1861 (intended to "starve" Europe of cotton and force diplomatic recognition of the Confederacy), as well as the blockade of Southern ports, declared in April 1861 and enforced by the Union Navy, the revenue from taxes on international trade declined. Likewise, the financing obtained through early voluntary donations of coins and bullion from private individuals in support of the Confederate cause, which early on proved quite substantial, dried up by the end of 1861. As a result, the Confederate government had to resort to other means of financing its military operations. A "war-tax" was enacted but proved difficult to collect. Likewise, the appropriation of Union property in the South and the forced repudiation of debts owed by Southerners to Northerners failed to raise substantial revenue. The subsequent issuance of government debt and substantial printing of the Confederate dollars contributed to high inflation, which plagued the Confederacy until the end of the war. Military setbacks in the field also played a role by causing loss of confidence and by fueling inflationary expectations.

At the beginning of the war, the Confederate dollar cost 90 cents in gold dollars. By the war's end, its price had dropped to 1.7 cents. Overall, prices in the South increased by more than 9000% during the war, averaging about 26% a month. The Secretary of the Treasury of the Confederate States, Christopher Memminger (in office 1861–1864), was keenly aware of the economic problems posed by inflation and loss of confidence. However, political considerations limited internal taxation ability, and as long as the voluntary embargo and the Union blockade remained in place, it was impossible to find adequate alternative sources of finance.

== Tax finance ==
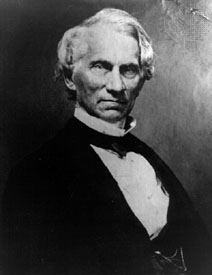
Christopher Memminger (1803–1888), the first Secretary of Treasury of the Confederate States of America

The South financed a much lower proportion of its expenditures through direct taxes than the North. The share of direct taxes in total revenue for the North was about 20%, while for the South the same share was only about 8%. Much of the reason that tax revenue did not play as large a role for the Confederacy was the individual states' opposition to a strong central government and the belief in states' rights, which precluded giving too much taxing power to the government in Richmond. Historically the states had invested little money in infrastructure or public goods. Another factor for not extending the tax system more broadly was the belief, which was present in both the North and the South, that the war would be of limited duration and so there was no compelling reason to increase the tax burden.

However, the realities of the prolonged war, the necessity of paying interest on existing debt, and the drop in revenues from other sources, forced both the central Confederate government and the individual states to agree by the middle of 1861 to an imposition of a "War Tax." Passed on August 15, 1861, the law covered property of more than $500 (Confederate) in value and several luxury items. The tax was also levied on ownership of slaves. However, the tax proved very difficult to collect. In 1862, only 5% of total revenue came from direct taxes, and it was not until 1864 that the amount reached the still-low level of 10%.

Taking account of difficulty of collection, the Confederate Congress passed a tax in kind in April 1863, which was set at one tenth of all agricultural product by state. The tax was directly tied to the provisioning of the Confederate Army, and although it also ran into some collection problems, it was mostly successful. After its implementation, it accounted for about half of total revenue if it was converted into currency equivalent.

== Monetary finance and inflation ==
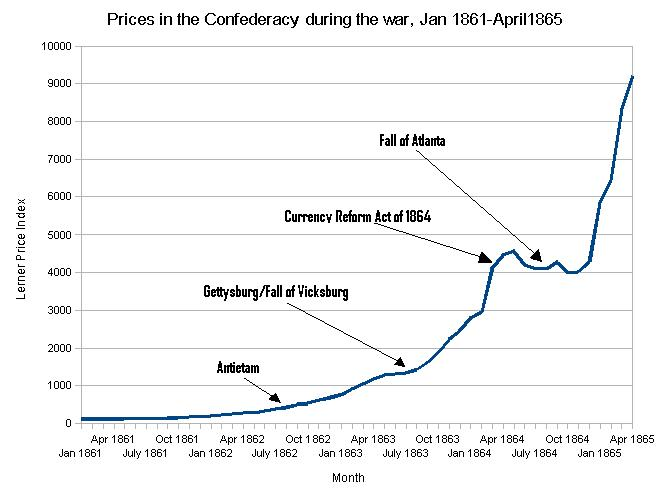
Monthly price index in the Confederacy during the war rose from 100 in January 1861 to over 9200 in April 1865. In addition to being fueled by dramatic increases in amount of money in circulation, prices also increased in response to negative news from the battlefield.

The financing of war expenditures by the means of currency issues (printing money) was by far the major avenue resorted to by the Confederate government. Between 1862 and 1865, more than 60% of total revenue was created in this way. While the North doubled its money supply during the war, the money supply in the South increased twenty times over.

The extensive reliance on the money-printing press to finance the war contributed significantly to the high inflation the South experienced over the course of the war, although fiscal matters and negative war news also played a role. Estimates of the extent of inflation vary by source, method used, estimation technique, and definition of the aggregate price level. According to a classic study by Eugene Lerner in 1956, a standard price index of commodities rose from 100 at the beginning of the war to more than 9200 by the war's de facto end in April 1865. By October 1864, the price index was at 2800, which implies that a very large portion of the rise in prices occurred in the last six months of the war. This drop in the demand for money, the corresponding increase in "velocity of money" (see next paragraph) and the resulting rapid increase in the price level has been attributed to the loss of confidence in Southern military victory or the success of the South's bid for independence.

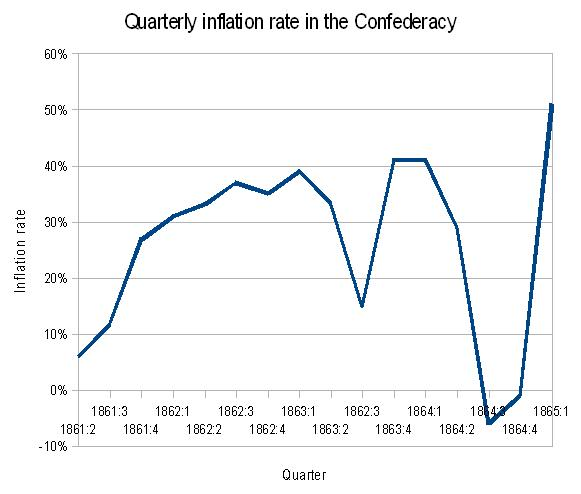
Quarterly inflation in the Confederacy during the war. Inflation is calculated as log growth rate of Lerner's price index.

Lerner used the quantity theory of money to decompose the inflation in the Confederacy during the war into that resulting from increases in money supply, changes in the velocity of money, and the change in real output of the Southern economy. According to the equation of exchange:

$MV=PY$

where M is the money supply, V is the velocity of money (related to people's demand for money), P is the price level and Y is real output. If it is assumed that real incomes remained constant in the South during the war (Lerner actually concluded that they fell by about 40%) then the equation implies that for the price level to increase 92 times in the presence of a 20 times increase in money supply, the velocity of money must have increased 4.6 times over (92/20=4.6), reflecting a very significant drop in the demand for money.

The problems of money-caused inflation were exacerbated by the influx of counterfeit bills from the North. These were plentiful because Southern "Greybacks" were fairly crude and easy to copy, as the Confederacy lacked modern printing equipment. One of the most prolific and most famous of the Northern counterfeiters was Samuel C. Upham from Philadelphia. By one calculation Upham's notes made up between 1 and 2.5 percent of all of the Confederate money supply between June 1862 and August 1863. Jefferson Davis placed a $10,000 bounty on Upham, though the "Yankee Scoundrel", as he was known in the South, evaded capture by Southern agents. Counterfeiting was a problem for the North as well, and the United States Secret Service was formed to deal with this problem.

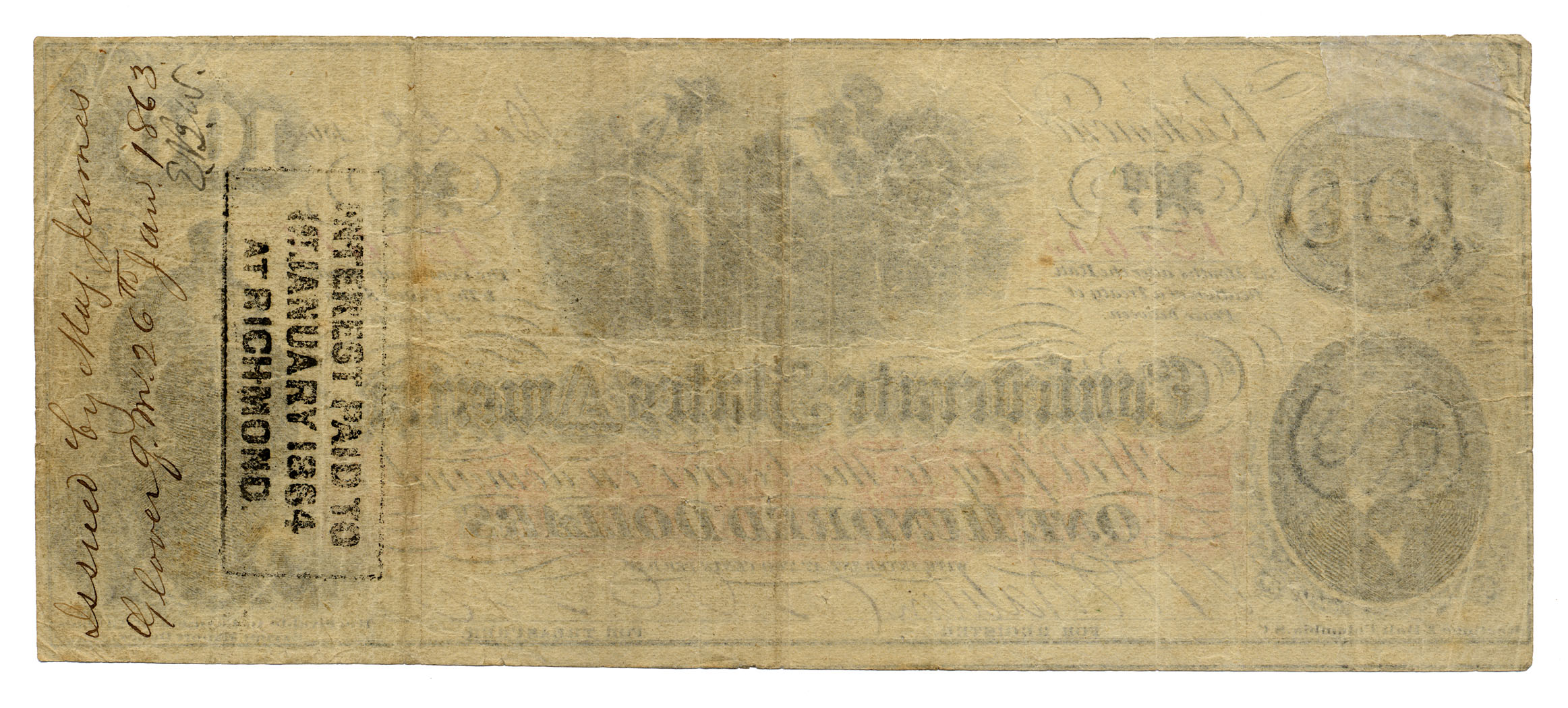
The Confederate "Greyback". Note the stamp which indicates interest paid. Interest-paying money was one of the unique aspects of Confederate public finance.

On April 1, 1864, the Currency Reform Act of 1864 went into effect. This decreased the Southern money supply by one-third. However, because of Union control of the Mississippi River, until January 1865 the law was effective only east of the Mississippi.

A fairly peculiar economic phenomenon occurred during the war in that the Confederate government issued both regular money notes and interest-bearing money. The United States also issued Interest Bearing Notes during the war that were legal tender for most financial transactions. The circulation of the interest-bearing money and the convertibility of one kind of money into the other was enforced by fiat and Southern banks were threatened with a return to the gold standard if they did not cooperate. Because of the amount of Southern debt held by foreigners, to ease currency convertibility, in 1863 the Confederate Congress decided to adopt the gold standard. But convertibility was not implemented until 1879 (the 1863 law was never implemented, as it was superseded by the Coinage Act of 1873 and the end of the Confederacy).

== Debt finance ==
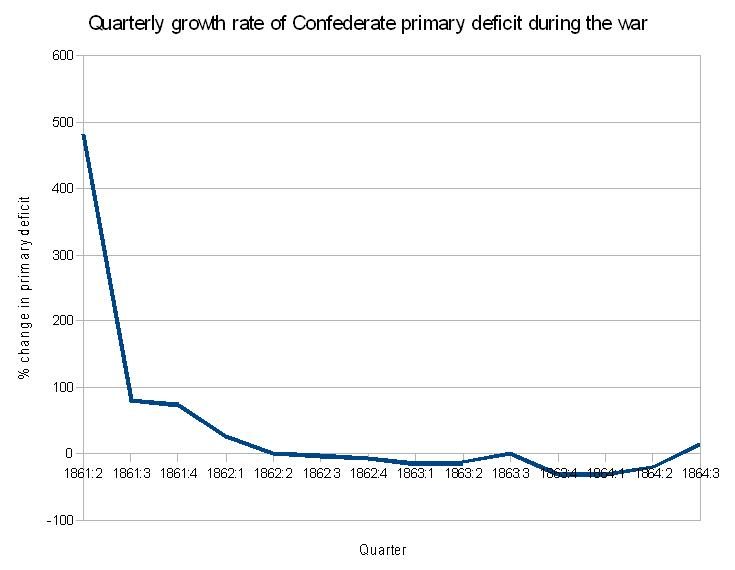
Quarterly growth rate of the Confederate primary deficit in real terms. The negative values after third quarter 1862 reflect mostly the inability to find willing purchasers for Confederate debt, as the military situation of the South deteriorated.

Issued loans accounted for roughly 21% of the finance of Confederate war expenditure. Initially the South was more successful in selling debt than the North, partially because New Orleans was a major financial center. Its financiers bought up two-fifths of a 15 million dollar loan in early 1861.

The two main types of loans issued by the South during the war were "Cotton Bonds", denominated in pounds sterling and sold in London, and high risk unbacked loans sold in the Netherlands. The Cotton Bonds were convertible directly into bales of cotton, with a caveat, included as a means of political pressure on European countries to recognize the Confederacy, that any such shipments needed to be picked up by the bondholder in one of the blockaded Southern ports (mostly New Orleans).

Cotton Bonds initially were very popular and in high demand among the British; William Ewart Gladstone, who at the time was the Chancellor of the Exchequer, was supposedly one of the buyers—his family fortune came from slavery in the West Indies. The Confederate government managed to honor the Cotton Bonds throughout the war, and in fact their price rose steeply until the fall of Atlanta to Sherman. This rise reflected both the increase in the underlying cotton prices and perhaps the possibility that George B. McClellan might get elected as US President on a peace platform. In contrast, the price of the Dutch-issued high risk loans fell throughout the war, and the South selectively defaulted on servicing these obligations.

In France vigorous fund raising yielded £3 million sterling (about $14.5m in US dollars) from the 1862 bond sale to the Erlanger bank in Paris. It was not repeated.

The main Confederacy failure was its banking on European financial support and military intervention but it proved a fallacy that "Cotton is King". Britain needed Northern grain more urgently than Southern cotton, for it had large stocks of cotton when the war began.

== Revenue from international trade ==
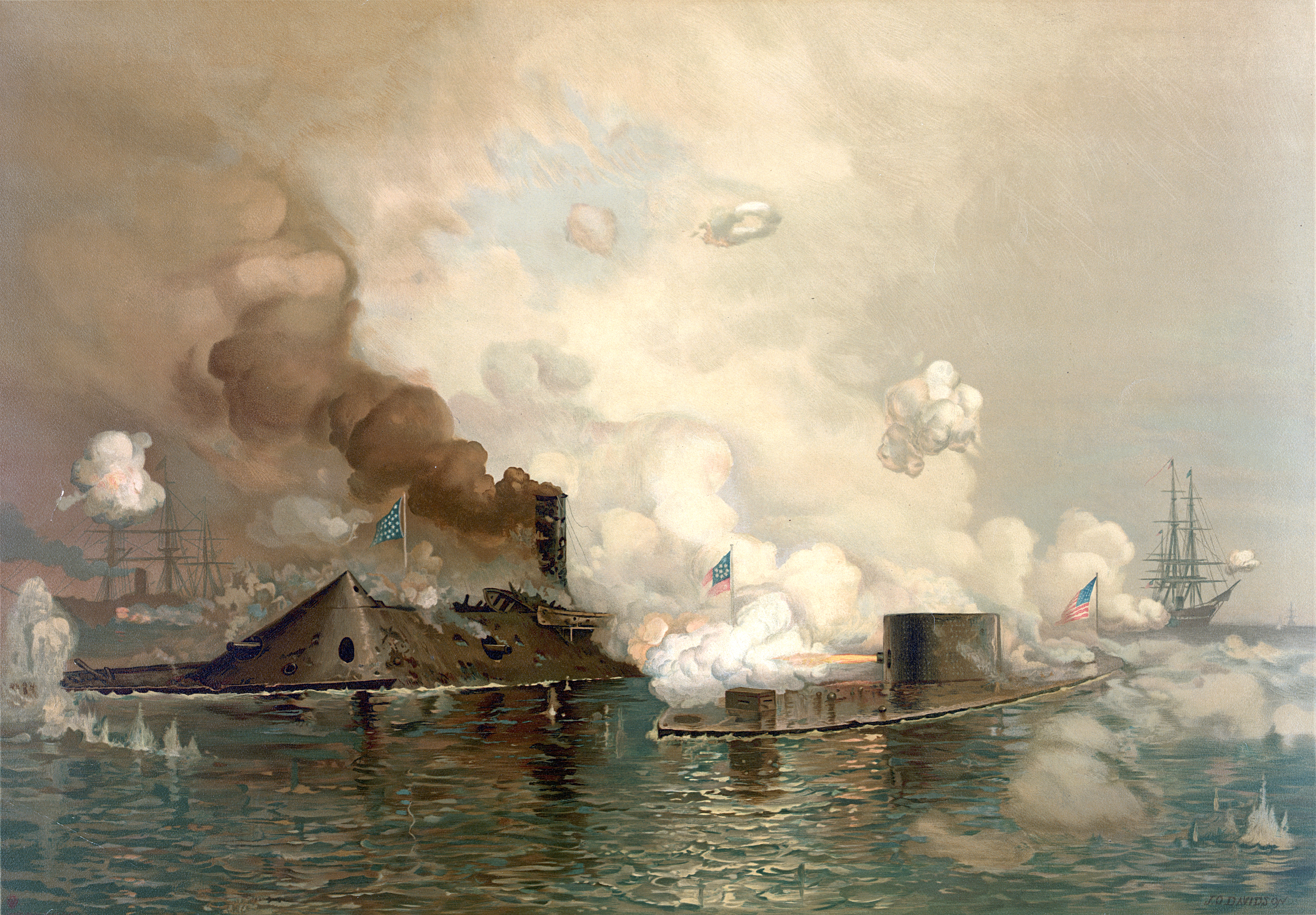
USS Monitor in action with CSS Virginia, March 9, 1862. The Union blockade seriously hampered the Confederacy's ability to raise revenue through import tariffs.

In the beginning of the war, the majority of finance for the Southern government came via duties on international trade. The import tariff, enacted in May 1861, was set at 12.5% and it roughly matched in coverage the previously existing Federal tariff, the Tariff of 1857. Between February 17 and May 1 of 1861, 65% of all government revenue was raised from the import tariff.

However, revenue from the tariffs all but disappeared after the Union imposed its blockade of Southern coasts. By November 1861 the proportion of government revenue coming from custom duties had dropped to one-half of one percent. Treasury Secretary Memminger had expected that the tariff would bring in about 25 million dollars in revenue in the first year alone. However, the total revenue raised in this way during the entire war was only about $3.4 million.

A similar source of funds was to be the tax on exports of cotton. However, in addition to the difficulties associated with the blockade, the self-imposed embargo on cotton meant that for all practical purposes the tax was completely ineffective as a fund raiser. Initial optimistic estimates of revenue to be collected through this tax ran as high as 20 million dollars, but in the end only $30,000 was collected.

== Other sources of revenue ==
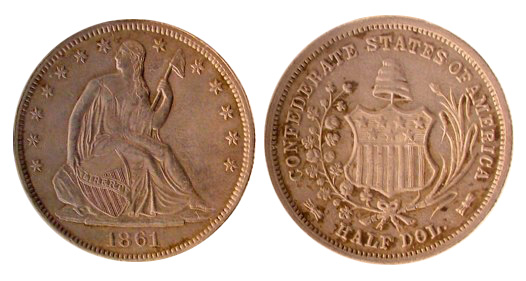
Confederate half dollar coin

The Confederate government also tried to raise revenue through unorthodox means. In the first half of 1861, when the support for secession and the military effort was running strong, the donation of coins and gold to the government accounted for about 35% of all sources of government funds. This source, however, dried up over time as individuals and institutions in the South both ran down their personal holdings of bullion and became less willing to make donations as war-weariness set in. As a consequence, by the summer of 1862, the share of government revenue coming from these donations fell to less than 1%. Over the course of the entire war, this source of revenue contributed only 0.2% of total wartime expenditure.

Another potential source of finance could be found in the property and physical capital owned by Northerners in the South, and the debts owed by individuals in a parallel manner. The Sequestration Act of 1861 provided for confiscation of all Union "lands, tenements, goods and chattels, right and credits" and the transfer of debt obligation on the part of Confederate citizens from Northern creditors directly to the Confederate government. However, many Southerners proved unwilling to transfer their debt obligations. Furthermore, what exactly constituted "Northern property" proved hard to define in practice. As a result, the share of this source of revenue in government funding never exceeded 0.34% and ultimately contributed only 0.25% to the overall financial war effort.

== Expenditures ==
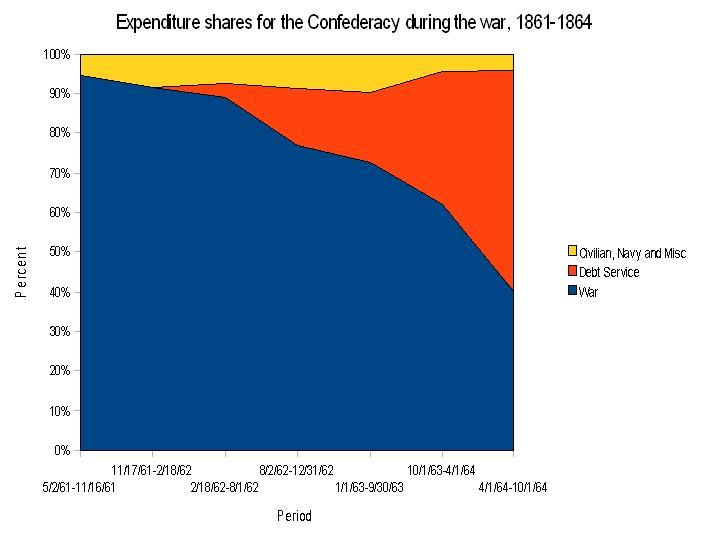
Shares of expenditures by category, 1861 to 1864.

While, unsurprisingly, military spending constituted the largest part of the national government's budget over the course of the war, over time the payment of interest and principal on acquired debt grew as a share of the Confederate government's expenditure. While initially, in early 1861, war expenditure was 95% of the budget, by October 1864 that share fell to 40%, with the majority of the rest (56% overall) being accounted for by debt service. Civilian expenditures and spending on the Navy (recorded separately from general war expenditures in Confederate records) never exceeded 10% of the budget.

== See also ==
- Economic history of the American Civil War
- Economy of the Confederate States of America
