= Economy of the Confederate States of America =

The Confederate States of America (1861–1865) started with an agrarian-based economy that relied heavily on slave-worked plantations for the production of cotton for export to Europe and to the Northern US. If classed as an independent country, the area of the Confederate States would have ranked as the fourth-richest country in the world in 1860. But, when the Union began its blockade of Confederate ports in the summer of 1861, exports of cotton fell 95% and the South had to restructure itself to emphasize the production of munitions and food for internal use.

After losing control of its main rivers and ports, the Confederacy had to depend on a delicate railroad system for transport that, with few repairs being made, no new equipment, and destructive raids, crumbled away. The financial infrastructure collapsed during the war as inflation destroyed banks and forced a move toward a barter economy for civilians. The Confederate government seized needed supplies and livestock paying with certificates that were promised to be paid off after the war, but never were. By 1865, the Confederate economy was in ruins.

== Agriculture ==
Cotton production and export from 1861 to 1865
| Sources and Ends | Bales (mil- lions) |
|---|---|
| Production | 6.8 |
| Ends | |
| Used in the South | 0.4 |
| to U.K. & Europe | 0.5 |
| to the North | 0.9 |
| Destroyed | 3.3 |
| Sold Postwar | 1.8 |

The main prewar agricultural products of the Confederate States were cotton, tobacco, and sugarcane, with hogs, cattle, grain and vegetable plots. Pre-war agricultural production estimated for the Southern states is as follows (Union states in parentheses for comparison): 1.7 million horses (3.4 million), 800,000 mules (100,000), 2.7 million dairy cows (5 million), 5 million sheep (14 million), 7 million cattle (5.4 million), 15.5 million swine (11.3 million), 187 million pounds of rice, 199 million pounds of tobacco (58 million), 5 million bales of cotton, 20 million bushels of oats (138 million bushels), 31 million bushels of wheat (114 million bushels), and 280 million bushels of corn (396 million bushels).

In 1862, there was a severe drought that, despite efforts to switch from cotton planting to grain farming, caused food shortages and even bread riots in 1863–64. The harvests were fairly abundant after 1862, but often went to waste as they could not be harvested or moved to markets. Corn was raised in large quantities, and, in general, the raising of food products instead of tobacco and cotton was a necessity.

The scarcity of food in the armies and cities was due mostly to the shortage of male labor and the disruption of transportation and finance. Compounding the problem was the ever-increasing number of refugees flooding into cities; food distribution became increasingly harder, and at times, impossible.

The progressive destruction of the Southern railroad network, along with rapid inflation, affected women in the cities especially hard as they found food prices too high to afford. In Richmond, at the end of a long supply chain, the crisis exploded in bread riots in April 1863, when a large mob of starving women in the city looted stores for food, ignoring the pleas of President Jefferson Davis who stood upon a cart to toss coins to the women, who dispersed only after he threatened to order a company of militia to open fire. In dozens of small towns across Georgia in 1863, working-class women raided stores and captured supply wagons to get such necessities as bacon, corn, flour, and cotton yarn. Soldiers at the front did not need to read newspaper accounts, as letters from home informed them of the rapidly deteriorating situation of their own families. Temporary desertion was one solution as "thousands of husbands discharged themselves" to save their families over the course of the war.

Despite the Confederacy's strength in cotton production, it produced too little cloth to cover its ragged soldiers. Northern manufacturers dominated North American textile production in the antebellum period, and by the end of the first year of war most of the productive textile manufacturing regions of the South were also in the hands of the Union.

== Urbanization ==
The Confederacy had very few cities of any size. Using figures from the 1860 census, New Orleans was the largest city under Confederate control. It was the sixth-largest city listed in the census with a population of about one hundred and sixty thousand. New Orleans and its industrial capacity fell to the Union after only 455 days. The next largest city in the Confederacy was Charleston, South Carolina, with only forty thousand and ranked twenty-second in the United States. Richmond, the capital and the industrial center of the Confederacy, was twenty-fifth.

During the war, Columbus, Georgia became one of the most important centers of industry in the Confederacy, ranked second to Richmond in the manufacture of supplies for the Confederate army.

== Manufacturing ==
The Confederacy's industrial workforce, like its agricultural workforce, was characterized by its wide and extensive use of slaves. In the 1850s, anywhere from 150,000 to 200,000 slaves were used in industrial work. Most, almost 80%, were owned directly by industrial owners, with the remainder being bonded out by plantation owners. Often, manual labor performed by slaves was combined with skilled white artisans to better compete with northern and foreign industry.

The total number of factories in the antebellum South numbered 20,600 (100,500 in the north), 11,000 non-slave workers (1.1 million in the north) and a total value of products amounting to $155 million ($1.5 billion in the northern states).

Because of the profitability of slave industry, Southern industry had been undercapitalized for years by the time of the outbreak of the war. Besides a social preference for the lifestyle that accompanied plantation slavery, agriculture in staple goods was considered the easiest route to profitability; thus agriculture always outbid industry when it came to capital allocation. As early as 1830, Southern industry was a generation behind, and by the Civil War, was vastly inferior to Northern and foreign manufacturing. When the war turned negative, many industries in the South struggled as they faced steadily growing shortages of raw materials and skilled labor, as well as worsening financial opportunities.

In Wilmington, North Carolina, Louis Froelich (1817–1873), a German immigrant, opened the Confederate States Arms Factory. His firm made bayonets, sabers, Bowie knives, and sheathes or scabbards for these weapons, as well as thousands of metal buttons for military uniforms.

=== Shipbuilding ===
At the outset of hostilities, only two government-owned naval yards were located in the South. Between 36 and 145 private shipyards existed, of varying capacity and skill. While sawmills were readily available to supply the construction of wooden boats, iron processing in the South was limited. The result was that few ships were built. The most famous was the CSS Virginia, a steam-powered ironclad warship built in 1861-62 using the raised and cut down original lower hull and steam engines of the scuttled USS Merrimack. Virginia fought in the Battle of Hampton Roads against the Union's USS Monitor in March, 1862, in what was the world's first battle between ironclads.

=== Iron industry ===
The Tredegar Iron Works in Richmond was the third-largest iron manufacturer in the United States by 1860. During the war it was the primary iron and artillery production facility of the Confederacy.

Birmingham, Alabama, although an important industrial center of the South after the war, did not produce iron until 1864. Production from this region was minor throughout the war.

=== Gallego Flour Mills ===
The Gallego Flour Mills in Richmond gained international reputation for the superior type of flour which it shipped to Europe and South America. At the time of their destruction in 1865, they were the largest of their kind in the world.

=== Mining and natural resources ===
Salt was a crucial resource during the Civil War. Salt not only preserved food in the days before refrigeration, but was also vital in the curing of leather. The salt could be extracted from natural rock salt deposits (such as those in underground salt domes) and through the boiling and evaporation of salt water, usually seawater. The main salt works and known natural salt deposits of the Confederacy were located in Virginia, Louisiana, and Florida.

=== Textiles ===
Early in the war, the government used cottage and home-based industry to manufacture textiles such as shirts and shoes. Finding this approach inadequate, the government moved to consolidate finished-goods production into military-run textile shops concentrated in larger cities. These textile shops, with the exception of those captured or destroyed, continued to run until the end of the war. Private mills generally supplied raw textiles to these shops for refinement.

Privately owned textile mills found themselves in a very lucrative market. Rising prices due to scarcity and high levels of demand made sales to the public far more profitable than fixed-price contract sales to the military, so much so that in the first year private mills often refused or cut back on fulfillments ordered by Confederate quartermasters.

=== Government control ===
The only manufactures over which the confederate government sought control were those which directly supplied the needs of the army. These were two classes: (1)arms and munitions, which were under the charge of the ordnance bureau; and (2) a more diverse group which included clothing, blankets, tents, shoes, wagons, saddles, and harness, which for the most part were provided by the quartermaster's bureau.

— Charles W. Ramsdell

While the general political sentiment in the Confederacy was reluctance toward government involvement in private business, the exigencies of the war forced the Confederate government to exert a strong control over industry related to war aims. The bureau of conscription, empowered by the Conscription Acts of 1862 and 1864, dispensed exemptions to those in industry, if necessary, which provided a powerful incentive to private industry to fulfill government contracts. Owners who refused would find themselves quickly without their labor force, free or slave.

==== Business leaders ====
- William Gregg (industrialist)
- Samuel Griswold
- Hannibal Kimball
- Samuel Morgan
- John L. Porter
- Francis A. Pratt
- William T. Sutherlin

== Transportation ==
=== Navigation ===
Before the war the South had a good system of transportation by riverboats on a huge network of navigable rivers, plus a dozen ocean ports. In May 1861 the Union naval blockade shut down almost all port activity except for blockade runners. International and coastal traffic fell 90% or more. In peacetime, the vast system of navigable rivers allowed for cheap and easy transportation of farm products. The vast geography made for difficult Union logistics, and Union soldiers were used to garrison captured areas and protect rail lines. But the Union Navy seized most of the navigable rivers by 1862, making its own logistics easy and Confederate movements difficult. After the fall of Vicksburg in July 1863, it became nearly impossible for all but small military units to cross the Mississippi with Union gunboats constantly on patrol. The Eastern and Western parts of the Confederacy were thereafter never satisfactorily connected.

=== Railroads ===
The outbreak of war had a depressing effect on the economic fortunes of the Confederate railroad industry. With the cotton crop being hoarded in an attempt to entice European intervention, railroads were bereft of their main source of income. Many were forced to lay off employees, and in particular, let go skilled technicians and engineers. For the early years of the war, the Confederate government had a hands off approach to the railroads. It wasn't until mid-1863 that the Confederate government initiated an overall policy, and it was confined solely to aiding the war effort. With legislation authorizing "impressment" (commandeering) that same year, railroads and their rolling stock came under de facto control of the military.

At the beginning of the war (1861), the Northern states included 20,000 miles of railroad while the Confederate states had 9,000 miles (1,700 miles total in the three border states of Missouri, Kentucky and Maryland).

The Confederate Army of the Shenandoah used their railroad system effectively at the First Battle of Manassas (Bull Run) on July 21, 1861. Confederate reinforcements under Brig. Gen. Joseph E. Johnston arrived from the Shenandoah Valley by railroad and the course of the battle quickly changed.

Gen. Braxton Bragg also effectively used the Southern railway system to amass forces in central Tennessee against the Union forces of Gen. Don Carlos Buell in July, 1862. The rail system was used to move some 35,000 men down the length of the state of Mississippi, then across Mobile Bay to Mobile, Alabama and then up the length of the state of Alabama arriving finally at Dalton, Georgia. This was a total distance of about 766 miles and involved "more than half a dozen" railroads. This circuitous route had to be used because the Union Army controlled a key railroad which would have offered a more direct route. According to Jean Edward Smith, "Bragg had moved men farther and faster than troops had ever been moved before. He had united two Confederate armies, his own and Smith's [Gen. Edmund Kirby Smith] and stood poised to change the direction of the war."

In the fall of 1863 the Army of Northern Virginia sent most of Gen. James Longstreet's First Corps, Army of Northern Virginia via rail from Virginia to northern Georgia in order to reinforce Gen. Bragg's Army of Tennessee just prior to the Battle of Chickamauga. Approximately 15,000 men were transported about 900 miles to the Georgia theater of operations. This operation involved sixteen different railroads and took a total of seven days (9–16 September) for the entire corps to arrive in Georgia.

In the last year of the war (1865), the Confederate railroad system was on the verge of collapse. The impressment policy of quartermasters ran the rails ragged. Feeder lines were scrapped to replace iron for trunk lines, and the continual use of ill-maintained rolling stock wore them down faster than they could be replaced.

== Foreign trade ==
=== Export ===
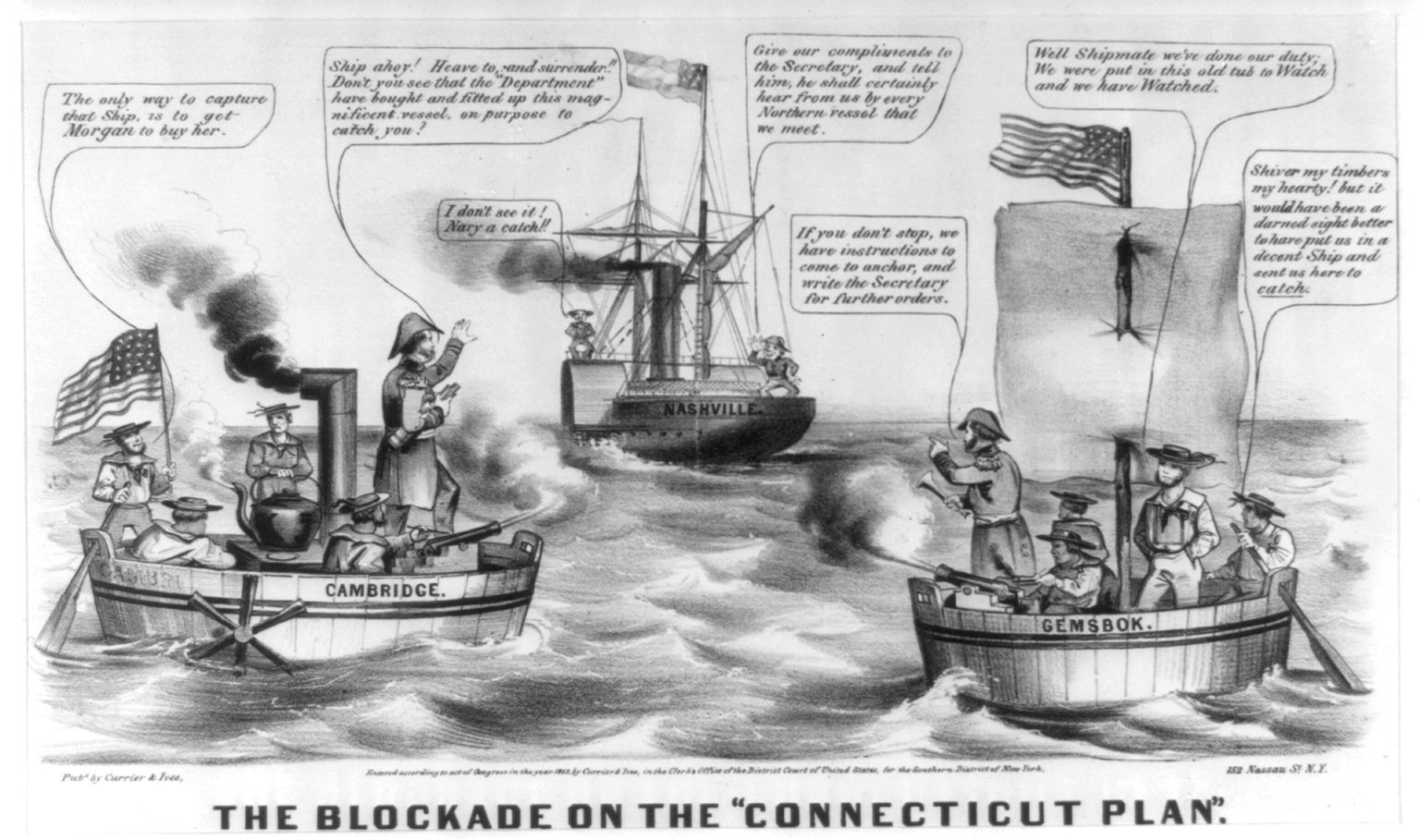
Cartoon mocking the initially ineffective attempts of the North to blockade the Confederacy

The Confederate States accounted for 70% of total US exports by dollar value. Confederate leaders believed that this would give the new nation a firm financial basis. Cotton was the primary export, accounting for 75% of Southern trade in 1860. The Confederate States entered the war with the hope that its near monopoly of the world cotton trade would force the European importing countries, especially Great Britain and France, to intervene in the war on her behalf. In 1861, Southerners at the local level imposed a "King Cotton" embargo on cotton shipments—it was not the government's policy. Millions of bales of cotton went unshipped, and by summer 1861 the blockade, known as the Anaconda Plan, closed down all normal trade.

A small amount of cotton was exported through blockade runners. In the course of the war, 446,000 bales of cotton were exported to England and Europe. Ironically, the largest amount of cotton exports went to the United States. Most cotton however, would never be traded during the Confederacy's brief existence, either being destroyed during the war or hoarded until the end.

Disputes over the proper tariff rate had been a sectional political issue between Northern and Southern states at one point almost leading to a prior dissolution of the Union. Southerners mostly opposed protectionist tariffs for finished goods, fearing they would lessen the value of their raw material exports, as foreign manufactures would be blocked sale back to the United States. Southern political pressure kept the tariffs at low levels from 1847 through 1860. The founders of the Confederate States codified this opposition in the Constitution of the Confederate States with a prohibition of protectionist tariffs. One of the first acts of the Confederate Congress was the lowering of import tariffs from the then current US average rate of 20% to 10%.

However the Confederacy proposed to impose its tariffs on all imports from the US, which would have been a vast increase in taxes for the Southerners. In practice almost no tariffs were collected; the total customs revenue collected was about $3.3 million (Confederate dollars), from 1861 through 1864. [Historical Statistics (2006) series Eh201]

=== Import ===
...the seceded South, even before the outbreak of hostilities, was faced with the necessity of securing the basic materials of war. It lacked guns, cannon, and munitions of every sort; it lacked most of the raw materials from which they could be manufactured. The South needed clothing, medicine, tools, and, later on, food. It lacked the factories, too, with which to manufacture the sinews of war, and the machinery and skilled labor with which to establish and run factories. As a result the Confederacy, at the very start, turned it eyes towards Europe.

— William Diamond

Just as the blockade had made export of Confederate goods prohibitive, so did it frustrate the importation of vital goods to the Confederate war-effort. Importers often had to use transshipment points, such as ports in the Caribbean, transferring and splitting cargo onto smaller ships for the final leg. Thus shipments became sporadic and delayed.

In the immediate aftermath of Fort Sumter, agents, headed by Major Caleb Huse, were sent abroad to Europe to procure weapons and other necessary supplies. Despite these efforts, the first shipment did not leave England until August, and didn't arrive in the South till November, a full 8 months after the outbreak of hostilities. The slow rate of importation continued from September 1861 to February 1862, with a grand total of 15,000 small arms procured for the Confederate's war effort.

After February, the Confederacy's fortunes in weapons procurement changed dramatically. From April 1862 till August of that year, the Confederacy was able to procure some 48,150 arms, over three times the amount gained in the same period the year before. By February 1863, the total number of guns purchased had raised to a total of 174,129. While some of these weapons were seized by the Union Navy in the blockade, a slight majority made it through, with 40.9% of all privateers being caught in 1862.

The South acquired raw minerals through trade with Mexico, most notably sulphur, copper, powder, and niter. Union officials recognized the extent of trade with Mexico, and aggressively tried to interrupt it. Despite their efforts, and the fall of the Mississippi into Union hands, flow of goods from Mexico to the Confederacy was unabated until the end of the war.

While attempts were made to engage shipbuilders on the Pacific coast, in an attempt to access ports in South America, none of the plans came to fruition. Only the Confederate steamer, the Alabama, after finding the Atlantic too hostile, set sail for Pacific waters in an attempt to wreck America's Far-East trade. Though it succeeded in its mission to harass American trade interests, it did not manage to open new ports or engage in trade for the Confederacy, and it was sunk before it could return home with its captured goods.

Blockade runners who sold to the public dealt almost exclusively in luxury and other high-profit items, despite the ever-present need for staple goods. The practice was so egregious that the Confederate Congress came to ban the import of luxury items, though the law was not effectively enforced. Smuggling over land, from either Mexico or Union territory, also provided a profitable trade in luxury items, though it also became a useful means of acquiring much-needed medicine.

== Finance ==
Most of the available capital in the Confederate states was invested in slaves or in cotton land. There was no way to monetize these to support the war effort. The weak banking system, unable to handle the financial demands, largely collapsed. The main international bankers in Europe were reluctant to finance the Confederacy, so Richmond turned to smaller houses and speculators, who bought $15,000,000 in Confederate bonds with gold. The gold was used to buy warships and supplies to be brought in by blockade runners. By highlighting Britain's economic links to the Northern states and pointing to the potential dangers of meddling in the conflict, financiers in the City of London provided the U.K. Parliament with a powerful economic justification for the policy of neutrality.

At the beginning of the war the Confederacy had some $47 million in bank deposits (compared to $189 million in Northern banks), and $27 million in specie (gold and silver coins) holdings (compared to $45 million worth in the northern states).

=== Money ===
Bad money drives out good, and supplies of gold and silver were hoarded, driven out of circulation by the rising flood of paper money. The first Confederate notes were issued in March 1861, and bore interest. They were soon followed by others, bearing no interest and payable in two years, others payable six months after peace. New issues were continually provided, so that from an initial million dollars in circulation in July 1861, the amount rose to thirty million before December 1861; to one-hundred million by March 1862; to two-hundred million by August 1862; to perhaps four-hundred and fifty million dollars by December 1862; to seven-hundred million dollars by the autumn of 1863; and to a much larger figure before the end of the war.

The individual states and other political bodies copied this policy of issuing irredeemable paper money. Alabama began by issuing a million dollars in notes in February 1861, and added to this amount during each subsequent session of the legislature. The other states followed suit. Cities also sought to replenish their treasuries in the same way. Corporations and other business concerns tried to meet the rising tide of prices with the issue of their individual promissory notes intended to circulate from hand to hand.

As a result of this redundancy of the currency, its value collapsed. Gold was quoted at a premium in Confederate notes in April 1861. By the end of that year, a paper dollar was quoted at 90 cents in gold; during 1862 that figure fell to 40 cents; during 1863, to 6 cents; and still lower during the last two years of the war. The downward course of this figure, with occasional recoveries, reflected the popular estimate of the Confederacy's chance of winning independence.

The oversupply of currency drove prices to exorbitant heights and disarranged all commerce. Savings in nominal dollars lost 90% or more of their value. It affected different classes of commodities differently. Imports like coffee became very expensive, and ersatz substitutes were found (Massey 1952). Confederate asset-price stabilization policies appear to have increased the velocity of circulation, and counterproductively channeled inflationary pressures into other areas of the economy. Three successive monetary reforms encouraged holders of treasury notes to exchange these notes for bonds by imposing deadlines on their convertibility. Confederate efforts aimed at precipitating the conversion of currency into bonds did temporarily suppress currency depreciation. These acts also triggered upsurges in commodity prices, however, because note holders rushed to spend the currency before their exchange rights were reduced.

=== Speculation, prices and hunger ===
January 1, 1864. … The prices of everything are very high. Corn seven dollars a bushel, calico ten dollars a yard, salt sixty dollars a hundred, cotton from sixty to eighty cents a pound, everything in like ratio.
November 16, 1864. Paid seven dollars [Confederate money] a pound for coffee, six dollars an ounce for indigo, twenty dollars for a quire of paper, five dollars for ten cents' worth of flax thread, six dollars for pins, and forty dollars for a bunch of factory thread.

— Journal of Dolly Sumner Lunt Burge. Mrs. Burge, a Maine native, widow of Thomas Burge, lived on the Burge Farm near Covington, Georgia, about 40 miles east of Atlanta.

Blockade runners made much more profit by importing liquor, fancy dresses, and other luxuries instead of munitions. Tobacco and cotton, which found few foreign buyers owing to the blockade, actually fell in value as quoted in gold. The great divergence of the price of these two commodities in the CSA and abroad—the New York price of cotton increased more than tenfold during the war—offered the strongest inducement to evade the blockade and export them. A small amount of Confederate cotton reached the world market by way of the blockade runners or via Mexico, netting handsome profits. By 1862 federal Treasury Department agents were buying cotton, offering high prices in gold. Tobacco and cotton were smuggled through the military lines in exchange for hospital stores, coffee and similar articles. The Confederate military authorities tried to suppress this illicit trade, but at times even they were carried away by the desire to secure the much-desired foreign supplies. The disturbances of prices, their local differences and fluctuations, produced wild speculation in the Confederate States. Normal commercial activity became almost impossible, and a gambling element was forced into every transaction. Speculation in gold became especially pronounced. Legislation and popular feeling targeted speculators, but to no avail. Even the government itself felt compelled to speculate in gold. Speculation in food and other articles was equally inevitable and was much decried. Laws passed to curb the speculators had no effect.

Shortages grew worse and worse, especially in the cities, leading to bread riots and significant malnutrition. Food rations in the Confederate army were cut; the cavalry was reduced because of a lack of fodder. Night blindness caused by malnutrition reduced the combat effectiveness of Confederate troops, who also lacked adequate blankets, clothing, and shoes. They read letters from home reporting on the worsening situation, as workers were lethargic and children were getting skinnier.

=== Price controls and impressment ===
Economic historians blame the relentless soaring of retail prices on the government's printing of more and more paper money—some $2.25 billion in all. The people at the time however primarily blamed speculators, who acquired an evil victorious image they could never shake off, as typified by the character Rhett Butler in Margaret Mitchell's 1936 novel Gone with the Wind. Increasingly the farmers, who were refusing to sell their product at low prices fixed by the government came under attack. Other critics claimed the Commissary Department because of its inefficiency and corruption, the collapse of the internal transportation system, with priority given to military needs over shipment of farm products, and the lack of cloth sacks and plows and the declining supervision of slaves, deliberate destruction caused by stragglers and union raids, as well as wasteful harvesting methods by inexperienced poorly supervised workers.

The rebel government made the shortages and inflation much worse by the policy of impressment, through which a military unit could seize food, horses, mules, wagons, and supplies—and sometimes of slaves to work on military fortifications. The impressment parties paid low fixed price using paper certificates that promised actual payment later. Flour sold for $100 per hundred pounds in Alexandria, Louisiana, in late 1863, but the impressment price was only $12. Farmers were outraged, and reduced their plantings, hid their crops, and moved their livestock out of reach of the impressment parties. If the Union lines were nearby, farmers could sell to the enemy for high prices paid in gold coin. In Georgia farmers hid a two-year supply of corn rather than sell to the government—but the weevils ruined the grain so much it was only good for the distillery. Increasingly the Confederacy adopted a taxation system based on tithing, that is, 10% of the crop to be turned over to the government. Voluntary compliance was hard to achieve, and violent resistance broke out in the mountain districts. Poor people were especially hard-hit by the runaway inflation, which led legislatures to pass laws making the collection of debts much harder. That of course antagonized the business class, sharply reduce the credits and loans they traditionally had made.

=== Government revenues ===
The effectiveness of the Union blockade and the peculiar industrial development of the Confederate States removed the possibility of an ample government revenue. Though import duties were levied, the proceeds amounted to almost nothing. A small export-duty on cotton was expected to produce a large revenue sufficient to base a loan upon, but the small amount of cotton exports reduced this source of revenue to an insignificant figure. Moreover, since few manufactures existed to tax under an internal revenue system such as the US government adopted, the Confederacy was cut off from deriving any considerable revenue from indirect taxation. The first Confederate tax law levied a direct tax of twenty million dollars, apportioned among the states. These, with the exception of Texas, contributed their apportioned share to the central government by issuing bonds or notes, so that the tax was in reality but a disguised form of loan. Real taxation was postponed until the spring of 1863, when a stringent measure was adopted taxing property and earnings. It was slowly and with difficulty put into effect, and was re-enacted in February 1864. In the states and cities there was a strong tendency to relax or postpone taxation in view of the other demands upon the people.

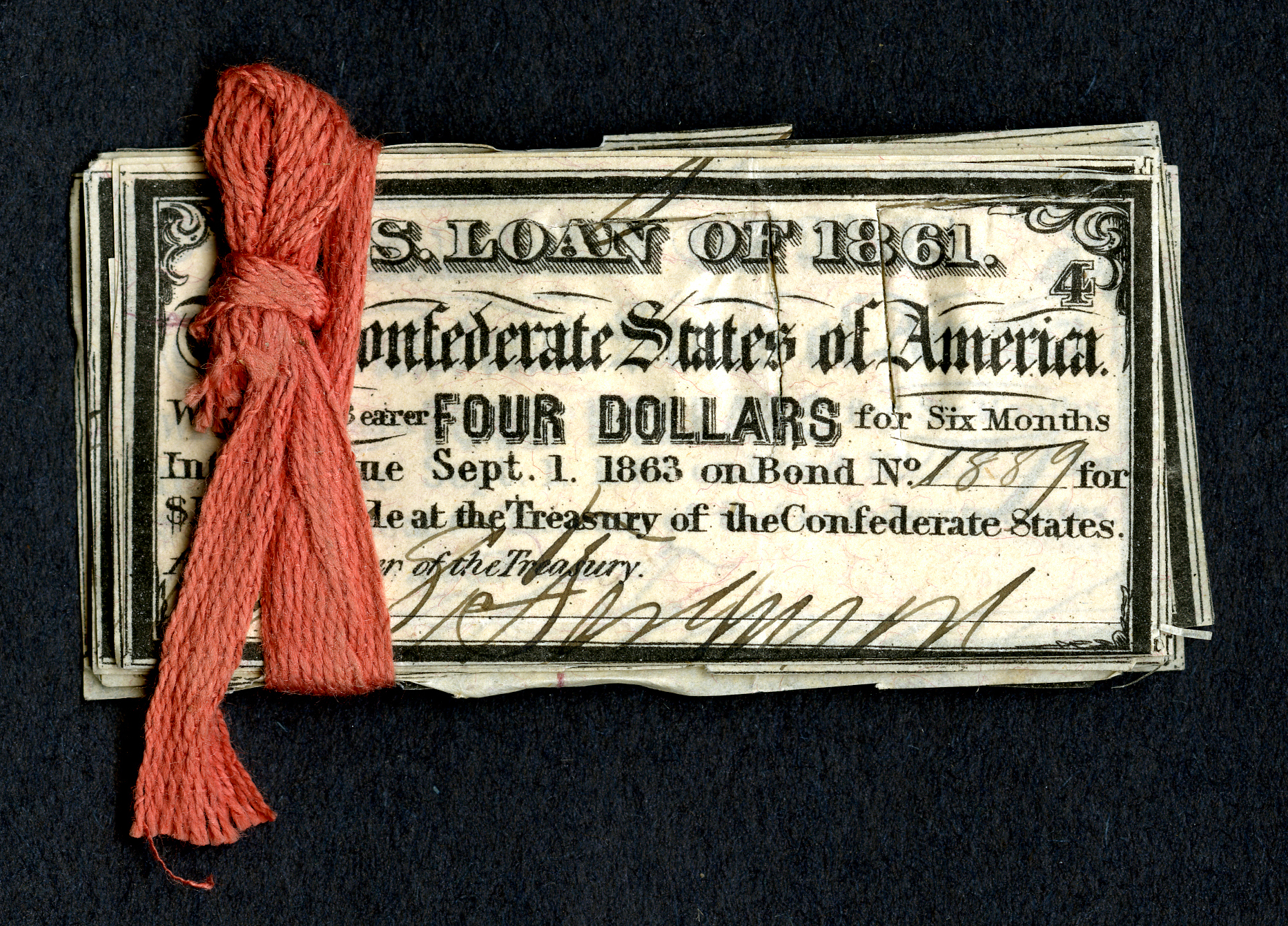
Redeemed CSA bond coupons, bound together with "Red tape".

With no revenue from taxation, and with the disastrous effects of the wholesale issue of paper money before it, the Confederate government made every effort to borrow money by issuing bonds. The initial $15 million loan was soon followed by an issue of one hundred million in bonds, which was, however, difficult to place. There followed even larger loans. The bonds rapidly fell in value, and were quoted during the war at approximately the value of the paper money, in which medium they were paid for by subscribers. To avoid this circumstance, a system of produce loans was devised by which the bonds were subscribed for in cotton, tobacco and food products. This policy was subsequently enlarged, and enabled the government to secure at least a part of the armies' food supplies. But the bulk of the subscriptions for these bonds was made in cotton, for which the planters were thus enabled to find a market.

Why did the Confederate government not undertake more external loans?...The other, more subtle, potential explanation for a small amount of external borrowing is the issuing of war debt presents a moral hazard, which rises starkly if, as in the case of the American Confederacy, lenders can expect that defeat would result in debt repudiation.

The South hoped to keep the currency within bounds by having holders of paper money exchange it for bonds, which the law allowed and encouraged—but as notes and bonds fell in value simultaneously, there was no inducement for holders to make that exchange. On the contrary, a note-holder had an advantage over a bond-holder, in that he could use his currency for speculation or for purchases in general.

In the autumn of 1862 Confederate law attempted to compel note-holders to fund their notes in bonds to reduce the redundancy of the currency and to lower prices. Disappointed in the result of this legislation, the Congress, in February 1864, went much farther in the same direction by passing a law requiring note-holders to fund their notes before a certain date, after which notes would be taxed a third or more of their face value. This drastic measure was accepted as meaning a partial repudiation of the Confederate debt, and though it for a time reduced the currency outstanding and lowered prices, it wrecked the government's credit, and made it impossible for the Treasury to float any more loans. During the last months of the war, the Treasury led a most precarious existence, and its actual operations can only be surmised.

During the entire war the notion that the CSA possessed a most efficient engine of war in its monopoly of cotton (the "King Cotton" idea) buoyed up the hopes of the Confederates. The government in Richmond strained every effort to induce the great powers of Europe to recognize the Confederacy as a nation (see Cotton diplomacy). It also—more successfully—secured individual foreigners' financial recognition of the Confederate States by effecting a foreign loan based on cotton. This favorite notion went into practice in the spring of 1863. The French banking house of Erlanger & Company undertook to float a loan of $3,000,000, redeemable after the war in cotton at the rate of sixpence a pound. According to one source, Baron Rothschild informed W. W. Murphy, American consul-general in Frankfort, that "all Germany condemned this act of lending money to establish a slaveholding government, and so great was public opinion against it that Erlanger and Company dare not offer it on the Frankfort bourse". As cotton at the time was selling at nearly four times that figure, and would presumably be quoted far above sixpence long after the establishment of peace, the bonds offered strong attractions to those speculatively inclined and in sympathy with the Confederate cause. The Confederate agents mismanaged the placing of the bonds in Europe, but notwithstanding, a considerable sum was secured from the public and used for the purchase of naval and military stores. This was aided in part by the (incorrect) assumption of some investors that, even should the Confederacy lose the war, the United States government would honor and redeem the bonds. However, at the close of the war the re-established Federal authorities ignored these foreign bonds, like all the other bonds of the Confederate government, or of state governments under the Confederacy.

== Long term weaknesses ==
By 1863, after two years of warfare, the North was finally fully mobilizing its economy, while the Southern economy had peaked and was waning. General William T. Sherman, an acute observer of the war, had predicted this development even before Sumter, telling a rebel acquaintance in late 1860:

The North can make a steam-engine, locomotive or railway car; hardly a yard of cloth or a pair of shoes can you make. You are rushing into war with one of the most powerful, ingeniously mechanical and determined people on earth—right at your doors. You are bound to fail. Only in your spirit and determination are you prepared for war. In all else you are totally unprepared. … At first you will make headway, but as your limited resources begin to fail, and shut out from the markets of Europe by blockade as you will be, your cause will begin to wane.

== See also ==
- Confederate war finance
- Confederate States dollar
- King Cotton

== Bibliography ==
=== General reference ===
- Carter, Susan B., ed. The Historical Statistics of the United States: Millennial Edition (5 vols), 2006.
- Coulter, E. Merton. The Confederate States of America, 1861–1865, (1950), survey
- Current, Richard N., et al. eds. Encyclopedia of the Confederacy (1993) (4 Volume set; also 1 vol abridged version); articles by scholars.
- Heidler, David S., et al. Encyclopedia of the American Civil War: A Political, Social, and Military History, (2002). 2740 pages (ISBN 039304758X)
- Schwab, John Christopher. The Confederate States of America, 1861–1865: A Financial and Industrial History of the South (1901) good survey of finances by a Yale economics professor; online free
- Thomas, Emory M. Confederate Nation: 1861–1865, 1979. Standard political-economic-social history

=== Specialized studies ===
- Andreano; Ralph ed. The Economic Impact of the American Civil War 1962, essays by economic historians
- Ball, Douglas B. Financial Failure and Confederate Defeat, 1991.
- Bensel, Richard Franklin. Yankee Leviathan: The Origins of Central State Authority in America, 1859–1877 (1990) ch 3
- Black, Robert C., III. The Railroads of the Confederacy, 1988.
- Bonner, Michael Brem. Confederate Political Economy: Creating and Managing a Southern Corporatist Nation (LSU Press, 2016) online review
- Burdekin, Richard C. K. and Farrokh Langdana. "War Finance in the Southern Confederacy, 1861–1865," Explorations in Economic History 30 (July 1993), with tables
- Burdekin, Richard C. K. and Marc D. Weidenmier, "Suppressing Asset Price Inflation: the Confederate Experience, 1861–1865" Economic Inquiry 2003 41(3): 420–432.
- Davis, William C. and Robertson, James I. Jr., eds. Virginia at War, 1861. U. Press of Kentucky, 2005. 241 pp.
- Dew, Charles B. Ironmaker to the Confederacy: Joseph R. Anderson and the Tredegar Iron Works Yale University Press 1966
- Diamond, William. "Imports of the Confederate Government from Europe and Mexico," Journal of Southern History (1940) 6#4, pp. 470–503 in JSTOR
- Gates, Paul W. Agriculture and the Civil War (1965)
- Massey, Mary. Ersatz in the Confederacy: Shortages and Substitutes on the Southern Homefront (1952) ISBN 0872498778
- Morgan, Chad. Planters' Progress: Modernizing Confederate Georgia. U. Press of Florida, 2005. 164 pp.
- Nevins, Allan. Ordeal of the Union, vol 5. The Improvised War, 1861–1862; vol 6. War Becomes Revolution, 1862–1863; vol 7. The Organized War, 1863–1864; vol 8. The Organized War to Victory, 1864–1865. (1970)
- Norman, Matthew W. Colonel Burton's Spiller & Burr Revolver: an Untimely Venture in Confederate Small-arms Manufacturing Mercer U. Press 1996.
- Ramsdell, Charles W. Behind the Lines in the Southern Confederacy (1944), short history
- Ramsdell, Charles W. "The Confederate Government and the Railroads," American Historical Review, (1917), 22#4 pp. 794–810 in JSTOR
- Resch, John P. et al., Americans at War: Society, Culture and the Homefront vol 2: 1816–1900 (2005)
- Rubin, Anne Sarah. A Shattered Nation: the Rise and Fall of the Confederacy, 1861–68 North Carolina Press, 2005.
- Sellers, James L. "The Economic Incidence of the Civil War in the South." Mississippi Valley Historical Review 14 (1927):179–191.
- Taylor, Robert A. Rebel Storehouse: Florida in the Confederate Economy U. of Alabama Press 1995
- Thomas, Emory M. The Confederacy As a Revolutionary Experience (1971)
- Turner, Charles W. "The Virginia Central Railroad at War, 1861–1865," Journal of Southern History (1946) 12#4, pp. 510–533 in JSTOR
- Vandiver, Frank. Ploughshares into Swords: Josiah Gorgas and Confederate Ordnance University of Texas Press, 1952
- Wakelyn, Jon L. Biographical Dictionary of the Confederacy Greenwood Press ISBN 0-8371-6124-X
- Wallenstein, Peter and Wyatt-Brown, Bertram, eds. Virginia's Civil War. U. Press of Virginia, 2005. 303 pp.
- Wallenstein, Peter. "Rich Man's War, Rich Man's Fight: Civil War and the Transformation of Public Finance in Georgia." Journal of Southern History 50 (1984):15–43.
- Wiley, Bell Irwin. The Plain People of the Confederacy, 1944.
- Wilson, Harold S. Confederate Industry: Manufacturers and Quartermasters in the Civil War U. Press of Mississippi, 2002.

==== Primary sources ====
- An Act to Prohibit the Importation of Luxuries, or of Articles not Necessary or of Common Use, 1864, a Confederate Congress document

=== Economic data sets ===
All data sets are in Historical Statistics of the United States: Millennial Edition Online (2006) available in academic libraries. See also Historical Statistics of the United States, Colonial Times to 1970 available on-line from the U.S. Census Bureau.

- Chapter Eh – Confederate States of America.
- Population of the slave states, by state, race, and slave status: 1860–1870 Series Eh1-7
- Farms, farm implements, livestock, and home manufactures in the slave states, by state: 1860–1870 Series Eh8-23
- Selected crop outputs of the slave states, by state: 1860–1870 Series Eh24-39
- Manufacturing in the slave states-establishments, capital invested, product value, and employment, by state: 1860–1870 Series Eh40-49
- Taxable property in the Confederacy, by state: 1861 Series Eh50-58
- Confederate blockade running-ships engaged, ships lost, and successful runs, by vessel type and port: 1861–1865 Series Eh59-94
- Quantity and price of cotton imported into the United Kingdom: 1855–1875 Series Eh95-102
- European cotton imports, by country of origin: 1860–1875 Series Eh103-110
- Money and Prices, Series Eh111-193 ISBN 978-0511132971
- Confederate money stock: 1860–1862 [Godfrey, nine states] Series Eh111-117
- Confederate money stock: 1860–1865 [Godfrey, seven states] Series Eh118-124
- Confederate money stock: 1861–1864 [Lerner] Series Eh125-127
- Prices and wage indexes for the eastern Confederacy: 1861–1865 Series Eh128-130
- Monthly index of Richmond wholesale commodity prices: 1861–1865 Series Eh131
- Wholesale commodity price indexes in Richmond, the eastern Confederacy, New York City and San Francisco: 1861–1865 Series Eh132-135
- Monthly wholesale price quotations for selected commodities in Richmond: 1856–1865 Series Eh136-165
- Monthly commodity price indexes for the Confederate states: 1861–1865 Series Eh166-193
- Government Finances, Series Eh194-228 ISBN 978-0511132971
- Confederate government revenues and expenditures: 1861–1864 Series Eh194-215
- Bond yields on domestic loans in the Confederacy: 1862–1864 Series Eh216-220
- Weekly prices of Confederate cotton bonds and sterling bonds in Amsterdam: 1863–1865 Series Eh221-222
- Gold prices in the Confederacy: 1861–1865 Series Eh223-228

=== Historiography ===
- Gallagher, Gary W. "Home Front and Battlefield: Some Recent Literature Relating to Virginia and the Confederacy," Virginia Magazine of History and Biography Vol. 98, No. 2, pp. 135–168 in JSTOR
- Massey, Mary Elizabeth. "The Confederate States of America: The Homefront," in Rembert Patrick, ed., Writing Southern History: Essays in Historiography (1965), pp. 249–272
- Steven E. Woodworth, ed. The American Civil War: A Handbook of Literature and Research, 1996. 750 pages of historiography and bibliography
