= Confederate States dollar =

Currency of the Confederate States of America

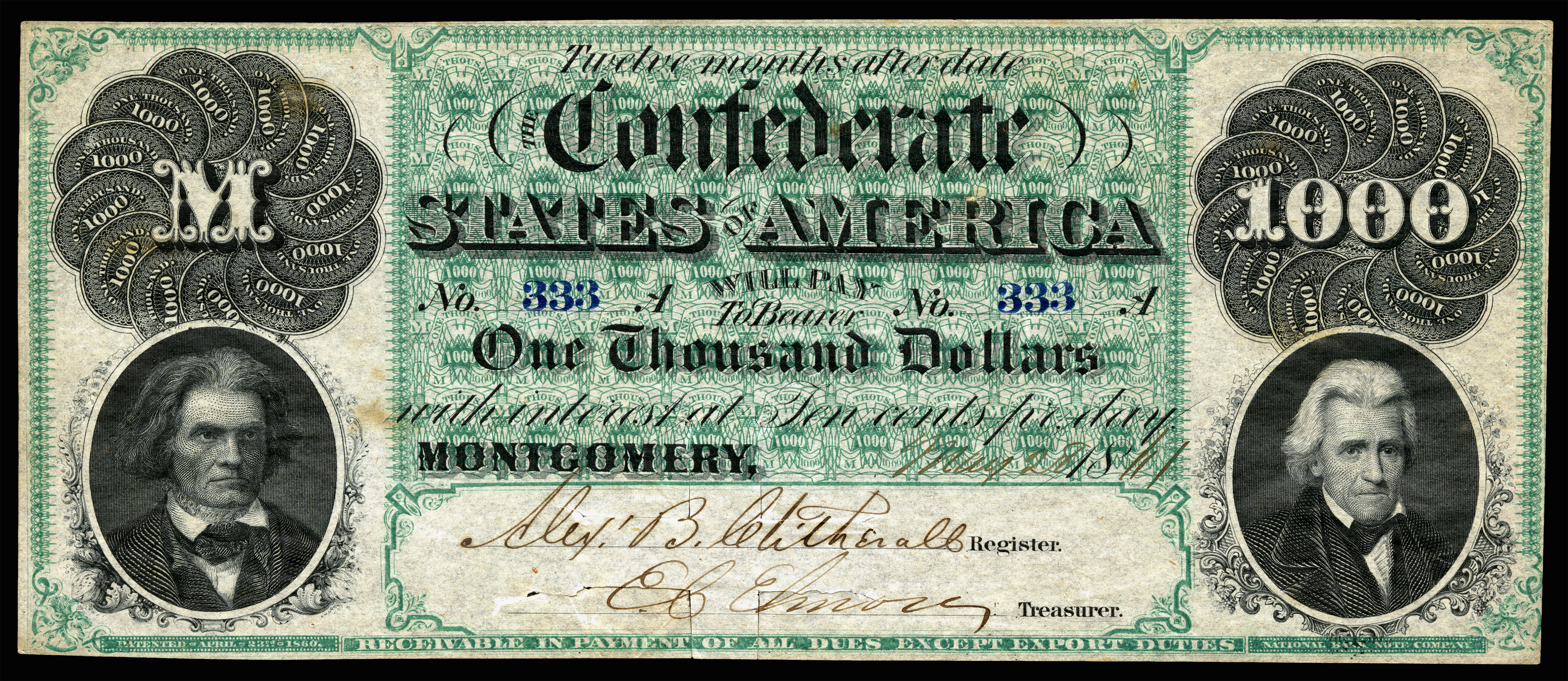
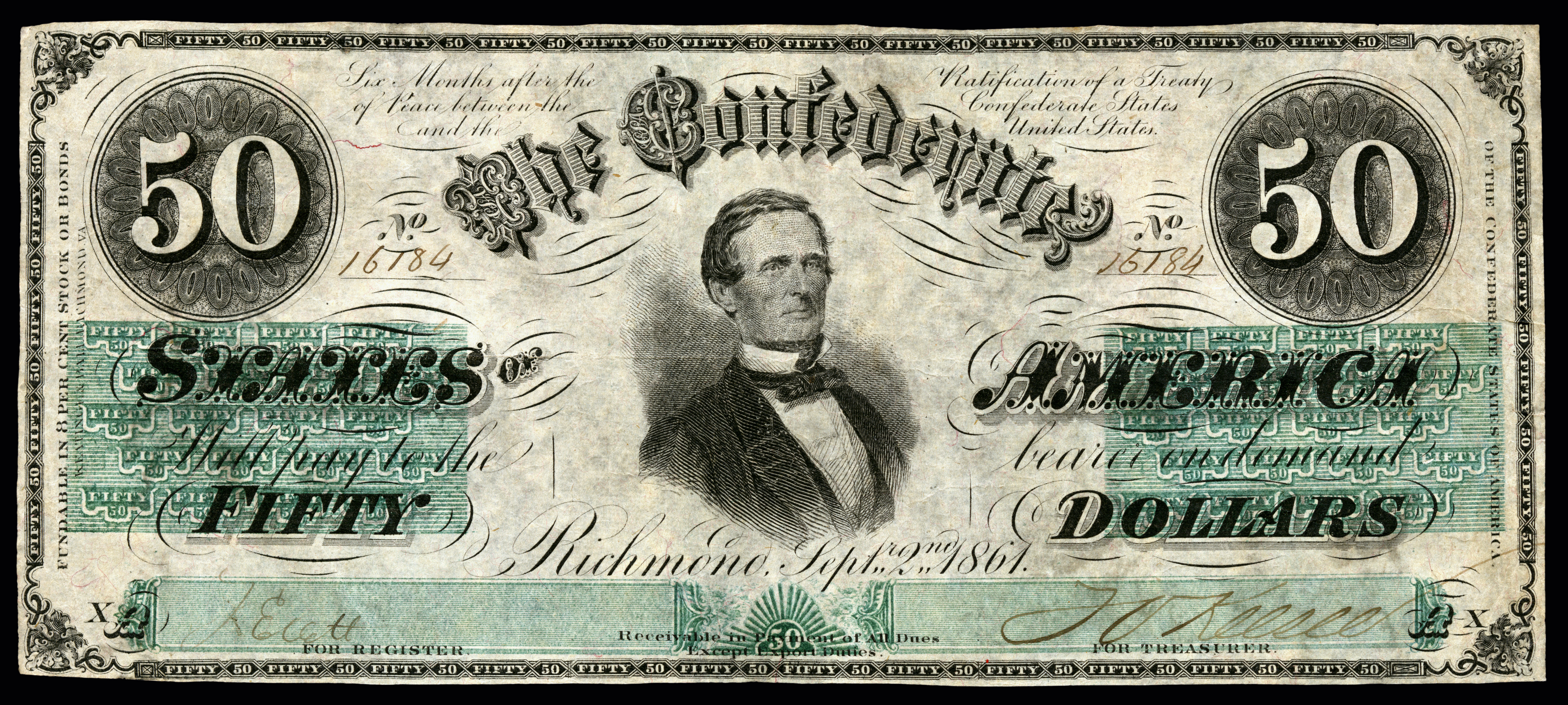
- $1,000 depicting John C. Calhoun and Andrew Jackson $50 depicting Jefferson Davis

Units of account
- Symbol: $ or C$ or (mostly used) ¢
- Subunit
- 1/100: cent
- Symbol
- cent: ¢

Denominations
- Banknotes: 50¢, $1, $2, $5, $10, $20, $50, $100, $500, $1,000
- Coins: 50¢, 1¢

Demographics
- Date of introduction: April 1861
- Date of withdrawal: 1865
- User(s): Confederate States of America
- This infobox shows the latest status before this currency was rendered obsolete.

The Confederate States dollar was the currency of the Confederate States. It was not backed by hard assets, but simply by a promise to pay the bearer after the war, on the prospect of Southern victory and independence. As the Civil War progressed and victory for the South seemed less and less likely, its value declined. After the Confederacy's defeat by the Union, its money had no value, with many individuals and banks losing hefty amounts of sums.

The first series of Confederate paper money, issued in March 1861, bore interest and had a total circulation of $1,000,000. As the war began to turn against the Confederates, confidence in the currency diminished, and the government inflated the currency by continuing to print unbacked banknotes. By the end of 1863, the Confederate States dollar (or "Grayback", to distinguish it from then-new "Greenback" paper of the U.S. dollar, which was likewise put into circulation during the war) was quoted at just six cents in gold, and fell further still.

The "Grayback" is now a prized collector's item, in its many versions, including those issued by individual states and local banks. The various engravings of leading Confederates, gods and goddesses, trains, ships, and slaves on these hastily printed banknotes, sometimes cut with scissors and signed by clerks, continue to stimulate debate among antique dealers, with even some of the counterfeit notes commanding high prices.

== Background ==
The Confederate States dollar, often also once called the "Grayback", was first issued into circulation in April 1861, when the Confederacy was only two months old, and on the eve of the outbreak of the American Civil War.

At first, the Confederate States currency was highly accepted and circulated throughout the American South as a medium of exchange with high purchasing power. As the war progressed, confidence in the ultimate success waned, the amount of paper money increased, and their dates of redemption were extended further into the future. Most Confederate currency carried the phrase across the top of the bill: "SIX MONTHS AFTER THE RATIFICATION OF A TREATY OF PEACE BETWEEN THE CONFEDERATE STATES AND THE UNITED STATES" then across the middle, the "CONFEDERATE STATES OF AMERICA WILL PAY [amount of bill] TO BEARER" (or "...WILL PAY TO BEARER [amount of bill]" or "...WILL PAY TO BEARER ON DEMAND [amount of bill]").

As the war progressed, the currency underwent the depreciation and soaring prices characteristic of inflation. For example, when news of the Confederate defeat at Gettysburg had reached the American public, the Confederate currency had depreciated to 20%. Confederate President Jefferson Davis asked private citizens to restore the value of the Confederate dollar by mutually agreeing to sell and buy items only at reduced prices. In October 1863, Confederate States Senator Louis Wigfall of Texas said that a Confederate soldier received $11 per month in pay, which was worth the same as $1 had been worth at the beginning of the war. In September 1864, one Confederate dollar was worth the same as three cents in gold currency. People tried to retain their wealth by buying gold to such an extent that, in Richmond, it was impossible to find someone who would sell their gold. On Christmas Day, 1864, the Confederate dollar's worth had decreased to such an extent that a turkey sold for $155 and a ham for $300. By the war's end, a cake of soap could sell for as much as $50, and an ordinary suit of clothes was $2,700.

Near the end of the war, the currency became practically worthless as a medium of exchange. This was because, for the most part, Confederate currency was bills of credit, as in the Revolutionary War, not secured or backed by any assets. The only two exceptions were in Mississippi, where in 1862 a series of notes were issued with the backing of cotton stored by the state's planters and in Florida, where notes were backed, in theory, by public lands. Just as the currency issued by the Continental Congress was deemed worthless (witness the phrase "not worth a Continental;" and see The Federalist Papers, which also addressed this issue in the run-up to the ratification of the U.S. Constitution) because they were not backed by any hard assets, this too became the case with Confederate currency. Even though gold and silver may have been scarce, some economic historians have suggested that the currency would have retained a relatively material degree of value, and for a longer period of time, had it been backed by hard goods the Confederacy did have, such as cotton or tobacco. When the Confederacy ceased to exist as a political entity at the end of the war, the money lost all value as fiat currency.

== Designs ==
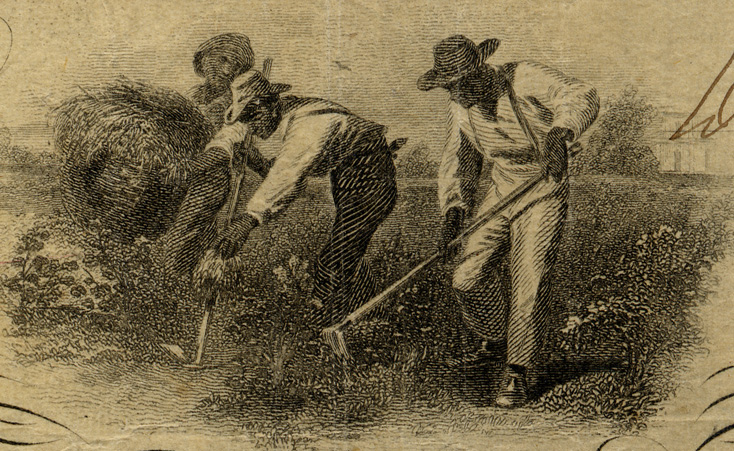
Black Slaves working in a field, as seen in a $100 C.S. banknote

The Confederacy, being limited in skilled engravers and printers as well as secure printing facilities, often had to make do with unrelated designs in early banknote issues. Some such were abstract depictions of mythological gods and goddesses, for example such as the Goddess of Liberty. Typical Confederate themes had included naval ships and prominent US historical figures, including George Washington. Out of the 72 notes issued by the Confederate States of America, five depicted African American slaves.

Since most engravers and bank plates were in the Northern states, Confederate printers used offset or lithographic process to copy scenes that had been used on whatever notes they had access to. Many variations in plates, printing and papers also appear in most of the issues, due in large part to the limits on commerce that had resulted from the Union blockade and the inadequate Confederate railroads in the American Civil War.

People featured on the banknotes include Andrew Jackson, John C. Calhoun, Christopher Memminger, Robert M. T. Hunter, Alexander H. Stephens, Jefferson Davis, Judah P. Benjamin, Clement Clay, George W. Randolph, and Lucy Holcombe Pickens, the wife of the Governor of South Carolina. There was also a bill proposing featuring George Washington.

== Signatures ==
The Confederate States Treasury Notes were hand signed by various clerks, with exception of the 50 cent issues that had the printed signatures of both Robert Tyler and Edward C. Elmore. The first six notes issued were hand signed by the Register and Treasurer themselves. While hand signatures were considered an anti-counterfeiting tool, the sheer number of bills being produced could not reasonably be signed individually by two men each. Women were often hired as clerks to sign "for Register" and "for Treasurer". Up to 200 clerks were eventually hired for each.

== Coinage ==
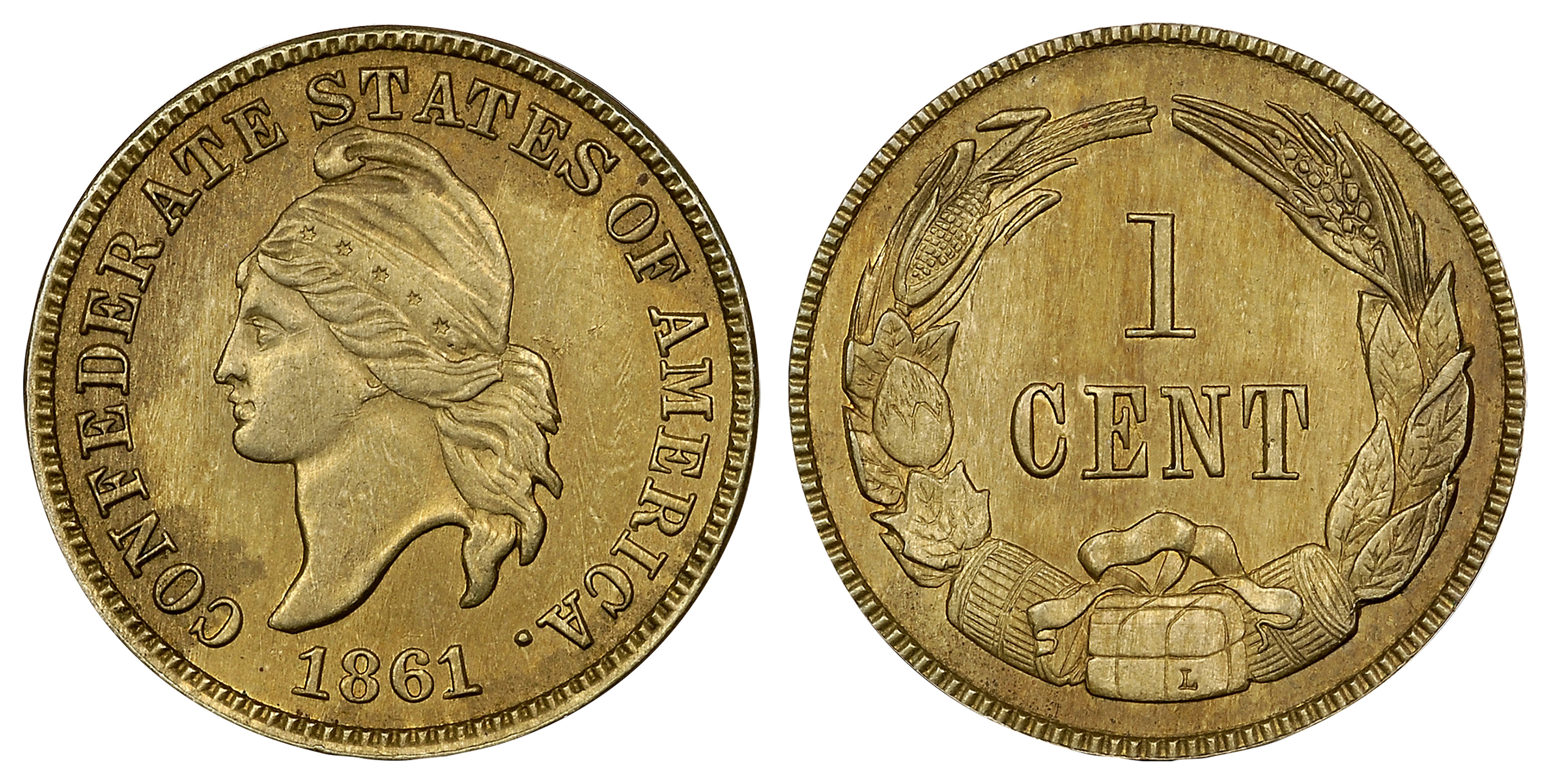
1861 1¢ original Confederate Cent

As the American Civil War continued, the cost of the war loomed large. Any precious metals available in the South often made their way to Europe to procure war goods, but the CSA did manage to mint a few coins. In 1861, Robert Lovett Jr. of Philadelphia was commissioned to design, engrave, and make a one cent piece for the Confederacy. On the obverse (front), he used the head of Minerva (French Liberty Head), which he had used on several store cards. The coins were struck using the then Federal standard of cupronickel for cent pieces. He made a few samples, of which only 12 had been said to exist by the popular stories but research has shown that 14 are currently known to exist. Fearing prosecution for aiding the enemy, he stopped his work and hid the coins and dies in his cellar. The original dies were purchased later and used to make restrikes, first by John W. Haseltine and later by Robert S. Bashlow. The dies were donated to the Smithsonian Institution by Bashlow in 1962.

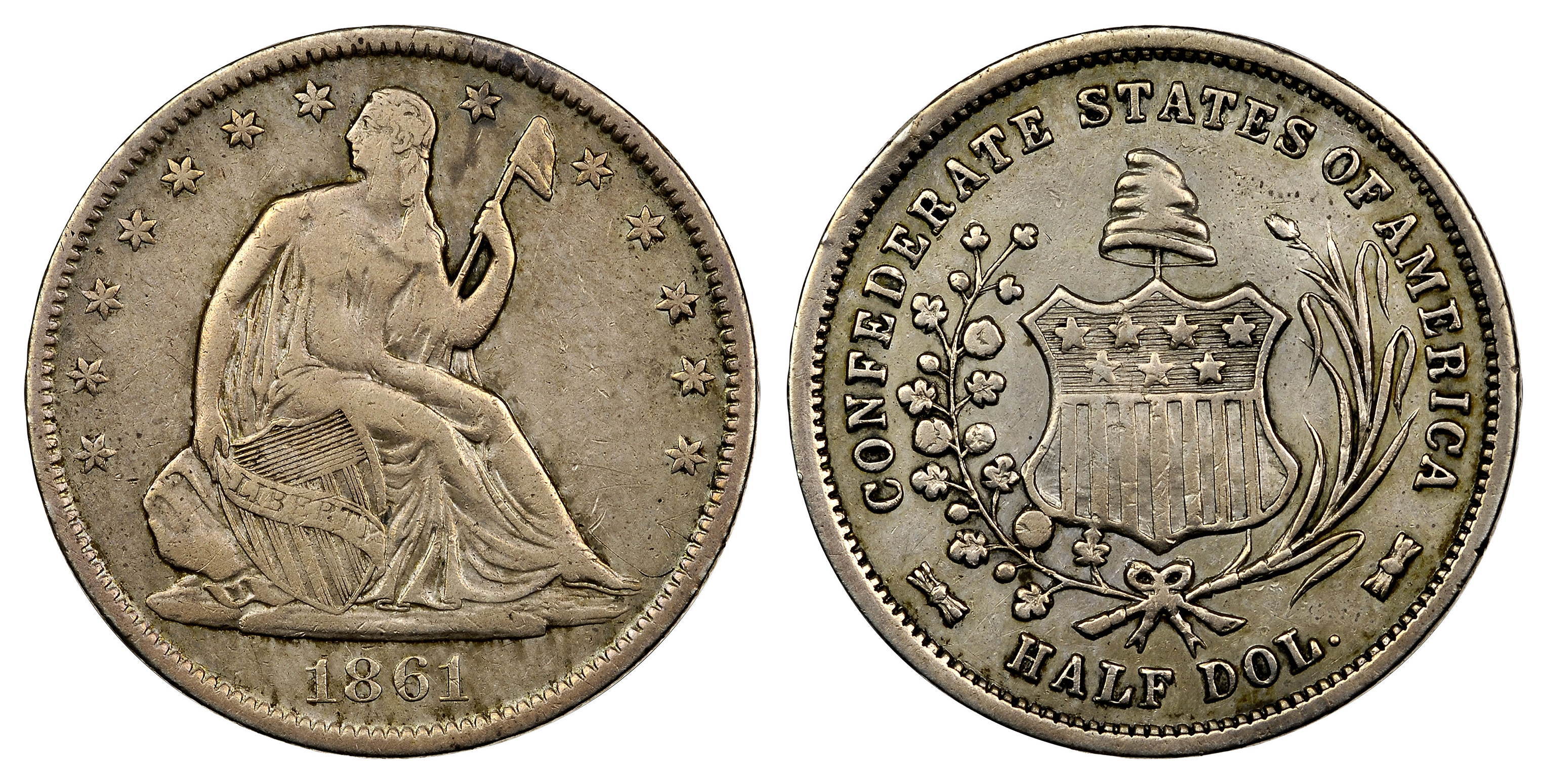
1861 50¢ original Confederate Half Dollar reportedly belonging to CSA President Jefferson Davis

In the aftermath of secession, the Confederacy seized U.S. Mint facilities at Charlotte, North Carolina, Dahlonega, Georgia, and New Orleans, Louisiana. After seizing and appropriating the bullion reserves stored at the facilities, the Confederate States Treasury, led by C. G. Memminger, determined that the cost of minting coins far outweighed the benefits. Circulating specie would be virtually nonexistent in the Confederacy throughout the entirety of the war. A wide variety of local token and scrip would attempt to fill this void, to little avail.

In late April 1861, four Confederate States half dollars were struck on a hand press by employees of the New Orleans Mint. Because of the high relief of the coin die, a test striking was made to determine if the coins would release from the Confederate die. The die was made by a printing plate engraver (A.H.M. Peterson) in New Orleans who was unfamiliar with techniques required to engrave coining dies. These coins were struck using a U.S. obverse die (Seated Liberty) and the Confederate die made by Peterson. These coins are known as originals, and the location of all four of the coins is known today.

As the result of an 1879 article about the Confederate cent printed in a New York City newspaper, Benjamin F. Taylor, M.D. (Chief Coiner, New Orleans Mint, CSA) contacted coin dealer Ebenezer Mason. Taylor informed Mason of the existence of the Confederate half dollar and the die. Mason bought the die and coin from Taylor and sold them to J.W. Scott Co. of New York City, a coin and stamp dealer. Scott bought 500 1861 United States half dollars from a New York bank that were supposedly struck at the New Orleans Mint. Scott had the reverse of the half dollars planed down and performed a one-sided strike using the Confederate half dollar die. The Seated Liberty obverse of the coins were flattened some because of the one-sided strike. In addition, Scott struck 500 half dollar-sized tokens in white metal using the Confederate die and a newly made die to commemorate the restrikes of the Confederate half dollars. The Confederate half dollar die went missing during the 1920s and has not been seen since.

Popular stories claim one of the Confederate half dollars was given to Confederate President Jefferson Davis. This story has no basis in fact. In an 1879 letter to Ebenezer Mason, Davis confirmed that a Union soldier (actually a Federal U.S. Officer) stole a coin from one of his wife's trunks, but could not confirm that it was like the then known Confederate half dollar. It is possible that the coin was a gold so-called Jefferson Davis dime struck at the Paris (France) Mint, which Davis described to coin dealer Ed Frossard in an 1880 letter. All known Jefferson Davis dimes were struck in silver at the Paris Mint. The Davis letter is the only known reference to a gold specimen, which was likely a special presentation piece made for Davis.

== Banknotes ==
The Confederate States Treasury Banknotes were ultimately issued in 50¢, $1, $2, $5, $10, $20, $50, $100, $500, and $1,000 denominations with a variety of designs, issuers, and redeemable obligations. The amount of currency that had been issued under the various acts of the Confederate States Congress totaled into $1.7 billion. Bills were released in 72 different note "types" in seven "series" from 1861 through 1864.

Since there were many types of Confederate notes as well as State notes issued by the states of the Confederacy, and since banks could issue their own notes, counterfeiting was a major problem for the Confederacy. Many of these contemporary counterfeits are identifiable today and they can be as valuable to a collector as a real note.

Confederate States dollars remain the subject of a lively trade, with careful grading of damage and deterioration similar to booksellers' gradings.

=== Series of CSA notes ===
Series and authorizing actsConfederate States dollar banknotes (1861–1864)
Series	Authorization	Amount	Denominations	Comments
First	Act of March 9, 1861; Amended August 3, 1861	$1,000,000 (i) $1,000,000 (ii)	$50, $100, $500, $1,000 (i) $50, $100 (ii)	Interest bearing at 3.65%, payable twelve months after date
Second	Act of May 16, 1861	$20,000,000	$5, $10, $20, $50, $100	No interest, payable two years after date
Third	Act of August 19, 1861; Amended December 24, 1861	$100,000,000 (i) $50,000,000 (ii)	$5, $10, $20, $50, $100	Funded by 8% bonds, payable six months after a treaty/peace between the U.S. and CSA
Fourth	Act of April 17, 1862; Amended September 23, 1862	$170,000,000 (i) $5,000,000 (ii)	$1, $2, $10, $20, $100	Introduced $1 and $2 notes, and $100 interest-bearing notes (2 cents per day)
Fifth	Act of October 13, 1862	$90,000,000 (Note: Despite the authorized amount, $138,000,000 was issued.)	$1, $2, $5, $10, $20, $50, $100	Payable six months after ratification of a treaty. Lower denominations issued on pink paper
Sixth	Act of March 23, 1863	$50,000,000 (Note: Despite the authorized amount, over $517,900,000 was issued.)	50¢, $1, $2, $5, $10, $20, $50, $100	Payable two years after ratification of a treaty
Seventh	Act of February 17, 1864	$200,000,000 (Note: Despite the authorized amount, over $400,000,000 was issued.)	50¢, $1, $2, $5, $10, $20, $50, $100, $500	Payable two years after ratification of a treaty

=== Banknote printers and engravers ===
Printers and engravers of Confederate States dollar banknotes (1861–1864)
Engraver/Printer	Location	Types printed	Comments
National Bank Note Company	New York, NY	1–4	Part of the American Bank Note Company
Southern Bank Note Company	New Orleans, LA	5, 6, 15, 19, 22, 31	Southern branch of the American Bank Note Company
Hoyer & Ludwig	Richmond, VA	7–11, 13–14, 17–18, 27–28, 35–36, 46	Louis Hoyer and Charles Ludwig, in operation 1861–64
Jules Manouvrier	New Orleans, LA	12	Lithographer, contracted to print $10 CSA notes. Some were stolen and entered circulation with forged signatures. Contract cancelled
Leggett, Keatinge & Ball	Richmond, VA	23, 24, 32, 33	Edward Keatinge (formerly a portrait engraver with the Southern Bank Note Company) joined Leggett & Ball shortly after the Civil War began. Leggett was forced out after being accused of spying for the Union, and the company became Keatinge & Ball.
Keatinge & Ball	Columbia, SC; Richmond, VA	16, 21, 25, 26, 34, 41, 49–62, 64–71	In 1862, Keatinge & Ball moved to Richmond.
Blanton Duncan	Columbia, SC; Richmond, VA	20, 29, 30, 37, 38, 42–45	Originally from Kentucky, Duncan moved to Richmond at the invitation of Christopher Memminger to open a paper mill and printing plant.
J.T. Patterson	Columbia, SC	28, 36, 39, 40,	
Archer & Daly	Richmond, VA	63	A lithographic firm specializing mainly in CSA stocks and bonds
Archer & Halpin	Richmond, VA	72	

=== Complete typeset of CSA banknotes ===
A complete typeset of the Confederate States dollar banknotes (1861–1864)
Series/Date	Type (Note: "T" numbers refer to the categorization system widely used in Confederate banknotes and denote major design changes. Dates underneath "T" numbers (when available) indicate the beginning and end dates of issue for the particular note)	Value	Image	Comments (Note: Comments include the portraits or vignettes listed from left to right, the engraver and/or publisher of the note, and the number of notes issued. The single reference citation applies to all information in the cell.)
First Series	T–1 5 Apr 1861 21 Jun 1861	$1,000		John C. Calhoun, Andrew Jackson; National Bank Note Company (607 issued)
First Series	T–2 8 Apr 1861 23 Jul 1861	$500		Ceres, The Crossing (by James Smillie); National Bank Note Company (607 issued)
First Series	T–3 5 Apr 1861 21 Jun 1861	$100		Minerva, railroad National Bank Note Company (1,606 issued)
First Series	T–4 5 Apr 1861 21 Jun 1861	$50		Slaves working in a field National Bank Note Company (1,606 issued)
First Series	T–5 25 Aug 1861 23 Sep 1861	$100		Justice, Hudson River Railroad, Minerva; Southern Bank Note Company (5,798 issued)
First Series	T–6 25 Aug 1861 23 Sep 1861	$50		Justice, Agriculture and Industry, George Washington; Southern Bank Note Company (5,798 issued)
Second Series	T–7 29 Jul 1861 22 Oct 1861	$100		George Washington, Ceres, and Proserpina; Hoyer & Ludwig (Richmond, VA) (37,155 issued) (Note: Federal authorities forbid the National Bank Note Company (and their affiliate Southern Bank Note Company) from printing currency for the Confederate States of America. The CSA turned to local lithographer Hoyer & Ludwig to print the next series of notes. The paper quality and printing technique is noticeably inferior to the prior First Series.)
Second Series	T–8 29 Jul 1861 22 Oct 1861	$50		Tellus, George Washington; Hoyer & Ludwig (Richmond, VA) (123,564 issued)
Second Series	T–9 25 Jul 1861 26 Oct 1861	$20		Sailing ship Hoyer & Ludwig (Richmond, VA) (264,988 issued)
Second Series	T–10 25 Jul 1861 2 Nov 1861	$10		Liberty (seated), Liberty (leaning on shield); Hoyer & Ludwig (Richmond, VA) (170,994 issued)
Second Series	T–11 29 Jul 1861 7 Sep 1861	$5		Sailor (leaning), Liberty (seated); Hoyer & Ludwig (Richmond, VA) (73,355 issued)
Second Series	T–12	$5		"Confederate States of America"; Jules Manouvrier (New Orleans, LA) (15,556 issued)
Third Series	T–13 22 Oct 1861 16 Apr 1862	$100		Sailor (standing), slaves loading cotton Hoyer & Ludwig (Richmond, VA) (629,284 issued)
Third Series	T–14 22 Oct 1861 16 Apr 1862	$50		Sailors, Moneta with treasure chest Hoyer & Ludwig (Richmond, VA) (469,660 issued)
Third Series	T–15 8 Jan 1862 15 May 1862	$50		Hope, Hudson River Railroad, Justice; Southern Bank Note Company (14,860 issued)
Third Series	T–16 17 Apr 1862 10 Dec 1862	$50		Jefferson Davis; Keatinge & Ball (Richmond, VA) (425,944 issued)
Third Series	T–17 14 Sep 1861 5 Nov 1861	$20		Liberty, Ceres between Commerce and Navigation; Hoyer & Ludwig (Richmond, VA) (43,732 issued)
Third Series	T–18 24 Oct 1861 16 Aug 1862	$20		Sailor, Sailing ship Hoyer & Ludwig (Richmond, VA) (2,366,486 issued)
Third Series	T–19 8 Jan 1862 15 May 1862	$20		Minerva, Navigation, Blacksmith; Southern Bank Note Company (14,860 issued)
Third Series	T–20 21 Jun 1862 8 Dec 1862	$20		Alexander H. Stephens, Industry between Commerce and beehive B. Duncan (Columbia, S.C.) (2,834,251 issued)
Third Series	T–21 28 Jun 1862 15 Nov 1862	$20		Alexander H. Stephens; Keatinge & Ball (Columbia, S.C.) (164,248 issued)
Third Series	T–22 13 Nov 1861 15 May 1862	$10		Thetis, Native Americans, Female with X Southern Bank Note Company (58,860 issued)
Third Series	T–23 15 Nov 1861 30 Dec 1861	$10		John E. Ward, Wagon of cotton, Corn gatherer Leggett, Keatinge & Ball (Richmond, VA) (20,333 issued)
Third Series	T–24 20 Feb 1862 8 Dec 1862	$10		Robert M.T. Hunter (left); Reverend Alfred L. Elwyn (vignette, as child); Leggett, Keatinge & Ball (Richmond, VA) (278,400 issued)
Third Series	T–25 12 May 1862 9 Aug 1862	$10		Robert M.T. Hunter (left); Hope; C.G. Memminger; Keatinge & Ball (Richmond, VA) (178,716 issued)
Third Series	T–26 12 Jul 1862 8 Dec 1862	$10		Robert M.T. Hunter (left); Hope; C.G. Memminger; Keatinge & Ball (Richmond, VA) (514,400 issued)
Third Series	T–27 26 Nov 1861 5 Dec 1861	$10		Liberty; Train; Hoyer & Ludwig (Richmond, VA) (8,576 issued)
Third Series	T–28 23 Jan 1862 13 Dec 1862	$10		Ceres and Commerce; Train; Hoyer & Ludwig (Richmond, VA); J.T. Patterson (Columbia, S.C.) (1,074,980 issued)
Third Series	T–29 17 Mar 1862 13 Sep 1862	$10		Slave picking cotton; canal B. Duncan (Richmond, VA) (286,627 issued)
Third Series	T–30 14 Jun 1862 3 Jan 1863	$10		Robert M.T. Hunter (left); engraving of the painting General Marion Inviting a British Officer to Share His Meal by John Blake White; Minerva; B. Duncan (Columbia, S.C.) (1,939,810 issued)
Third Series	T–31 13 Nov 1861 15 May 1862	$5		Navigation; Commerce, Agriculture, Justice, Liberty, and Industry; George Washington statue Southern Bank Note Company (58,860 issued)
Third Series	T–32 15 Nov 1861 30 Dec 1861	$5		Boy; Machinist with hammer Leggett, Keatinge & Ball (Richmond, VA) (20,333 issued)
Third Series	T–33 13 Mar 1862 19 Jun 1862	$5		C.G. Memminger; Minerva; Leggett, Keatinge & Ball (Richmond, VA) (136,736 issued)
Third Series	T–34 12 May 1862 8 Dec 1862	$5		C.G. Memminger; Minerva; Keatinge & Ball (Richmond, VA) (228,644 issued)
Third Series	T–35 26 Nov 1861 5 Dec 1861	$5		Slaves load cotton; Indian princess Hoyer & Ludwig (Richmond, VA) (7,160 issued)
Third Series	T–36 31 Mar 1862 3 Jan 1863	$5		Sailor; Commerce (seated); Hoyer & Ludwig (Richmond, VA); J.T. Patterson (Columbia, S.C.) (3,694,890 issued)
Third Series	T–37 7 Apr 1862 13 Sep 1862	$5		C.G. Memminger; Sailor (seated); Justice and Ceres; B. Duncan (Richmond, VA) (1,002,478 issued)
Fourth Series	T–38	$2		Judah P. Benjamin; The South striking down the Union; B. Duncan (Columbia, S.C.) (~36,000 issued)
Fourth Series	T–39	$100		Milkmaid; train with straight steam Hoyer & Ludwig (Richmond, VA); J.T. Patterson (Columbia, S.C.) (284,000 issued)
Fourth Series	T–40	$100		Milkmaid; train with diffused steam J.T. Patterson & Co. (Columbia, S.C.) (214,400 issued)
Fourth Series	T–41	$100		John C. Calhoun; Slaves working; Confederacy; Keatinge & Ball (Richmond, VA) (670,400 issued)
Fourth Series	T–42	$2		Judah P. Benjamin; The South striking down the Union; B. Duncan (Columbia, S.C.) (1,520,000 issued)
Fourth Series	T–43	$2		Judah P. Benjamin; The South striking down the Union; B. Duncan (Columbia, S.C.) (194,900 issued)
Fourth Series	T–44	$1		Liberty; Steamship at sea; Lucy Pickens; B. Duncan (Columbia, S.C.) (1,689,860 issued)
Fourth Series	T–45	$1		Liberty; Steamship at sea; Lucy Pickens; B. Duncan (Columbia, S.C.) (412,500 issued)
Fourth Series	T–46	$10		Ceres; Robert M.T. Hunter; Hoyer & Ludwig (Richmond, VA) (635,250 issued)
Fourth Series	T–47	$20		Ceres; Robert M.T. Hunter; Test pattern or fantasy note
Fourth Series	T–48	$10		Ceres; Robert M.T. Hunter; Test pattern or fantasy note
Fifth Series	T–49	$100		Soldiers; Lucy Pickens; George W. Randolph; Keatinge & Ball (Richmond, VA) (628,640 issued)
Fifth Series	T–50	$50		Jefferson Davis; Keatinge & Ball (Richmond, VA & Columbia, S.C.) (414,200 issued)
Fifth Series	T–51	$20		Tennessee State Capitol; Alexander H. Stephens; Keatinge & Ball (Columbia, S.C.) (776,800 issued)
Fifth Series	T–52	$10		Proposed state capitol (Columbia, S.C.); Robert M.T. Hunter; Keatinge & Ball (Columbia, S.C.) (3,060,000 issued)
Fifth Series	T–53	$5		Virginia State Capitol; C.G. Memminger; Keatinge & Ball (Columbia, S.C.) (2,833,600 issued)
Fifth Series	T–54	$2		Judah P. Benjamin; Keatinge & Ball (Columbia, S.C.) (607,000 issued)
Fifth Series	T–55	$1		Clement Claiborne Clay; Keatinge & Ball (Columbia, S.C.) (1,141,200 issued)
Sixth Series	T–56	$100		Soldiers; Lucy Pickens; George W. Randolph; Keatinge & Ball (Columbia, S.C.) (1,950,400)
Sixth Series	T–57	$50		Jefferson Davis; Keatinge & Ball (Richmond, VA and Columbia, S.C.) (2,349,600 issued)
Sixth Series	T–58	$20		Tennessee State Capitol; Alexander H. Stephens; Keatinge & Ball (Columbia, S.C.) (4,429,600 issued)
Sixth Series	T–59	$10		Proposed state capitol (Columbia, S.C.); Robert M.T. Hunter; Keatinge & Ball (Columbia, S.C.) (7,420,800 issued)
Sixth Series	T–60	$5		Virginia State Capitol; C.G. Memminger; Keatinge & Ball (Columbia, S.C.) (7,745,600 issued)
Sixth Series	T–61	$2		Judah P. Benjamin; Keatinge & Ball (Columbia, S.C.) (689,200 issued)
Sixth Series	T–62	$1		Clement Claiborne Clay; Keatinge & Ball (Columbia, S.C.) (1,645,600 issued)
Sixth Series	T–63	$0.50		Jefferson Davis; Archer & Daly (Richmond, VA) (1,831,517 issued)
Seventh Series	T–64	$500		Confederate seal and second national flag; Stonewall Jackson; Keatinge & Ball (Columbia, S.C.) (~154,000 issued)
Seventh Series	T–65	$100		Soldiers; Lucy Pickens; George W. Randolph; Keatinge & Ball (Columbia, S.C.) (~964,000 issued)
Seventh Series	T–66	$50		Jefferson Davis; Keatinge & Ball (Columbia, S.C.) (1,671,444 issued)
Seventh Series	T–67	$20		Tennessee State Capitol; Alexander H. Stephens; Keatinge & Ball (Columbia, S.C.) (~4,150,000 issued)
Seventh Series	T–68	$10		Horses pulling cannon; Robert M.T. Hunter; Keatinge & Ball (Columbia, S.C.) (~9,071,000 issued)
Seventh Series	T–69	$5		Virginia State Capitol; C.G. Memminger; Keatinge & Ball (Columbia, S.C.) (~5,526,100 issued)
Seventh Series	T–70	$2		Judah P. Benjamin; Keatinge & Ball (Columbia, S.C.) (~944,000 issued)
Seventh Series	T–71	$1		Clement Claiborne Clay; Keatinge & Ball (Columbia, S.C.) (~681,500 issued)
Seventh Series	T–72	$0.50		Jefferson Davis; Archer & Halpin (Richmond, VA) (~1,100,000 issued)

== See also ==
- Economy of the Confederate States of America
- Fourteenth Amendment to the United States Constitution § Section 4: Validity of public debt, which banned the Federal recognition of the Confederate States debts or currency
- Samuel C. Upham, a notorious counterfeiter of Confederate bills
- Vermonter currency
- Texas dollar
- Hawaiian dollar

== Bibliography ==
- Cuhaj, George S. (December 28, 2012). Confederate States Paper Money. Krause Publications. ISBN 978-1-4402-3086-8.
- "Seigniorage in the Civil War South. Explorations in Economic History". Explorations in Economic History. 72: 74–92. April 2019. doi:10.1016/j.eeh.2018.11.001. S2CID 92991941.
- Fricke, Pierre (2005). Collecting Confederate Paper Money - Field Edition 2008. Spink. ISBN 978-0-9710821-5-1.
- Fricke, Pierre (December 2, 2013). Collecting Confederate Paper Money - Field Edition 2014. Pierre Fricke. ISBN 978-0-9844534-9-8.
- Friedberg, Arthur L.; Friedberg, Ira S. (2013). Paper Money of the United States: A Complete Illustrated Guide With Valuations (20th ed.). Coin & Currency Institute. ISBN 978-0-87184-520-7.
- Levi, Harold; Corell, George (2006). The Lovett Cent; a Confederate Story. Lulu.com. ISBN 978-1-84728-878-3.
- Hessler, Gene (1993). The Engraver's Line – An Encyclopedia of Paper Money & Postage Stamp Art. BNR Press. ISBN 978-0-931960-36-9.
- Matthews, James M. (1862). Public Laws of the Confederate States of America Passed at the First-Fourth Sessions of the Second Congress.
- Yeoman, R. S. (June 1, 2004). A Guide Book of United States Coins. ISBN 978-0-7948-1790-9.
- Hudgeons, Tom; Hudgeons, Marc (June 1, 2004). 2005 Blackbook Price Guide to United States Paper Money. ISBN 978-1-4000-4839-7.
