= Gallego Flour Mills =

Flour mill in Richmond, Virginia, U.S.

Coordinates: 37.533266°N 77.434991°W

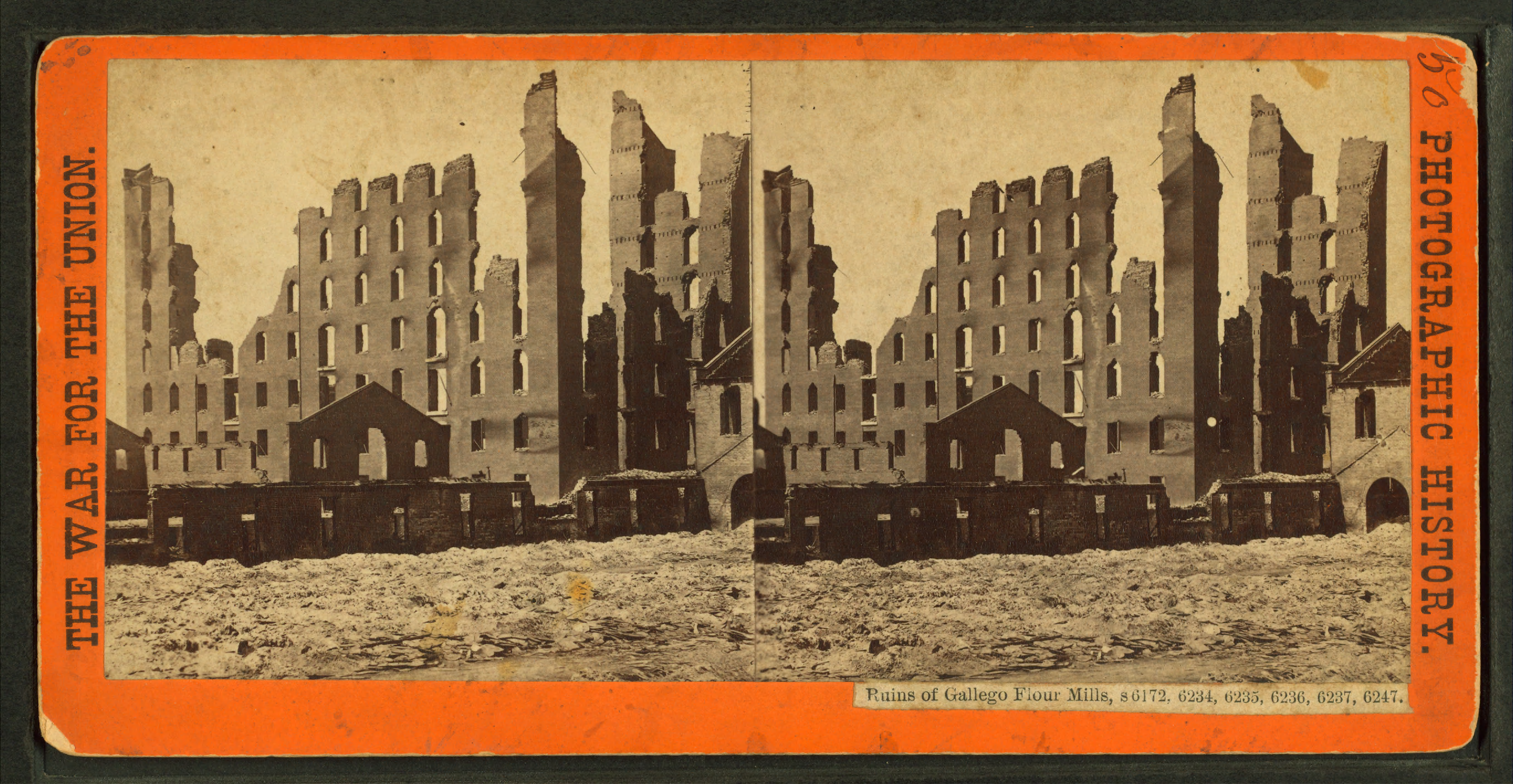
Ruins of the Gallego Flour Mills

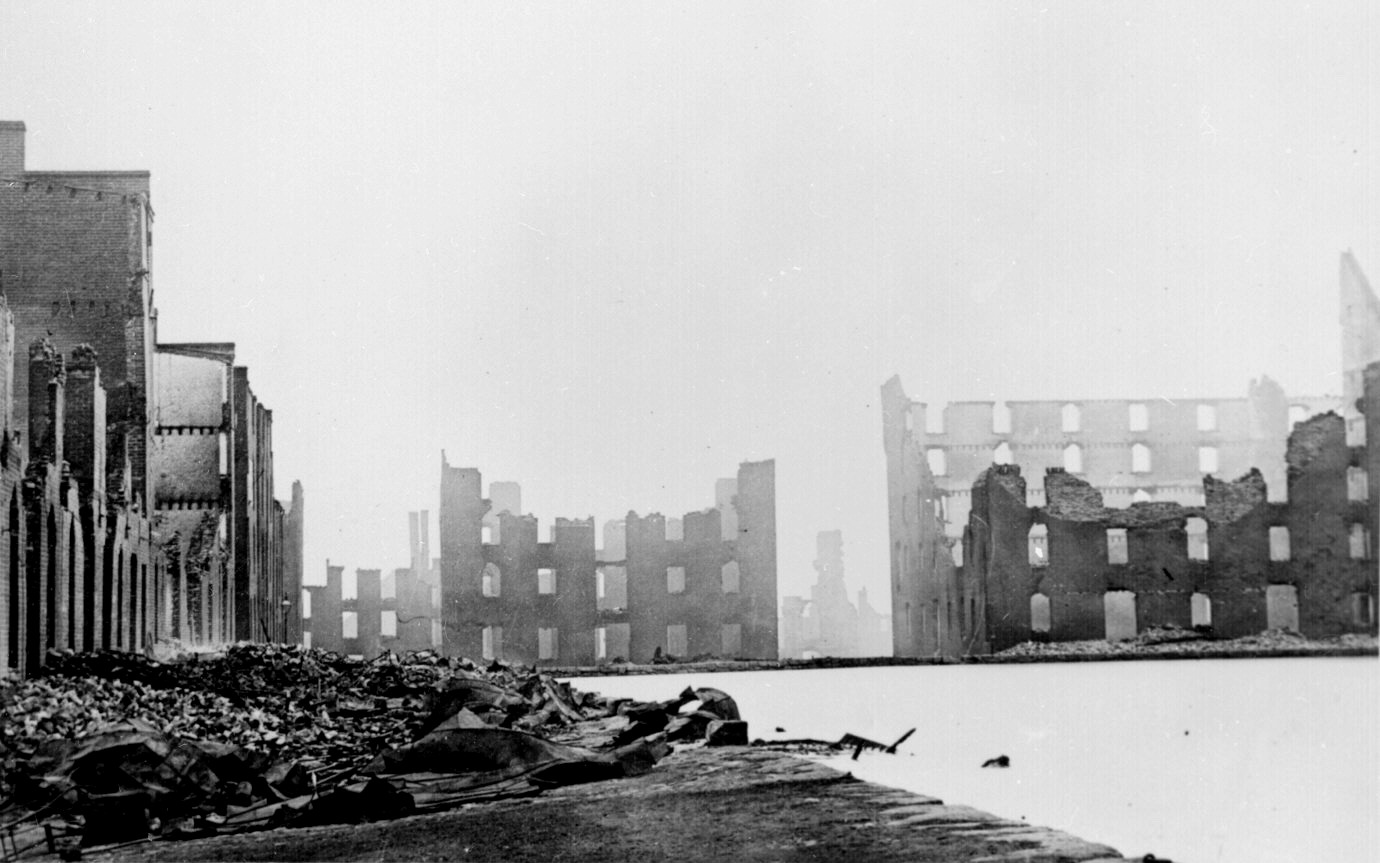
Ruins of the Gallego Mills

The Gallego Flour Mills was a flour mill located in Richmond, Virginia, United States. Founded by Joseph Gallego in the 1790s, the mill gained international reputation for the superior type of flour that was shipped from there to Europe and South America. Further, the mills became iconic image of the defeated south after Mathew Brady shot a photo of the Mills after much of the city burned in 1865.

At the time of their destruction, they were the largest of their kind in the world.
