= Cotton diplomacy =

Trade embargo by Confederate States

Cotton diplomacy was the attempt by the Confederacy during the American Civil War to coerce Great Britain and France to support the Confederate war effort by implementing a cotton trade embargo against Britain and the rest of Europe. The Confederacy believed that both Britain and France, who before the war depended heavily on Southern cotton for textile manufacturing, would support the Confederate war effort if the cotton trade were restricted. Ultimately, cotton diplomacy did not work in favor of the Confederacy, as European nations largely sought alternative markets to obtain cotton. In fact, the cotton embargo transformed into a self-embargo which restricted the Confederate economy. Ultimately, the growth in the demand for cotton that fueled the antebellum economy did not continue.

== Background ==
Until the American Civil War, cotton was the South's primary product. The Southern economy heavily relied on the continual growth and production of cotton. Southern cotton, also referred to as King Cotton, dominated the global cotton supply. By the late 1850s, Southern cotton accounted for 77 percent of the 800 million pounds of cotton consumed in Britain, 90 percent of the 192 million pounds used in France, 60 percent of the 115 million pounds spun in the German Zollverein, and as much as 92 percent of the 102 million pounds manufactured in Russia.

== History ==
In 1858 Senator James Hammond of South Carolina bluntly declared that without cotton,

"old England would topple headlong and carry the whole civilized world with her.... No, you dare not make war on cotton. No power on earth dares to make war upon it. Cotton is king."

This faith in King Cotton further added to the South's confidence in American cotton as economically dominant and as a global necessity.

On April 16, 1861, U.S. President Abraham Lincoln ordered a blockade of Confederate ports to weaken the Confederacy's economy. Confederate President Jefferson Davis and his cabinet realized the Confederates could not compete economically with the Union because cotton exports served as the primary economic driver of the Confederate economy. The blockade restricted naval and merchant access to Confederate ports. It proved highly effective, decreasing cotton "exports to Europe from 3.8 million bales in 1860 to virtual nothing in 1862", and eventually stagnating the Confederacy's economy. By late 1861 the Confederate Congress believed that the best way to remove the Union blockade was through cotton diplomacy, or a cotton embargo. De facto popular cotton diplomacy stopped Southern cotton exports to Britain and Europe in 1861 "to coerce European intervention by withholding all exports of raw cotton or attempt to create a cartel that would reduce the quantity of exports to a level that earned monopoly profits." In doing so, the Confederacy hoped to gain valuable allies to fight alongside them during the Civil War, or to generate enough profit from cotton to sustain the war effort.

In 1860, Europe consumed 3,759,480 bales of American cotton and held 584,280 bales of American cotton in reserve, compared to a mere 474,440 bales of East Indian cotton consumed by Europe and Britain. Britain accounted for 366,329 bales of American cotton in reserve of the 584,280 bales across all of Europe. Davis and the Confederacy believed "King Cotton's" dominance of the global cotton supply would force Britain and France to support the Confederate war effort in order to access cotton. Davis' intuition proved true insofar as many manufacturers in Liverpool and Manchester demanded "government recognition of the Confederacy", while in France "delegations of cotton merchants and manufacturers converged on Paris to press the government to help make U.S. cotton accessible again . . . and pleaded with Napoleon to recognize the Confederacy and to bring the blockade to an end".

The cotton embargo contributed to a cotton famine in Lancashire and to a sharp drop in cotton supply from 1861 to 1862, decreasing the consumption and stock of American cotton in Britain and Europe from 3,039,350 bales to 337,700 bales and from 477,263 bales to 67,540 bales, respectively. However, Britain and France remained determined to maintain neutrality in the American Civil War. London worried about "the fate of its Canadian provinces, and its growing dependence on wheat and corn imports from the United States". Continental Europe "had an interest in maintaining a strong United States to balance British economic and military power". Britain and continental Europe found other cotton supplies and in 1862 began importing cotton from Egypt and from the East Indies. Consumption of East Indian cotton increased from 742,390 bales to 1,034,865 bales and the stock decreased from 372,130 bales to 316,590 bales to help alleviate the cotton shortage. In 1865 the consumption of East Indian cotton increased by 400,000 bales, indicating a decisive and forced substitution of cotton suppliers to Europe and Britain. However, this did not recover all the deficit of American cotton. And East Indian and Egyptian cotton "was used only reluctantly and appeared likely to continue in a supporting role for the foreseeable future".

== See also ==
- Diplomacy of the American Civil War
- King Cotton
- Lancashire Cotton Famine
- Economy of the Confederate States of America
- Blockade runners of the American Civil War – how Confederate cotton was shipped to Britain.
