= Samuel C. Upham =

American counterfeiter (1819–1885)

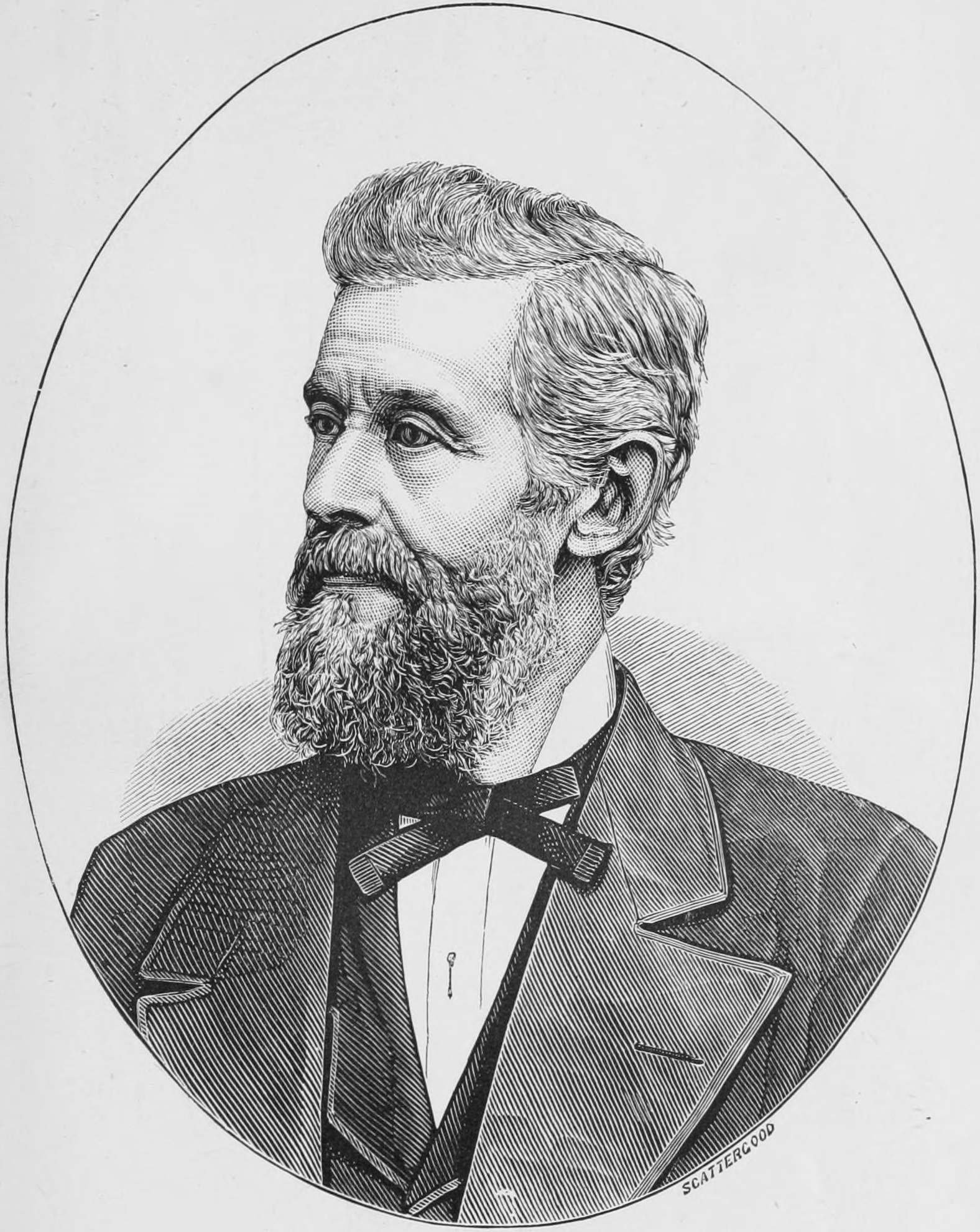
- Born: February 2, 1819; Montpelier, Vermont, U.S.
- Died: June 29, 1885 (aged 66); Philadelphia, Pennsylvania
- Other names: Samuel Curtis Upham, "Honest Sam" Upham
- Occupations: Journalist, lyricist, merchant, bookkeeper, clerk, navy officer, prospector, counterfeiter
- Known for: Counterfeiting Confederate currency bills as souvenirs during the Civil War

Samuel Curtis Upham (February 2, 1819 – June 29, 1885) was an American journalist, lyricist, merchant, bookkeeper, clerk, navy officer, prospector, and counterfeiter, during the later part of the 19th century, sometimes, known as "Honest Sam Upham".

== Early life ==
Samuel Curtis Upham was born in Montpelier, Vermont to Samuel Upham and Sally Hatch, a zealous Methodist farm couple. Upham left home at the age of 20, abandoning his family's hopes he would go into farming or blacksmithing, instead finding work in New York City as a clerk. In 1842 he joined the navy, achieving the rating of master's mate before his discharge three years later. After the navy, he worked as a bookkeeper in Philadelphia, where he met and married Anne Bancroft.

== California ==
In January 1849, Upham sailed on the brig Osceola, to San Francisco, via Rio de Janeiro and Talcahuano, Chile, arriving in California on August 5, 1849, and participating in the California Gold Rush. Proving unsuccessful as a gold miner, Upham moved to Sacramento and founded the Sacramento Transcript, California's first daily newspaper published outside San Francisco. Becoming homesick in 1850, he sold his shares in the newspaper and travelled back to Philadelphia.

Upham later wrote about his adventures in Notes of a Voyage to California via Cape Horn, published in 1878. In the book he writes, "Descriptions of a life on the ocean wave read vary prettily on shore, but the reality of a sea voyage speedily dispels the romance." The book also pays close attention to the bawdy history of Sacramento, and includes lengthy appendices on California journalism and the California exhibition at the 1876 Centennial. In 1878 Upham also published Scenes in El Dorado in the Years 1849-50.

On returning to Philadelphia Upham resumed his family role, fathering two sons and supporting his wife and children with a stationery and toiletries shop. On March 20, 1860, he became one of the founder shareholders in the People's Pacific Railroad Company.

== Civil War ==
At the start of the Civil War Upham began marketing patriotic items to support the Union, and novelty items mocking the Confederacy, such as cards depicting the head of Confederate President Jefferson Davis on the body of a jackass. In February 1862, he acquired a sample of Confederate money and quickly started producing his own counterfeits. His first printing consisted of 3,000 five-dollar notes, each stamped at the bottom with the words, "Fac-simile Confederate Note – Sold wholesale and retail by S.C. Upham 403 Chestnut Street, Philadelphia." He sold his first batch for a penny per copy. Cotton smugglers in the south quickly began buying Upham's novelty notes, trimming off the notice at the bottom and flooding the Confederate economy with the bogus bills.

Before long Upham was advertising what he called "mementos of the Rebellion" in the New York Tribune, Harper's Weekly, and other papers. He also advertised himself willing to buy genuine Confederate notes and stamps, as samples he could later duplicate. By late 1862 Upham was selling twenty-eight variations of Confederate bill denominations and postage stamps, with currency notes selling for five cents apiece. At some point Upham also switched from letter stock to high-quality banknote paper for his forgeries.

Upham's operation caused a dilemma for the Union government, as some members of Lincoln's administration genuinely feared that to permit an enterprise like Upham's to carry on from the North would provoke southerners to retaliate by counterfeiting northern currency. But the Union government did not possess any legal means to stop Upham – because the Union government did not recognize the legitimacy of the Confederate government, they could not prosecute someone for counterfeiting Confederate currency. So at first, Union officials simply tried to persuade Upham to cease operations – however, when he declined Upham soon found himself under investigation by these same officials, who alleged he was counterfeiting Union currency as well. Upham vehemently denied this claim, but likely would have gone to trial had U.S. Secretary of War Edwin Stanton not personally intervened to dismiss the case. Some conspiracy theorists allege Stanton was also Upham's source for genuine banknote paper, in a deliberate effort to destabilize the Confederate economy.

The Congress of the Confederacy responded to the flood of counterfeit bills by imposing the death sentence on convicted counterfeiters. Upham would later brag the Confederacy put a $10,000 reward on his capture, dead or alive. He later wrote, "During the publication of those facsimile notes I was the 'best abused man' in the Union. Senator Foote, in a speech before the rebel Congress, at Richmond, in 1862, said I had done more to injure the Confederate cause than General McClellan and his army..."

Upham later claimed he had "printed from March 12, 1862, to August 1, 1863, one million five hundred and sixty four thousand facsimile Rebel notes, of denominations ranging from five cents to one hundred dollars, and presume the aggregate issue, in dollars and cents, would amount to the round number of fifteen millions of dollars". Some modern analyses estimate his fake Confederate money amounted to between .93% and 2.78% of the Confederacy's total money supply.

By the end of the war other printers were making and selling their own counterfeit bills, prompting Upham to lower his prices. The complete devaluation of genuine Confederate currency by later war years further cut into his business. Southerners were largely eschewing Confederate notes, instead relying on barter or northern bills. CSA notes were rarely used after the fall of Vicksburg (July 1863) west of the Mississippi because of the difficulty of transporting notes across the Union controlled river. Mr. Jones, from his post war book "Life of a Rebel Clerk" states that Mr. CC Thayer (a signer of many CSA notes) tried to transport a large amount of CSA notes from Mississippi to Texas (CSA's Department of the Trans-Mississippi) but failed and returned to Richmond in late 1863.

Upham discontinued his facsimile business in late 1863 and returned to selling stationery, perfume, and hair dye. His notes were still being used in the war-torn South by Union soldiers and other persons after he shut down his business.

== Post-war and death ==
In his later years Upham wrote lyrics for a number of hymns. He penned the words to Centennial ode, Song and chorus (1875), Columbia's centennial greeting, A cantata (1876), and The Old School House down by the Mill (1877).

When Upham died of stomach cancer in 1885, a minor mystery ensued over the whereabouts of his wealth. His estate was valued at $4,889.97, but he claimed to have sold upwards of $50,000 worth of counterfeit notes during the war. The proceeds of his counterfeiting operation have never been found.

== Collectibles ==
Since his death many of Upham's counterfeit bills and postage stamps, and some of the perfume bottles he patented and used in his stationery and perfume business, have become valuable collector's items.
