= Confederate States War Department =

Government department of the Confederate States of America

- Seal of the Confederate States

Agency overview
- Formed: February 26, 1861
- Dissolved: May 26, 1865
- Jurisdiction: Confederate States Army
- Headquarters: Richmond, Virginia, U.S.

The Confederate States War Department was a cabinet-level department in the government of the Confederate States of America responsible for the administration of the affairs of the Confederate States Army. The War Department was led by the Confederate States secretary of war. During its existence, the War Department was the largest department of the Civil Service in the Confederacy.

== History ==
The War Department was established by Act No. 26 of the Confederate Provisional Congress on February 26, 1861.

As the Confederacy collapsed, the records of the department were evacuated to Charlotte and stored in a warehouse. They were recovered by federal troops in May 1865.

== Organization ==
=== Key personnel ===
There were twelve key positions in the War Department of which four were filled by civilians and eight by military personnel; these positions were:

- Secretary of War (civilian)
- Adjutant and Inspector General: Gen. Samuel Cooper
- Assistant Secretary of War (civilian): Albert Taylor Bledsoe, John Archibald Campbell
- Chief of the Bureau of War (civilian): Robert Garlick Hill Kean
- Chief of Conscription: Brig. Gen. Gabriel J. Rains, Brig. Gen. Charles W. Field, Brig. Gen. John S. Preston
- Chief of Nitre and Mining: Col. Isaac M. St. John, Col. Richard Morton
- Chief of Ordnance: Brig. Gen. Josiah Gorgas
- Chief Signal Officer: Col. William Norris
- Commissary General of Subsistence: Col. Lucius B. Northrop, Brig. Gen. Isaac M. St. John
- Quartermaster-General: Col. Abraham C. Myers, Brig. Gen. Alexander Lawton
- Surgeon General: Col. Samuel P. Moore
- Commissioner of Prisoner Exchange: Col. Robert Ould, Col. William Norris
- War Department Commissioner of Indian Affairs (civilian): David Hubbard

=== Departments and Bureaus ===
The War Department had several sub-departments in its organization structure:

- Adjutant and Inspector-General's Department: Established by an act of the Confederate Congress on 19 April 1862
- Bureau of Engineers: Established by an act of the Confederate Congress on March 6, 1861
- Bureau of Indian Affairs: Established by two separate acts of the Confederate Provisional Congress on February 21 and March 15, 1861
- Bureau of Foreign Supplies: Established by an act of the Confederate Congress on May 17, 1864
- Bureau of Conscription: Established on December 30, 1862
- Bureau of Prison Camps
- Bureau of Prisoner Exchange: Established on July 12, 1862
- Commissary Department
- Medical Corps
- Nitre and Mining Bureau: Established by an act the Confederate Congress on April 11, 1862. The Niter and Mining Bureau was initially a part of the Bureau of Ordnance, but later became a full independent bureau on April 22, 1862.
- Bureau of Ordnance: Established on April 8, 1861 under Article 44 of the Confederate Army Regulations
- Quartermaster-General Department: Established by an act of the Confederate Provisional Congress on February 26, 1861
- Signals Bureau: Established by an act of the Confederate Congress on 19 April 1862. This bureau was attached to the Adjutant General's office. Edward Porter Alexander was responsible for this corp's establishment. Although officially established in 1862, Alexander had set about the creation of a signal service and had a signal service operational in time for the First Battle of Manassas, months before any comparable Federal counterpart would emerge. The Signal Bureau was also involved in the gathering of intelligence during the course of the war.

== See also ==
- Confederate States Department of the Navy

== Works cited ==
- Bradley, Mark L. (2011). Bluecoats and Tar Heels: Soldiers and Civilians in Reconstruction North Carolina (paperback ed.). Lexington: The University of Kentucky Press. ISBN 978-0-8131-3385-0.
