= P. G. T. Beauregard =

Confederate States Army general (1818–1893)

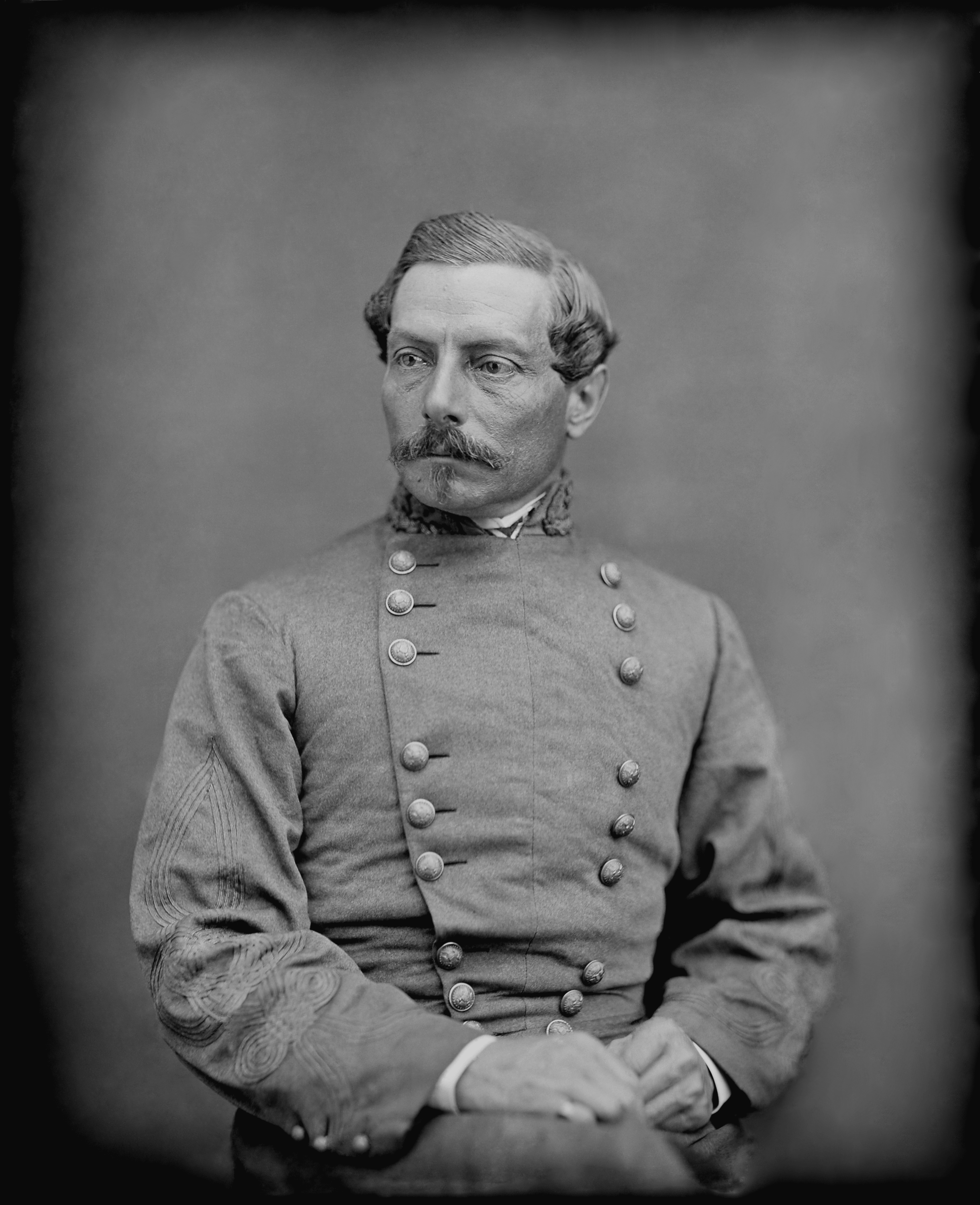
- Portrait by Mathew Brady, c. 1860–1865
- Born: Pierre Gustave Toutant-Beauregard; May 28, 1818; St. Bernard Parish, Louisiana, U.S.
- Died: February 20, 1893 (aged 74); New Orleans, Louisiana, U.S.
- Burial place: Tomb of the Army of Tennessee, Metairie Cemetery, New Orleans, Louisiana, U.S.
- Education: United States Military Academy (BS)
- Spouse: Marie Antoinette Laure Villeré (m. 1841; died 1850) Caroline Deslonde (m. 1851; died 1864)
- Children: 3
- Military career
- Allegiance: United States; Confederate States
- Branch: United States Army; Confederate States Army
- Service years: 1838–1861 (U.S.A.); 1861–1865 (C.S.A.)
- Rank: Captain (U.S.A.); Brevet major (U.S.A.); General (C.S.A.)
- Nicknames: Little Frenchman; Little Napoleon; Little Creole; Bory; Felix; Hero of Fort Sumter
- Commands: Army of the Potomac; Army of Mississippi
- Conflicts: See battles: Mexican–American War; Battle of Contreras; Battle of Churubusco; Battle for Mexico City; Battle of Chapultepec; American Civil War; Firing on Fort Sumter; Battle of Blackburn's Ford; First Battle of Bull Run; Battle of Shiloh; Siege of Corinth; First Battle of Fort Sumter; First Battle of Fort Wagner; Second Battle of Fort Wagner; Second Battle of Fort Sumter; Bermuda Hundred Campaign; Second Battle of Petersburg; Battle of Bentonville

Pierre Gustave Toutant-Beauregard (May 28, 1818 – February 20, 1893) was an American military officer known for being the Confederate general who started the American Civil War at the Battle of Fort Sumter on April 12, 1861. Today, he is commonly referred to as P. G. T. Beauregard, but he rarely used his first name as an adult. He signed correspondence as G. T. Beauregard.

Trained in military and civil engineering at the United States Military Academy, West Point, Beauregard served with distinction as an engineer officer in the Mexican–American War. Following a brief appointment as superintendent of the U.S. Military Academy in 1861, and after Louisiana seceded, he resigned from the United States Army and became the first brigadier general in the Confederate States Army. He commanded the defenses of Charleston, South Carolina, at the start of the Civil War at Fort Sumter on April 12, 1861. Three months later he helped win the First Battle of Manassas near Bull Run Creek.

Beauregard held several key commands in the Western Theater, including control of armies at the Battle of Shiloh in Tennessee, and the Siege of Corinth in northern Mississippi, both in 1862. He returned to Charleston and defended it in 1863 from repeated naval and land attacks by Union forces. He is most known for his defense of the industrial city of Petersburg, Virginia, from Union troops in June 1864, which delayed the eventual fall of the Confederate capital of Richmond, Virginia, in April 1865.

His influence over Confederate strategy was lessened by his poor professional relationships with President Jefferson Davis and other senior generals and officials. In April 1865, Beauregard and his commander, General Joseph E. Johnston, convinced Davis and the remaining cabinet members that the war needed to end. Johnston surrendered most of the remaining armies of the Confederacy, including Beauregard and his men, to Union Major General William Tecumseh Sherman.

After his military career, Beauregard returned to Louisiana, where he advocated Black civil rights including suffrage as a means of voting out Radical Republicans, served as a railroad executive, and became wealthy as a promoter of the Louisiana Lottery.

== Early life and education ==
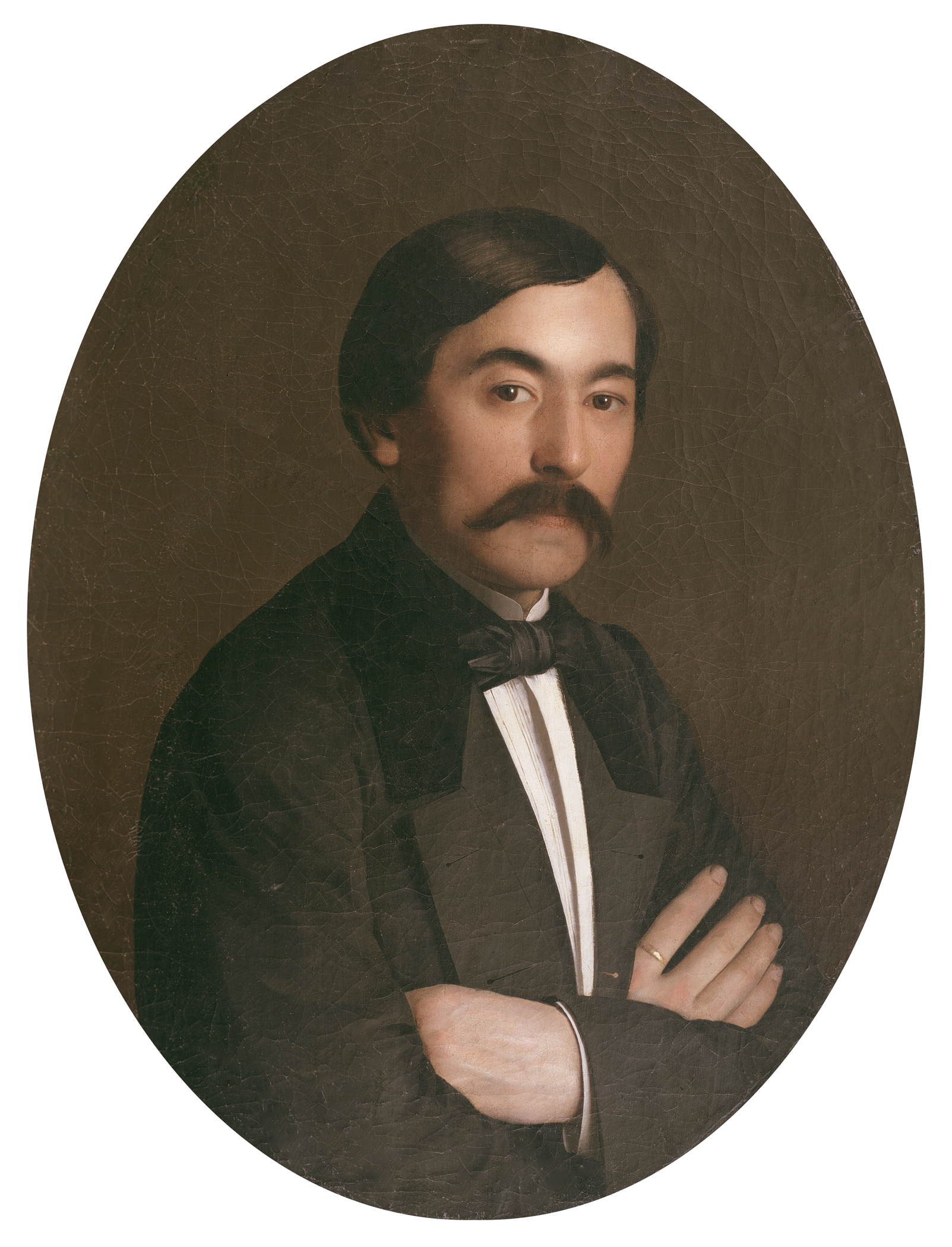
Pierre G. T. Beauregard as a young man, painting by Richard Clague

Beauregard was born at the "Contreras" sugar-cane plantation in St. Bernard Parish, Louisiana, about 20 miles (32 km) outside New Orleans, to a Louisiana Creole family. Beauregard was the third child of Hélène Judith de Reggio, of mixed French and Italian ancestry and descendant of Francesco Maria de Reggio, member of an Italian noble family whose family had migrated first to France and then to Louisiana, and her husband, Jacques Toutant-Beauregard, of French and German ancestry. He had three brothers and three sisters. As was typical for Louisiana Creoles, his family spoke French and practiced Catholicism.

Beauregard had several Creole of color cousins and uncles; the Creole of color side of Beauregard's family came from a marriage between Marguerite Pantalon (daughter of a prominent New Orleans Creole of color family) and one of Beauregard's uncles, Martin Barthelemy Toutant Beauregard.

As a child, he befriended and played with slave boys his own age, including his favorite friend, the tall and strong storyteller Baptiste; Beauregard was often seen following and frolicking by Baptiste's side. Beauregard was nursed by a slave woman from Saint-Domingue (later Haiti) named Mamie Françoise Similien.

Similien and Beauregard had a very close relationship, often seen giving each other hugs and kisses. Similien was held in the Beauregards' highest esteem, and after Pierre's grandfather died, the Beauregard family gave Similien a Creole Cottage in the Faubourg Treme of New Orleans.

Pierre often visited with Mamie, and during an interview with a reporter of the New Orleans Times in 1882, while sharing stories of Pierre's youth and growing up, Mamie pointed to a personal portrait that Pierre gave her during a visit in 1867, saying "that's my son".

Beauregard grew up in a large one-story house, unlike the "later plantation palaces, but a mansion of aristocracy by the standards of its time." He hunted and rode in the woods and fields around his family's plantation and paddled his boat in its waterways. Beauregard attended New Orleans private schools and then went to a "French school" in New York City. During his four years in New York, beginning at age 12, he learned to speak English, as French had been his first and only language in Louisiana.

In 1841, Beauregard married Marie Antoinette Laure Villeré (1823–1850), the daughter of a Louisiana sugarcane planter. The two had three children – Rene (1843–1910), Henri (1845–1915), and Laure (1850–1884). Marie died giving birth to the latter, her only daughter. In 1860, Beauregard married Caroline Deslonde (1831–1864), who died in New Orleans following a long illness.

Beauregard was related to the inventor/firearms engineer and physician Jean Alexandre LeMat, who had married Beauregard's cousin Justine Sophie LePretre in 1849.

=== West Point ===
Beauregard attended the United States Military Academy at West Point, New York. One of his instructors was Robert Anderson, the later commander of Fort Sumter; he surrendered to Beauregard at the start of the Civil War. Upon enrolling at West Point, Beauregard dropped the hyphen from his surname and treated Toutant as a middle name, to fit in with his classmates. From that point on, he rarely used his first name, preferring "G. T. Beauregard."; these name changes also served as part of a process of Americanization. He graduated second in his class in 1838 and excelled both as an artilleryman and military engineer. His Army friends gave him many nicknames: "Little Creole", "Bory", "Little Frenchman", "Felix", and "Little Napoleon".

In February 1845, Beauregard returned to Louisiana, where he moved into the French Quarter of New Orleans, living in a prominent Creole of color neighborhood on St. Louis Street. Beauregard maintained an office on Bourbon Street, where he continued his work for the United States Army Corps of Engineers. In the meantime, he worked on an improved furnace for boiling sugar.

== Early military career ==
=== Mexican-American War ===
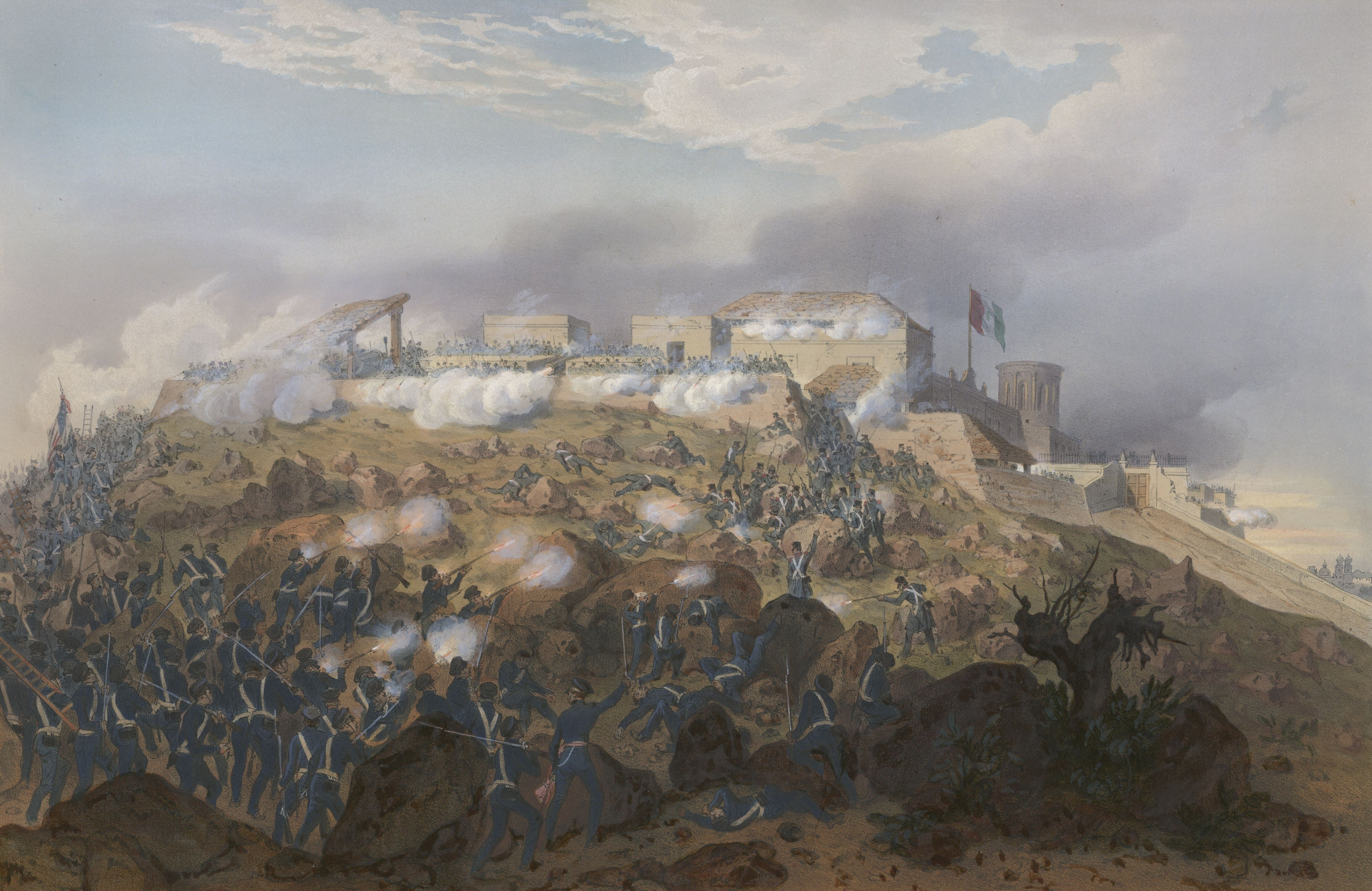
The Battle of Chapultepec, September 13, 1847

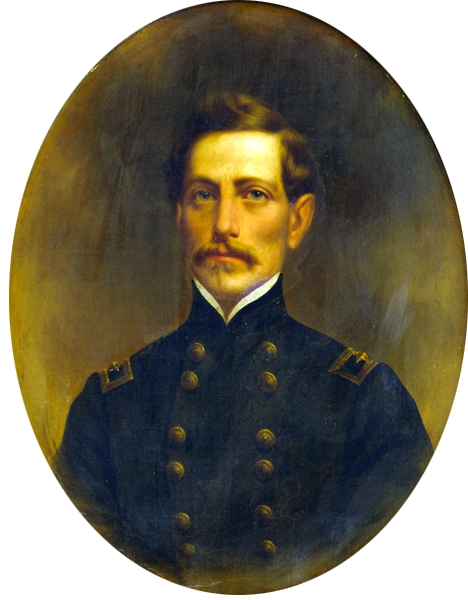
U.S. Army Major P.G.T. Beauregard

During the Mexican–American War, Beauregard served as an engineer under General Winfield Scott. He was appointed brevet captain for the battles of Contreras and Churubusco and major for Chapultepec, where he was wounded in the shoulder and thigh. He was noted for his eloquent performance in a meeting with Scott in which he convinced the assembled general officers to change their plan for attacking the fortress of Chapultepec. He was one of the first officers to enter Mexico City. Beauregard considered his contributions in dangerous reconnaissance missions and devising strategy for his superiors to be more significant than those of his engineer colleague, Captain Robert E. Lee, so he was disappointed when Lee and other officers received more brevets than he did.

=== Return to New Orleans ===
Beauregard returned from Mexico in 1848. For the next 12 years, he was in charge of what the Engineer Department called "the Mississippi and Lake defenses in Louisiana." Much of his engineering work was done elsewhere, repairing old forts and building new ones on the Florida coast and in Mobile, Alabama. He also improved the defenses of Forts St. Philip and Jackson on the Mississippi River below New Orleans. He worked on a board of Army and Navy engineers to improve the navigation of the shipping channels at the mouth of the Mississippi. He created and patented an invention he called a "self-acting bar excavator" to be used by ships in crossing bars of sand and clay. While serving in the Army, he actively campaigned for the election of Franklin Pierce, the Democratic presidential candidate in 1852, and a former general in the Mexican War who had been impressed by Beauregard's performance at Mexico City. Pierce appointed Beauregard as superintending engineer of the U.S. Custom House in New Orleans, a huge granite building that had been built in 1848. As it was sinking unevenly in the moist soil of Louisiana, Beauregard had to develop a renovation program. He served in this position from 1853 to 1860 and stabilized the structure successfully.

==== Peacetime Officer, West Point Superintendent ====
During his service in New Orleans, Beauregard became dissatisfied as a peacetime officer. He informed the U.S. Army Engineer Department late in 1856 that he was going to join the filibuster with William Walker, who had seized control of Nicaragua; he had offered Beauregard the rank of second-in-command of his army. Senior officers, including general-in-chief Winfield Scott, convinced Beauregard to stay in the United States.

Beauregard briefly entered politics as a reform candidate for mayor of New Orleans in 1858, where he was promoted by both the Whig and Democratic parties to challenge the Know Nothing party candidate. Beauregard was narrowly defeated.

Employing the political influence of his brother-in-law, John Slidell, Beauregard obtained an appointment as superintendent of the U.S. Military Academy on January 23, 1861. However, when Louisiana seceded from the Union, the Federal Government immediately revoked his orders and he subsequently relinquished his office after only five days. He protested to the U.S. War Department that they had cast "improper reflection upon [his] reputation or position in the Corps of Engineers" by forcing him out as a Southern officer before any hostilities began.

== Civil War ==
=== First CSA General ===
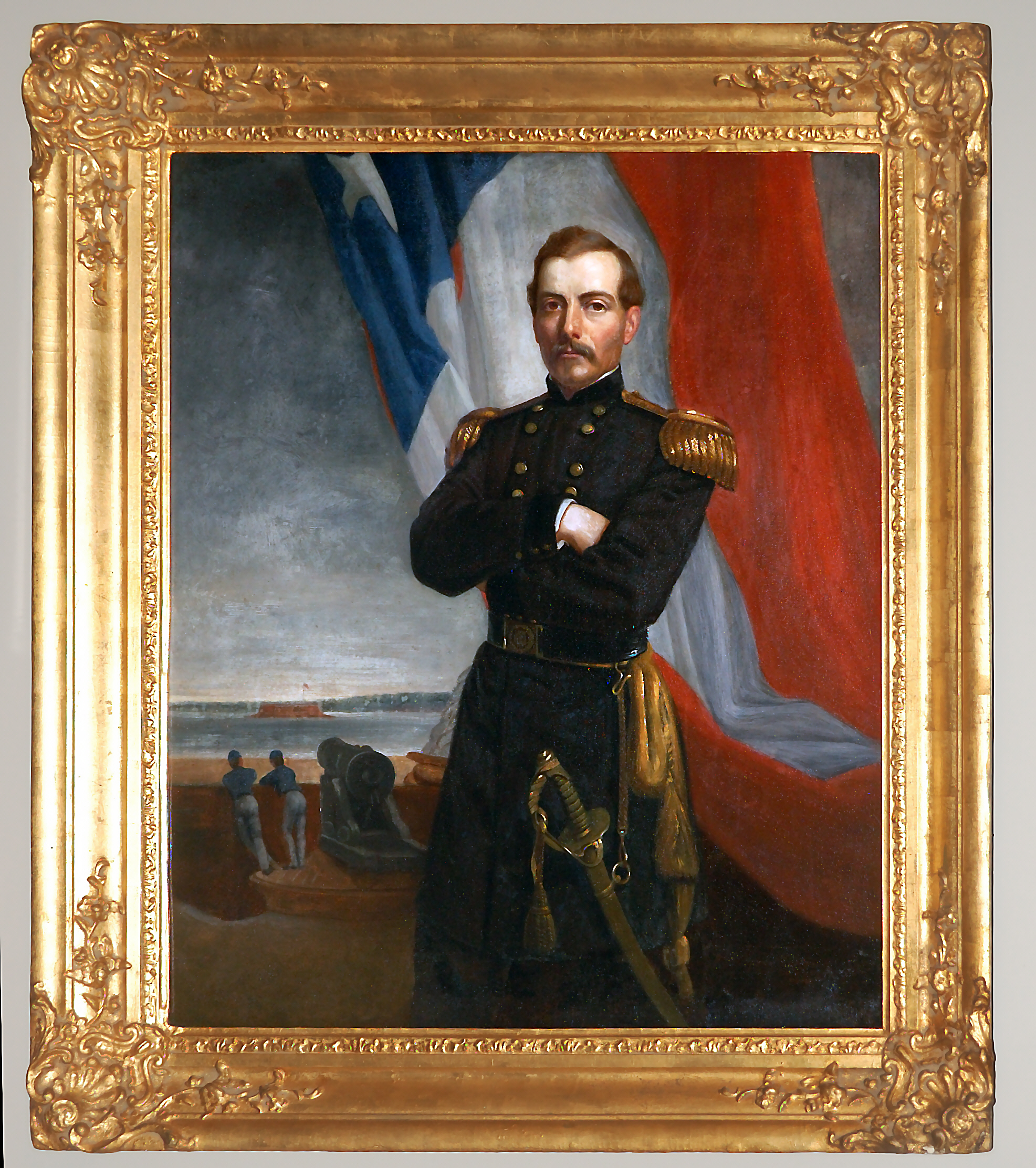
General P. G. T. Beauregard

On first meeting, most people were struck by [Beauregard's] "foreign" appearance. His skin was smooth and olive-complexioned. His eyes, half-lidded, were dark, with a trace of Gallic melancholy about them. His hair was black (though by 1860 he maintained this hue with dye). He was strikingly handsome and enjoyed the attentions of women, but probably not excessively or illicitly. He sported a dark mustache and goatee, and he rather resembled Napoleon III, then ruler of France—although he often saw himself in the mold of the more celebrated Napoleon Bonaparte.

— David Detzer, Allegiance.

Beauregard traveled by steamship from New York to New Orleans and immediately began giving military advice to the local authorities in his home state of Louisiana, which included further strengthening Forts St. Philip and Jackson, which guarded the Mississippi approaches to New Orleans. He hoped to be named commander of the Louisiana state army, but was disappointed that the state legislature appointed Braxton Bragg. Aware that Beauregard might resent him, Bragg offered him the rank of colonel. Instead Beauregard enrolled as a private in the "Orleans Guards", a battalion of French Creole aristocrats. At the same time, he communicated with Slidell and the newly chosen President Davis, angling for a senior position in the new Confederate States Army. Rumors that Beauregard would be placed in charge of the entire Army infuriated Bragg. Concerned about the political situation regarding the Federal presence at Fort Sumter in Charleston Harbor, Davis selected Beauregard to take command of Charleston's defenses. Beauregard seemed the perfect combination of military engineer and charismatic Southern leader needed at that time and place.

Beauregard became one of the most frequently described generals in Confederate chronicles, and almost all of which noted his foreign French visage. Biographer T. Harry Williams describes the Beauregard gave as "courteous, grave, sometimes reserved and severe, sometimes abrupt with people who displeased him." Many compared his appearance to that of a French marshal. Beauregard was accompanied by a sizable military staff, which included many former politicians serving as aides. He received gifts from admiring women across the Confederacy, which fueled rumors about womanizing, some of which had anti-Creole bases.

Beauregard became the first Confederate general officer, appointed a brigadier general in the Provisional Army of the Confederate States on March 1, 1861. (On July 21, he was promoted to full general in the Confederate Army, one of only seven appointed to that rank; his date of rank made him the fifth most senior general, behind Samuel Cooper, Albert Sidney Johnston, Robert E. Lee, and Joseph E. Johnston.)

==== Start of the Civil War, Fort Sumter ====
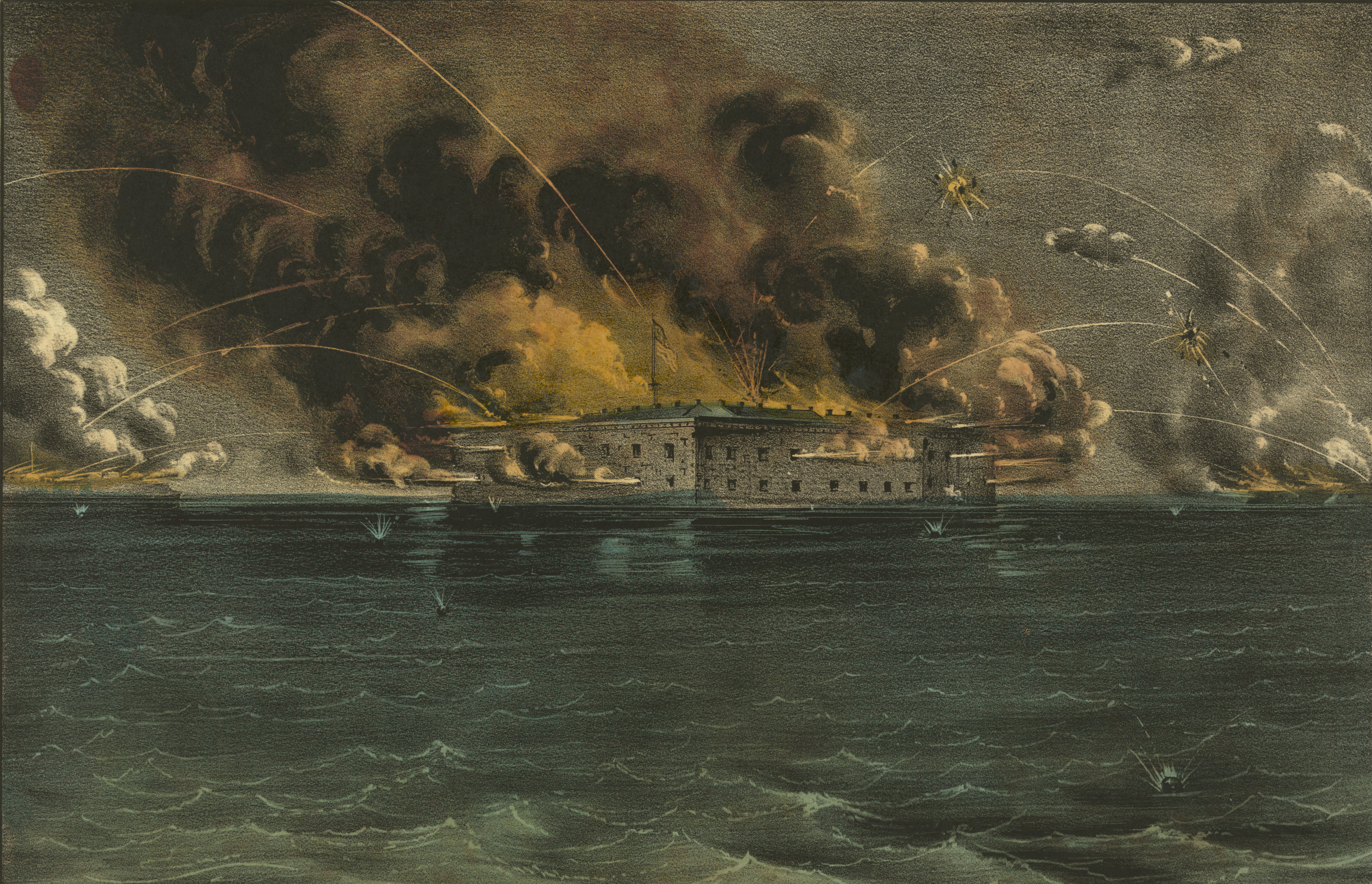
The Battle of Fort Sumter, April 12–13, 1861

The CSA Flag

Arriving in Charleston on March 3, 1861, Beauregard met with Governor Francis Wilkinson Pickens and inspected the defenses of the harbor, which he found to be in disarray. He was said to display "a great deal in the way of zeal and energy ... but little professional knowledge and experience." Major Robert Anderson at Fort Sumter wrote to Washington, D.C., that Beauregard, who had been his student at West Point in 1837, would guarantee that South Carolina's actions be exercised with "skill and sound judgment." Beauregard wrote to the Confederate government that Anderson was a "most gallant officer". He sent several cases of fine brandy and whiskey and boxes of cigars to Anderson and his officers at Sumter, but Anderson ordered that the gifts be returned.

By early April, political tensions were mounting and Beauregard demanded that Sumter surrender before the arrival of a planned Union expedition to re-provision the fort. Early on the morning of April 12, negotiations with Anderson had failed. Beauregard ordered the first shots of the American Civil War to be fired from nearby Fort Johnson. The bombardment of Fort Sumter lasted for 34 hours. After a heavy bombardment from batteries ringing the harbor, Anderson surrendered Fort Sumter on April 14. Biographer T. Harry Williams described the extravagant praise from throughout the Confederacy that "The Hero of Fort Sumter" received for his victory: "He was the South's first paladin."

=== First Bull Run (First Manassas) ===
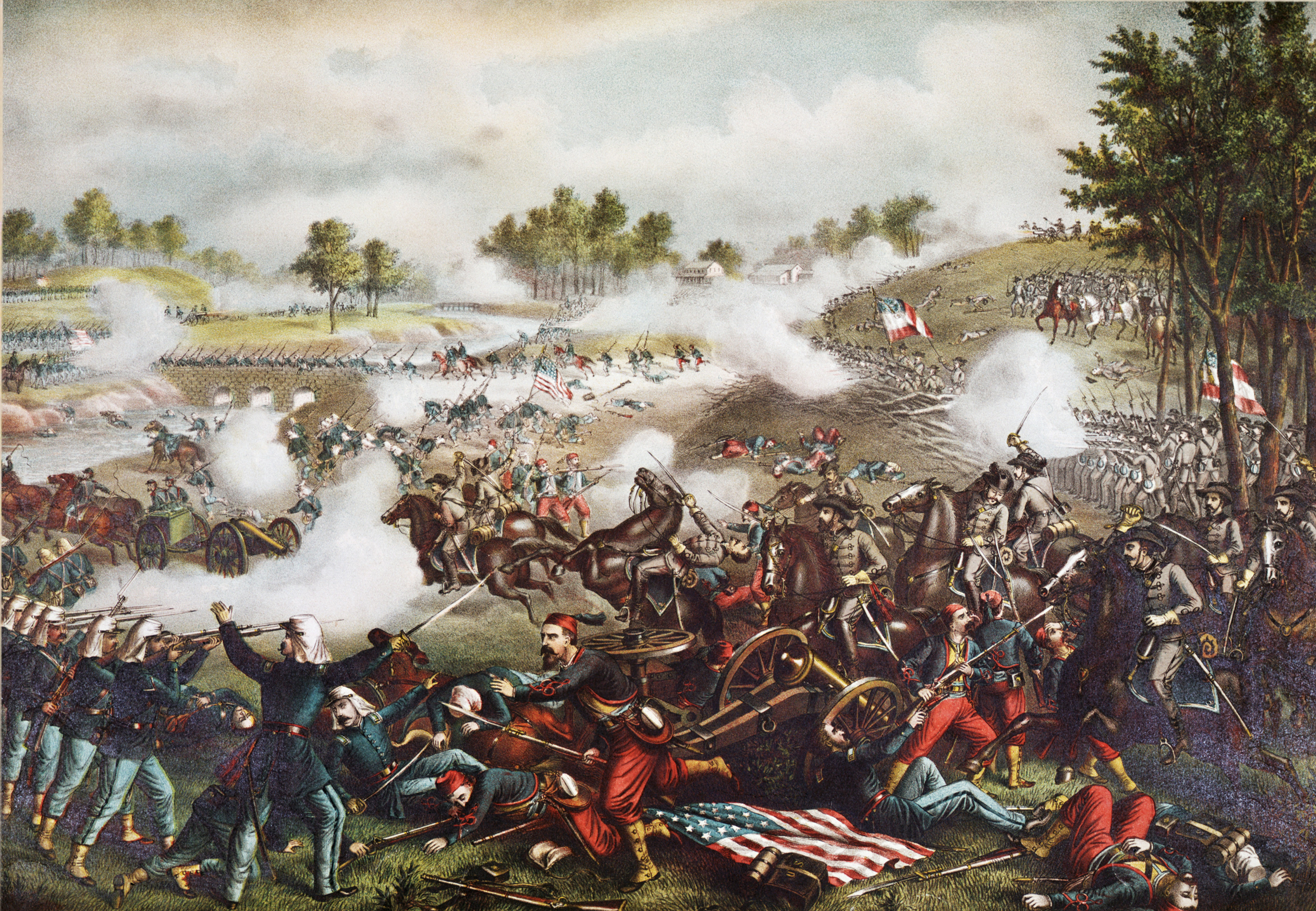
The Battle of First Manassas, July 21, 1861

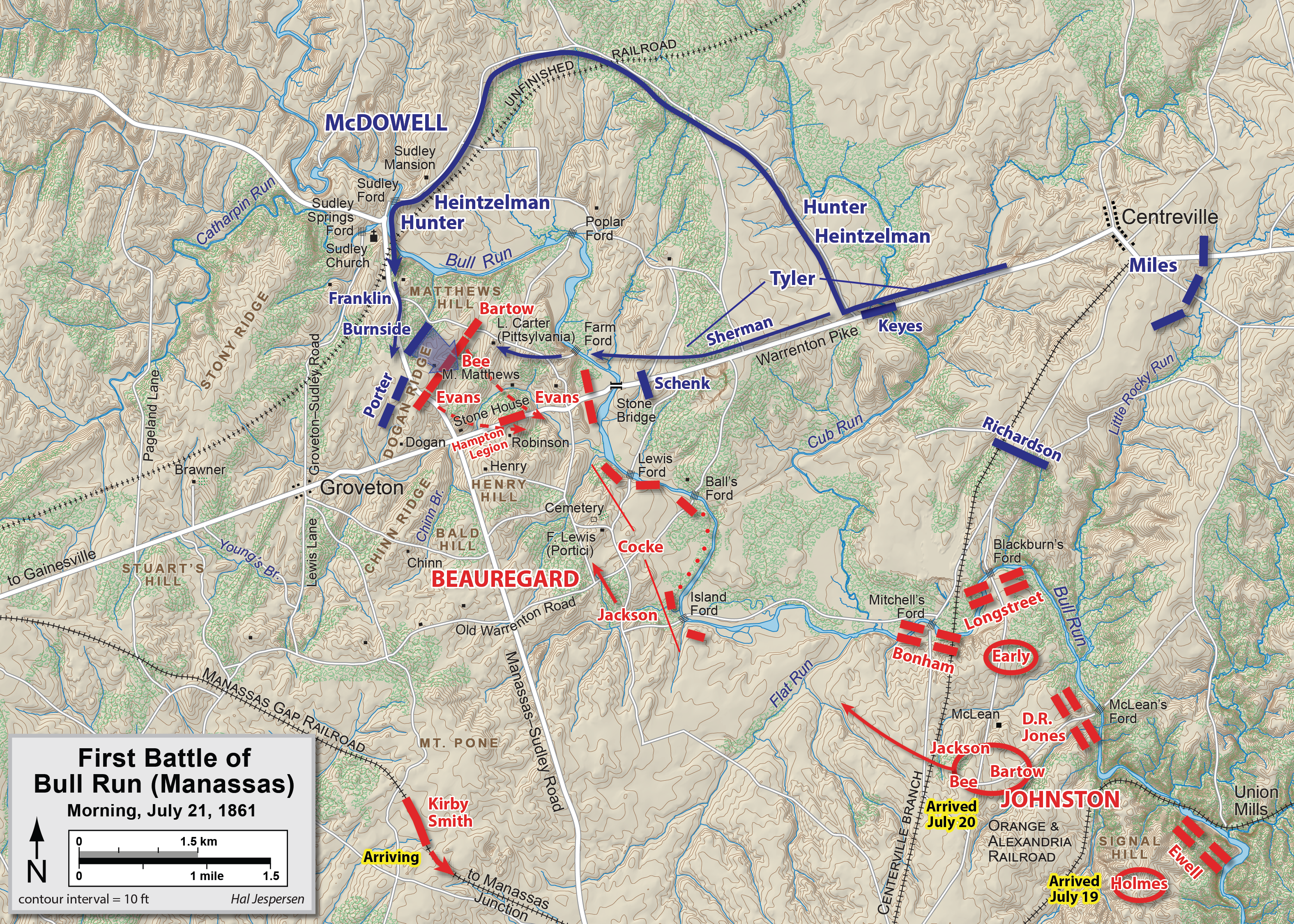
Start of the First Battle of Manassas

Summoned to the new Confederate capital of Richmond, Virginia, Beauregard received a hero's welcome at the railroad stations along the route. He was given command of the "Alexandria Line" of defenses against an impending Federal offensive that was being organized by Brig. Gen. Irvin McDowell (one of Beauregard's West Point classmates) against the Confederate railroad junction at Manassas. Beauregard devised strategies to concentrate the forces of (full) General Joseph E. Johnston from the Shenandoah Valley with his own, aiming not only to defend his position, but to initiate an offensive against McDowell and Washington. Despite his seniority in rank, Johnston lacked familiarity with the terrain and ceded tactical planning of the impending battle to Beauregard as a professional courtesy. President Davis considered many of Beauregard's plans to be impractical for an army as inexperienced as the Confederates could field in 1861; throughout the war, Davis and Beauregard would argue about Beauregard's tendencies to devise grand strategies based on formal military principles. Davis believed he lacked a pragmatic grasp of logistics, intelligence, relative military strengths, and politics.

The First Battle of Bull Run (First Manassas) began early on July 21, 1861, with an element of surprise for both armies—both McDowell and Beauregard planned to envelop their opponent with an attack from their right flank. McDowell struck first, crossing Bull Run and threatening Beauregard's left flank. For a while, Beauregard persisted in moving his troops for an attack on his right flank (McDowell's left, toward Centreville), but Johnston urged him to travel with him to the threatened flank at Henry House Hill, which was weakly defended. Seeing the strength of the Union attack at that point, Beauregard insisted that Johnston leave the area of immediate action and coordinate the overall battle from a position 1.5 miles (2.4 km) to the rear. Beauregard rallied the troops, riding among the men, brandishing regimental colors, and giving inspirational speeches. The Confederate line held.

As Johnston's final troops arrived from the Shenandoah Valley, the Confederates launched a counterattack that routed the Union Army, sending it streaming in disorder back toward Washington.

Frank E. Vandiver writes of the beginning of the battle that

There is no doubt that [Beauregard] verged on hysteria most of the early hours - a dizzying array of orders and counterorders, plans and counterplans, misplaced and castaway units were ample proof of his demoralization.

William C. Davis credits Johnston with the majority of the tactical decisions that led to the victory, judging that

Beauregard acted chiefly as a dime novel general, leading the charge of an individual regiment, riding along the line to cheer the troops, accepting the huzzas of the soldiers and complementing them in turn. The closest he came to a major tactical decision was his fleeting intention to withdraw from the Henry Hill line when he briefly mistook the advance of Johnston's reinforcements for the arrival of fresh Union troops.

Nonetheless, Beauregard received the bulk of the acclaim from the press and general public. On July 23, Johnston recommended to President Davis that Beauregard be promoted to full general. Davis approved, and Beauregard's date of rank was established as the date of his victory, July 21.

==== Confederate battle flag design ====
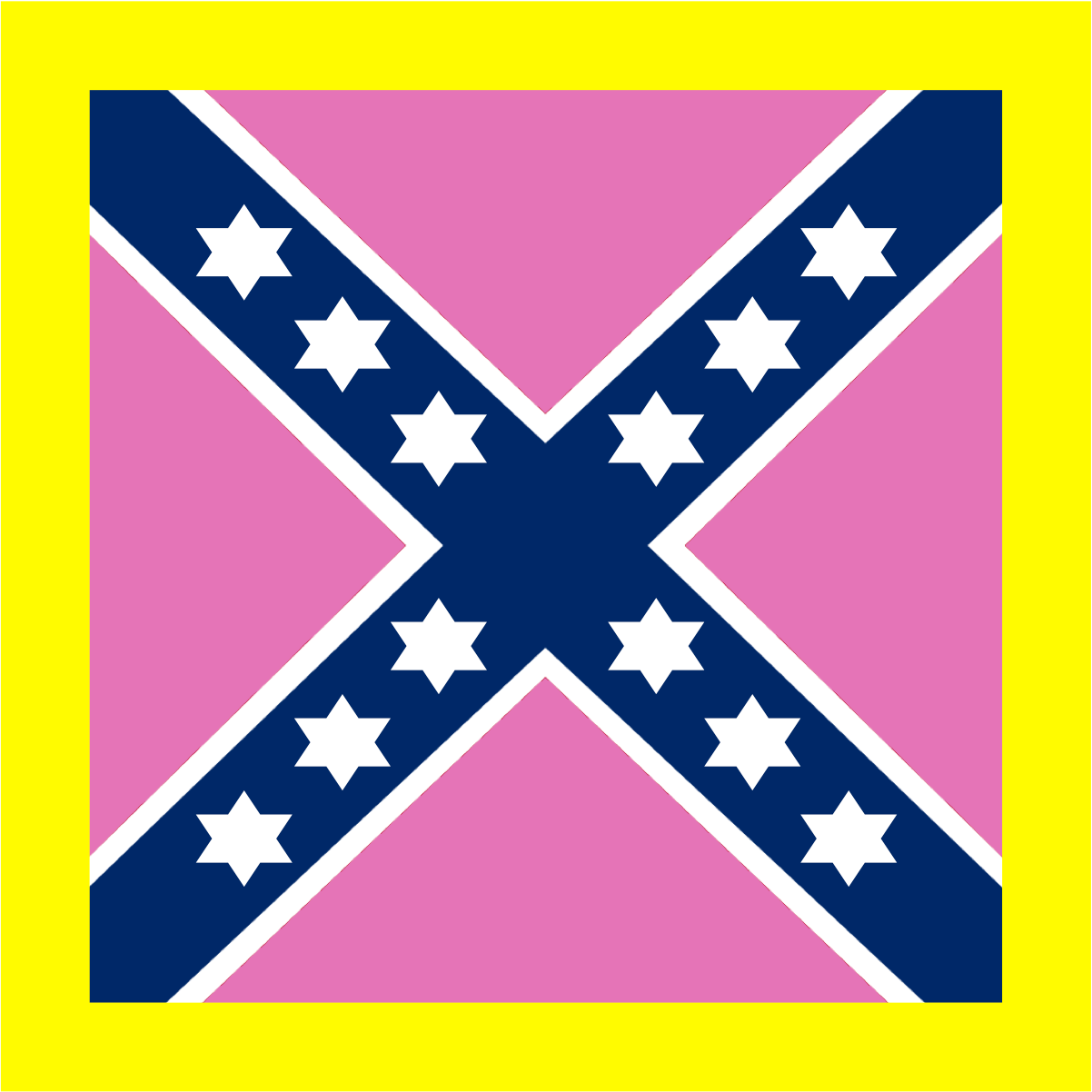
Beauregard's original design of the Confederate battle flag CSA

After Bull Run, Beauregard advocated the use of a standardized battle flag other than the "Stars and Bars" Confederate national flag to avoid visual confusion with the U.S. flag. He worked with Johnston and William Porcher Miles to create the Confederate Battle Flag. Women visiting Beauregard's army contributed silk material from their dresses to create the first three flags, for Beauregard, Johnston, and Earl Van Dorn; thus, the first flags contained more feminine pink than martial red. However, the official battle flag had a red background with white stars. Throughout his career, Beauregard worked to have the flag adopted, and he helped to make it the most popular symbol of the Confederacy.

As the Army went into winter quarters, Beauregard caused considerable friction with the Confederate high command. He strongly advocated an invasion of Maryland to threaten the flank and rear of Washington. With his plan rebuffed as impractical, he requested reassignment to New Orleans, which he assumed would be under Union attack in the near future, but his request was denied. He quarreled with Commissary General Lucius B. Northrop (a personal friend of Davis) about the inadequate supplies available to his army. He issued public statements challenging the ability of the Confederate Secretary of War to give commands to a full general. And he enraged President Davis when his report about Bull Run was printed in the newspaper, which suggested that Davis's interference with Beauregard's plans prevented the pursuit and full destruction of McDowell's army and the capture of Washington.

=== Shiloh and Corinth ===
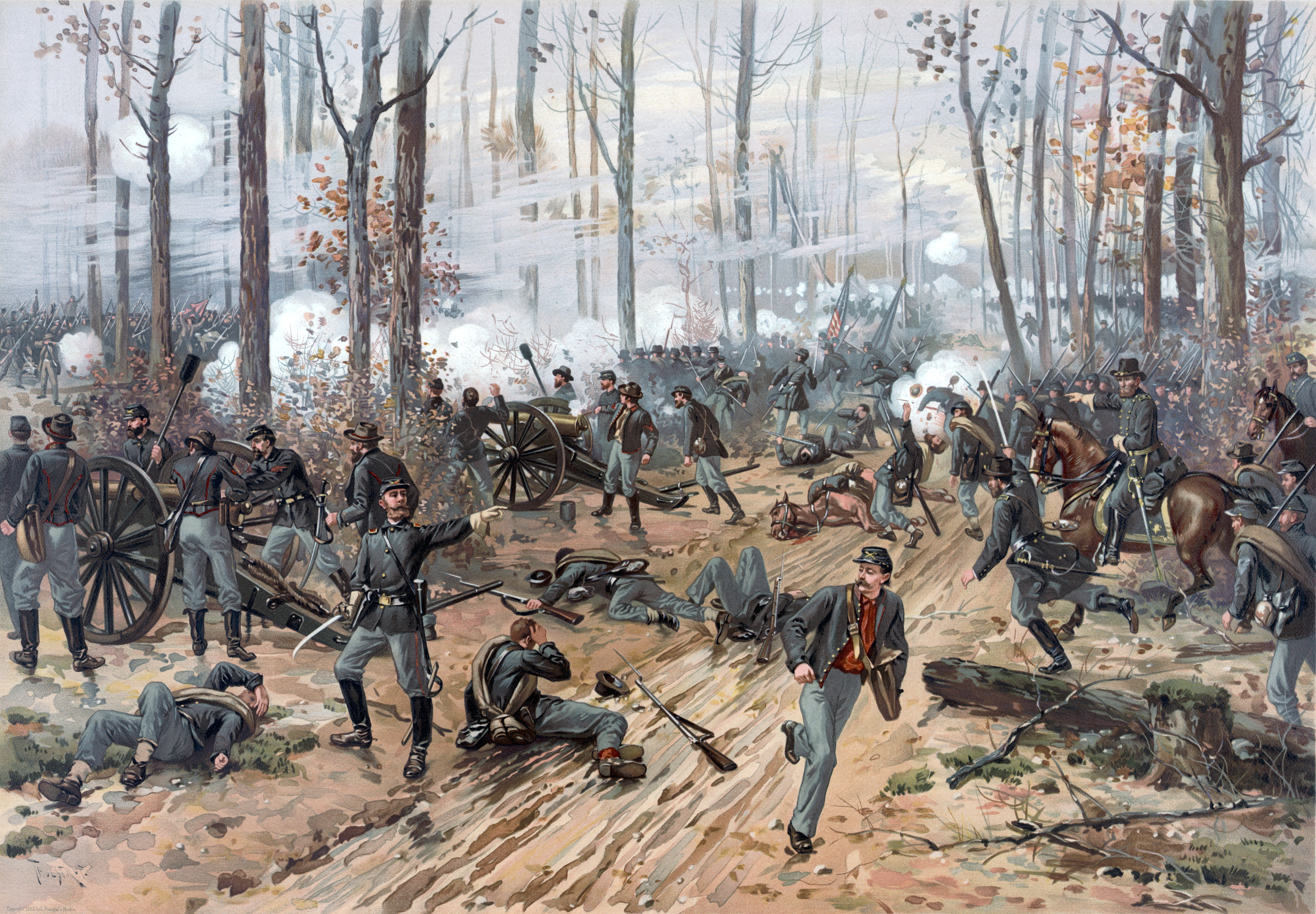
The Battle of Shiloh, April 6–7, 1862

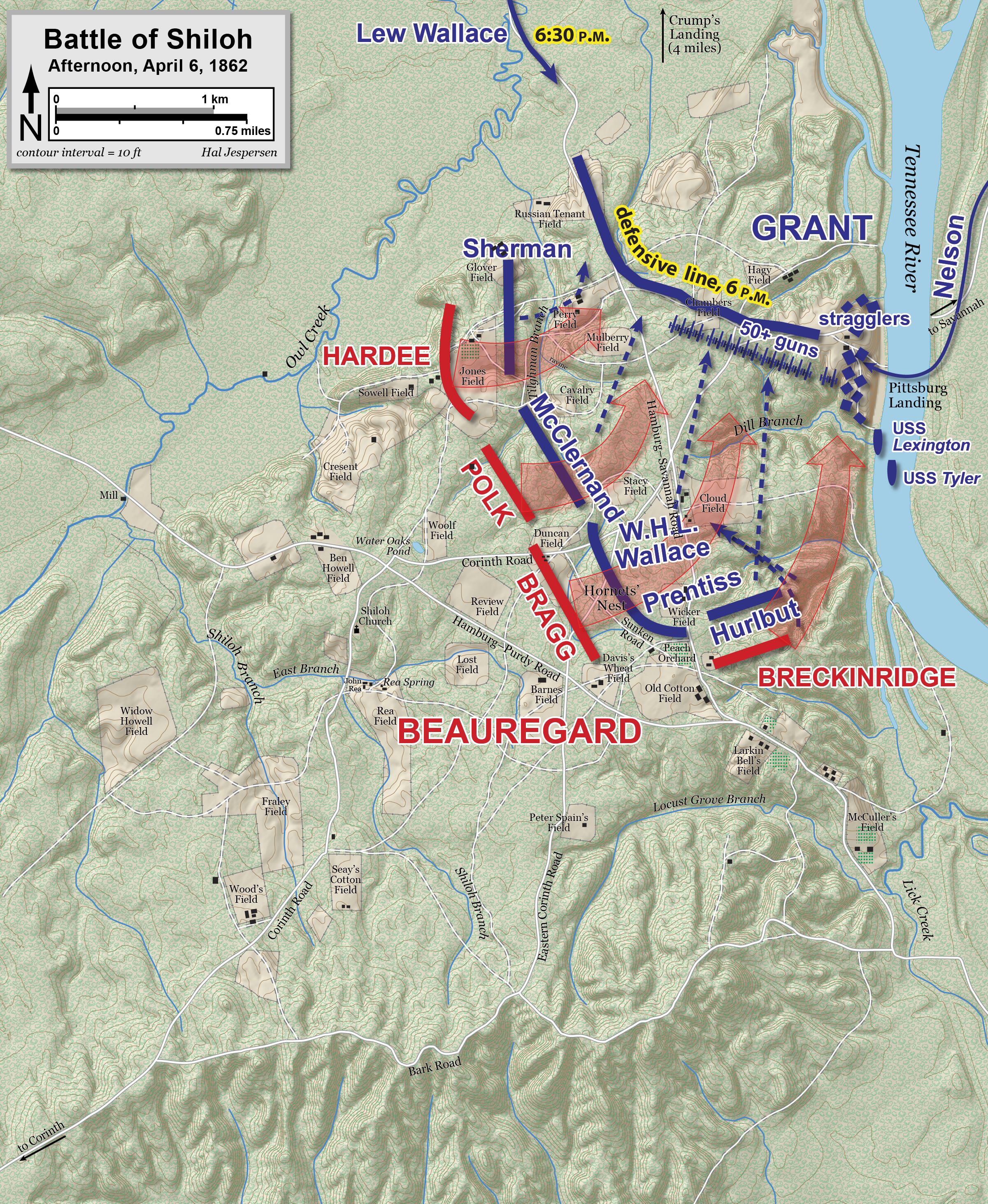
Map of the Battle of Shiloh, afternoon of April 6, 1862, after Beauregard took command

Having become a political liability in Virginia, Beauregard was transferred to Tennessee to become second-in-command to General Albert Sidney Johnston (no relation to Joseph E. Johnston) in his Army of Mississippi, effective March 14, 1862. The two generals planned the concentration of Confederate forces to oppose the advance of Maj. Gen. Ulysses S. Grant before he could combine his army with that of Maj. Gen. Don Carlos Buell in a thrust up the Tennessee River toward Corinth, Mississippi. The march from Corinth was plagued by bad weather, which delayed the army's arrival by several days, and during that time, several contacts were made with Union scouts. Because of this, Beauregard felt the element of surprise had been lost and recommended calling off the attack, but Johnston decided to proceed with the plan. In the Battle of Shiloh, which began April 6, 1862, the Confederates launched a surprise attack against Grant's Army of the Tennessee, which despite days of prior reports of Confederate troop movements, were completely unaware that the entire Army of Mississippi was coming directly at them. Once again a more senior general named Johnston deferred to the junior Beauregard in planning the attack. The massive frontal assault was marred by Beauregard's improper organization of forces—successive attacks by corps in lines 3 miles (4.8 km) long, rather than assigning each corps a discrete portion of the line for a side-by-side assault. This arrangement caused intermingling of units and confusion of command; it failed to concentrate mass at the appropriate place on the line to affect the overall objectives of the attack. In midafternoon, Johnston, who was near the front of the battle action, was mortally wounded. Beauregard, positioned in the rear of the army to send reinforcements forward, assumed command of the army and Johnston's overall Western department (officially designated "Department Number Two"). As darkness fell, he chose to call off the attack against Grant's final defensive line, which had contracted into a tight semicircle backed up to the Tennessee River at Pittsburg Landing.

Beauregard's decision was one of the most controversial of the Civil War. Numerous veterans and historians have wondered about the aftermath if the assault had gone forward into the night. Beauregard believed that the battle was essentially won and his men could finish off Grant in the morning. He knew the terrain to be crossed (a steep ravine containing a creek named Dill Branch) was extremely difficult and Grant's defensive line was heavy with massed artillery and supported by gunboats in the river. Unbeknownst to Beauregard, Buell's Army of the Ohio began arriving that afternoon, and he and Grant launched a massive counterattack on April 7. Overwhelmed, the Confederates retreated to Corinth. Beauregard's preliminary report framed the battle as a victory, as did an address to his troops, although Beauregard did express concern to the Confederate government regarding the safety of Corinth and the Mississippi Valley. There was widespread public criticism of Beauregard's handling of Shiloh, which was the first time this had happened to him since the start of the war; many in the general public did not believe the claim of Shiloh as a victory.

Grant was temporarily disgraced by the surprise attack and near defeat, causing his superior, Maj. Gen. Henry W. Halleck, to assume field command of the combined armies. Halleck cautiously and slowly approached Beauregard's fortifications at Corinth; his action became derisively called the Siege of Corinth. Beauregard withdrew from Corinth on May 29 to Tupelo, Mississippi. He was able to deceive Halleck into thinking the Confederates were about to attack; he ran empty trains back and forth through the town while whistles blew and troops cheered as if massive reinforcements were arriving. Beauregard retreated because of the overwhelming Union force and because of contaminated water supplies in Corinth. In April and May, the Confederates lost almost as many men to death by disease in Corinth as had been killed in battle at Shiloh. Nevertheless, his leaving the critical rail junction at Corinth without a fight was another controversial decision. When Beauregard went on medical leave without requesting permission in advance, President Davis relieved him of command and replaced him with Gen. Braxton Bragg.

=== Return to Charleston ===
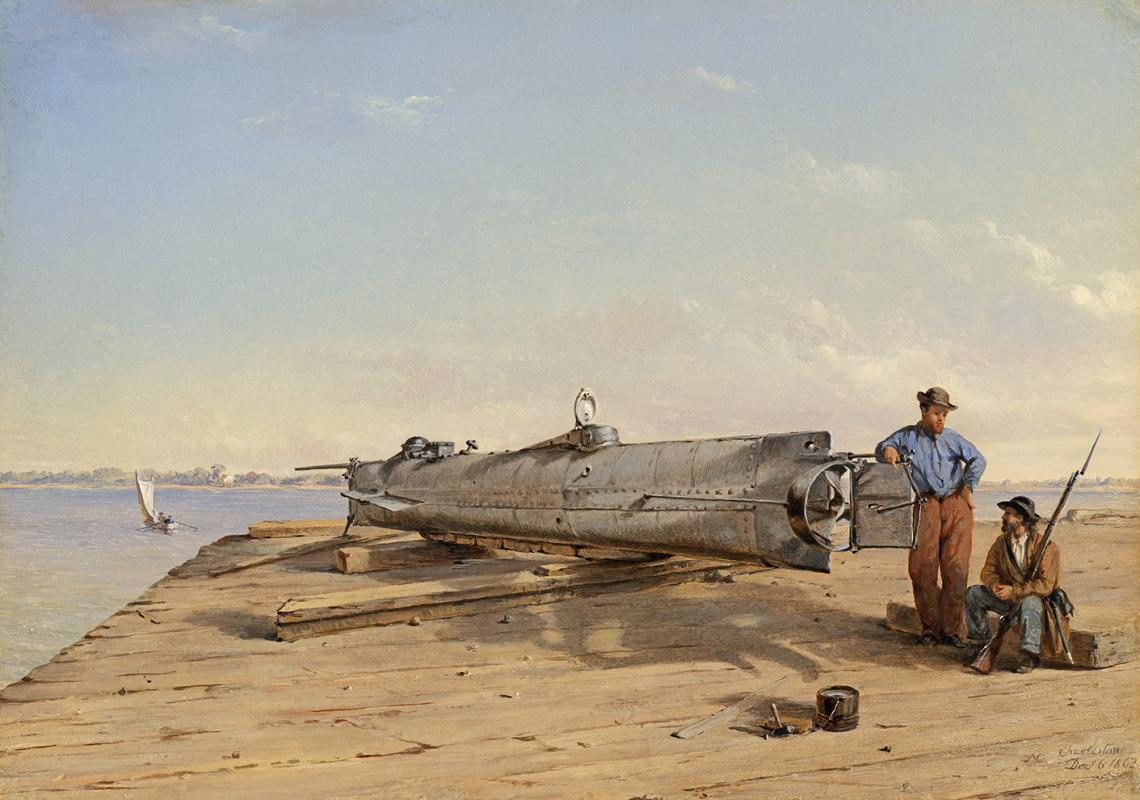
Confederate submarine H. L. Hunley, Dec 6, 1863

At Beauregard's request, his allies in the Confederate Congress petitioned Davis to restore his command in the West. Davis remained angry at Beauregard's absence and told him he should have stayed at his post even if he had to be carried around in a litter. He wrote, "If the whole world were to ask me to restore General Beauregard to the command which I have already given to General Bragg, I would refuse it." Beauregard was ordered to Charleston and took command of coastal defenses in South Carolina, Georgia, and Florida, replacing Maj. Gen. John C. Pemberton. The latter was promoted to lieutenant general and transferred to command the defenses of Vicksburg, Mississippi.

Beauregard was unhappy with his new assignment, believing that he deserved command of one of the great Confederate field armies. He performed successfully, however, preventing the capture of Charleston by Union naval and land attacks in 1863. On April 7, 1863, Rear Admiral Samuel Francis Du Pont, commander of the South Atlantic Blockading Squadron, led a union ironclad attack against Fort Sumter that was repulsed by highly accurate artillery fire from Beauregard's forces. In July through September 1863, union land forces under Brig. Gen. Quincy A. Gillmore launched a series of attacks on Fort Wagner on Morris Island and other fortifications at the mouth of the harbor, while Rear Adm. John A. Dahlgren attempted to destroy Fort Sumter. Because the latter operation failed, the successful seizure of Morris Island was not effective in threatening Charleston.

During this period, Beauregard promoted innovative naval defense strategies, such as early experimentation with submarines, naval mines (called "torpedoes" in the Civil War), and with a small vessel called a torpedo-ram. A swift boat fitted with a torpedo on a pole projecting from its bow under water, it could be used to surprise an enemy vessel and impale it underneath the water line. He was also busy devising strategies for other generals in the Confederacy. He proposed that some of the state governors meet with Union governors of the Western states (what are called the Midwest states today) for a peace conference. The Davis administration rejected the idea, but it caused considerable political maneuvering by Davis's enemies in the Congress. Beauregard also proposed a grand strategy—submitted anonymously through his political allies so that it was not tainted by his reputation—to reinforce the Western armies at the expense of Robert E. Lee's army in Virginia, destroy the Federal army in Tennessee, which would induce Ulysses S. Grant to relieve pressure on Vicksburg and maneuver his army into a place where it could be destroyed. The Confederate Army would continue to Ohio, and induce the Western states to ally with the Confederacy. Meanwhile, a fleet of torpedo-rams built in England could be used to recapture New Orleans, ending the war. There is no record that his plan was ever officially presented to the government.

While visiting his forces in Florida, which had just repelled a Union advance near Jacksonville, Beauregard received a telegram that his wife had died on March 2, 1864. Living in Union-occupied New Orleans, she had been seriously ill for two years. A Northern-leaning local newspaper printed an opinion that her husband's actions had exacerbated her condition. This so fanned negative popular opinion that 6,000 people attended her funeral. Union Maj. Gen. Nathaniel P. Banks provided a steamer to carry her body upriver for burial in her native parish. Beauregard wrote that he would like to rescue "her hallowed grave" at the head of an army.

=== Richmond ===
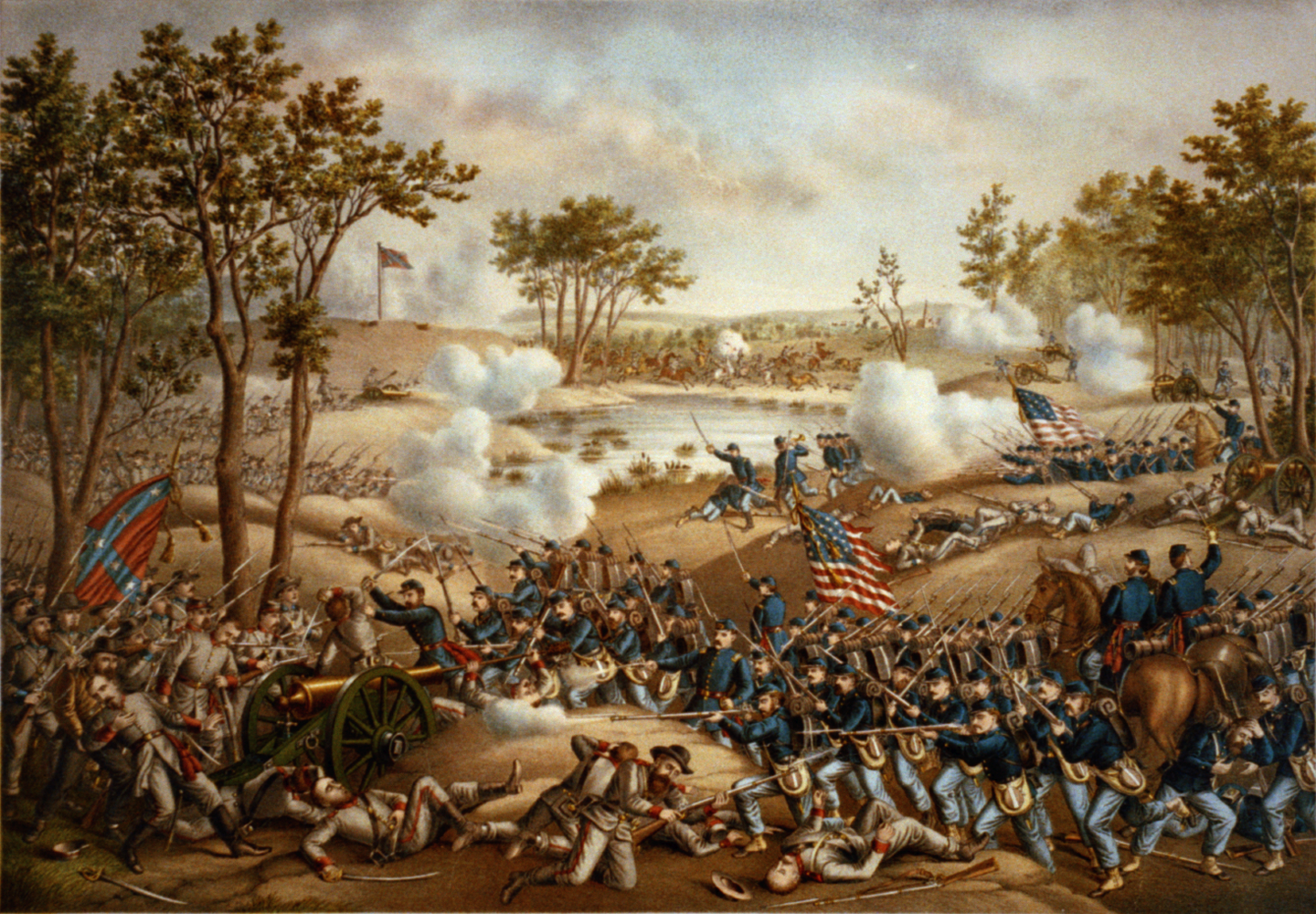
The Battle of Cold Harbor, May 31 – June 12, 1864

In April 1864, Beauregard saw little opportunity for military glory because he foresaw that there would be no more significant assaults against Charleston, and prospects for a major field command were unlikely. He requested a leave to recover from fatigue and a chronic throat ailment, but he instead received an order to report to Weldon, North Carolina, near the Virginia border, to play a key role in the defense of Virginia. His new assignment, the Department of North Carolina and Cape Fear, also included Virginia south of the James River. When he took command on April 18, he renamed it, on his own initiative, the Department of North Carolina and Southern Virginia. The Confederates were preparing for the spring offensive of Union Lt. Gen. Ulysses S. Grant and were concerned that attacks south of Richmond could interrupt the critical supply lines to Richmond and the army of Robert E. Lee.

Nothing illustrates better the fundamental weakness of the Confederate command system than the weary series of telegrams exchanged in May and early June between Davis, Bragg, Beauregard, and Lee. Beauregard evaded his responsibility for determining what help he could give Lee; Davis and Bragg shirked their responsibility to decide, when he refused. The strangest feature of the whole affair was that, in the face of Lee's repeated requests, nobody in the high command thought to order Beauregard to join Lee.

— T. Harry Williams, Napoleon in Gray

As Grant moved south against Lee in the Overland Campaign, Union Maj. Gen. Benjamin Butler launched the surprise Bermuda Hundred Campaign with landings up the James River. Beauregard successfully lobbied with Jefferson Davis's military adviser, Braxton Bragg, to prevent significant units of his small force from being transferred north of Richmond to the aid of Lee. His timely action, coupled with the military incompetence of Butler, bottled up the Union army, nullifying its threat to Petersburg and Lee's supply line. Now that this sector was stable, pressure began to rise to transfer troops from Beauregard's front to Lee's. Beauregard did send a division (Maj. Gen. Robert Hoke's) to Lee for the Battle of Cold Harbor, but Lee urgently wanted more and took the step of offering Beauregard command of the right wing of the Army of Northern Virginia for his cooperation. Beauregard replied in a passive–aggressive manner, "I am willing to do anything for our success, but cannot leave my Department without orders of War Department."

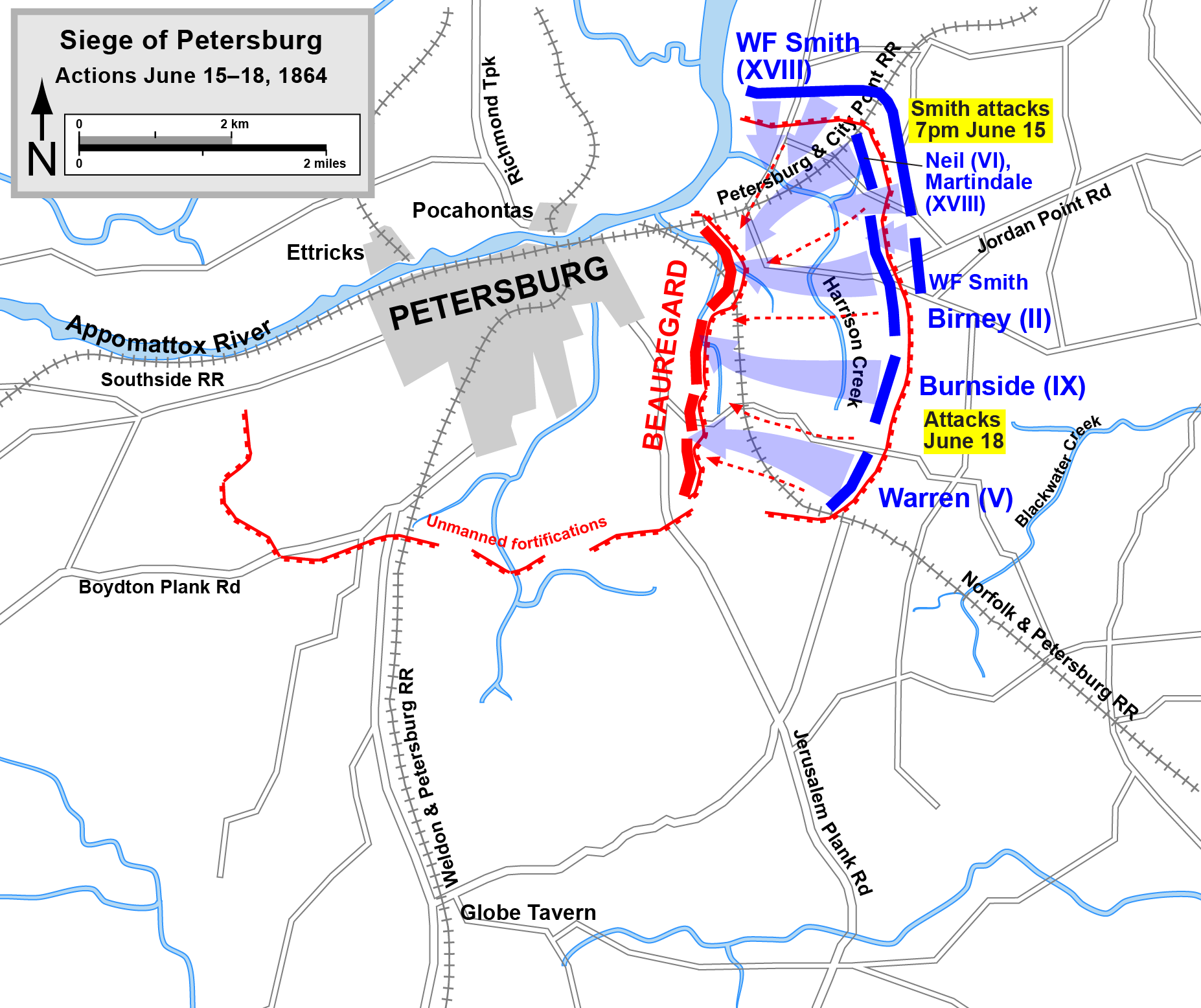
Beauregard's defense of Petersburg, Federal assaults of June 15–18

After Cold Harbor, Lee and the Confederate high command were unable to anticipate Grant's next move, but Beauregard's strategic sense allowed him to make a prophetic prediction: Grant crossed the James River and attempted to seize Petersburg, which was lightly defended, but contained critical rail junctions supporting Richmond and Lee. Despite persistent pleas to reinforce this sector, Beauregard could not convince his colleagues of the danger. On June 15, his weak 5,400-man force—including boys, old men, and patients from military hospitals—resisted an assault by 16,000 Federals, known as the Second Battle of Petersburg. He gambled by withdrawing his Bermuda Hundred defenses to reinforce the city, assuming correctly that Butler would not capitalize on the opening. His gamble succeeded, and he held Petersburg long enough for Lee's army to arrive. It was arguably his finest combat performance of the war.

Beauregard continued commanding the defenses of Petersburg in the early days of the siege, but with the loss of the Weldon Railroad in the Battle of Globe Tavern (August 18–21), he was criticized for not attacking more forcefully and he became dissatisfied with the command arrangements under Lee. He hoped for an independent command, but his desires were thwarted in two instances: Lee chose Lt. Gen. Jubal Early to lead an expedition north through the Shenandoah Valley and threaten Washington, and Davis chose Lt. Gen. John Bell Hood to replace the faltering Joseph E. Johnston in the Atlanta campaign.

=== Return to the West ===
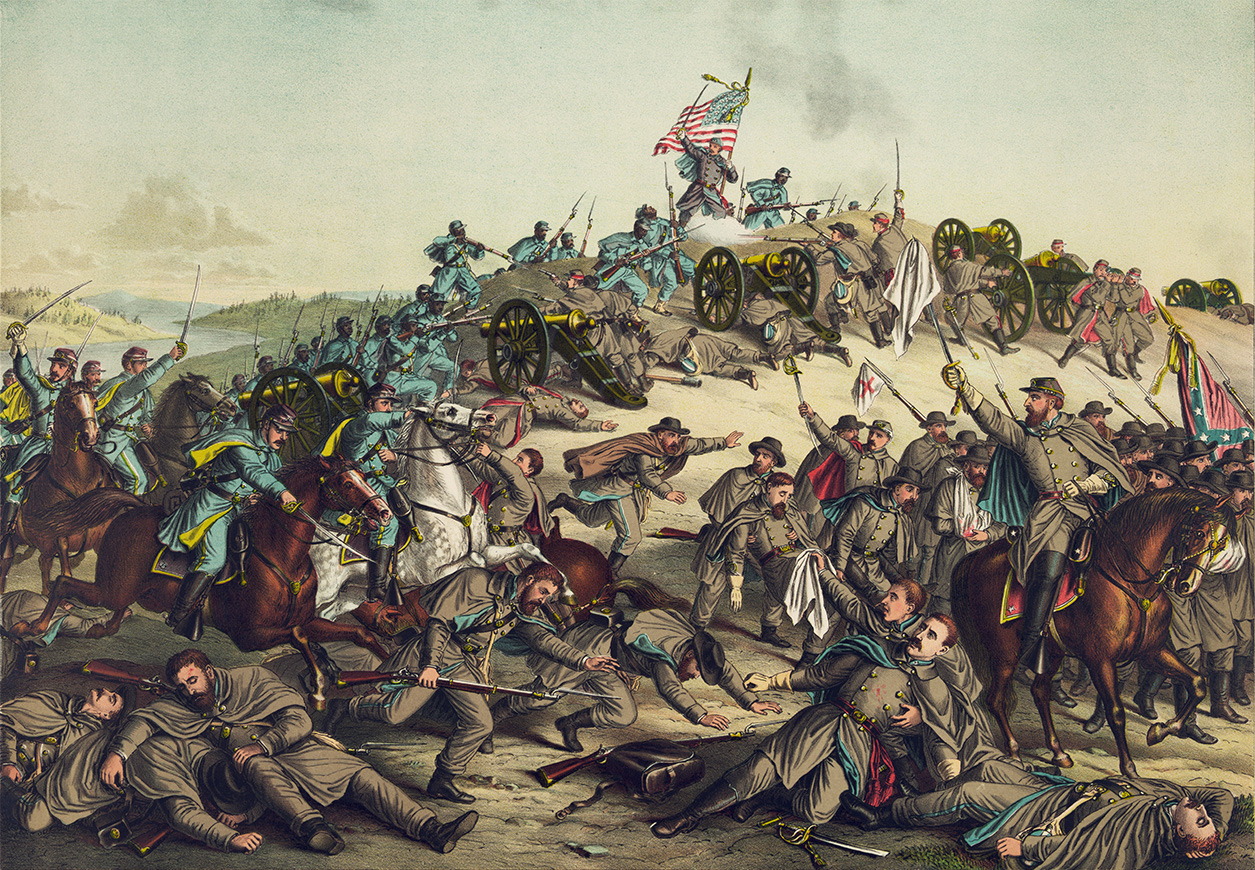
The Battle of Nashville, December 15–16, 1864

After the fall of Atlanta in September 1864, President Davis considered replacing John Bell Hood in command of the Army of Tennessee and he asked Robert E. Lee to find out if Beauregard would be interested. Beauregard was indeed interested, but it is unclear whether Davis seriously considered the appointment, and in the end decided to retain Hood. Davis met with Beauregard in Augusta, Georgia, on October 2 and offered him command of the newly created Department of the West, responsible for the five Southern states from Georgia to the Mississippi River, with the armies of Hood and Richard Taylor under his ostensible command. However, it was a thankless job that was limited to logistical and advisory responsibilities, without true operational control of the armies unless he should join them in person during an emergency. Nevertheless, anxious to return to the field, he accepted the assignment.

The major field operation of the fall was Hood's Franklin-Nashville Campaign, an invasion of Tennessee, which he undertook under Beauregard and Davis' orders. Beauregard always kept in touch with Hood, despite all the obstacles facing the latter general's way. The two later developed a friendship that lasted until Hood's death in 1879, after which Beauregard became chairman of the Hood Relief Committee; he arranged for the publication of Hood's memoirs, Advance and Retreat, in order to care for the orphaned Hood children.

While Hood traveled through Alabama and into Tennessee, Union Maj. Gen. William Tecumseh Sherman began his March to the Sea from Atlanta to Savannah, which focused Beauregard's attention back to Georgia. He was ineffective in stopping, or even delaying, Sherman's advance. He had inadequate local forces and was reluctant to strip defenses from other locations to concentrate them against Sherman. Furthermore, Sherman did an excellent job of deceiving the Confederates as to the intermediate and final targets of his march. Savannah fell on December 21, and Sherman's army began to march north into South Carolina in January. Also in late December, Beauregard found out that Hood's army had been severely weakened in its defeat at the Battle of Nashville; there were very few men in fighting condition who could oppose Sherman's advance.

Beauregard attempted to concentrate his small forces before Sherman could reach Columbia, South Carolina, the state capital. His urgent dispatches to Richmond were treated with disbelief—Davis and Robert E. Lee (now the general in chief of all the Confederate armies) could not believe that Sherman was advancing without a supply line as quickly as Beauregard was observing him do. Also concerned about what he considered Beauregard's "feeble health," Lee recommended to Davis that he be replaced by Joseph E. Johnston. The change of command came on February 22 and Beauregard, although outwardly cooperative and courteous to Johnston, was bitterly disappointed at his replacement. For the remainder of the war, Beauregard was Johnston's subordinate, assigned to routine matters without combat responsibilities. Johnston and Beauregard met with President Davis on April 13, and their assessment of the Confederate situation helped convince Davis that Johnston should meet with Sherman to negotiate a surrender of his army. The two surrendered to Sherman near Durham, North Carolina, on April 26, 1865, and were paroled in Greensboro on May 2. Beauregard traveled to Mobile and then took a U.S. naval transport to his hometown of New Orleans. In August that year, Beauregard's house was surrounded by troops who suspected he was harboring Edmund Kirby Smith. All the inhabitants were locked in a cotton press overnight. Beauregard complained to General Philip Sheridan who expressed his annoyance at his erstwhile enemy's treatment.

== Post-bellum career ==
=== Reconstruction ===
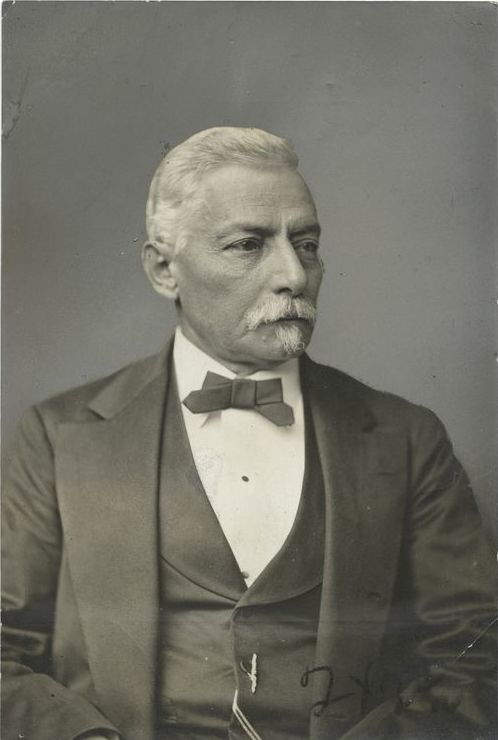
Beauregard, later in life

After the war, Beauregard was reluctant to seek amnesty as a former Confederate officer by publicly swearing an oath of loyalty, but both Lee and Johnston counseled him to do so, which he did before the mayor of New Orleans on September 16, 1865. He was one of many Confederate officers issued a mass pardon by President Andrew Johnson on July 4, 1868. His final privilege as an American citizen, the right to run for public office, was restored when he petitioned the Congress for relief and the bill on his behalf was signed by President Grant on July 24, 1876.

Beauregard pursued a position in the Brazilian Army in 1865, but declined the Brazilians' offer. He claimed that the positive attitude of President Johnson toward the South swayed his decision. "I prefer to live here, poor and forgotten, than to be endowed with honor and riches in a foreign country." He also declined offers to take command of the armies of Romania and Egypt.

In 1868, Beauregard was vacationing at White Sulphur Springs, West Virginia, where a number of other prominent former Confederates including Lee were. Former Union general William S. Rosecrans met with the former Confederates to have them prepare a statement that the former Confederacy could be counted on to accept the result of the war, which would be beneficial for Democratic Party hopes in the 1868 presidential election. Beauregard was a signer of the resulting document, which in the words of the historian T. Harry Williams, stated that "the South accepted the results of the war and emancipation and that it felt kindly toward" African Americans but opposed Blacks participating in the political process. Upon his return, Rosecrans gave an interview about the meeting in which he described Beauregard as weak in the presence of Lee, but on his own friendly towards African Americans having voting rights; Williams believes that the publication of this interview must have angered Beauregard.

Beauregard worked to end the harsh penalties levied on Louisiana by Radical Republicans during Reconstruction. His outrage over the perceived excesses of Reconstruction, such as heavy property taxation, was a principal source for his indecision about remaining in the United States and his flirtation with foreign armies, which lasted until 1875. His views on Reconstruction were influenced by his belief that the newly freed slaves could be politically controlled by Southern whites; Williams describes Beauregard's views of the former slaves at this time as "naturally inferior, ignorant, and indolent". Seeing the situation pragmatically, Beauregard advocated for Southern acceptance of the changed political situation, with the intent of getting the freed slaves to vote in ways aligned with postwar Southern economic interests. He was active in the Reform Party, which was focused on state issues instead of national issues, although for the 1872 presidential election, Beauregard wrote a public letter supporting Liberal Republican nominee Horace Greeley over Grant. The Reform Party, which was largely made up of Louisiana businessmen, did not have a specific policy regarding African Americans in the 1872 election, and received little support from that demographic. The following year, the party created the Louisiana Unification Movement. Beauregard was a leader at a meeting held by the movement in June 1873; this movement was attended by 100 prominent individuals, divided evenly between the races. The movement advocated for political equality between blacks and whites, and opposed segregation; its leaders believed that winning African American votes was necessary to end Radical Republican rule and the associated high taxes. The movement failed, and Beauregard withdrew from political involvement for the rest of Reconstruction.

Beauregard's first employment following the war was in October 1865 as chief engineer and general superintendent of the New Orleans, Jackson and Great Northern Railroad. In 1866 he was promoted to president, a position he retained until 1870, when he was ousted in a hostile takeover. This job overlapped with that of president of the New Orleans and Carrollton Street Railway (1866–1876), where he invented a system of cable-powered street railway cars. Once again, Beauregard made a financial success of the company, but was fired by stockholders who wished to take direct management of the company.

In 1869, he demonstrated a cable car and was issued U.S. patent 97,343.

=== Later life ===
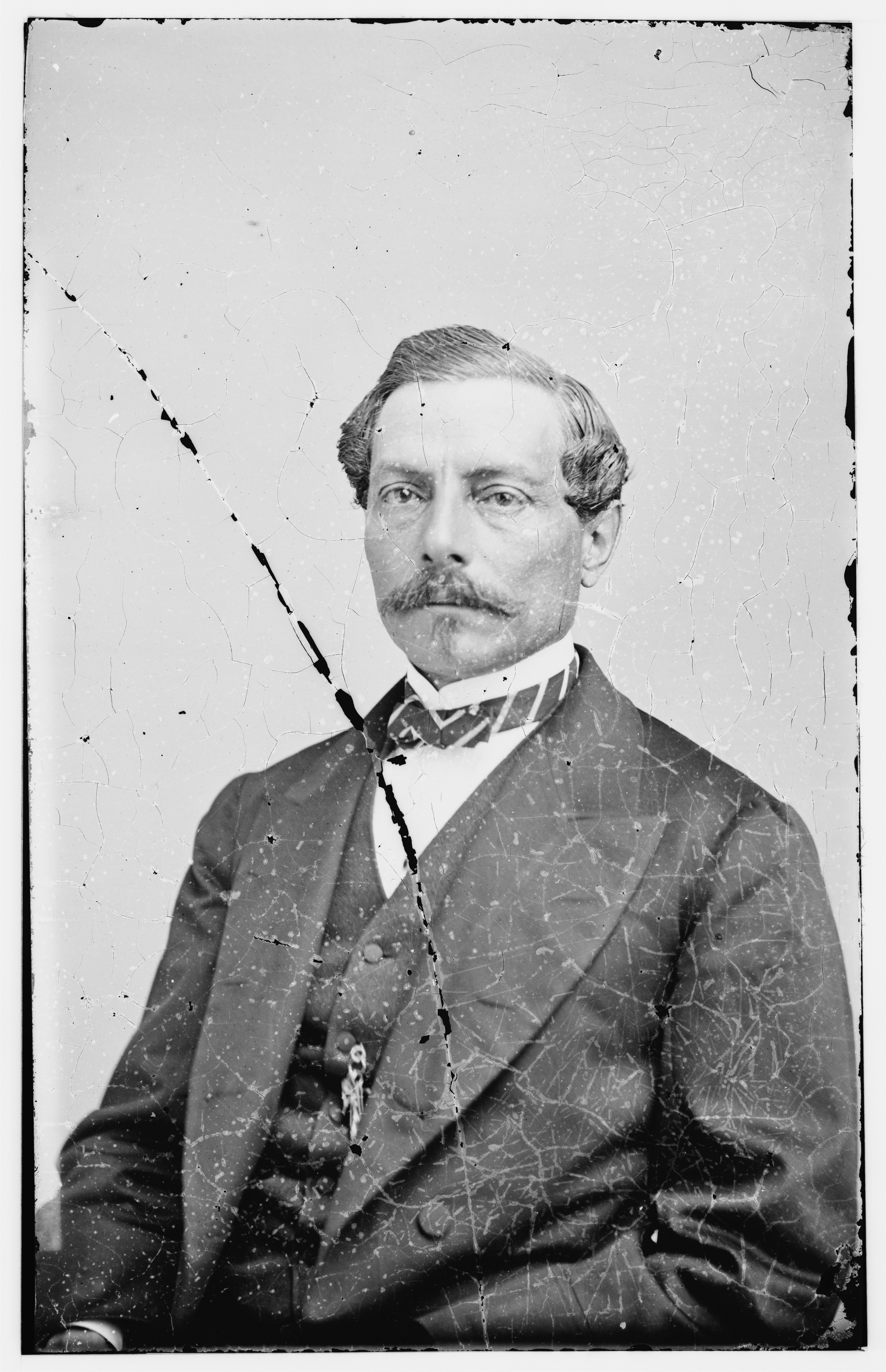
Beauregard in civilian dress

After the loss of these two railway executive positions, Beauregard spent time briefly at a variety of companies and civil engineering pursuits, but his personal wealth became assured when he was recruited as a supervisor of the Louisiana State Lottery Company in 1877. He and former Confederate general Jubal Early presided over lottery drawings and made numerous public appearances, lending the effort some respectability. For 15 years the two generals served in these positions, but the public became opposed to government-sponsored gambling and the lottery was closed down by the legislature.

Beauregard's military writings include Principles and Maxims of the Art of War (1863), Report on the Defense of Charleston, and A Commentary on the Campaign and Battle of Manassas (1891). He was the uncredited co-author of his friend Alfred Roman's The Military Operations of General Beauregard in the War Between the States (1884). He contributed the article "The Battle of Bull Run" to Century Illustrated Monthly Magazine in November 1884. During these years, Beauregard and Davis published a series of bitter accusations and counter-accusations retrospectively blaming each other for the Confederate defeat.

Beauregard served as adjutant general for the Louisiana state militia, 1879–88. During the late nineteenth century the Knights of Labor, an organization for labor advocacy and militancy, organized sugar worker wage strikes. Democratic newspapers began circulating false reports of black-on-white violence from the Knights of Labor, and several states called out militias to break the strikes. In 1887, Democratic Governor Samuel McEnery called for the assistance of ten infantry companies and an artillery company of the state militia. They were to protect black strikebreakers and suppress the wage strikers. A part of the militia arrived to suppress wage strikers in St. Mary Parish, resulting in the Thibodaux Massacre; the Attakapas Rangers led by Captain C. T. Cade joined a sheriff's posse facing down a group of sugar strikers. When one of the wage strikers reached into a pocket, posse members opened fire into the crowd, "as many as twenty people" killed or wounded on November 5 in the black village of Pattersonville.

Ultimately, the militia protected some 800 strikebreakers in Terrebone Parish, and captured and arrested 50 wage strikers, mostly for union activities. The Knights of Labor strike collapsed there, and sugar workers returned to the plantations.

In 1888, he was elected as commissioner of public works in New Orleans. When John Bell Hood and his wife died in 1879, leaving ten destitute orphans, Beauregard used his influence to get Hood's memoirs published, with all proceeds going to the children. He was appointed by the governor of Virginia to be the grand marshal of the festivities associated with the laying of the cornerstone of Robert E. Lee's statue in Richmond. But when Jefferson Davis died in 1889, Beauregard refused the honor of heading the funeral procession, saying "We have always been enemies. I cannot pretend I am sorry he is gone. I am no hypocrite."

Beauregard died in his sleep in New Orleans. The cause of death was recorded as "heart disease, aortic insufficiency, and probably myocarditis." Edmund Kirby Smith, the last surviving full general of the Confederacy, served as the "chief mourner" as Beauregard was interred in the vault of the Army of Tennessee in historic Metairie Cemetery.

In the post-war years, Beauregard's views on the Republican Party and Reconstruction had moderated significantly. T. Harry Williams (Beauregard's major biographer) saw Beauregard as having lived a paradoxical life. Unlike many ex-Confederates, he did not remain focused on the past of the Old South and the Confederacy, but looked forward to the economic progress of a changing South. Beauregard also expressed respect for President Lincoln in the postwar period. Following Beauregard's death in 1893, Victor E. Rillieux, a Creole of color and poet who wrote poems for many famous contemporary civil rights activists, including Ida B. Wells, was moved by Beauregard's passing to create a poem titled "Dernier Tribut" (English: "Last Tribute").

== Legacy ==
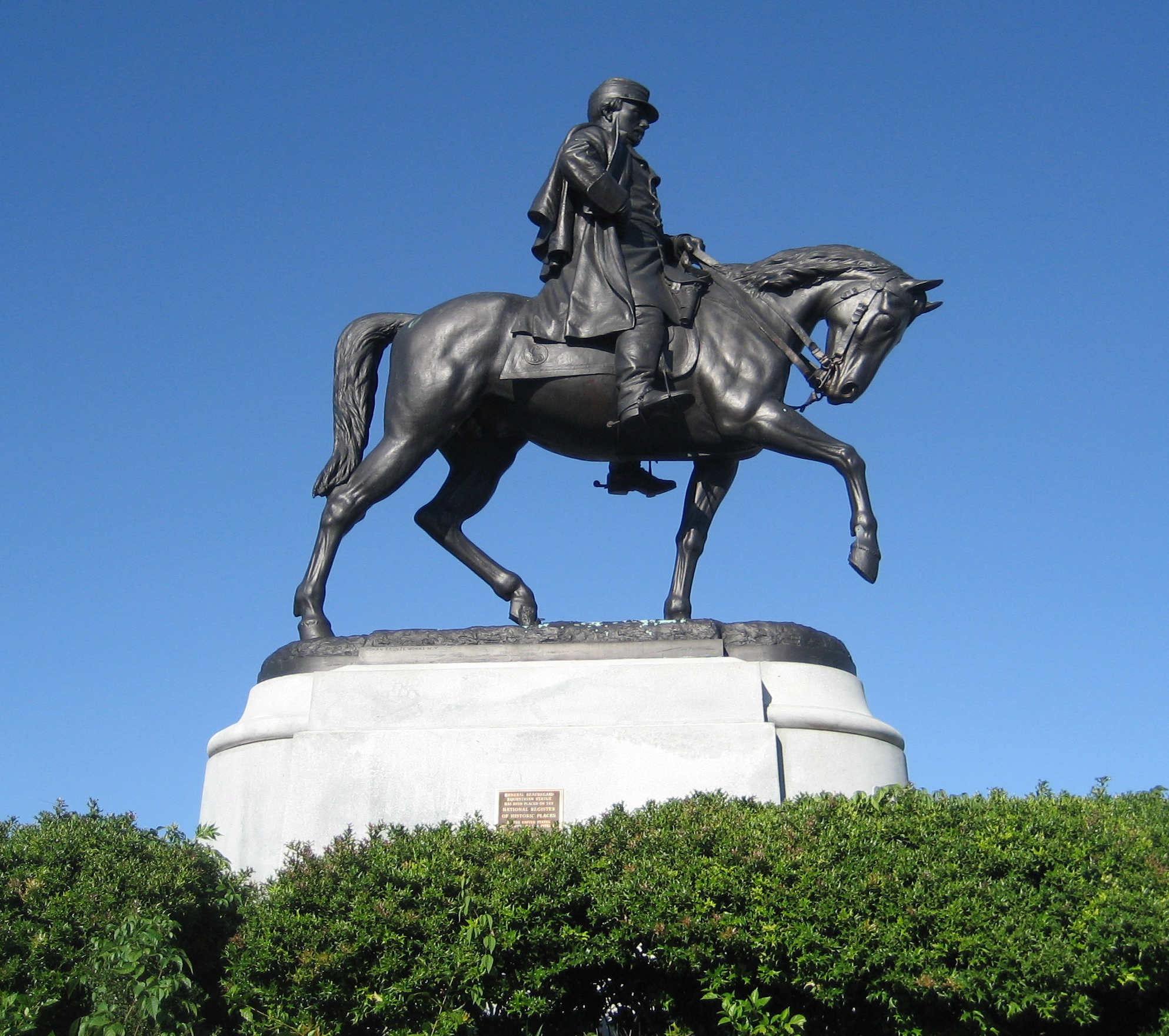
General P.G.T. Beauregard Equestrian Statue by sculptor Alexander Doyle was in New Orleans in 1915–2017.

Beauregard's residence at 1113 Chartres Street in New Orleans is now called the Beauregard-Keyes House, and is operated as a historic house museum. It was previously owned by American author Frances Parkinson Keyes, who wrote a fictional biography of Beauregard in which the house is an important setting.

Beauregard Parish in western Louisiana is named for him. As was Camp Beauregard, a former U.S. Army base and National Guard camp near Pineville in central Louisiana, until 2023, when it was renamed Louisiana National Guard Training Center Pineville. The unincorporated community of Beauregard, Alabama is also named for him, as is Beauregard, Mississippi. Four camps (local chapters) are named after Beauregard in the Sons of Confederate Veterans.

An equestrian monument by Alexander Doyle in New Orleans depicted him. The monument was removed on May 17, 2017.

Beauregard Hall was an Instructional Building at Nicholls State University. It was renamed as College of Sciences and Technology in 2020.

== Dates of rank ==
=== United States Army ===
Date	Insignia	Rank	Brevet Promotions
July 1, 1834		Cadet	
July 1, 1838		Second lieutenant	
June 16, 1839		First lieutenant	Bvt. Captain (1847) (Note: August 20, 1847, for gallantry and meritorious conduct in the battles of Contreras and Churubusco.); Bvt. Major (1847) (Note: September 13, 1847, for gallantry and meritorious conduct in the Battle of Chapultepec.)
March 3, 1853		Captain	
February 20, 1861	Resigned to enter into the services of the Confederate States Army.		

=== Confederate States Army ===
Date	Insignia	Rank	Brevet Promotions
March 1, 1861		Brigadier General	
July 21, 1861		General	
May 2, 1865	Resigned from the Confederate States Army upon his surrender and parole.		

== See also ==
- List of American Civil War generals (Confederate)
- Bibliography of the American Civil War
