= Multiple-effect evaporator =

Apparatus for efficiently boiling water by recycling waste heat from steam

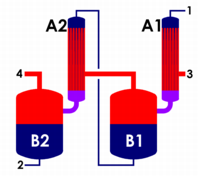
diagram of a double-effect falling film evaporator. Condensing vapors from flash tank B1 heat evaporator A2. •1=feed •2=product •3=steam •4=vapors

In chemical engineering, a multiple-effect evaporator is an apparatus for efficiently using the heat from steam to evaporate water. Water is boiled in a sequence of vessels, each held at a lower pressure than the last. Because the boiling temperature of water decreases as pressure decreases, the vapor boiled off in one vessel can be used to heat the next, and only the first vessel (at the highest pressure) requires an external source of heat. The multiple-effect evaporator was invented by the American (Louisiana Creole) engineer Norbert Rillieux. Although he may have designed the apparatus during the 1820s and constructed a prototype in 1834, he did not build the first industrially practical evaporator until 1845. Originally designed for concentrating sugar in sugar cane juice, it has since become widely used in all industrial applications where large volumes of water must be evaporated, such as salt production and water desalination.

Multiple-effect evaporation commonly uses sensible heat in the condensate to preheat liquor to be flashed. In practice the design liquid flow paths can be somewhat complicated in order to extract the most recoverable heat and to obtain the highest evaporation rates from the equipment. While in theory, evaporators may be built with an arbitrarily large number of stages, evaporators with more than four stages are rarely practical except in certain applications. Multiple-effect evaporation plants in sugar beet factories have up to eight effects; sextuple-effect evaporators are common in the recovery of black liquor in the kraft process for making wood pulp.

Entrainment of the product in the solvent causes a number of issues including firstly decrease in the amount of product recovered, secondly potential damage or fouling of the evaporation lines and steam chest of the next stage, and thirdly problems dealing or disposing of the solvent.

== Types ==
=== Forward feed ===
In forward feed the condensate and the feed-concentrate move in the same direction. In this case the vacuum pressure can be sufficient to pull the feed through the system.

=== Backward feed ===
Here the concentrate flows in the opposite direction to the condensate. Pumps are required between stages, however the design has less heating costs.

=== Parallel feed ===
In the simplest version of this design the feed goes to each stage.

== See also ==
- Marine use of compound evaporators
- Multi-stage flash distillation
- Multi-effect distillation
