= Norbert Rillieux =

American inventor, engineer (1806–1894)

- Born: March 17, 1806; New Orleans, Territory of Orleans
- Died: October 8, 1894 (aged 88); Paris, France
- Education: École Centrale Paris
- Occupation: Engineer
- Spouse: Emily Cuckow

Norbert Rillieux (March 17, 1806 – October 8, 1894) was a Louisiana Creole inventor who was widely considered one of the earliest chemical engineers and noted for his pioneering invention of the multiple-effect evaporator. This invention was an important development in the growth of the sugar industry. Rillieux, a French-speaking Creole, was a cousin of the painter Edgar Degas.

== Family ==
Norbert Rillieux was born into a prominent Creole family in New Orleans, Louisiana. He was the son of Vincent Rillieux, a white plantation owner and inventor, and his placée, Constance Vivant, a free person of color. Norbert was the eldest of seven children. His siblings were: Barthelemy, Edmond, Marie Eugenie, Louis, Marie Eloise, and Cecile Virginie. Norbert's aunt on his father's side, Marie Celeste Rillieux, was the grandmother of painter Edgar Degas. His aunt on his mother's side, Eulalie Vivant, was the mother of Bernard Soulie, one of the wealthiest gens de couleur libre in Louisiana. One of Norbert's cousins was the blind writer Victor Ernest Rillieux.

== Early life ==
As a Creole of color, Norbert Rillieux had access to education and privileges not available to lower-status free blacks or slaves. Baptized Catholic, Rillieux received his early education at private Catholic schools in Louisiana before traveling to Paris in the early 1820s to study at École Centrale Paris, one of the top engineering schools in France. While at École Centrale, Norbert studied physics, mechanics, and engineering. He became an expert in steam engines and published several papers about the use of steam to work devices. These early explorations became the foundation of the technology he would later implement in his evaporator. At 24 (1830), Rillieux became the youngest teacher at École Centrale, instructing in applied mechanics.

== Sugar refining ==
In the 1800s, the process for sugar refinement was slow, expensive, and inefficient. The most common method of converting sugarcane into sugar was called the "Sugar Train"; it was also known as the "Spanish Train" or "Jamaica Train". The sugarcane juice was pressed from the cane and poured into a large kettle, where it was heated and left until most of the water evaporated. The workers, who were mostly slaves, poured the resultant thick liquid into smaller and smaller pots as the liquid continued to thicken. Each time the liquid was poured, some of the sugar was lost. A considerable amount of sugar was also burned because it was difficult to monitor and maintain appropriate heat levels for the pots. The process was also dangerous for the workers, who had to routinely transfer the hot liquid.

While in France, Norbert Rillieux started researching ways to improve the process of sugar refining. Meanwhile, back in Louisiana, Norbert's brother, Edmond, a builder, along with their cousin, Norbert Soulie, an architect, began working with Edmund Forstall to build a new Louisiana Sugar Refinery. In 1833, Forstall, having heard about Rillieux's research into sugar refining, offered him the position of Head Engineer at the not-yet-completed sugar refinery. Rillieux accepted the offer and returned to Louisiana to take up his new position. However, the sugar refinery was never completed due to disagreements between the principals, mainly Edmond Rillieux, his father, Vincent Rillieux, and Edmund Forstall. These disagreements created long-term resentments between the Rillieux family and Edmund Forstall.

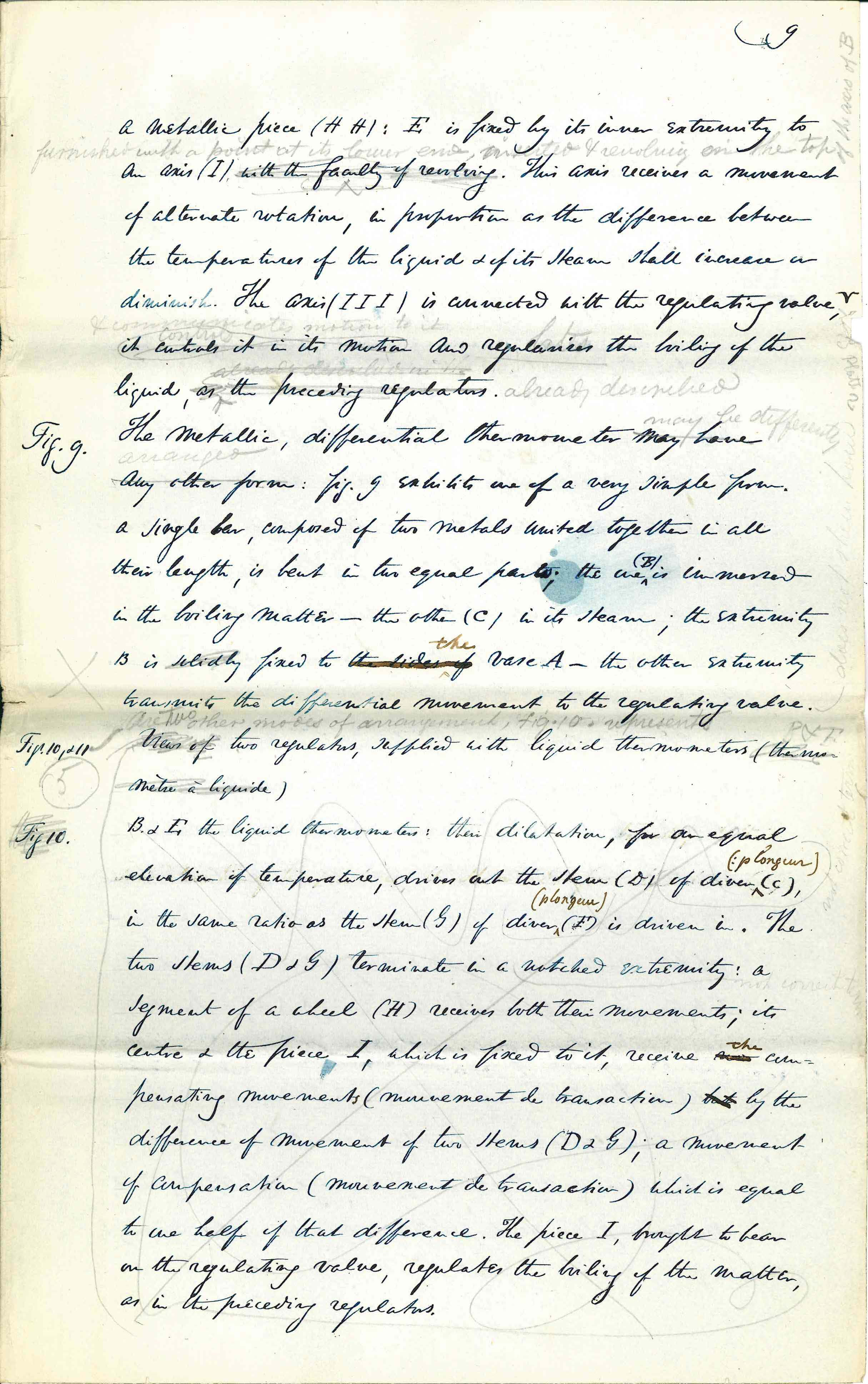
Image from patent case file.

In spite of the failure of the collaboration, Norbert Rillieux remained focused on improving the sugar refining process, developing his machine between 1834 and 1843, when he patented it. The multiple-effect evaporation system that he invented addressed both the spillage that resulted from transfer and the uneven application of heat, as well as making the process safer for workers. The system utilizes a vacuum chamber or a container with reduced air to lower the boiling point of the liquids. Inside this several pans are stacked to contain the sugarcane juice. As the bottom pans heat, they release steam to transfer heat to the pans above. The heat is more easily controlled than in the Jamaican Train method because one source is needed, at a lower temperature, for multiple pans of sugarcane juice. This prevents the sugar from being burned and discolored. As the workers do not have to transfer the liquid, sugarcane is not spilled, and they are at a reduced risk for burns.

Norbert Rillieux's invention revolutionized sugar processing. His great scientific achievement was his recognition that at reduced pressure the repeated use of latent heat would result in the production of better quality sugar at a lower cost. One of the great early innovations in chemical engineering, Rillieux's invention is widely recognized as the best method for lowering the temperature of all industrial evaporation and for saving large quantities of fuel.

Several years after patenting the system, Norbert Rillieux successfully installed it at Theodore Packwood's Myrtle Grove plantation. Not long after this, Rillieux's new system was installed at Bellechasse, a plantation owned by Packwood's business partner, Judah P. Benjamin. Benjamin and Rillieux became quite good friends, possibly due to their similar social situation; they were both considered outsiders in Louisiana's very class-conscious society.

After these successes, Norbert Rillieux managed to convince 13 Louisiana sugar factories to use his invention. By 1849, Merrick & Towne in Philadelphia were offering sugar makers a choice of three different multiple-effect evaporation systems. They were able to select machines capable of making 6000, 12000, or 18000 pounds of sugar per day. The evaporators were so efficient that the sugar makers were able to cover the costs of the new machine with the huge profits from the sugar produced with Norbert Rillieux's system.

== Other work ==
Rillieux also used his engineering skills to deal with a yellow fever outbreak in New Orleans in the 1850s. Rillieux presented a plan to the city that would eliminate the moist breeding grounds for the mosquitoes that carried the disease by addressing problems in the city's sewer system and drying swamplands in the area. The plan was blocked by Edmund Forstall, now a state legislator. Several years later, the ongoing yellow fever outbreak in New Orleans was addressed by engineers using a method extremely similar to Rillieux's proposals.

== Later life ==
Norbert Rillieux returned to France in the late 1850s, a few years before the start of the American Civil War. Race relations in the United States may have motivated part of his decision to do so since at one point, Rillieux became enraged when one of his applications for a patent was rejected because authorities falsely believed that he was a slave and thus, not a citizen in the United States.

In Paris, Rillieux became interested in Egyptology and hieroglyphics, which he studied with the family of Jean-François Champollion. He spent the next decade working at the Bibliothèque Nationale.

In 1881, at the age of 75, Rillieux made one last foray into sugar evaporation when he adapted his multiple effect evaporation system to extract sugar from sugar beets. The process for which he filed patent was far more fuel-efficient than that currently in use in the beet sugar factories in France. Prior to Rillieux's invention, two engineers developed a vacuum pan and electric coils to improve the process of making sugar, but this was unsuccessful due to the use of steam at wrong locations in the machine. Rillieux's process fixed the errors in the previous process, but Rillieux lost the rights to the patent he had filed.

Norbert Rillieux died on October 8, 1894, aged 88. He is buried in Père Lachaise Cemetery in Paris with the inscription "Ici reposent Norbert Rellieux ingénieur civil né à la Nouvelle Orleans 18 Mars 1806/décédé à Paris le 8 Octobre 1894/Emily Cuckow, Veuve Rillieux 1827-1912." His wife, Emily Cuckow, died in 1912 and is buried beside him.

In his honor, a bronze memorial was erected in the Louisiana State Museum with the inscription: "To honor Norbert Rillieux, born at New Orleans, Louisiana, March 17, 1806, and died at Paris, France, October 8, 1894. Inventor of Multiple Evaporation and Its Application to the Sugar Industry."

== Sources ==
- The University of Michigan. (1993). Brodie, James M., Created Equal: The Lives and Ideas of Black American Innovators (pp. 42–44)
- MIT Press. (2005). Pursell, Carl W., A Hammer in Their Hands: A Documentary History of Technology and the African-American Experience (pp. 59–70)
- University of California (1999). Benfrey, Christopher, Degas in New Orleans: Encounters in the Creole World of Kate Chopin and George Washington Cable
