= Bureau of Foreign Supplies =

Agency of the Cofederate States War Department

Agency overview
- Formed: 1864
- Dissolved: 1865
- Headquarters: Richmond, Virginia
- Agency executive: Lt. Col. Thomas L. Bayne, Chief
- Parent agency: Confederate States War Department

The Bureau of Foreign Supplies was the agency of the Confederate States War Department created by an Act of Congress in 1864 that was responsible for purchasing and exporting cotton and other produce for the Confederacy in order to fund the war effort during the final year of the American Civil War.

Headed by Lieutenant Colonel Thomas L. Bayne of Georgia, the Bureau was created primarily in response to the widespread corruption of the Texas Cotton Bureau, which was managed by General Edmund Kirby Smith. Smith was intent on impressing cotton produced in Texas for the Confederate Army, which ran contrary to the purpose of the new agency.

The Bureau's involvement with and restrictions on the Texan cotton trade was heavily opposed by the Texas Legislature and Governor Murrah, who viewed the Bureau's activities as detrimental to legitimate business activity. The Texas Legislature almost unanimously opposed Confederate export duties on cotton, and accused officials in Richmond of undermining the war effort.

The Bureau of Foreign Supplies was dissolved along with all other agencies of the War Department in the Conclusion of the American Civil War.
