= Abraham Myers =

United States and Confederate States Army officer (1811–1889)

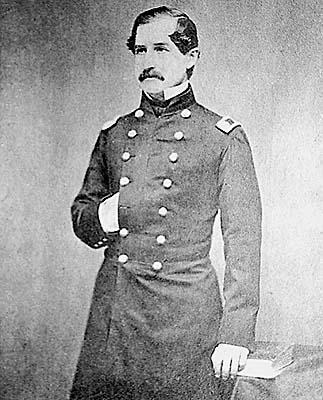
- Undated photo of Myers in uniform
- Born: Abraham Charles Myers; 14 May 1811; Georgetown, South Carolina; United States
- Died: June 1889 (aged 78); Washington, D.C., US
- Burial place: St. Paul's Cemetery; Alexandria, Virginia, US; 38.79955°N 77.05698°W
- Education: US Military Academy (1833)
- Occupation: Soldier
- Spouse: Marion Twiggs
- Children: John Twiggs Myers
- Confederate military career
- Allegiance: Confederate States
- Branch: Confederate States Army
- Years: 1861–1863/1864
- Rank: Colonel
- Unit: Quartermaster-General
- Conflicts: American Civil War
- US military career
- Allegiance: United States
- Branch: United States Army
- Years: 1833–1861 (27.6 years)
- Rank: Lieutenant colonel / Colonel
- Units: 4th Infantry Regiment; Quartermaster Department
- Conflicts: Second Seminole War; Mexican–American War; Battle of Palo Alto; Resaca de la Palma; Battle of Churubusco

Abraham Myers (also Abram Myers; 14 May 1811 – 20 or 28 June 1889) was a military officer in the United States and Confederate States Armies.

== Personal life ==
Abraham Charles Myers (also Abram) was born in Georgetown, South Carolina, on 14 May 1811. Myers was born into a Jewish family; his great-grandfather had been the first rabbi of Congregation K.K. Beth Elohim in Charleston, South Carolina. Myers was accepted to the United States Military Academy on 1 July 1828; after repeating his freshman year, he graduated on 1 July 1833. In February 1850, Major General David E. Twiggs named Fort Myers for his future son-in-law; Myers married Marion Twiggs before 1861.

== US military career ==
After accepting the rank of brevetted second lieutenant in the United States Army on 1 July 1833, Myers was stationed in Baton Rouge, Louisiana with the 4th Infantry Regiment. He received a promotion to full second lieutenant on 31 December 1835 before serving in the Second Seminole War.

Myers served in Florida from 1836–1838, fighting at Camp Izard and Oloklikaha, and receiving his promotion to first lieutenant on 6 September 1837. From 1838–1840, Myers worked in the recruiting service; with a promotion to staff captain on 21 November 1839, he transferred to the Quartermaster Department in St. Augustine, Florida. Myers returned to fighting in the Second Seminole War from 1841–1842.

Captain Myers was stationed at Fort Moultrie from 1842–1845. During the Mexican–American War, Myers served under Zachary Taylor at the Battle of Palo Alto and the Battle of Resaca de la Palma; his "gallant and meritorious conduct" thereat earned him a promotion to brevetted major. After his transfer to Winfield Scott's command, Myers fought at the Battle of Churubusco (receiving a brevetted promotion to colonel or lieutenant colonel for "gallant conduct"), and was the Army of Mexico's chief quartermaster from April–June 1848.

Assignments	Dates
Charleston, South Carolina; Savannah, Georgia	1848–1849
Department of Florida	1849–1851
New Orleans, Louisiana	1851–1854
Department of Texas	1854–1857
New York City	1857–1858
New Orleans, Louisiana	1858–1861

From 1848 to 1861, Myers served the Quartermaster Department at various posts, mostly in the Southern United States. While stationed in New Orleans on 28 Jan 1861, at the behest of Louisiana state officials, Myers "surrendered the quartermaster and commissary stores in his possession" before immediately resigning from the US Army.

South Carolina, the State where I was born, and Louisiana, the State of my adoption, having in convention passed ordinances of secession from the United States, I am absolved from my allegiance to the Federal government.

== Confederate military career ==
On 16 Mar 1861, Myers was appointed a lieutenant-colonel in the Confederate Quartermaster-General's Department. He was made the Confederacy's first acting quartermaster-general on 25 March 1861; the role was made official that December, with a promotion to colonel on 15 Feb 1862. After the Confederate capital moved from Montgomery, Alabama, to Richmond, Virginia, Myers' offices were made on the second floor of the building at the southwest corner of 9th and Main Street; his staff would eventually swell to 88 clerks—the largest office in the Confederacy's supply bureau. As president of the military board, Myers helped design the first Confederate Army uniform: "a blue flannel shirt, gray flannel pants, a red flannel undershirt, cotton drawers, wool socks, boots, and a cap."

As quartermaster-general, Myers was hampered by insufficient funds, the failure of the Confederate States dollar, and the poor railroads in the South; the Confederate States Army was never adequately supplied by Myers, especially with regard to clothing and shoes. By the 1930s, it was determined that while Myers had been very skilled at accountancy, he could not think outside his US training and experience, nor could he rise above "the laxity, carelessness, and inefficiency of remote subordinates".

=== End of service ===
Myers was ousted as quartermaster-general around the turn of 1864.

The 1934 Dictionary of American Biography says that Confederate President Jefferson Davis appointed Brigadier General Alexander Lawton as Myers' replacement on 7 August 1863 "in the interest of efficiency", but that the Confederate States Senate rejected the appointment on procedural grounds. Davis resubmitted Lawton to the Confederate Congress, and that body confirmed the general on 17 February 1864. When Myers refused to serve under Lawton, he "found himself, on a technicality, 'out of the army'".

A 1938 history of The Boston Club reported that Myers, one of the club's members, was forced out of the service in August 1863.

In 2000, Robert N. Rosen's The Jewish Confederates said that while there had been complaints about Myers from War Secretary James Seddon and General Robert E. Lee, President Davis had used the letter of the law to appoint his friend—Lawton—in retaliation for Myers' wife having called Varina Davis a "squaw". (Though as a Jew, Myers had seen some antisemitism in the Confederate ranks, Rosen explicitly argued that it had no bearing on Davis' actions.) Despite the efforts of the congress, Richmond society, and the Fourth Estate, Lawton was confirmed in February 1864. Rosen goes on to say that Myers refused to serve under Lawton, and though the Confederate States Attorney General opined that Myers was not in the army any longer, he himself maintained that "he was a colonel and a commissioned officer and remained on the army list".

Bruce Allardice's 2008 book Confederate Colonels concurs with much of the Rosen's analysis, though merely says that Myers resigned on 10 August 1863.

== Post-military ==
In 1864 and 1865, Myers lived in the state of Georgia, "almost in want, on the charity of friends". The Dictionary of American Biography believes he traveled through Europe from 1866–1877. The United States Marine Corps History Division reported that Myers' son, John Twiggs Myers, was born in the Imperial German city of Wiesbaden on 29 January 1871, and that the family returned to the US in 1876.

Myers' original gravestone, photographed in September 2023

Myers died in Washington, D.C., on 20 or 28 June 1889. He was buried at St. Paul's Cemetery in Alexandria, Virginia, under a headstone that read "Gen. A. C. Myers".
