= Victor E. Rillieux =

American poet

- Born: Victor Ernest Rillieux c. 1842; New Orleans, Louisiana, U.S.
- Died: May 12, 1898 (aged 55–56)
- Occupations: Songwriter, Poet, Playwright, Businessman
- Known for: Various works

Victor Earnest Rillieux (c. 1842 – 1898) was an American Creole of color songwriter, poet, playwright and businessman.

== Career ==
He was blind and was known for having written more than any other contemporary Louisianan, although few of his works remain. He wrote many poems about contemporary civil rights activists, including Ida B. Wells and the ex-Confederate Black civil rights advocate P. G. T. Beauregard.

== Life and family ==
Rillieux was born in New Orleans, Louisiana to a distinguished Creole family that provided many services to its community. One of his cousins was Norbert Rillieux, an inventor who created sugar refining equipment. Rillieux died on December 5, 1898.
