= Confederate Quartermaster-General's Department =

Military branch charged with general supplies

The Confederate Congress created the position of Quartermaster-General on 26 February 1861 and the Secretary of War was allowed one Colonel and six Majors to serve as Quartermasters. The first Quartermaster General was Col. Abraham C. Myers; his appointment would appear to have been a foregone conclusion as he was signing himself as Acting Quartermaster General on 2 January 1861. In May 1861 when the Confederate government moved to Richmond, Virginia, the headquarters of the Quartermaster General were located on the corner of Ninth and Main Street.

Quartermaster depots were created at Richmond, Virginia; Staunton, Virginia; Raleigh, North Carolina; Atlanta, Georgia; Columbus, Georgia; Huntsville, Alabama; Montgomery, Alabama; Jackson, Mississippi; Little Rock, Arkansas; Alexandria, Louisiana; and San Antonio, Texas.

In 1863 Myers resigned from his position as Quartermaster General and in August Jefferson Davis appointed the successor to serve in that capacity for the rest of the war; Brig. Gen. Alexander Lawton. Confederate railroads in the American Civil War were in the Department's purview.

== Quartermasters-General ==
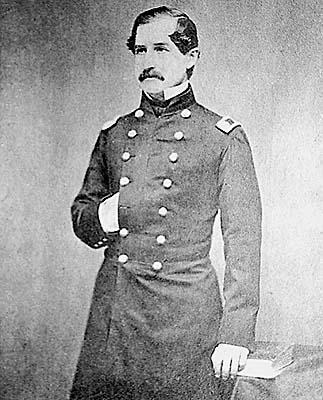
Abraham Myers

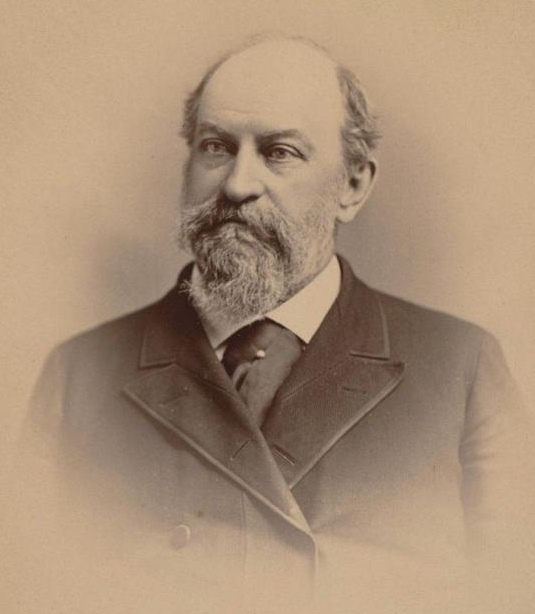
Alexander Lawton
