= Lucius B. Northrop =

American Confederate Commissary-General

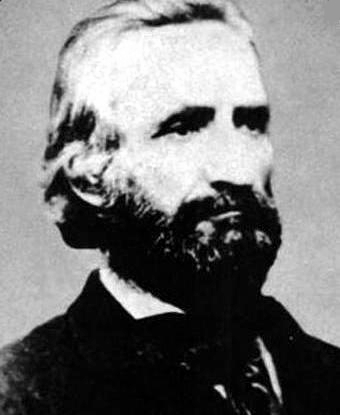
- Born: September 8, 1811; Charleston, South Carolina
- Died: February 9, 1894 (aged 82); Pikesville, Maryland
- Burial place: New Cathedral Catholic Cemetery, Baltimore, Maryland
- Military career
- Allegiance: United States Army; Confederate States Army
- Service years: 1831–1861 (USA); 1861–1865 (CSA)
- Rank: Captain (USA); Colonel (CSA)
- Units: 7th U.S. Infantry; 1st U.S. Dragoons
- Commands: Confederate Commissary Department
- Conflicts: 2nd Seminole War; American Civil War

Lucius Bellinger Northrop (September 8, 1811 – February 9, 1894), was the Commissary-General of the armed forces of the Confederate States of America. Appointed by Confederate president Jefferson Davis, a personal friend, Northrop was responsible for the logistics and supply chain that transported food, clothing, and forage to the Southern armies of the American Civil War, particularly the Army of Northern Virginia. Northrop was also responsible for supplying the prison camps that housed Federal prisoners-of-war, such as Andersonville.

== Early life and career ==
Northrop was born in Charleston, South Carolina. He was appointed to the United States Military Academy in West Point, Class of 1831. His time there overlapped with a fellow Southerner, Jefferson Davis (Class of 1828). After graduating, Northrop was commissioned as a second lieutenant of dragoons and assigned to a series of posts, including duty in Florida Territory during the Second Seminole War. While on duty in the Indian Territory in October 1839, Northrop suffered a severe wound to his right knee as the result of the discharge of his own pistol. With the exception of a few months of service in the army's subsistence department (from October 1842 to May 1843), he spent the following 8 years on sick leave. With permission from the War Department, he studied at Jefferson Medical College in Philadelphia.

The connection between Northrop and Davis was significant for Northrop's career. Permanently disabled, Northrop could no longer perform field duties for the United States Army. In January 1848, he was dropped from the army rolls, retiring to civilian life in Charleston and Anne Arundel County, Maryland. However, when Davis was appointed Secretary of War in 1853, the new Cabinet secretary took steps to recall his friend to the Army. The limping Northrop was promoted to the rank of captain.

== Civil War service ==
As a Southerner and friend of Davis, Northrop resigned his United States commission in January 1861 to join the secessionist colors. After Davis's election as Confederate president, the new commander-in-chief promoted Northrop to the rank of colonel; in March 1861, the Confederate War Department appointed him to the post of Commissary-General. In this office, Northrop was responsible for logistical services, including the transport of military necessities (other than arms and ammunition) to the Confederate armies, the movement of Confederate units from point to point along the battlefront, and the supply of necessities to members of the Union Army confined to Southern prisoner-of-war camps. Northrop served in this role from March 1861 until February 1865, when he was removed from office.

As the Confederate Commissary-General, Northrop faced almost insurmountable logistical problems. The Southern economy was not organized for total war and did not possess the infrastructure required to generate large quantities of food, shoes, and clothing, nor to transport them for long distances. The Confederacy lacked machinery to maintain its existing railroad network, or to build new locomotives and railroad cars to replace the equipment that was wearing out. In addition, severe inflation wracked the value of the Confederate currency that Northrop's men were authorized to offer to farms, shops, and small factories for goods desperately needed by the armies.

Even when allowance is granted for factors beyond Colonel Northrop's control, however, his performance in supplying food, shoes, clothing, and other necessities to the armies of the Confederacy was judged inexcusably inadequate by historians such as Bell I. Wiley. On numerous occasions, Confederate soldiers were forced to make do with scanty or inadequate rations, or to forage amongst their own countrymen for the necessities of life.

As the war continued, Confederate soldiers began, in letters home and to their congressmen, to express concerns about the performance of the office of the Commissary-General. Loyal to his friend, and aware of the overall logistical dilemmas facing the Confederacy, President Davis refrained from making Northrop into a scapegoat. However, logistical problems worsened and reached a crescendo in the supply situation facing the Army of Northern Virginia during the Siege of Petersburg in the winter of 1864–1865. Although Robert E. Lee's army had by this time become absolutely vital to the continued existence of the Confederacy, only two railroad lines (the Richmond & Danville and the Southside Railroad) linked the hungry soldiers with the fertile fields of Southside Virginia, and Northrop's commissary corps was pathetically unable to feed Lee's army.

Davis appointed Northrop a brigadier general on November 26, 1864, but he did not risk sending the appointment to the Confederate Senate, where it would surely have been rejected.

Opponents of Northrop, including members of the Confederate House and Senate who believed that the Northrop supply situation had become a deadly threat to the prospect for eventual Confederate victory, eventually introduced and adopted extraordinary legislative measures to impeach the Commissary-General or remove him from office. When Davis sought to appoint Maj. Gen. John C. Breckinridge as the Confederate Secretary of War, Breckinridge demanded as a condition of his acceptance that Northrop be removed. General Robert E. Lee did not directly demand Northrop's resignation but made it clear to Davis that he expected change when he was appointed general in chief. He wrote to the Secretary of War, "If some changes not made and the commissary department reorganized, I apprehend dire results. The physical strength of the men, if their courage survives, must fail under this treatment. Davis finally gave in and accepted Colonel Northrop's resignation. However, it was too late. Less than two months later, the well-supplied federal troops of the Army of the Potomac decisively defeated Lee's ill-fed army in the Battle of Five Forks, leading within days to the surrender at Appomattox.

Southern historian Bell I. Wiley, who specialized in examination of and research into the day-to-day experience of the combat troops of the American Civil War, grew to despise the tie between Davis and Northrop:

A considerable factor in the President's unpopularity with Congress and with the country at large was his persistent support of discredited officials. Unfortunately, some of those to whom he clung most tenaciously were men of mediocre abilities, while others were grossly incompetent. Lucius B. Northrop, the Confederate Commissary General, was, to say the least, not such a brilliant success as to be indispensable. Many leaders in the army, in Congress, and in the country at large came to regard him as hopelessly inefficient. But Davis had taken a stand for Northrop in the pre-war period, and he refused to heed the mounting criticism of him during the conflict. On January 18, 1865, J.B. Jones noted in his diary that Northrop was "still held by the president, contrary to the wishes of the entire Confederacy." Not until February, 1865, after the Confederate House of Representatives specifically demanded Northrop's dismissal, did Davis remove him. And he continued to defend him long after the clash of arms had ceased.

== Post-war service ==
After the war, Col. Northrop was arrested in Raleigh, North Carolina, on June 30, 1865, by the victorious Federals and confined for four months as an officer who had given aid and comfort to the Confederacy, and for the privations suffered by federal prisoners-of-war during Northrop's service as Commissary-General. After his release in November 1865, he lived in obscurity on a farm near Charlottesville, Virginia.

Beset by his continued knee problems and by the challenges of age-related disability, in 1890 he retired to the Maryland Line Confederate Soldiers' Home in Pikesville, Maryland, where he died. He is buried in New Cathedral Catholic Cemetery, Baltimore, Maryland.

== Northrop's papers ==
Collections of Northrop papers are maintained in the city libraries of New York City and Alexandria, Virginia.

== See also ==
- Abraham Myers, CSA quartermaster-general
