= Camp Izard =

U.S. Army fortification during the Seminole Wars

Coordinates: 29°5′N 82°25′W

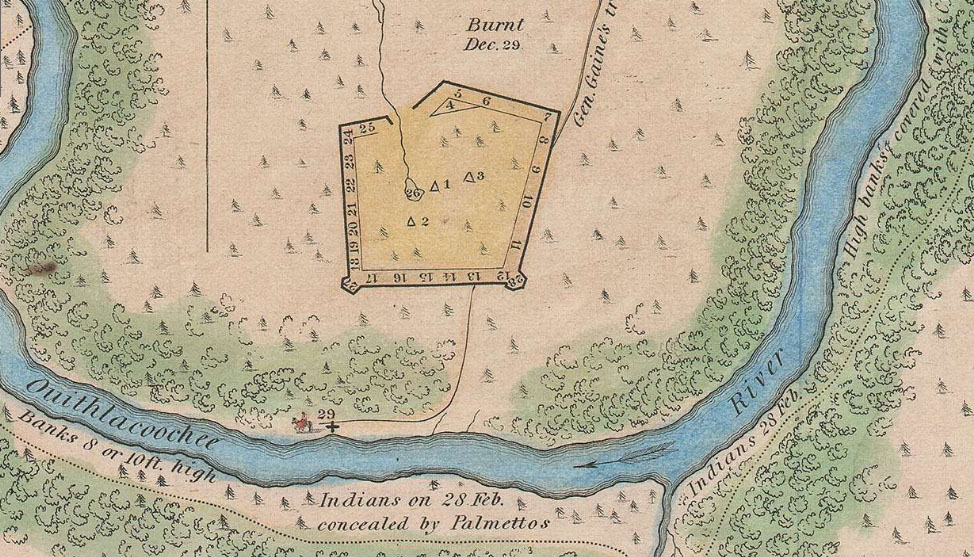
Camp Izard

Camp Izard, also written as Camp Izzard, was a fortification of the U.S. Army built along the Withlacoochee River (Ouithlacoochee) during the Seminole Wars. It is about 20 miles southwest of Ocala and had a cemetery. The site is now part of the Florida Seminole Wars Heritage Trail. It was named for Lieutenant James F. Izard after he was killed in combat with the Seminoles in the area February 1836.

In 1897, an annual picnic was reportedly held in the Camp Izard area. The Camp Izzard Boat Ramp is in the area.
