= Alexander Lawton =

American diplomat

Alexander Robert Lawton
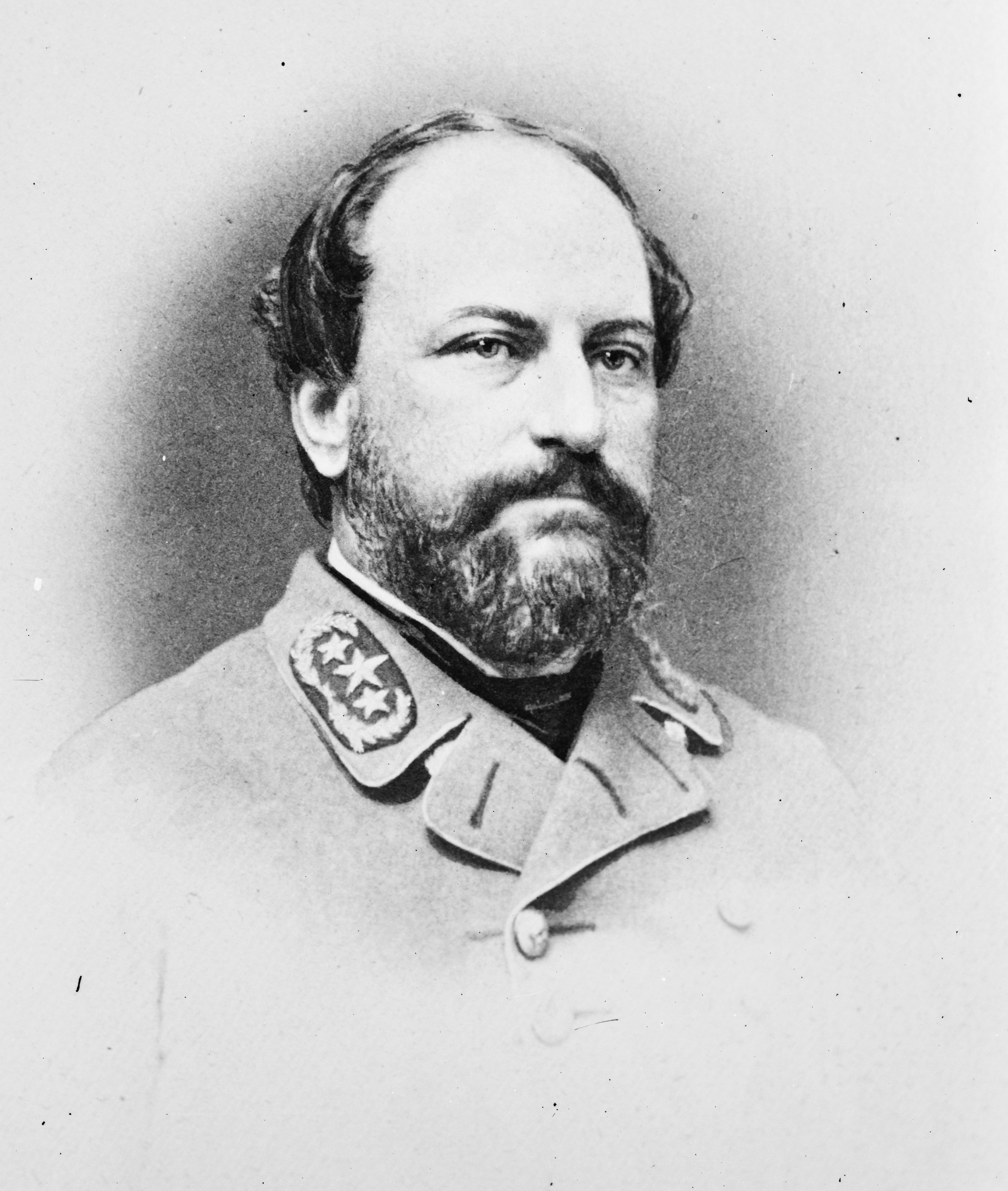
- Born: November 4, 1818; Beaufort County, South Carolina
- Died: July 2, 1896 (aged 77); Clifton Springs, New York
- Military career
- Allegiance: United States of America; Confederate States of America
- Branch: United States Army; Confederate States Army
- Service years: 1839–1841 (USA); 1861–1865 (CSA)
- Rank: Second Lieutenant (USA); Brigadier General (CSA)
- Commands: Quartermaster-General of the CSA
- Conflicts: American Civil War: Jackson's Valley Campaign; Seven Days' Battles; Second Battle of Bull Run; Battle of Antietam

Alexander Lawton

14th United States Minister to Austria-Hungary
- In office August 25, 1887 – May 15, 1889
- Preceded by: John M. Francis
- Succeeded by: Frederick Dent Grant

Alexander Robert Lawton (November 4, 1818 – July 2, 1896) was a Confederate lawyer, politician, diplomat, and brigadier general in the Confederate States Army during the American Civil War.

== Early life ==
Lawton was born in the Beaufort District of South Carolina. He was the son of Alexander James Lawton and Martha Mosse. He graduated from the United States Military Academy in 1839, placing 13th out of 31 in his class. He served as a second lieutenant in the 1st U.S. Artillery until resigning his commission in 1840 to study law. He attended the Harvard Law School, graduating in 1842. He settled in Savannah, Georgia, and entered the fields of law, railroad administration, and state politics.

== Civil War ==
Lawton favored Georgia's secession and became colonel of the 1st Georgia Volunteers. He commanded the Savannah troops that seized Fort Pulaski, the first conflict of the war in Georgia. He was commissioned a brigadier general in the Confederate Army on April 13, 1861, and commanded the forces guarding Georgia's seacoast before being reassigned to Virginia. He led his brigade effectively during Stonewall Jackson's Shenandoah Valley Campaign, the Seven Days Battles, and the Second Battle of Bull Run (Second Manassas). His last field service was at the Battle of Antietam (Sharpsburg), where he commanded the division of the wounded Maj. Gen. Richard S. Ewell. Lawton was seriously wounded early in the morning of September 17, 1862, while defending his portion of the Army of Northern Virginia's line. Initially carried from the field to a temporary hospital, he spent months at home recuperating.

In August 1863, Lawton became the Confederacy's second Quartermaster-General. Although he brought energy and resourcefulness to the position, he was unable to solve the problem of material shortages and poorly regulated railroads.

== Postbellum career ==
In the years after the Civil War, Lawton became increasingly important as a political figure in Georgia, serving in various administrative posts. He lost the 1880 election for the U.S. Senate in an election which seemed to represent a victory of the "New South" over the "Old South." He was chosen President of the American Bar Association in 1882. Five years later, he was appointed Minister to Austria-Hungary and left that post in 1889. Lawton died in Clifton Springs, New York.

== See also ==
- List of American Civil War generals (Confederate)
- Battle of Fort Pulaski, Background, "Department of Georgia"
- Spencer Lawton, descendent of Lawton

== Notes ==
Diplomatic posts
Preceded by Anthony M. Keiley	U.S. Minister to Austria-Hungary; 1887–1889	Succeeded by Frederick Dent Grant
