= Huse =

Huse is a surname. Notable people with the surname include:

- Brad Huse (born 1966), American basketball coach
- Caleb Huse (1831–1905), Confederate States Army officer
- Camilla Huse (born 1979), Norwegian footballer
- David A. Huse (born 1958), American theoretical physicist
- Harry M. P. Huse (1858–1942), United States Navy admiral
- Patrick Huse (born 1948), Norwegian painter
- Sibyl Marvin Huse (1866–1939), French-born American author and teacher

== See also ==
- USS Huse, a United States Navy Edsall-class destroyer escort
