= Sinclair, Hamilton and Company =

Sinclair, Hamilton & Company was a major arms dealer in Britain, and one of the two principal arms suppliers of the Confederacy during the American Civil War. The firm was established by Archibald Hamilton and his brother Robert in 1854 as a family business. During the war the firm often worked in conjunction with S. Isaac, Campbell & Company, the other primary supplier to the Confederate war effort. Both of these firms worked with Confederacy purchasing agents, Majors Caleb Huse and James Bulloch, sent to Britain by Josiah Gorgas, chief of the Confederate States War Department, to acquire badly needed arms for the Confederacy. These firms acted as commissioned purchasing and financial agents, middlemen, with the various arms manufacturers in England.

== Background ==
At the onset of war in 1861 the south had very little manufacturing potential and were in desperate need of arms, military ordnance and other supplies which it could not obtain from the industrialized north, now an enemy of the Confederate States. The Confederacy also lacked a navy in which to counter the Union blockade. Subsequently the Confederates looked to foreign sources to meet their enormous military needs, and turned to British arms manufactures who were already selling arms to a number of different European countries. The most serious problem confronting the Confederate army was arming its volunteer army. Arsenals in the South were only in possession of about 150,000 shoulder arms, most of which were only flint-lock muskets from the Revolutionary War era, with relatively few modern rifles, the likes of which were already in possession of the union Army.

== Supplying the Confederacy ==
Selected rifles supplied to the Confederate Army during the American Civil War

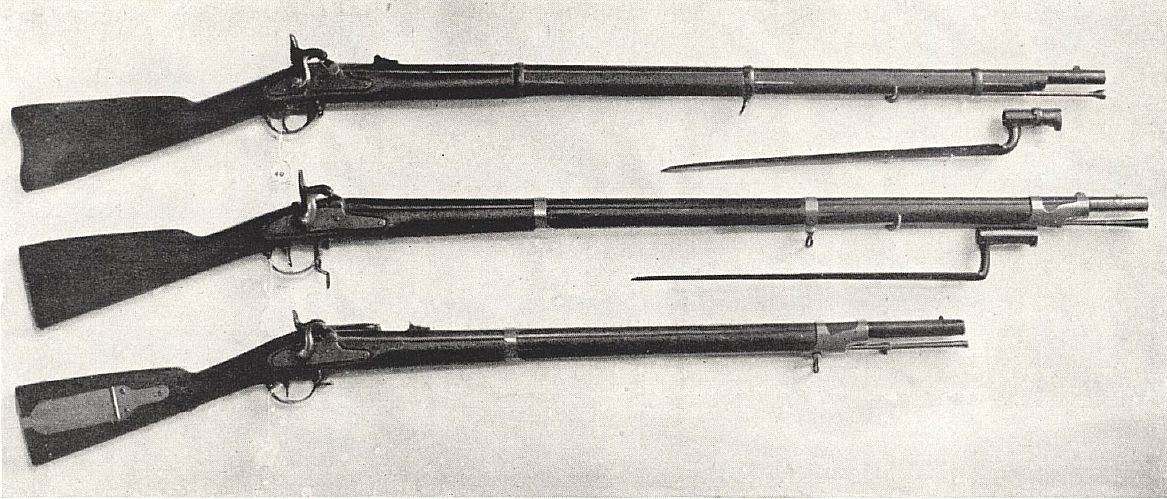
United States Flintlock Musket and Flintlock rifles

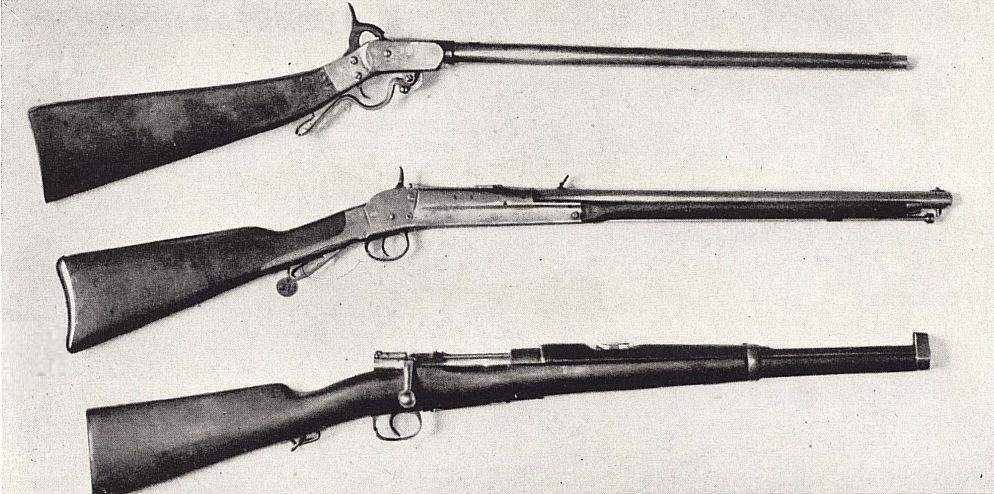
Modern Civil War guns (rifiled carbines) of 1863

The senior director of Sinclair, Hamilton and Company was Archibald Hamilton, a Confederate sympathizer, a senior director of the firm Fraser, Trenholm and Co, and an arms expert who was familiar with every arms manufacturer in England, and frequently arranged business with them. During this time he also served as the director of the London Armoury Company, another leading small arms purchasing house in London. Directors of Sinclair, Hamilton & Company included, Robert Adams, Richard Ashton, Archibald Cockburn, John Shorter, merchants, William Dray, an engineer and manufacturer, and George Fry who acted as solicitor.

Charles K. Prioleau, a senior partner of Trenholm, became interested in supplying the Confederacy in an attempt to salvage his business when the cotton trade, which was vital to both the economies of the Confederate states and the numerous mills in Lancashire, collapsed as a result of the Civil War and the Union Blockade. Prioleau's business dealings with the Confederacy involved sending arms and supplies to those states, and soon grew and was involved in the purchasing and outfitting warships for its war effort.

Many of the arms sold by Sinclair, Hamilton and Company came from Robert Taylor Pritchett, a British gun maker and inventor, and a business man who like many others arms dealers took advantage of the financial opportunities the American Civil War offered. Pritchett was well known for his designs and innovations of Enfield rifles.

== See also ==
- Blockade runners of the American Civil War -- how British arms reached the south.
- United Kingdom and the American Civil War
- Cotton diplomacy

== Bibliography ==
- Sinclair, arthur (1895). Two years on the Alabama. Boston: Lee and Shepard.
- Edwards, William B. (1962). Civil War Guns. The Stackpole Company.
- Jones, Gordon L. (2014). Confederate Odyssey: The George W. Wray Jr. Civil War Collection at the Atlanta History Center. University of Georgia Press. ISBN 978-0-8203-46854.
- Long, Renata Eley (2017). In the Shadow of the Alabama: The British Foreign Office and the American Civil War. Naval Institute Press. ISBN 978-1-6125-18374.
- Maness, Ron (Autumn 2020). "Agent of the Cotton War". Military Images. 38 (4). Ronald S. Coddington: 48–57. JSTOR 26925461.
- Maev Kennedy (August 10, 2009). "Grave found of man who bankrolled Confederates in American civil war". The Guardian. New York, New York.
- Sinclair, Arthur (1895). Two years on the Alabama. Boston : Lee and Shepard.
- Steaurt, Richard D. (September–October 1938). "Historic Military Firearms: As Preserved in the Bowie Collection at Fort McHenry". Army Ordnance. 19 (110). National Defense Industrial Association: 93–98. JSTOR 45376665.
- Wise, Stephen (1991). Lifeline of the Confederacy: Blockade Running During the Civil War. University of South Carolina Press. ISBN 978-0-8724-97993. Borrow book at: archive.org
