= United Kingdom and the American Civil War =

The United Kingdom of Great Britain and Ireland remained officially neutral throughout the American Civil War (1861–1865). It legally recognized the belligerent status of the Confederate States of America (CSA) but never recognized it as a nation and neither signed a treaty with it nor ever exchanged ambassadors. Over 90 percent of Confederate trade with Britain ended, causing a severe shortage of cotton by 1862. Private British blockade runners sent munitions and luxuries to Confederate ports in return for cotton and tobacco. In Manchester, the massive reduction of available American cotton caused an economic disaster referred to as the Lancashire Cotton Famine. Despite the high unemployment, some Manchester cotton workers refused out of principle to process any cotton from America, leading to direct praise from President Lincoln. Top British officials debated offering to mediate in the first 18 months, which the Confederacy wanted but the United States strongly rejected.

Large-scale trade continued between Britain and the US. The US shipped grain to Britain, and Britain sold manufactured items and munitions to the US. British trade with the Confederacy fell over 90% from the prewar period, with a small amount of cotton going to Britain and hundreds of thousands of munitions and luxury goods slipped in by numerous small blockade runners operated and funded by British private interests.

The Confederate strategy for securing independence was based largely on the hope of military intervention by Britain and France. A serious diplomatic dispute erupted over the "Trent Affair" in late 1861 but was resolved peacefully after five weeks.

British intervention was likely only in co-operation with France, which had an imperialistic venture underway in Mexico. The possibility of recognizing the Confederacy was brought up in the summer and fall of 1863 in response to offensives in the east and west, but the Union victory at the Battle of Antietam and Republicans holding on in the 1862 midterms discouraged such moves. By 1863, intervention was no longer seriously considered, as Britain turned its attention elsewhere, especially toward Russia and Greece. The costly and controversial Crimean War (October 1853 to February 1856) was in the still-recent past, at the outbreak of the American conflict. The United Kingdom had major commitments in British India in the wake of the Indian Rebellion of 1857. France had major imperial ambitions outside of the Western Hemisphere, and was considering or had already commenced military ventures in Morocco, China, Vietnam, North Africa, and Italy.

A long-term issue was the sales of arms and warships to the Confederacy. Despite vehement protests from the US, Britain did not stop the sales of its arms and warships for the Confederacy, including the CSS Alabama. The Alabama Claims were partially resolved peacefully after the Civil War when the US was awarded $15.5 million in arbitration by an international tribunal only for damages caused by the warships.

In the end, British involvement did not significantly affect the outcome of the war. The US diplomatic mission, headed by Minister Charles Francis Adams Sr., proved to be much more successful than the Confederate missions, which were never officially recognized by Britain.

== Confederate policies ==
Early in the war, Confederate opinion, led by President Jefferson Davis, was dominated by "King Cotton," the idea that British dependence on cotton for its large textile industry would lead to diplomatic recognition and mediation or military intervention. The Confederates had not sent out agents ahead of time to ascertain if the King Cotton policy would be effective. Instead, it was by popular demand, not government action, that shipments of cotton to Europe were ended in spring 1861. When the Confederate diplomats arrived, they tried to convince British leaders that the Union blockade was an illegal paper blockade. Historian Charles Hubbard writes:

Davis left foreign policy to others in government and, rather than developing an aggressive diplomatic effort, tended to expect events to accomplish diplomatic objectives. The new president was committed to the notion that cotton would secure recognition and legitimacy from the powers of Europe. The men Davis selected as secretary of state and emissaries to Europe were chosen for political and personal reasons – not for their diplomatic potential. This was due, in part, to the belief that cotton could accomplish the Confederate objectives with little help from Confederate diplomats.

Hubbard added that Davis's policy was stubborn and coercive. The King Cotton strategy was resisted by the Europeans. Secretary of War Judah Benjamin and Secretary of the Treasury Christopher Memminger warned in vain that cotton should be immediately exported to build up foreign credits.

== Union policies ==
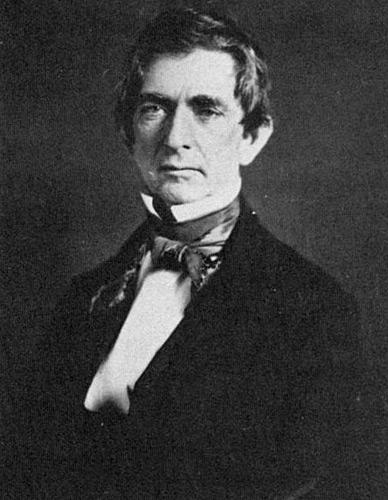
U.S. Secretary of State William H. Seward (c. 1850)

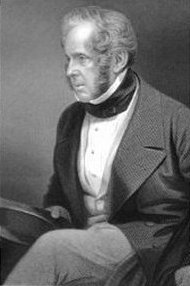
British Prime Minister Lord Palmerston

The Union's main goal in foreign affairs was to maintain friendly relations and large-scale trade with the world and to prevent any official recognition of the Confederacy by any country, especially Britain. Other concerns included preventing the Confederacy from buying foreign-made warships; gaining European support for policies against slavery; and attracting immigrant laborers, farmers, and soldiers. Prior to the war's outbreak, Anglo-American relations had been cordial; the issues of Oregon, Texas and the border between the United States and British North America were all resolved peacefully, and trade was brisk. Secretary of State William H. Seward, the primary architect of the Union's foreign policy, was intent on maintaining the principles that had served America well since the Revolution: "non-intervention by the United States in the affairs of other countries and resistance to foreign intervention in the affairs of the United States and other countries in this hemisphere."

== British policies ==
British public opinion was divided on the American Civil War, though historians have noted that most Britons did not express an opinion on the matter. The Confederacy tended to have disproportionate support from the Catholic, and Irish, with one national petition of 300,000 signatories in support of secession having almost half its support from the Irish, and Catholic clergy, a demographics that made up less than 25% of the 28.8 million population of the United Kingdom of Great Britain and Ireland (1861: Britain: 23, Ireland: 5.8 million). Similarly it is noted approximately 40,000 Irishmen (0.1% of the population), and 10,000 Englishmen (0.04% of the population) would sign on to serve the Confederacy, while 170,000 Irish (2.9% of the population), and 50,000 British (0.2% of the population) would fight for the Union, a ratio of 4.6:1 in favour of Union service. Of the 658 MPs sitting in the Commons in 1861, twenty one (3%) would join the Manchester headquartered, Confederacy supporting, Southern Independence Association, as would ten Lords. Others assert elites: the aristocracy and the landed gentry, which identified with the Southern planter class, and Anglican clergy and some professionals who admired tradition, hierarchy and paternalism. The Union was favored by the middle classes, the religious Nonconformists, intellectuals, reformers and most factory workers, who saw slavery and forced labor as a threat to the status of the working man.

As for the government, Chancellor of the Exchequer William Ewart Gladstone, whose family fortune had been based on slavery in the West Indies before 1833, supported the Confederacy. Foreign Minister Lord Russell wanted neutrality. Prime Minister Lord Palmerston wavered between support for national independence, his opposition to slavery and the strong economic advantages of Britain remaining neutral.

Even before the war started, Lord Palmerston pursued a policy of neutrality. His international concerns were centered in Europe, where he had to watch both Napoleon III's ambitions in Europe and Otto von Bismarck's rise in Prussia. There were also serious problems involving Italy, Poland, Russia, Denmark and China. British reactions to American events were shaped by past British policies and their own national interests, both strategically and economically. In the Western Hemisphere, as relations with the United States improved, Britain had become cautious about confronting it over issues in Central America. As a naval power, Britain had a long record of insisting that neutral nations abide by its blockades, a perspective that led from the earliest days of the war to de facto support for the Union blockade and frustration in the South.

Diplomatic observers were suspicious of British motives. The Russian Minister in Washington, Eduard de Stoeckl, noted, "The Cabinet of London is watching attentively the internal dissensions of the Union and awaits the result with an impatience which it has difficulty in disguising." De Stoeckl advised his government that Britain would recognize the Confederacy at its earliest opportunity. Cassius Clay, the United States Minister in Russia, stated, "I saw at a glance where the feeling of England was. They hoped for our ruin! They are jealous of our power. They care neither for the South nor the North. They hate both."

Lincoln appointed Charles Francis Adams Sr., as minister to Britain. An important part of his mission was to make clear to the British that the war was a strictly internal insurrection and afforded the Confederacy no rights under international law. Any movement by Britain to recognizing the Confederacy officially would be considered an unfriendly act toward the US. Seward's instructions to Adams included the suggestion that it should be made clear to Britain that a nation with widely scattered possessions, as well as a homeland that included Scotland and Ireland, should be very wary of "set[ting] a dangerous precedent."

Lord Lyons was appointed as the British minister to the United States in April 1859. An Oxford graduate, he had two decades of diplomatic experience before being given the American post. Lyons, like many British leaders, had reservations about Seward and shared them freely in his correspondence, which was widely circulated within the British government. As early as January 7, 1861, well before the Lincoln administration had even assumed office, Lyons wrote to British Foreign Secretary Lord Russell about Seward:

I cannot help fearing that he will be a dangerous foreign minister. His view of the relations between the United States and Britain had always been that they are a good material to make political capital of.... I do not think Mr. Seward would contemplate actually going to war with us, but he would be well disposed to play the old game of seeking popularity here by displaying violence toward us.

Despite his distrust of Seward, throughout 1861, Lyons maintained a "calm and measured" diplomacy that contributed to a peaceful resolution to the Trent crisis.

== Slavery and trade with the Confederacy ==
The Confederate States came into existence after seven of the fifteen slave states seceded because of the election of Republican President Lincoln, whose party committed to the containment of slavery geographically and the weakening of slaveowners' political power. Slavery was the cornerstone of the South's plantation economy, although it was repugnant to the moral sensibilities of most people in Britain, which had abolished slavery in its Empire in 1833. Until the fall of 1862, the immediate end of slavery was not an issue in the war; in fact, some Union states (Kentucky, Maryland, Missouri, Delaware, and what became West Virginia) allowed slavery. In 1861, Missouri had sought to extradite an escaped slave from Canada to face trial for a murder committed in his flight for which some in Britain falsely believed the punishment was to be burned alive.

Lincoln's Emancipation Proclamation, announced in preliminary form in September 1862, made ending slavery an objective of the war and caused European intervention on the side of the South to be unpopular. However, some British leaders expected it would cause a large-scale race war that might need foreign intervention. Gladstone opened a cabinet debate over whether Britain should intervene, emphasizing the humanitarian intervention to stop the staggering death toll, risk of a race war, and failure of the Union to achieve decisive military results. Ultimately, the cabinet decided that the American situation was less urgent than the need to contain Russian expansion, so it rejected intervention.

During the Civil War, several British arms companies and financial firms secretly conducted business with Confederate agents in Europe, supplying the Confederacy with badly needed arms and military wares throughout the conflict, in exchange for Southern cotton. Companies like Trenholm, Fraser & Company also provided funding for British shipyards which built blockade runners used for running the Union blockade to import badly needed cotton which textile factories in Britain were heavily dependent on. British companies like Sinclair, Hamilton and Company, S. Isaac, Campbell & Company, London Armoury Company and others were the primary suppliers of arms and military supplies, frequently extending credit to Confederate agents for them to make such purchases. One historian estimated that these actions extended the Civil War by two years and cost 400,000 more lives of Union and Confederate soldiers and civilians.

== Trent Affair ==
Outright war and British recognition of the Confederacy was a possibility in late 1861, when the U.S. Navy took control of a British mail ship and seized two Confederate diplomats. Confederate President Jefferson Davis had named James M. Mason and John Slidell as commissioners to represent Confederate interests in England and France. They went to Havana, in Spanish Cuba, where they took passage for England on the British mail steamer RMS Trent. The American warship USS San Jacinto under Captain Charles Wilkes was looking for them.

It was generally then agreed that a nation at war had the right to stop and search a neutral merchant ship if it suspected that ship of carrying the enemy's dispatches. Mason and Slidell, Wilkes reasoned, were in effect Confederate dispatches and so he had the right to remove them. On November 8, 1861, he fired twice across the bow of the Trent, sent a boat's crew aboard, seized the Confederate commissioners, and bore them off in triumph to the US, where they were held prisoner in Boston. Wilkes was hailed as a national hero.

Britain's shortage of cotton was partially made up by imports from India and Egypt; Punch cartoon November 16, 1861.

The violation of British neutral rights triggered an uproar in Britain. Britain sent 17,500 troops to Canada, oversaw the recruitment of Canadian militiamen, formed a War Committee, and put the British fleet on a war footing, with plans to blockade New York City and other coastal areas if war broke out. In addition, the British put an embargo on the export of saltpetre which the US needed to make gunpowder. Approximately 90% of the world's natural reserves of saltpetre were in British territory and the US had a purchasing commission in London buying up every ounce it could get. A sharp note was dispatched to Washington to demand the return of the prisoners as an apology. Initially, the note was an ultimatum that specifically blamed the Lincoln administration for ordering Wilkes to seize the Trent and would have expelled the American ambassador in London, which would lead to war between Britain and America. However, the intervention of Queen Victoria's dying consort, Prince Albert of Saxe-Coburg, would soften the initial British response by suggesting that Wilkes acted without the permission of the US government and would ask them to release the detained envoys. Lincoln, concerned about Britain entering the war, ignored anti-British sentiment, issued what the British interpreted as an apology without actually apologizing, and ordered the prisoners to be released.

United States, while importing saltpetre and gunpowder from Britain, was also providing Britain with over 40% of its wheat imports during the war years, and suspension would have caused severe disruption to its food supply. Britain imported about 25–30% of its grain ("corn" in British English), and poor crops in 1861 and 1862 in France made Britain even more dependent on shiploads from New York City. Furthermore, British banks and financial institutions in the City of London had financed many projects such as railways in the US. There were fears that war would result in enormous financial losses as investments were lost and loans defaulted on.

Britain's shortage of cotton was partially made up by imports from India and Egypt by 1863. The Trent Affair led to the Lyons-Seward Treaty of 1862, an agreement to clamp down hard on the Atlantic slave trade by using the US Navy and the Royal Navy.

== Possibility of recognizing Confederacy ==
Outside of the Trent Affair, the other possibility of recognizing the Confederacy came to the fore late in the summer and fall of 1862. At that time, as far as any European could see, the war seemed to be a stalemate. The US attempt to capture the Confederate capital had failed, and in the east and west alike, the Confederates were on the offensive. Charles Francis Adams Sr., warned Washington that the British government might very soon offer to mediate the difficulty between North and South, which would be a polite but effective way of intimating that in the opinion of Britain, the fight had gone on long enough and should be ended by giving the South what it wanted. Recognition, as Adams warned, risked all-out war with the United States. War would involve an invasion of Canada, a full-scale American attack on British shipping interests worldwide, an end to American grain shipments that were providing a large part of the British food supply, and an end to British sales of machinery and supplies to the US. The British leadership, however, thought that if the Union armies were decisively defeated, the US might soften its position and accept mediation.

Earl Russell, British Foreign Secretary, had given Mason no encouragement, but after news of the Second Battle of Bull Run reached London in early September, Palmerston agreed that in late September, there could be a cabinet meeting at which Palmerston and Russell would ask approval of the mediation proposal. Then, Russell and Palmerston decided not to bring the plan before the cabinet until they got further word about Lee's invasion of the North. Eventually, the British under Palmerston and Russell would compile a mediation proposal with France's Napoleon III and Austria-Hungary's Franz Joseph I in which all three parties would diplomatically recognize the Confederacy and mediate peace with the Union. If the Northerners were beaten, the proposal would go through; if Lee failed, it might be well to wait a little longer before taking any action.

The British working-class population, most notably the British cotton workers who suffered the Lancashire Cotton Famine, remained consistently opposed to the Confederacy. A resolution of support was passed by the inhabitants of Manchester and sent to Lincoln. His letter of reply has become famous:

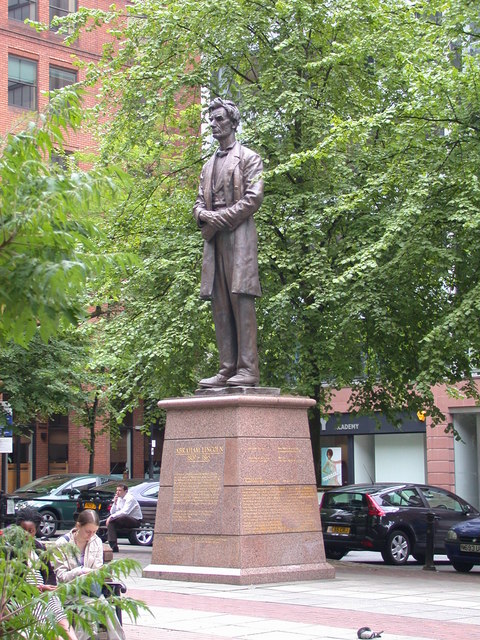
This statue of US President Abraham Lincoln in Manchester, England, commemorates the support of local cotton workers for the Union

I know and deeply deplore the sufferings which the working people of Manchester and in all Europe are called to endure in this crisis. It has been often and studiously represented that the attempt to overthrow this Government which was built on the foundation of human rights, and to substitute for it one which should rest exclusively on the basis of slavery, was likely to obtain the favor of Europe.

Through the action of disloyal citizens, the working people of Europe have been subjected to a severe trial for the purpose of forcing their sanction to that attempt. Under the circumstances I cannot but regard your decisive utterances on the question as an instance of sublime Christian heroism which has not been surpassed in any age or in any country. It is indeed an energetic and re-inspiring assurance of the inherent truth and of the ultimate and universal triumph of justice, humanity and freedom.

I hail this interchange of sentiments, therefore, as an augury that, whatever else may happen, whatever misfortune may befall your country or my own, the peace and friendship which now exists between the two nations will be, as it shall be my desire to make them, perpetual.

— Abraham Lincoln, 19 January 1863

There is now a statue of Lincoln in Albert Square, Manchester with an extract from his letter carved on the plinth.

Lincoln became a hero amongst the British working class with progressive views. His portrait, often alongside that of Garibaldi, adorned many parlour walls. One can still be seen in the boyhood home of David Lloyd George, now part of the Lloyd George Museum.

The decisive factor, in the fall of 1862 and increasingly thereafter was the Battle of Antietam and what grew out of it. Lee's invasion was a failure at Antietam, and he barely escaped back to Virginia. It was now obvious that no final, conclusive Confederate triumph could be anticipated. Thus, the British held off from recognizing the Confederacy.

Richard Cobden was prominent among anti-interventionist politician and, in a speech in 1862, declared that "‘it would be cheaper to keep the whole population of the cotton districts [...] on turtle, champagne and venison than to send to America to obtain cotton by force of arms".

== Emancipation Proclamation ==
During the late spring and early summer of 1862, as the war dragged on and the Confederates used their slaves to aid their war effort, Lincoln decided that emancipation was (to quote the Emancipation Proclamation) "a fit and necessary war measure for suppressing [the] rebellion". Lincoln drafted the Preliminary Emancipation Proclamation and waited for a battlefield victory to announce it. The Battle of Antietam gave Lincoln a victory, and on September 22, he issued the Preliminary Emancipation Proclamation, giving the states that had seceded 100 days to return to the Union or, on January 1, 1863, all slaves held in areas in rebellion would be free. On that date, Lincoln issued the Final Emancipation Proclamation, which, in addition to freeing the slaves in the states in rebellion, allowed them to "be received into the armed service of the United States", thereby further helping the Union war effort.

William Ewart Gladstone, the Chancellor of the Exchequer and a senior Liberal leader, had accepted slavery in his youth; his family had grown wealthy through the ownership of slaves in the West Indies. However, the idea of slavery was abhorrent to him, and his idea was to civilise all nations. He strongly spoke out for Confederate independence. When the Emancipation Proclamation was announced, he tried to make the counterargument that an independent Confederacy would do a better job of freeing the slaves than an invading northern army would. He warned that a race war was imminent and would justify British intervention. Emancipation also alarmed the British Foreign Secretary Lord John Russell, who expected a bloody slave uprising. The question then would be British intervention with the assistance of France and Austria-Hungary on humanitarian grounds. However, there was no slave uprising and no race war. The Republicans winning the 1862 midterm elections rejected any form of peace and recognition of Confederate independence. The advice of the war minister against going to war with United States, as well as the tide of British public opinion, convinced the cabinet to take no action.

== Confederate diplomacy ==
Once the war with the US began, the best hope for the survival of the Confederacy was military intervention by Britain and France. The US realized that as well and made it clear that recognition of the Confederacy meant war and the end of food shipments into Britain. The Confederates who had believed in "King Cotton" (Britain had to support the Confederacy to obtain cotton for its industries) were proven wrong. Britain, in fact, had ample stores of cotton in 1861 and depended much more on grain from the US.

During its existence, the Confederate government sent repeated delegations to Europe; historians do not give them high marks for diplomatic skills. James M. Mason was sent to London as Confederate minister to Queen Victoria, and John Slidell was sent to Paris as minister to Napoleon III. Both were able to obtain private meetings with high British and French officials, but they failed to secure official recognition for the Confederacy. Britain and the US were at sword's point during the Trent Affair in late 1861. Mason and Slidell had been seized from a British ship by an American warship. Queen Victoria's husband, Prince Albert, helped calm the situation, and Lincoln released Mason and Slidell and so the episode was no help to the Confederacy.

Throughout the early years of the war, British foreign secretary Lord Russell, Napoleon III, and, to a lesser extent, British Prime Minister Lord Palmerston, explored the risks and advantages of recognition of the Confederacy or at least offering a mediation. Recognition meant certain war with the US, loss of American grain, loss of exports, loss of investments in American securities, potential invasion of Canada and other North American colonies, higher taxes, and a threat to the British merchant marine with little to gain in return. Many party leaders and the general public wanted no war with such high costs and meager benefits. Recognition was considered following the Second Battle of Manassas, when the British government was preparing to mediate in the conflict with France and Austria-Hungary, but the Union victory at the Battle of Antietam and Republican success in the 1862 midterms, combined with internal opposition, caused the government to back away.

In 1863, the Confederacy expelled all foreign consuls (all of them British or French diplomats) for advising their subjects to refuse to serve in combat against the US.

Throughout the war, all European powers adopted a policy of neutrality, meeting informally with Confederate diplomats but withholding diplomatic recognition. None ever sent an ambassador or official delegation to Richmond. However, they applied principles of international law and recognized both sides as belligerents. Canada allowed both Confederate and Union agents to work openly within its borders.

== Postwar adjustments and Alabama claims ==
Northerners were outraged at British tolerance of non-neutral acts, especially the building of warships and blockade runners smuggling weapons to the South. The United States at first only demanded vast reparations for "direct damages" caused by British-built commerce raiders, especially CSS Alabama. Senator Charles Sumner of Massachusetts, the chairman of the U.S. Senate Foreign Relations Committee, also demanded that "indirect damages" be included, specifically the British blockade runners.

However, Palmerston bluntly refused to pay, and the dispute continued for years after the war. After Palmerston's death, Prime Minister Gladstone agreed to include the US war claims in treaty discussions on other pending issues, such as fishing rights and border disputes. In 1872, pursuant to the resultant Treaty of Washington, an international arbitration board awarded $15,500,000 to the US only for "direct damages" caused by British-built Confederate ships, and the British apologized for the destruction but admitted no guilt.

== Long-term impact ==
The Union victory emboldened the forces in Britain that demanded more democracy and public input into the political system. The resulting Reform Act 1867 enfranchised the urban working class men in England and Wales, thus weakening the upper-class landed gentry, who identified more with the Southern planters. Influential commentators included Walter Bagehot, Thomas Carlyle, John Stuart Mill and Anthony Trollope. Additionally, many British and Irish men saw service in both the Union and Confederate State Army.

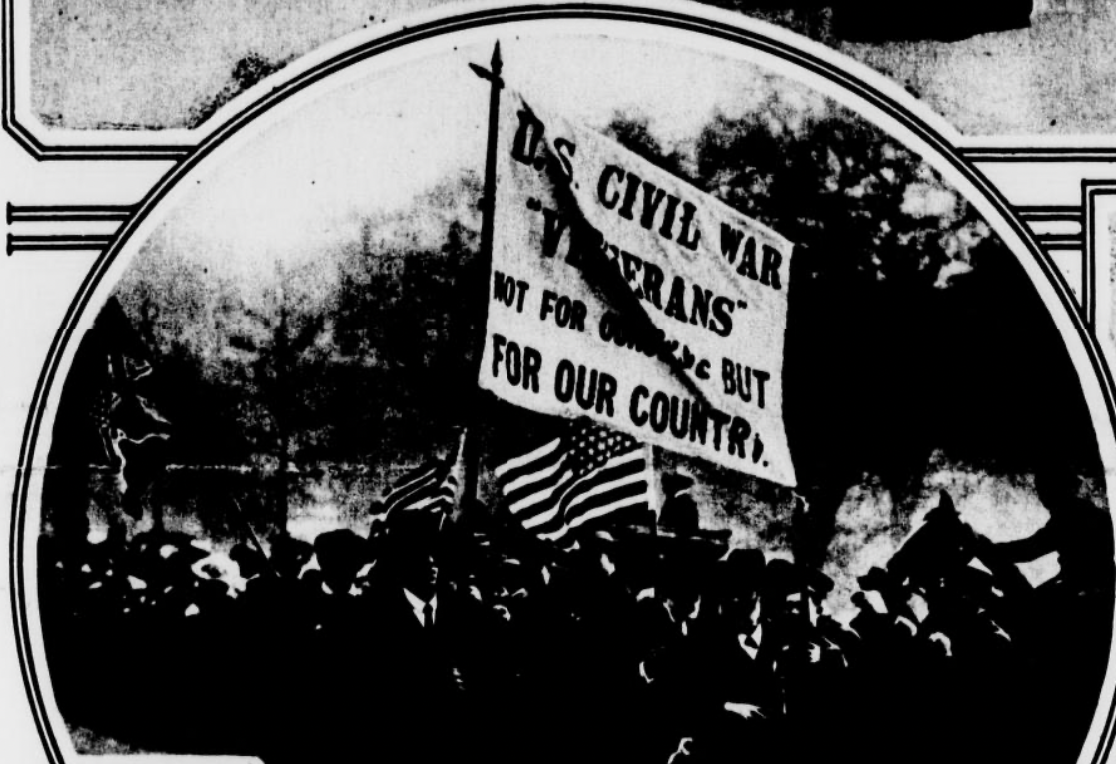
American Civil War Veterans living in Britain greeting American troops in World War 1

== Popular culture ==
- Song: "Our Neutral Friend" on IMSLP

== See also ==
- Journal of a Residence on a Georgian Plantation in 1838–1839
- United Kingdom–United States relations
- France and the American Civil War
- Canada and the American Civil War
- Bahamas and the American Civil War
- Blockade runners of the American Civil War
- Timeline of British diplomatic history
- International relations (1814–1919)
- Foreign enlistment in the American Civil War

== Bibliography ==
- Adams, Ephraim Douglass. Great Britain and the American Civil War (2 vol. 1925) online
- Berwanger, Eugene H. The British Foreign Service and the American Civil War. (1994), the diplomats and consuls
- Blackett, R. J. M. Divided Hearts: Britain and the American Civil War (2001) 273 pp
- Bourne Kenneth. Britain and the Balance of Power in North America, 1815–1908. (1967)
- Bourne, Kenneth. "British Preparations for War with the North, 1861–1862," The English Historical Review Vol 76 No 301 (Oct 1961) pp 600–632 in JSTOR
- Brauer, Kinley J. "The Slavery Problem in the Diplomacy of the American Civil War," Pacific Historical Review, Vol. 46, No. 3 (Aug. 1977), pp. 439–469 in JSTOR
- Brauer, Kinley J. "British Mediation and the American Civil War: A Reconsideration," Journal of Southern History, Vol. 38, No. 1 (Feb. 1972), pp. 49–64 in JSTOR
- Campbell, Duncan Andrew, English Public Opinion and the American Civil War (2003)
- Cleland, Beau. "Sustaining the Confederacy: Informal Diplomacy, Anglo-Confederate Relations, and Blockade-Running in the Bahamas." Journal of Southern History 89.1 (2023): 61-88.
- Cook Adrian. The Alabama Claims: American Politics and Anglo-American Relations, 1861–1872. (1975)
- Crook, David Paul. The North, the South, and the Powers, 1861–1865 (1974.)
- Crook, D. P. Diplomacy During the American Civil War. (1975).
- Doyle, Don. The Cause of All Nations: An International History of the American Civil War (2014)
- Duberman Martin B. Charles Francis Adams, 1807–1886 (1961)
- Dubrulle, Hugh. Ambivalent nation: how Britain imagined the American Civil War (LSU Press, 2018) online.
- Edwards, Sam. "‘From here Lincoln came’: Anglo-Saxonism, the special relationship, and the anglicisation of Abraham Lincoln, c. 1860–1970." Journal of Transatlantic Studies 11.1 (2013): 22–46.
- Eichhorn, Niels. Liberty and Slavery: European Separatists, Southern Secession, and the American Civil War (LSU Press, 2019) online
- Eichhorn, Niels. "North Atlantic Trade in the Mid-Nineteenth Century: A Case for Peace during the American Civil War." Civil War History 61.2 (2015): 138–172. Role of British and French trade patterns.
- Eichhorn, Niels. "The Intervention Crisis of 1862: A British Diplomatic Dilemma?" American Nineteenth Century History (2014) 15#3 pp 287–310. doi:10.1080/14664658.2014.959819.
- Ferris, Norman B. Desperate Diplomacy: William H. Seward's Foreign Policy, 1861. (1976) 265 pp, scholarly study of 1861.
- Ferris, Norman B. The Trent Affair: A Diplomatic Crisis (1977) standard history
- Foreman, Amanda. A World on Fire: Britain's Crucial Role in the American Civil War (Random House, 2011), 958 pp.
- Fuller, Howard J., Clad in Iron: The American Civil War and the Challenge of British Naval Power (Praeger, 2007), 448 pp.
  - Geoffrey Wheatcroft, "How the British Nearly Supported the Confederacy," New York Times Sunday Book Review June 30, 2011 online
- Gentry, Judith Fenner. "A Confederate Success in Europe: The Erlanger Loan," Journal of Southern History, 36#2 (1970), pp. 157–188 in JSTOR
- George, David M. "John Baxter Langley: radicalism, espionage and the Confederate Navy in mid-Victorian Britain." Journal for Maritime Research 19.2 (2017): 121–142.
- Ginzberg, Eli. "The Economics of British Neutrality during the American Civil War," Agricultural History, Vol. 10, No. 4 (Oct. 1936), pp. 147–156 JSTOR 3739625
- Gougeon, Len. Old England, New England, and the Civil War: How a Clash of Cultures Ignited a Global Campaign for Racial Equality and Civil Rights (State University of New York Press, 2025).
- Hahn, Barbara; Baker, Bruce E. (2010). "Cotton". Virginia Center for Civil War Studies at Virginia Tech.
- Hubbard, Charles M. The Burden of Confederate Diplomacy (1998) 271 pp
- Hyman, Harold Melvin. Heard Round the World; the Impact Abroad of the Civil War. (1969).
- Jenkins, Brian. Britain & the War for the Union. (2 vol 1974), by Canadian scholar
- Jones, Howard (1992). Union in Peril. UNC Press Books. ISBN 0-8078-2048-2.
- Jones, Howard (January 1, 1999). Abraham Lincoln and a New Birth of Freedom. U of Nebraska Press. ISBN 0-8032-2582-2.
- Jones, Howard (2010). Blue and Gray Diplomacy: A History of Union and Confederate Foreign Relations. Chapel Hill, NC: U. of North Carolina Press. Archived from the original on December 26, 2014 – via Questia.
- Jones, Wilbur Devereux. "The British Conservatives and the American Civil War," American Historical Review, (1953) 58#3 pp. 527–543 in JSTOR
- Kinser, Brent E. The American Civil War in the Shaping of British Democracy (Routledge, 2016).
- Lester, Richard I. Confederate Finance and Purchasing in Great Britain. (1975).
- Loy, Wesley (October 1997). "10 Rumford Place: Doing Confederate Business in Liverpool". The South Carolina Historical Magazine. 98 (4). South Carolina Historical Society: 349–374. JSTOR 27570268.
- Lorimer, Douglas A. "The Role of Anti-Slavery Sentiment in English Reactions to the American Civil War," Historical Journal, Vol. 19, No. 2 (Jun. 1976), pp. 405–420 in JSTOR
- Macdonald, Helen Grace. Canadian Public Opinion and the American Civil War (1926)
- Mahin, Dean B. One war at a time: The international dimensions of the American Civil War (Brassey's, 1999)
- Mendelsohn, Adam (2012). "Samuel and Saul Isaac: International Jewish Arms Dealers, Blockade Runners, and Civil War Profiteers" (PDF). Journal of the Southern Jewish Historical Society. 15. Southern Jewish Historical Society: 41–79.
- Merli, Frank, and Theodore A. Wilson. "The British Cabinet and the Confederacy." Maryland Historical Magazine 65.3 (1970): 239–262
- Merli, Frank J. The Alabama, British Neutrality, and the American Civil War. (2004). 225 pp.
- Merli, Frank J. Great Britain and the Confederate Navy, 1861–1865 (1971) 360 pp
- Morgan, Simon James. "John Bright in Anglo-American relations: why an English radical became an American hero." Journal of Transatlantic Studies (2025): 1-24. online
- Morton, W. L. The Critical Years: The Union of British North America, 1857–1873 (1964), on Canada
- Myers, Phillip. Caution and Cooperation: The American Civil War in British-American Relations. (Kent State UP, 2008). 340 pp excerpt
- Nevins, Allan. "Britain, France and the War Issues." In Allan Nevins, The War for the Union: War Becomes Revolution, 1862–1863, (1960) pp. 242–274, excellent summary
- O’Connor, Peter. "Defending the indefensible?: The pro-confederate lobby in Britain in the aftermath of the emancipation proclamation." Journal of Transatlantic Studies 19.2 (2021): 167-188.
- Oldfield, John. The Ties that Bind: Transatlantic Abolitionism in the Age of Reform, c.1820–1865 (Liverpool University Press, 2020).
- Owsley, Frank Lawrence. King Cotton Diplomacy: Foreign Relations of the Confederate States of America (1931) online
- Palen, Marc-William. "The Civil War's Forgotten Transatlantic Tariff Debate and the Confederacy's Free Trade Diplomacy." Journal of the Civil War War 3.1 (2013): 35–61.
- Peraino, Kevin. "Lincoln vs. Palmerston" in his Lincoln in the World: The Making of a Statesman and the Dawn of American Power (2013) pp 120–169.
- Poast, Paul. "Lincoln's Gamble: Fear of Intervention and the Onset of the American Civil War." Security Studies 24.3 (2015): 502–527. online
- Reid, Brian Holden. "Power, Sovereignty, and the Great Republic: Anglo-American Diplomatic Relations in the Era of the Civil War" Diplomacy & Statecraft (2003) 14#2 pp 45–76.
- Reid, Brian Holden. "'A Signpost That Was Missed'? Reconsidering British Lessons from the American Civil War," Journal of Military History 70#2 (2006), pp. 385–414.
- Reid, Robert L. "William E. Gladstone's 'Insincere Neutrality' During The Civil War." Civil War History (1969) 15#4 pp 293–307.
- Ridley, Jasper. Lord Palmerston (1971) pp 548–562.
- Sebrell, T.E. (2014). Persuading John Bull: Union and Confederate Propaganda in Britain, 1860–65. Lexington Books. ISBN 978-0-7391-8511-7.
- Smith, Adam I.P. "The 'Cult' of Abraham Lincoln and the Strange Survival of Liberal England in the Era of the World Wars," Twentieth Century British History (2010) 21#4 pp 486–509, how Lincoln became a hero to the British
- Stahr, Walter. Seward: Lincoln's Indispensable Man (2012), scholarly biography.
- Turner, Michael. Stonewall Jackson, Beresford Hope, and the Meaning of the American Civil War in Britain (LSU Press, 2020).
- Van Deusen, Glyndon G. William Henry Seward (1967), scholarly biography. online
- Warren, Gordon H. Fountain of Discontent: The Trent Affair and Freedom of the Seas (1981), 317 pp, based on extensive archival work
- Winks Robin W. Canada and the United States: The Civil War Years. (1971).
