= Abercromby Square =

Georgian square in Liverpool, UK

Coordinates: 53°24′11.5″N 2°57′50.9″W

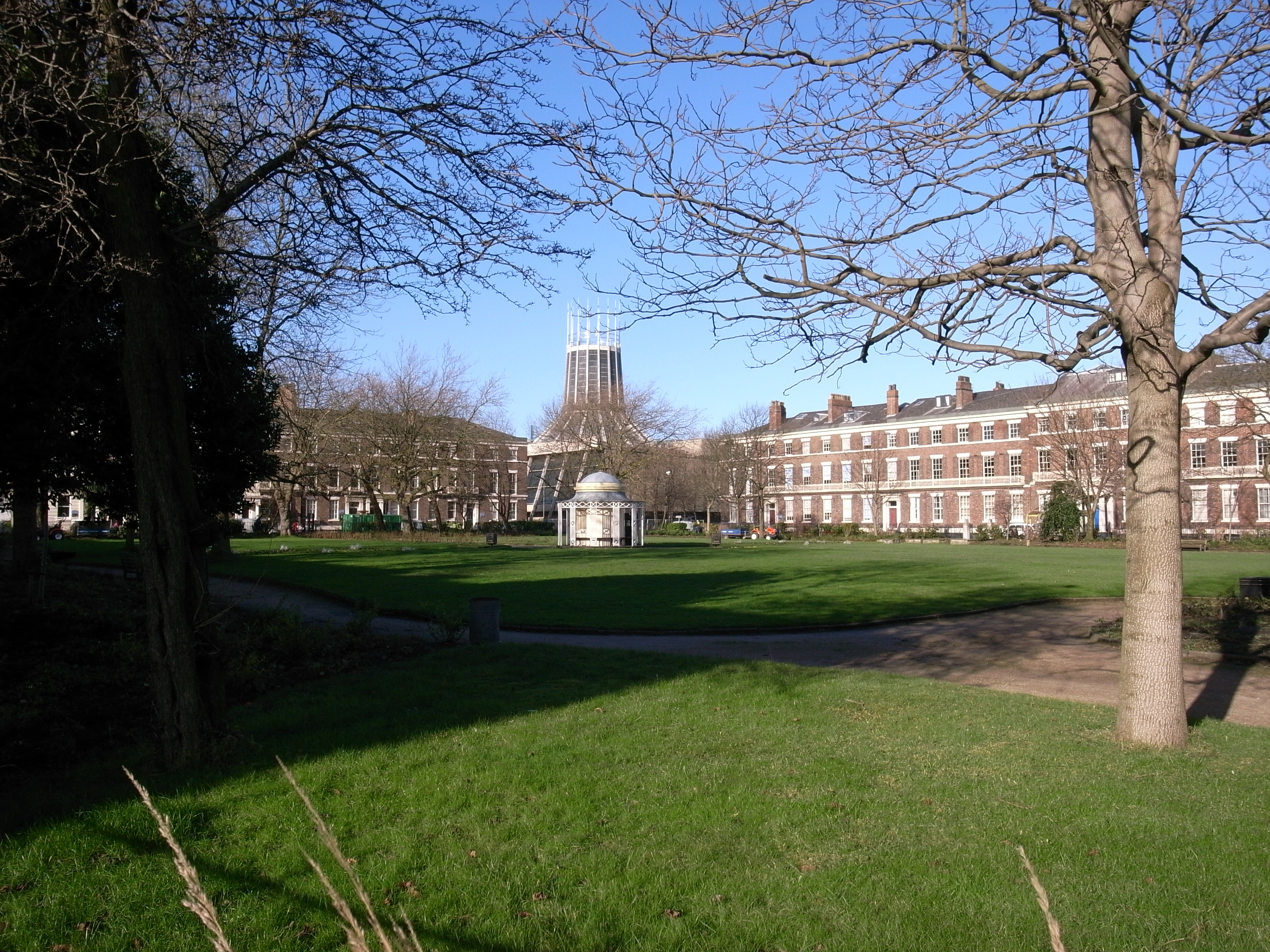
Abercromby Square

Abercromby Square is a square in the University of Liverpool, England. It is bordered by Oxford Street to the north and Cambridge Street to the south. It is named after General Sir Ralph Abercromby, commander of the British Army in Egypt, who died of his wounds following the Battle of Alexandria in 1801.

Abercromby Square Gardens occupy the centre of the square.

From 6 May to 8 July 2024, the square was occupied as part of the 2024 pro-Palestinian protests on university campuses by Students of Alareer Square who renamed it unofficially after murdered Gazan poet Refaat Alareer. The occupation lasted 65 days in total, making it the longest student demonstration in Liverpool University history.

== History ==
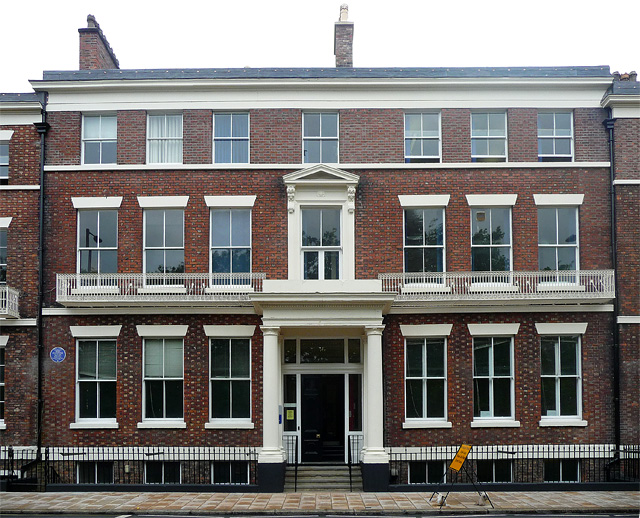
19 Abercromby Square

In 1800 John Foster Sr, Liverpool's corporate surveyor, drew up plans for a heath known as Mosslake Fields which would create a grid of buildings between Falkner Street and Brownlow Hill with a square at their centre. In 1819 he designed a terrace which would face the square, which was used for the western side. By 1830, three sides of terraced housing were completed with the fourth eastern side featuring St Catherine's Church, designed by Foster's son John Foster Jr. The church was bombed in World War II and the University of Liverpool's Senate House, built 1966–68, now occupies the site. The domed structure in the centre of the gardens was designed by Foster Sr in 1822 for storing garden tools.

In the second half of the 19th century, many of the residents of Abercromby Square were merchants with business links to the Confederate States of America. This led to the creation of a branch of the Southern Independence Association and the home of Charles K. Prioleau at 19 Abercromby Square regarded as an 'unofficial embassy' of the Confederacy. After the end of the American Civil War, former Confederate president Jefferson Davis visited Liverpool three times seeking employment, sometimes staying in Abercromby Square.

19 Abercromby Square was also home to the Chavasse family from 1900, including Francis Chavasse, Bishop of Liverpool and his twin sons Noel, who was awarded the Victoria Cross twice and Christopher, who like Noel was an Olympic athlete. A statue of Captain Noel Chavasse now stands on the corner of Abercromby Square and Oxford Street.

When William Lever, the founder of Port Sunlight, died in 1925 he left a sum of money to the university to refurbish and extend the School of Architecture on the northern terrace of the square. It was designed by Charles Reilly, Lionel Budden, and James Ernest Marshall and completed in 1933.

A Barbara Hepworth sculpture, Squares with Two Circles (1964), is located in front of Senate House having been returned in 2023 after nine years in a different location.

== See also ==
- Architecture of Liverpool
