= Kerr's Patent Revolver =

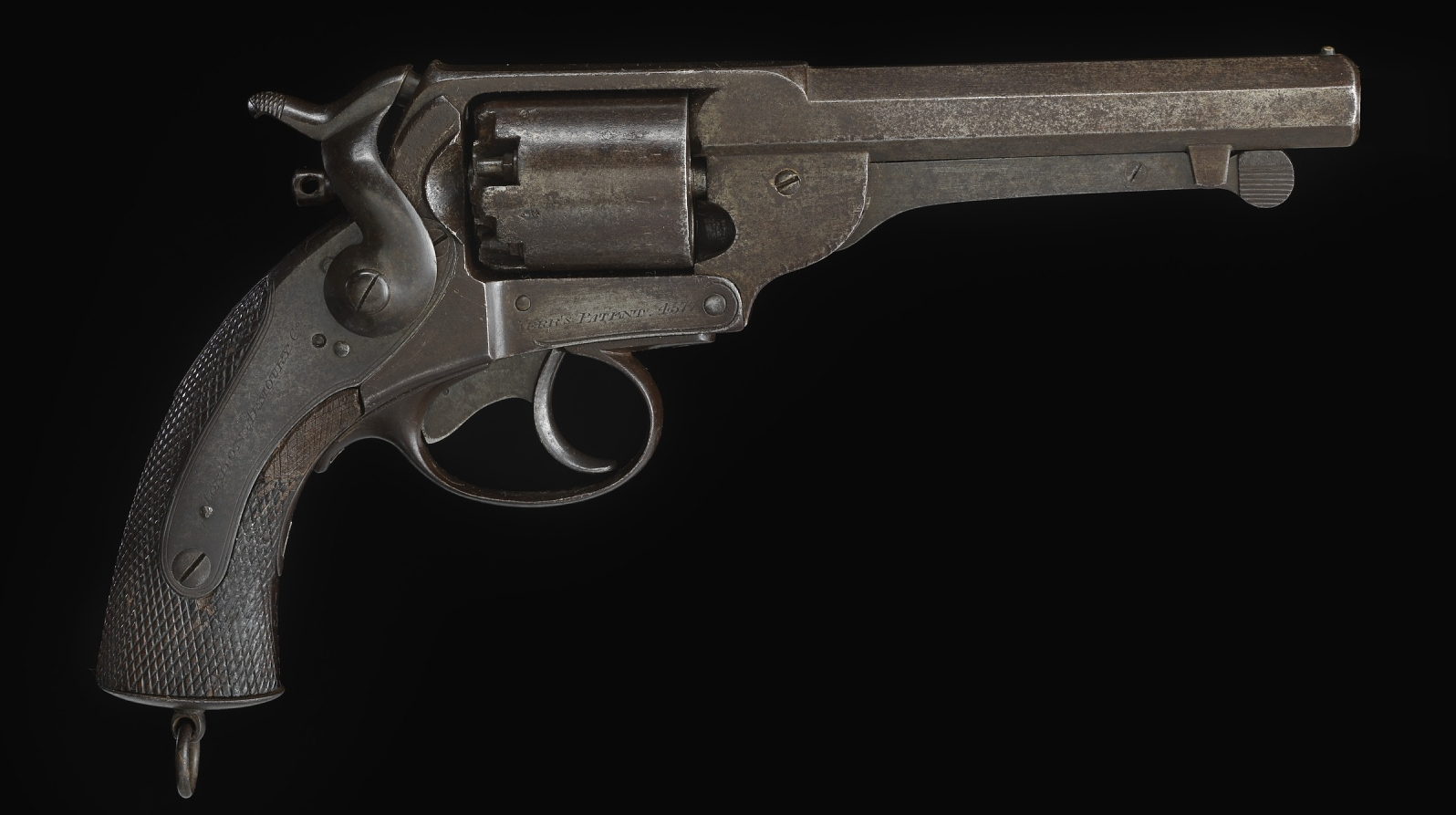
- Type: Revolver
- Place of origin: United Kingdom

Service history
- Used by: Confederate States of America, United Kingdom, Canada, Australia
- Wars: New Zealand wars, American Civil War, Australian frontier wars, Fenian raids, Red River Rebellion, Boshin War

Production history
- Designer: James Kerr
- Designed: 1855
- Manufacturer: London Armoury Company
- Unit cost: $18.00
- Produced: 1859–1866

Specifications
- Length: 12.25 in (311 mm)
- Barrel length: 5 in (130 mm)
- Caliber: .36 and .44 in (9.1 and 11.2 mm)
- Action: Single-action, cylinder rotates if trigger is pulled while hammer is down but the gun must be cocked manually in order for it to fire.
- Feed system: 5 round cylinder

Kerr's Patent Revolver was an unusual 5-shot single-action revolver manufactured from 1859 to 1866 by the London Armoury Company. It was used by Confederate cavalrymen during the U.S. Civil War. Seven of these revolvers were held by the New Zealand Colonial Defence Force in 1863. It is easily recognized by its side-mounted hammer.

== History ==
James Kerr had been the foreman for the Deane, Adams and Deane gun factory. Robert Adams, one of the partners and inventor of the Adams revolver, was Kerr's cousin. Kerr developed an improvement to the Adams revolver, British Patent No. 1722 of July 28, 1855, and when Adams left the Deane brothers to found the London Armoury Company on February 9, 1856, Kerr went with him. The London Armoury Company manufactured military rifles and revolvers. Kerr designed rifles for the company based on the 1853 pattern Enfield rifled musket. When the company directors decided to focus on rifle production in 1859 Adams left, taking his revolver patents with him.

Kerr designed a new revolver in .36 caliber and .44 caliber (54 bore in British measurement). Production began in April 1859. The British government did not initially purchase the weapon and civilian sales were modest. All the New Zealand revolvers were 54 bore(gauge) or .44 calibre.

However, the U.S. Civil War began in 1860 and the governments of both the United States and the Confederacy began purchasing arms in Britain. In November 1861, 1,600 revolvers were purchased for the Union army, at $18.00 apiece. However Confederate arms buyers Maj. Caleb Huse and Cpt. James D. Bulloch contracted for all the rifles and revolvers the Armoury could produce (and the Confederate government could pay for). As a result, the London Armoury Company became a major arms supplier to the Confederacy, selling most of the 11,000 Kerr revolvers produced to Huse. The Kerr revolvers sold to the Confederacy were said by William Edwards in his book Civil War Guns to be those between serial numbers 3,000 and 10,000, but earlier serial numbers are thought by collectors to have also been shipped to the South, and there are no good records to show the exact number sold to the Confederate buyers.

As with all Confederate imports from England (and Europe), these weapons had to pass through the Union blockade and the number that actually reached the Confederate army is unknown. Modern writers often state that the Confederates acclaimed the London Armoury Company's guns (which would include the first-class model 1853 rifle-muskets on the Enfield pattern) as the best weapons delivered to the Confederacy. The London Armoury Company supplied more revolvers to the Confederacy than the total produced by all the efforts of Southern manufacturers to make revolvers.

As the Civil War progressed, the London Armoury Company was almost completely dependent on sales to the Confederacy and survived for only a year after the end of the war, dissolving in the Spring of 1866.

== Operation ==
The Kerr Revolver featured a side-mounted hammer on a back-action lockplate. Unlike other revolvers of the day, the lock mechanism of the Kerr revolver was identical to that of back-action rifle and single shot pistol percussion locks of the time. The simple action was designed to be easily repairable in the field without requiring model-specific spare parts. The Kerr had a top strap over the cylinder, which is held in place by a pin that runs into the back of the frame below the hammer. The pistol is 12.25 inches overall with a barrel length of about 5 inches. Nearly all were made in .44, or "54 bore", caliber; a few in the smaller .36 caliber.

The Kerr is often described as a double-action revolver. That is true as to only the earliest Kerrs produced, but all the later production were of the simpler single-action mechanism. With this simpler single-action type, the hammer must be manually pulled back until it locks in the full cock position. This cocking action causes the cylinder to revolve, thus bringing a fresh chamber into line with the barrel. Once the hammer has been cocked and locked back, the user must pull the trigger to cause the hammer to fall, striking the percussion cap over the chamber and firing the weapon. If the hammer is left down, and the trigger is pulled back, the cylinder will revolve, but the hammer will not be cocked back, as would be the case with true double-action revolver. The term "single action" means that the pulling of the trigger has only one effect—it releases the cocked hammer. In a "double-action" revolver, the pulling of the trigger has two effects—it caused the hammer to cock back, and then as the trigger pull is continued, it releases the hammer. The double-action mechanism in the early Kerrs was more complicated to manufacture and to keep in good adjustment and repair, and was early on dropped in favor of the simpler single-action mechanism.

The London Armoury Company manufactured Kerrs have engraved on the side of the frame "KERRS PATENT.xxxx" with the xxxx representing a number. This is the serial number of the gun, and not the patent number. This serial number is also on the side of the cylinder. Mistaking this serial number for a patent number is an error often repeated from Edwards,Civil War Guns, by many writers. This same serial numbering convention used on the Kerr was used on the Adams Revolver (made by the London Armoury Company, among others), and also is seen on Samuel Colt's percussion revolvers of all models, where the serial number of each revolver (stamped on various places on the Colt revolver) was stamped on the cylinder following the words "COLTS PATENT No. " On the Kerr Revolvers, as with the Adams and Colts, these numbers are sequential and are serial numbers and not the patent number.

== Bibliography ==
- Albaugh, William A., III, Benet, Hugh, Jr., and Simmons, Edward N. Confederate Handguns. Broadfoot Publishing Company, 1993.
- Edwards, William. Civil War Guns. Book Sales, 1985.
