= Charles K. Prioleau =

American cotton merchant (1827–1887)

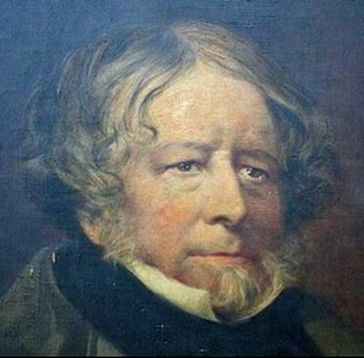
- Born: 1827; Charleston, South Carolina, U.S.
- Died: August 3, 1887 (aged 59–60); London, England
- Occupations: Cotton merchant, Senior partner of Fraser, Trenholm & Company
- Known for: Financier and supplier for the Confederacy during the American Civil War

Charles Kuhn Prioleau (1827 – August 3, 1887) was an American cotton merchant who became the senior partner of Fraser, Trenholm & Company in Liverpool, England, a firm that functioned as the European banker of the Confederacy and was its major supplier for arms and military ware during the American Civil War. As a firm that frequently acted as the European banker of the Confederacy it often extended it credit, and was sometimes referred to as "the Confederate Embassy in England".

== Early life and family ==
Prioleau was born in Charleston, South Carolina, the fourth of five children of Samuel Prioleau, a prominent judge in Charleston, South Carolina. He served with distinction with the U.S. Army during the Mexican War, and again in 1854 at age 27.

When in Liverpool, he married Mary-Elizabeth Hardman (née Wright), widely known as the "Belle of Liverpool". They rented the Palladian mansion Allerton Hall, previously owned by his wife's slave-trading ancestor, John Hardman. In early 1862, Prioleau hired an architect and built a large town house at 19 Abercromby Square, Liverpool, incorporating many of South Carolina's classic architectural styles.

== American Civil War ==
When the Civil War broke out the south had very little manufacturing potential and subsequently was in desperate need of arms, military ordnance and other supplies which it could not acquire from the industrialized north, now an enemy of the Confederate States. The Confederacy also lacked a navy in which to counter the Union blockade. Subsequently the Confederates looked to foreign sources to meet their enormous military needs, and turned to two firms in England who were already selling arms to a number of different countries.

== Supplying the Confederacy ==
Shortly after the war broke out, Charleston businessmen took advantage of the divided nation and appointed a four-man committee to oversee the creation of a steamship line that went from Charleston to Liverpool. Its members included Charles Gourdin, a prominent banker from Charleston, and Charles Prioleau, a prominent member of Charleston's largest shipping firm, John Fraser and Company. The company was chosen by the committee as its agents. The company was well known in Europe, and George Alfred Trenholm was among the wealthiest and most influential men in the South. The firm had offices in New York, Charleston and Liverpool, with a solid business reputation allowing him to obtain unlimited credit in Europe.

Prioleau arrived in Britain in 1854, and by 1863 had become a naturalized citizen, allowing him to remain in Britain to keep abreast of Confederacy business and its developments, while also monitoring important shipping arrivals and departures. His firm made their headquarters at 10 Rumford Place in Liverpool, England. The Confederacy deposited large amounts of funds with Prioleau's company with which the firm arranged for and financed the purchase of arms, ammunition, ships and other supplies for the Confederate war effort. Prioleau devised a plan to test the Union blockade using a blockade runner, the Bermuda, to run the blockade, carrying a valuable cargo of shoes, blankets, drugs, and other wares into a Confederate port and then returning with a load of cotton. He got cooperation from Confederate shipping agents who were given a share of the cargo space aboard for their own purposes, while being observed by Union agents who legally were unable to arrest the operation. On September 18, 1861, the Bermuda managed to run the blockade into Savannah, Georgia, and then again when it returned to England with a load of cotton. The success of the operation created great excitement, as the completed voyage suggested that the Confederacy's embargo on cotton was off and that the U.S. blockade was ineffectual, while Prioleau had made a fortune by his blockade run on the Bermuda. In England Prioleau worked with fellow American James Dunwoody Bulloch, (Note: Before the Civil War Bulloch served in the U.S. navy for 15 years.) a Confederate naval officer, acting as Confederate foreign agents in England. As the resident partner of Fraser, Trenholm and Company, aware of Bulloch's situation and the need for prompt action, Prioleau graciously received him and extended his trust. Though his firm had not yet received any funds on Bulloch's behalf, he nonetheless directed Bulloch to place any orders that were pressing and offered the services of his company to make financial arrangements. Prioleau also assumed the financial responsibility of a large order of arms Major Caleb Huse had made, who was also limited on existing funds. Trenholm had developed a fraternal relationship with the Confederacy, and to affirm the relationship, the Company built the gunboat, the Alexandra, using its own funds, and offered it as a gift to the Confederacy. George Trenholm, senior director of Trenholm, Fraser & Company, would also become Confederate Secretary of the Treasury in July, 1864, replacing Christopher Memminger.

From 1862 to 1865, he corresponded with many leading Confederates, often involving the prospect of blockade running. (Note: Prioleau made copies of these letters which are now housed in one of the National Museumsin Liverpool.) Prioleau soon became the master planner in the management of Confederate interests in England. His central role subsequently resulted in all the banking of the Confederacy in Europe to instead operate from Liverpool. Prioleau worked with Confederate Navy purchasing agents, while his firm also helped purchase and outfit over sixty five ships which were soon engaged in blockade running and smuggling goods to the south. While in England, Prioleau purchased a modern rifled cannon and had it directly sent to General Beauregard to be used in Charleston against Fort Sumter, on April 12, 1861. (Note: The cannon model name was the Galena Blakely, purchased from George Forrester & Company in Vauxhall.)

Through private purchasing agents, Prioleau acquired three privateers that were active during the war and which became among the most notorious Confederate vessels in service: the CSS Alabama, CSS Florida, and the CSS Shenandoah.

== Later life ==
Not eligible for amnesty in the United States, Prioleau moved with his family to Belgium, and then France, where he worked as a banker. Later he returned to London and by 1871 was living at 47 Queens Gate Gardens, the census for that year describing him as "general merchant". He is listed at this address 1871-1876, but does not appear in any London directory after that, although the notice of death in The Times of 4 August, 1887, still describes him as “of 47 Queen's-gate-gardens". He died at the age of sixty at Bailey's Hotel, where he may have been resident, and was buried in Kensal Green Cemetery. His grave was discovered in 1984 by members of the American Civil War Round Table (United Kingdom).

== See also ==
- S. Isaac, Campbell & Company, merchants who also supplied the Confederacy
- United Kingdom and the American Civil War

== Bibliography ==
- Bulloch, James Dunwoody (1884). The secret service of the Confederate States in Europe, or, How the Confederate cruisers were equipped. Vol. 1. New York : G.P. Putnam's Sons.
- Bulloch, James Dunwoody (1884). The secret service of the Confederate States in Europe, or, How the Confederate cruisers were equipped. Vol. 2. New York : G.P. Putnam's Sons.
- Douglas, Stewart (2005). "Charles Kuhn Prioleau, The Man who Bankrolled the Confederacy". American Civil War Society (UK).
- Edwards, William B. (1962). Civil War Guns. The Stackpole Company.
- Loy, Wesley (October 1997). "10 Rumford Place: Doing Confederate Business in Liverpool". The South Carolina Historical Magazine. 98 (4). South Carolina Historical Society: 349–374. JSTOR 27570268.
- Merli, Frank J. (2004) [1965]. Great Britain and the Confederate Navy, 1861-1865. Indiana University Press. ISBN 978-0-2532-17356.
- Maev Kennedy (10 August 2009). "Grave found of man who bankrolled Confederates in American civil war". The Guardian. New York, New York.
- Wise, Stephen (1991). Lifeline of the Confederacy: Blockade Running During the Civil War. University of South Carolina Press. ISBN 978-0-8724-97993. Borrow book at: archive.org
- "Liverpool and the American Civil War". National Museums Liverpool. 2021.
- "Charles K. Prioleau". 290 Foundation.
