= S. Isaac, Campbell & Company =

19th-century British arms manufacturer

S. Isaac, Campbell & Company in London started out as a boot manufacturer for the British military and later became one of the largest suppliers of arms and military wares to the Confederacy during most of the American Civil War. Before the war the firm handled large contracts for the British military, but after a corruption scandal it lost its privilege of doing any sort of business with the British government. The company then turned to supplying British militia, and then to the desperate Confederacy, which quickly became their largest customer. Confederate business and purchases of arms in Britain was conducted mostly by Confederate Major Caleb Huse, and his associate Major James Bulloch who acted as chief purchasing agents and diplomats for the Confederacy. Ultimately, it was the Confederacy's enormous debt to Isaac, Campbell & Company that was the primary cause of the company's ruin.

== Early years ==
In 1838 Samuel Isaac had established himself as a merchant that sold various military uniforms, belts and knapsacks for use by soldiers and sailors. In little time he had opened up a large and prestigious store in Chatham, Kent. By 1845 he had founded S. Isaac, Campbell & Company under the title of "Samuel Isaac, Military Contractor & Tailor", a leather and clothing goods company located in Chatham at 71 High Street. Originally the firm found success and established its name in the boot making business before expanding its operations to other supplies. By 1848 the company grew its second office in London at 21 St. James Street, using the firm's new title of "Isaac Samuel, Army Contractor" while the firm grew rapidly by selling more military supplies. In 1851 the firm again changed its name to "Samuel Isaac & Company" and one year later to "S. Isaac, Campbell & Company". The firm at this time operated in Chatham, until mid-1861 when they moved their main location in London to 71 Jermyn Street right after the outbreak of Civil War in America. (Note: Many collectors are familiar with this address as it can be found inscribed on various military items once sold to the Confederacy through the Isaac company.) The firm grew quickly by filling big contracts for the British military, which included a contract to supply uniforms to the entire British Army in the East. In May 1858 the firm acquired a large contract to supply boots to the British Army. In June 1858, however, a corruption scandal charging the firm with bribery and malfeasance, involving selling inferior goods to the military, ended up with the firm barred from doing further business with the British military. In the face of such business loss the firm turned to selling supplies to British Volunteer Corps (Note: Used for home defense in the event of invasion, during the French Revolutionary and Napoleonic Wars. See British Volunteer Corps) which did not have to meet the rigid military standards imposed by the British Government, nor be subject to their strict inspections.

== American Civil War ==
When the American Civil War broke out, the Confederacy with its limited manufacturing capacity was in dire need of arms and other military supplies and looked to foreign sources who could provide them, mostly in England. Three days after Jefferson Davis had been inaugurated President of the Confederacy on February 18, 1861, he directed Josiah Gorgas, chief of the newly established Ordnance Bureau of the Confederate States War Department, and had Commander Raphael Semmes dispatched north to the Union States in a mostly futile attermpt to purchase arms. Gordon also dispatched Major Caleb Huse (Note: Huse was a West Point Graduate, the 7th in the class of 1851, who served in the U.S. artillery. Shortly after joining the Confederacy he was commissioned a Major, on April 12, 1861, the same day Fort Sumter was first fired upon.) to Europe as the head purchasing agent for the Confederacy for purposes of procuring and shipping arms, munitions and other needed supplies for the Confederacy war effort.

=== Supplying the Confederacy ===
Only days after the attack on Fort Sumter Confederate Treasury Secretary Christopher Memminger had called on George Trenholm of John Fraser and Company in Liverpool, England, who were also bankers through whom the Confederacy would soon do a large volume of purchasing. They had made an earlier offer for a £5,000 letter of credit for Major Huse when he arrived there. The outbreak of war came right at the time when the cotton reserves accumulated in 1860 and 1861 were exhausted, with no prospect of getting further quantities from the South. The situation immediately got the attention of Isaac Campbell & Company and John Fraser and Company in Britain, along with merchants and bankers throughout much of Europe.

Major Josiah Gorgas sent Captain Caleb Huse to England with general orders to purchase 12,000 Pattern 1853 Enfield rifles with no specific instructions, to ultimately arrange for large purchases of arms, and was given wide discretionary powers to make such purchases and have them shipped back to the Confederacy. On May 10, 1861, Huse arrived in Liverpool and moved directly to London where he took residence at 58 Jermyn Street, a favorite hotel for visiting Americans called Morley's, in Trafalgar Square, conveniently located just across the street from the offices of S. Isaac, Campbell & Company which had recently opened. (Note: Huse had also consulted with the well known arms manufacture, Sinclair, Hamilton and Company.)

Huse initially contacted the S. Isaac, Campbell & Company and the London Armoury Company in search for Enfield and other comparable weapons. As an officer of the Confederacy and chief purchasing agent in England, Huse represented the Confederacy War Department and Ordnance Bureau. Working without any staff he was under considerable pressure to quickly procure military goods and arrange for shipping back to the various neutral ports off the American coast. From there the goods would be loaded on to blockade runners which would attempt to run the Union blockade into a southern port. At the time there was considerable demand for the quality rifles that Britain was producing and, given the war effort, the costs were subsequently higher, while the competition with other arms buyers was considerable. Upon his arrival Huse (Note: Shortly thereafter Bulloch, former commander in the U.S. Navy, arrived in Liverpool, as a secret agent in charge of Confederate Naval operations in England.) had comparatively little money to compete against the northern agents who had also hurried to Britain to purchase large quantities of arms and ordnance.

Funding for Huse was arranged with Fraser, Trenholm and Company allowing him to immediately begin searching the English market for Enfield rifles, a weapon whose performance equaled that of the Springfield rifle. However, the market was flooded as the demand was great for this highly acclaimed rifle, and for munitions in general. Seeking assistance in this foreign environment Huse sought out purchasing houses and financiers like Sinclair, Hamilton and Company and S. Isaac, Campbell & Company, At the time Huse was unaware that the firm was recently involved in a scandal, involving over-charging the British military for inferior goods during the Crimean War.

Concerned over Huse's initial reports and his northern background, Jefferson Davis and Confederate Secretary of War Leroy Walker sent Major Edward C. Anderson to Liverpool to look in on Huse's activity, giving him complete authority over affairs, or to replace Huse should he deem it necessary. (Note: Anderson had served as an officer in the U.S. Navy and was a friend of Jefferson Davis.) Arriving in Queenstown June 22, 1861 aboard the Camilla he traveled to Liverpool directly to meet with Huse and Bulloch. Walker immediately ascertained that both men were conducting business with complete competence and loyalty, and as instructed, gave them all the assistance he could offer.

=== Arms suppliers ===
Operating as commission merchants, the S. Isaac, Campbell & Company connected Huse with arms suppliers, arranged for financing, and credit through Trenholm (Note: Trenholm later became Secretary of the Confederate Treasury (July 18, 1864 – April 27, 1865)) while charging a commission fee from both parties. S. Isaac, Campbell & Co. quickly became an important supplier of great quantities of arms, munitions and ordnance for the Confederacy, while also supplying badly needed leather, cloth and uniforms. The firm also arranged for the shipping, by way of specially built fast cruising blockade runners. Huse ultimately depended on the firm to proceed with his efforts in a timely fashion and subsequently quickly became the firm's best customer. By February 1863, Huse had managed to purchase over a million pounds in supplies, arranged by S. Isaac, Campbell & Company, which included £417,262 in small arms, £110,525 in uniforms and other clothing, and £54,973 in military and other accouterments. This activity did not go completely unnoticed by Union secret agents in Britain, like William M. Walker, U.S.N., who reported to his chief, Secretary of State, William H. Seward. Through the assistance of such firms the Confederacy at no time during the war was lacking in arms and tools for conducting battle.

S. Isacc, Campbell Company along with Major Huse had spent their own capital for supplies which they promptly shipped to the Confederacy with the expectation they would be compensated at a later date. Huse had spent more than $5,000,000 (~$122 million in 2024) on supplies by the end of 1862. Between January 20 and March 7, 1862, $1,261,600 (~$30.8 million in 2024) had been sent to Major Caleb, along with significant amounts before and after this time. In November 1862, however, $2,000,000 (~$48.8 million in 2024) was still owed to S. Isacc, Campbell Company by the Confederacy.

=== Banished by the Confederacy ===
Concerns were raised when it was learned that Huse had been taken in by the S. Isaac, Campbell & Company which was secretly keeping a double set of books; one used to recording the real price, while the other listed the price quoted to the Confederacy. When confronted over the issue the firm took the position that this was the only way it could protect itself against loss. Despite his good record with the Confederacy, the affair left Huse in a precarious position. An investigation headed by Colin J. McRae, the Confederate States Financial Agent in Britain, cleared Huse of any allegations, however, he ended all Confederacy relations with S. Isaac, Campbell & Company whom he suspected of intentionally over charging the Confederacy by substituting inferior arms.

== Final business ==
Even though the Confederacy had "officially" ended their relationship with firm by mid-1863, the Isaac brothers still managed to sell various wares to the south during 1864 through the use of front men who offered items made by Isaac's factories. With the Confederate defeat at the end of the war, the company soon began to deteriorate, with many outstanding debts still owed to the south and trouble with the Erlanger loan. (Note: S. Isaac, Campbell & Co. was one of the key beneficiaries of the Confederate loan.) In April and May 1863 the Confederates sold £220,000 of cotton bonds at approximately 91%, bringing in £199,340. In late May, £150,000 in Erlanger bonds were used by the Confederacy to settle part of a debt incurred by Caleb Huse and Saul Isaac, Campbell and Company. This firm received the bonds at the issue price of 90% and canceled a debt of £135,000. However, in July 1863, with General Grant's victory and the surrender of Vicksburg, the Confederacy was cut off from the Mississippi River and access to its cotton plantations, causing the value of cotton securities to fall drastically. (Note: Grant's victory caused a 30 percent drop in their value overnight.) This subsequently ruined the firm, damaging its holdings, credit, making future business prospects unlikely, and ultimately forcing the firm into declaring bankruptcy in 1869. The Confederate States of America, the firm's most valuable customer, ended up crippling the Isaac firm financially. By war's end, 60% of the cotton produced in the south during the war had gone to Britain.

== See also ==
- Blockade runners of the American Civil War
- Charles K. Prioleau, financier for the Confederacy in England
- London Armoury Company, major arms suppliers for the Confederate military
- United Kingdom and the American Civil War
- Cotton diplomacy

== Bibliography ==
- Bulloch, James Dunwoody (1884). The secret service of the Confederate States in Europe, or, How the Confederate cruisers were equipped. Vol. 1. New York : G.P. Putnam's Sons.
- Bulloch, James Dunwoody (1884). The secret service of the Confederate States in Europe, or, How the Confederate cruisers were equipped. Vol. 2. New York : G.P. Putnam's Sons.
- —— (2021). "S. Isaac, Campbell & Company, (Essay based on author's book)". College Hill Arsenal.
- Collins, Steven G. (July 1999). "System in the South: John W. Mallet, Josiah Gorgas, and Uniform Production at the Confederate Ordnance Department". Technology and Culture. 40 (3). The Johns Hopkins University Press and the Society for the History of Technology: 517–544. doi:10.1353/tech.1999.0146. JSTOR 25147358. S2CID 108478012.
- Gentry, Judith Fenner (May 1970). "A Confederate Success in Europe: The Erlanger Loan". The Journal of Southern History. 38 (2). Southern Historical Association: 157–188. doi:10.2307/2205869. JSTOR 2205869.
- Huse, Caleb (1904). The supplies for the Confederate Army : how they were obtained in Europe and how paid for. Boston : Press of T. R. Marvin & son.
- Loy, Wesley (October 1997). "10 Rumford Place: Doing Confederate Business in Liverpool". The South Carolina Historical Magazine. 98 (4). South Carolina Historical Society: 349–374. JSTOR 27570268.
- McKenna, Joseph (2019). British Blockade Runners in the American Civil War. McFarland, Incorporated, Publishers. ISBN 978-1-4766-76791.
- Mendelsohn, Adam (2012). "Samuel and Saul Isaac: International Jewish Arms Dealers, Blockade Runners, and Civil War Profiteers" (PDF). Journal of the Southern Jewish Historical Society. 15. Southern Jewish Historical Society: 41–79.
- Owsley, Frank Lawrence (1959). King Cotton diplomacy : foreign relations of the Confederate States of America. Chicago : University of Chicago Press. ISBN 978-0-2266-42215.
- Ross, Charles D. (2020). Breaking the Blockade, The Bahamas During the Civil War. University Press of Mississippi. ISBN 978-1-4968-31347.
- Scharf, J. Thomas (1887). History of the Confederate States Navy. New York: Rogers & Sherwood.
- Sexton, Jay (2005). Debtor Diplomacy: Finance and American Foreign Relations in the Civil War. Oxford university Press. ISBN 978-0-1992-81039.
- Vandiver, Frank E. (March 1944). "A Sketch of Efforts Abroad to equip the Confederate Armory at Macon". The Georgia Historical Quarterly. 28 (1). Georgia Historical Society: 34–40. JSTOR 40576915.
- Vandiver, Frank E. (May 1951). "Makeshifts of Confederate Ordnance". The Journal of Southern History. 17 (2). Southern Historical Association: 180–193. doi:10.2307/2198263. JSTOR 2198263.
- Wilson, Walter E.; McKay, Gary L. (2012). James D. Bulloch: Secret Agent and Mastermind of the Confederate Navy. McFarland, North Carolina. ISBN 978-0-7864-66597.
- Wise, Stephen (1991). Lifeline of the Confederacy: Blockade Running During the Civil War. University of South Carolina Press. ISBN 978-0-8724-97993. Borrow book at: archive.org
