= Samuel Isaac =

Samuel Isaac (1812 – 22 November 1886) was a merchant whose firm, S. Isaac, Campbell & Company, supplied military uniforms and arms, and was also a promoter of the Mersey Railway Tunnel.

== Early life ==
Isaac was the son of Lewis Isaacs of Chatham, Kent, by Catherine, daughter of N. Solomon of Margate, and was born at Chatham in 1815. His father, who used the name Isaacs, was in partnership with Thomas Ponder as army and navy clothiers and outfitters at Chatham until 1835.

By 1838, Samuel Isaac had established himself as a supplier of boots, military uniforms, belts, and knapsacks for soldiers and sailors, with a store in Chatham. By 1845 he was trading as "Samuel Isaac, Military Contractor & Tailor", in Chatham High Street. Moving on to Westminster, by 1848 the company was at 21 St James's Street, under the name of "Isaac Samuel, Army Contractor", and later was in Jermyn Street, trading as S. Isaac, Campbell & Company. His brother, Saul Isaac, J. P., afterwards a member of parliament for Nottingham 1874–80, was his business partner.

== Confederate war ==
During the American Civil War (1861–1865), the Isaac firm was the largest European supporter of the southern states. Its ships, outward bound with military stores and freighted home with cotton, were the most enterprising of blockade-runners all through the war. Isaac's son Henry, who died at Nassau, West Indies, during the war, had much to do with this branch of the business. Having raised a regiment of volunteers from among the workmen of his own factory at Northampton, Isaac was rewarded with the military rank of major. He and his firm were large holders of Confederate funds and consequently had huge losses on the conclusion of the American war in 1865.

== Mersey railway tunnel ==
In 1880 he acquired the rights of the promoters of the Mersey Railway Tunnel, and himself undertook the making of the tunnel, letting the works to Messrs. Waddell, and employing as engineers Mr. James Brunlees and Sir Douglas Fox. H. C. Raikes became chairman of the company formed to carry through the undertaking, with Edward Pleydell-Bouverie as vice-chairman. Money was raised, and the boring was completed under Isaac's superintendence on 17 January 1884. The tunnel was opened on 13 February 1885; the first passenger train ran through on 22 December; it was formally opened by the future King Edward VII, when he was Prince of Wales, on 20 January 1886. Queen Victoria accepted from Isaac a jewelled representation of the tunnel, in which the speck of light at the end of it was represented by a brilliant.

== Personal life ==
At the 1841 census, Isaac was recorded in High Street, Chatham, with his wife Isabella and young son Samuel, and was described as an Outfitter. At the census of 1851, he was living in Onslow Square, South Kensington, with a fourteen-year-old son, Samuel E. H. Isaac, both born in Chatham, a groom, a housemaid, and a cook, and was described as a “General Merchant”. Isabella Isaac died in 1858. The 1861 census finds Isaac still in Onslow Square, with a new wife, Emma Isaac, and with five children aged between nine and 25, the three oldest, Harry, Phebe, and Michael, born in Chatham. They have five servants. The eldest son, Samuel Edward Henry Isaac, died of yellow fever in Nassau, Bahamas, in 1862.

Isaac was an art collector, and by the 1880s his collection included some of the best works of Benjamin Williams Leader R.A.

Isaac died on 22 November 1886 at 29 Warrington Crescent, Maida Vale, London, leaving to his heirs the huge fortune of £203,084 17s. 9d (equivalent to £22,822,049 in 2025). His executors were his brother Saul Isaac of Hyde Park Mansions and his nephew Louis Solomon of Liverpool. He was buried at the Willesden United Synagogue Cemetery.
