= Patrick Huse =

Norwegian artist (born 1948)

Patrick Huse (born April 1, 1948) is a Norwegian painter and multimedia artist.

== Early life and career ==
He studied landscape art and conceptualism during the late 1970s and early 1980s. His works incorporate techniques as painting, drawing, photograph, video, wall based text material and objects. His work is described by Matthew Kangas, Seattle’s leading critic for thirty years, interprets Patrick Huse’s art in the light of this narrative when he gave a great deal of praise in the Seattle Times about “Rift” in the Frye Art Museum, 2000: “Dark, cloudy and moody, Huse's pictures are part of a long, gloomy tradition of northern European landscape tradition. In the early 1990s he started a project titled Rethinking Landscape, trilogy consisting of the three parts: 1 Nordic Landscape, 2 RIFT and 3 Penetration. The traditional landscape art still plays a role as an artistic reference, but through a series of exhibitions from the mid-1990s and later, he has challenged landscape art in a way which makes his project unique. For many years through his interest for indigenous people and tradition in the Arctic Patrick Huse extensively travelled the north and his work in a period of twelve years resulted in an approach to art through a crossover between art and anthropology. This was concluded in a trilogy called Northern Imaginary which was under production for nine years.

Patrick Huse has worked extensively with larger pedagogical museum art projects connected to Northern issues for many years. Produced books connected to the different projects. Social research in Arctic Canada, Greenland, Iceland and the Nordic countries and cooperated with a large number of academics from several universities. The books are used as text books in academic courses in universities and university colleges.

In his entire body of work, Patrick Huse argues the use of elements taken from nature and culture in the northern areas becomes an invitation to associate with working on the relationship – center and periphery, one of the most repeated topics for structuring the geographical relationship between north and south. The choice of geographical location forces the artist and viewer to relate to places where the basis of existence is so meager that existence itself is stretched to its limits. One can claim that there is a desire to place oneself in a type of challenge which one does not go through unchanged and addresses a freedom of speech in contradiction to any ideology.

== Gallery ==
- Title: Discharge and Fermentation, Oil on canvas, 201x382 cm, 1998–2008, Pori Art Museum, Finland, Patrick Huse
- Title: Landscape Flow, Technique: Oil on canvas, 190 x 190 cm, Reykjavik Art Museum, Iceland
- Title: Fragile Painting / 2010, Technique: Oil on canvas, 75 x 90 cm / 30 x 36 inches, Lillerhammer Art Museum, Norway
- Title: Landscape Flow Iceland, 2005, Technique: Oil on canvas / Photo, 180 x 540 cm / 72 x 280 inches, Patrick Huse, National Museum of Art, Norway
- Title: Technique: Oil on canvas / Photo, Size: 180 x 540 cm / 72 x 280 inches, Sparebankstiftelsen DNB Nor, Norway
