= France and the American Civil War =

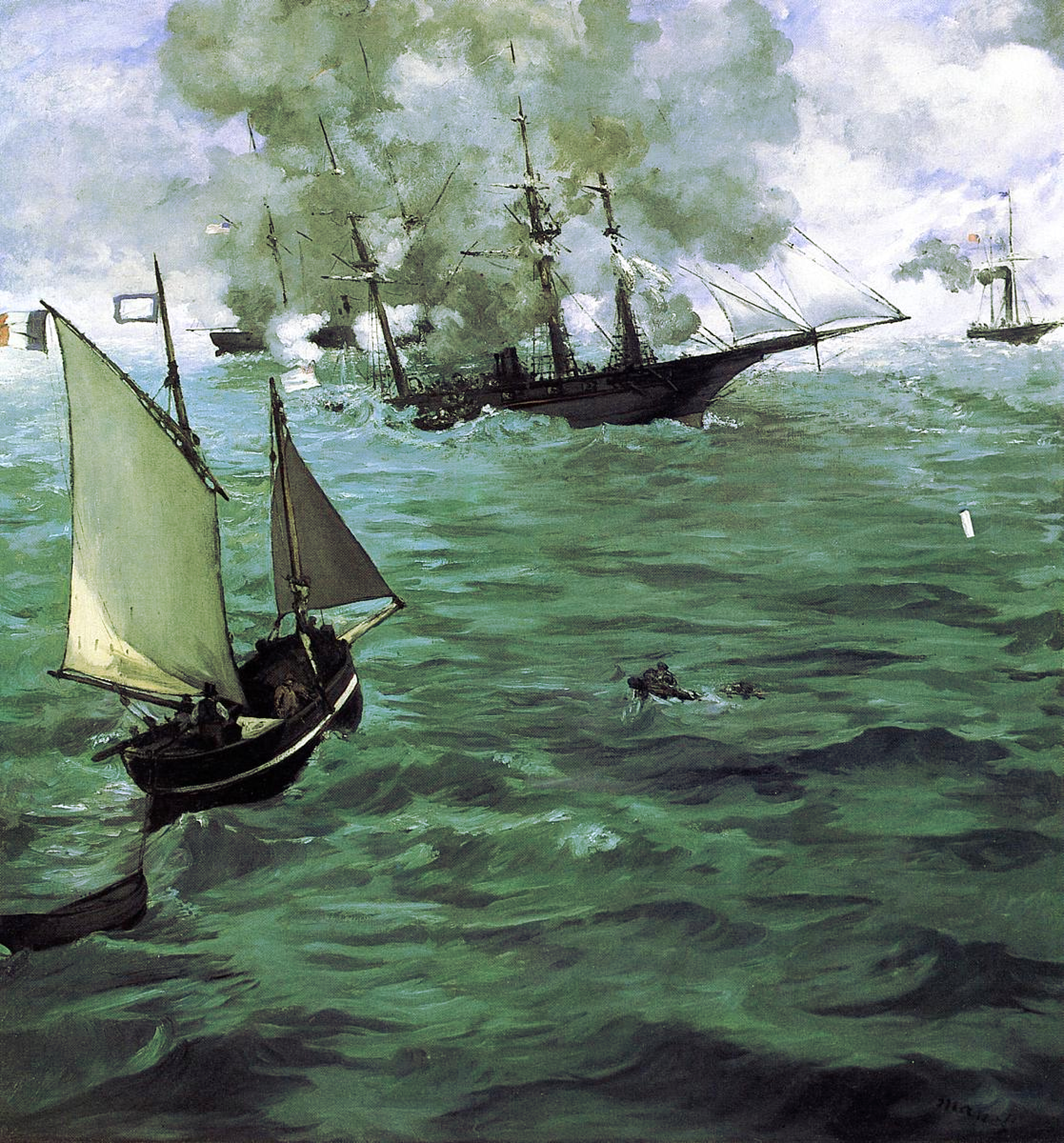
The Battle of the Kearsarge and the Alabama, by Édouard Manet, depicting the Union victory at the Battle of Cherbourg (1864)

The Second French Empire remained officially neutral throughout the American Civil War and never recognized the Confederate States of America. The United States warned that recognition would mean war. France was reluctant to act without British collaboration, and the British government rejected intervention.

Emperor Napoleon III realized that a war with the United States without allies "would spell disaster" for France. However, the textile industry used cotton, and Napoleon had sent an army to control Mexico, which could be greatly aided by the Confederacy. At the same time, other French political leaders, such as Foreign Minister Édouard Thouvenel, supported the United States.

== Public opinion and economics ==
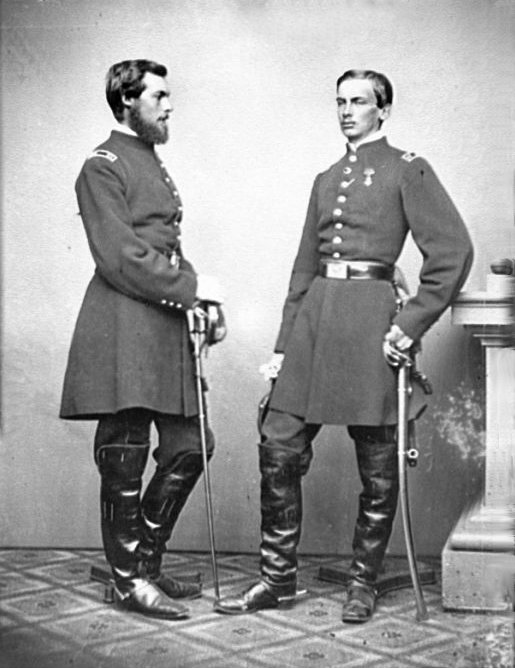
Philippe and his brother Robert d'Orléans served as officers for the Union.

The 22 political newspapers in Paris reflected the range of French public opinion. Their position on the war was determined by their political values regarding democracy, Napoleon III, and their prediction of the ultimate outcome. Issues such as slavery; the Trent affair, which involved Britain; and the economic impact on the French cotton industry did not influence the editors. Their positions on the war determined their responses to such issues. The Confederacy was supported by the conservative supporters of Napoleon III, Legitimists loyal to the House of Bourbon, and Roman Catholic leaders. The Union had the support of Republicans and Orléanists (those who wanted a descendant of Louis Philippe I and the House of Orléans on the throne).

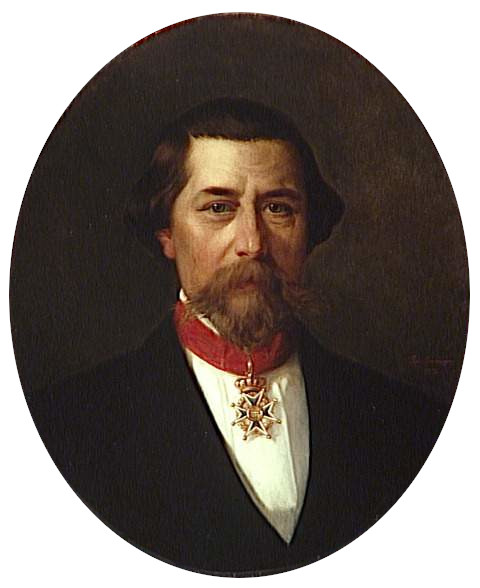
Pierre-Paul Pecquet du Bellet, unofficial diplomatic agent of the Confederate States of America in France

Between 1861 and 1865, the Union blockade cut off Confederate cotton supplies to French textile mills. However France had amassed a large surplus of cotton in 1861, and shortages did not occur until late 1862. By 1863 shortages caused the famine du coton (cotton famine). Mills in Alsace, Nord-Pas-de-Calais, and Normandy saw prices of cotton double by 1862 and were forced to lay off many workers. However, there were cotton imports from India and from the Union, and also government-sponsored public works projects to provide jobs for unemployed textile workers. Napoleon was eager to help the Confederacy, but his two foreign ministers were strongly opposed, as were many business interests. They recognized that trade with the Union trumped the need for Confederate cotton. The Union was the chief importer of French silk, wines, watches, pottery, and porcelain, and was an essential provider of wheat and potash to the French economy. As a result, the economic factors weighed in favor of neutrality.

== Government policy ==
The French government considered the American war a relatively minor issue while France was engaged in multiple diplomatic endeavors in Europe and around the world. Emperor Napoleon III was interested in Central America for trade and plans of a transoceanic canal. He knew that the US strongly opposed and the Confederacy tolerated his plan to create a new empire in Mexico, where his troops landed in January 1862.

Henri Mercier, the Baltimore-born French ambassador to the United States, was generally thought to lean pro-South, visiting Richmond in 1862 and proposing a common market between the southern states and France. Mercier advised the French government to be ready to establish "immediate" diplomatic ties should Confederate survival appear certain, but also wanted to protect France from retaliation after "premature recognition".

William L. Dayton, the American minister to France, met the French Foreign Minister, Édouard Thouvenel, who was pro-Union and was influential in dampening Napoleon's initial inclination towards diplomatic recognition of Confederate independence. However, Thouvenel resigned from office in 1862.

The Confederate delegate in Paris, John Slidell, was not officially received. However, he made offers to Napoleon III that in exchange for French recognition of the Confederate States and naval help sent to break the blockade, the Confederacy would sell raw cotton to France. Count Walewski and Eugène Rouher agreed with him, but British disapproval and especially the Union capture of New Orleans in the spring of 1862 led French diplomacy to oppose the plan. After the House of Commons voted against recognizing the Confederacy in March 1863, Confederate diplomatic efforts moved their focus to France, with the Union's counter-diplomacy following. In June, France extracted from Spain a plea to recognize the Confederacy if France did it first, regardless of British stance which had been a long-time Spanish concern.

In 1864, Napoleon III sent his confidant, the Philadelphian Thomas W. Evans, as an unofficial diplomat to Lincoln and US Secretary of State William H. Seward. Evans convinced Napoleon III that Southern defeat was impending. Napoleon III lost further interest due to the outbreaks of the January Uprising and the Second Schleswig War in Europe.

== Proposed armistice ==
After the Emancipation Proclamation and change in favor towards the Union among the French public, Mercier forwarded a proposed joint mediation with Great Britain and Russia to end the war, beginning with a joint armistice with the reasons being the suffering of the Southern people, the harmful economic impact of the war on Europe, particularly the cotton market, and the seeming impossibility of the two sides independently reaching a quick end to the conflict.

The Emperor stated:

My own preference is a proposition of an armistice for six months, with the Southern ports open to the commerce of the world. This would put a stop to the effusion of blood, and hostilities would probably never be resumed. We can urge it on the high grounds of humanity and the interest of the whole civilised world. If it be refused by the North, it will afford good reason for recognition, and perhaps for more active intervention.

The proposal was printed in French newspapers on 15 November 1862 after discussions with representatives of the Confederate States of America and Great Britain in October, but was angrily rejected by Secretary of State Seward. Seeing little headway being made, Mercier asked to be reassigned to Spanish relations in 1863.

== Weapons trade ==
Confederate weapons purchases moved almost exclusively to France after the Union successfully argued in court that Confederate weapons purchases were a breach of British neutrality.

Slidell succeeded in negotiating a loan of $15,000,000 from Frédéric Émile d'Erlanger and other French capitalists. The money was used to buy ironclad warships as well as military supplies that came in by blockade runners.

In keeping with its official neutrality, the French government blocked the sale of the CSS Stonewall prior to delivery to the Confederacy in February 1864 and resold the ship to the Royal Danish Navy. However, the Danes refused to accept the ship because of price disagreements with the shipbuilder, L'Arman. L'Arman subsequently secretly resold the ship by January 1865 to the Confederacy while it was still at sea.

== Aftermath ==
Near the end of the war, representatives at the 1865 Hampton Roads Conference briefly discussed a proposal for a north–south reconciliation by a joint action against the French in Mexico. In his reply to a 1866 French request for neutrality, Seward said that French withdrawal should be unconditional, and the French agreed to withdraw from Mexico by 1867. Without French armies, the puppet emperor Maximilian I of Mexico was defeated and executed by the republican government of Benito Juárez on 19 June.

== See also ==
- Diplomacy of the American Civil War
- Presidency of Abraham Lincoln
- Second French Empire
- Foreign enlistment in the American Civil War
