= Harry M. P. Huse =

American admiral

Harry McLaren Pinckney Huse
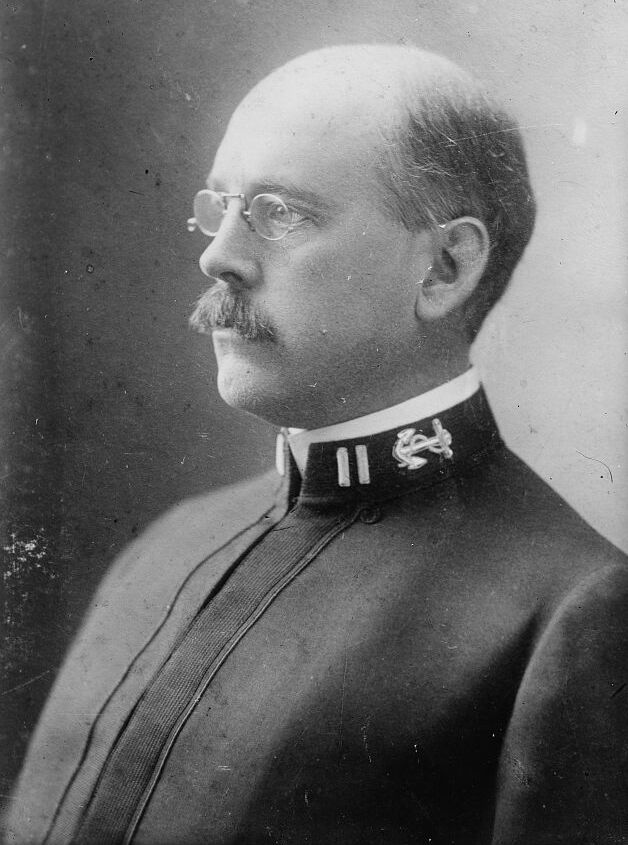
- Lt. Harry Huse, c. 1894–1901
- Born: December 8, 1858; West Point, New York, US
- Died: May 14, 1942 (aged 83); Bethesda, Maryland, US
- Burial place: Arlington National Cemetery
- Military career
- Allegiance: United States
- Branch: United States Navy
- Service years: 1878–1922
- Rank: Vice admiral
- Unit: USS Gloucester (1891)
- Commands: USS Villalobos (PG-42); USS Nevada (BM-8); USS Celtic (AF-2); USS Vermont (BB-20); Atlantic Training Fleet; U.S. Naval Forces in European Waters; Third Naval District
- Conflicts: Spanish–American War: Battle of Santiago de Cuba; U.S. occupation of Veracruz
- Awards: Medal of Honor

Harry McLaren Pinckney Huse (December 8, 1858 – May 14, 1942) was a United States Navy Vice-Admiral and a recipient of America's highest military decoration—the Medal of Honor—for his actions during the U.S. intervention at Veracruz, Mexico.

== Biography ==
Harry Huse was born at the U.S. Military Academy, West Point, New York, where his Army officer father, Caleb Huse, was then stationed. He was appointed to the U.S. Naval Academy in September 1874 and graduated in June 1878. He had extensive service at sea over the next decade, plus duty ashore, notably at the Naval Academy, where he would have several staff tours in the course of his career. During the 1898 Spanish–American War Lieutenant Huse was executive officer of the gunboat USS Gloucester (1891), taking part in the Battle of Santiago de Cuba and leading a party ashore that first raised the U.S. flag over Puerto Rico. In the early 1900s Lieutenant Commander Huse was stationed in the Philippines, where he commanded the gunboat USS Villalobos (PG-42). This was followed by nearly five years at the Naval Academy as, among other things, instructor of mathematics.

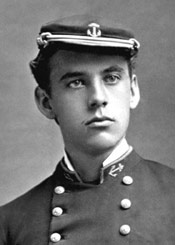
Midshipman Harry Huse, U.S. Naval Academy photo

Promoted to the rank of commander in 1907, Huse was commanding officer of the monitor USS Nevada (BM-8) and later of the supply ship USS Celtic (AF-2). After his next promotion, to captain late in 1909, he was captain of the yard at the Philadelphia Navy Yard, commanded the battleship USS Vermont (BB-20) and, in 1914–1915, was chief of staff to Rear Admiral Frank Friday Fletcher. He attended the Naval War College, graduating in 1915.

Huse reached the rank of rear admiral in mid-1916, while at the War College. He held Navy Department positions through the World War I years, followed in 1919 by command of the Atlantic Training Fleet. From late 1919 to early 1921 he served abroad, initially as senior U.S. Navy representative on the Inter-Allied Naval Armistice Commission and the Naval Inter-Allied Commission of Control, then as commander, U.S. Naval Forces in European Waters, with the temporary rank of vice admiral. After returning to the United States he was commandant of the Third Naval District, headquartered at New York City, and as a member of the Navy's General Board. Rear Admiral Huse left active duty in December 1922, later receiving the retirement rank of vice admiral.

Huse was a Washington, D.C., resident for the rest of his life. He co-authored a book on genealogy entitled The Descendants of Abel Huse of Newbury (1602–1690), published in 1935. Harry Huse died at Bethesda Naval Hospital, in suburban Maryland, on May 14, 1942. He is buried with his wife, Mary Sheward Whitelock, at Arlington National Cemetery, Arlington County, Virginia.

== Medal of Honor citation ==
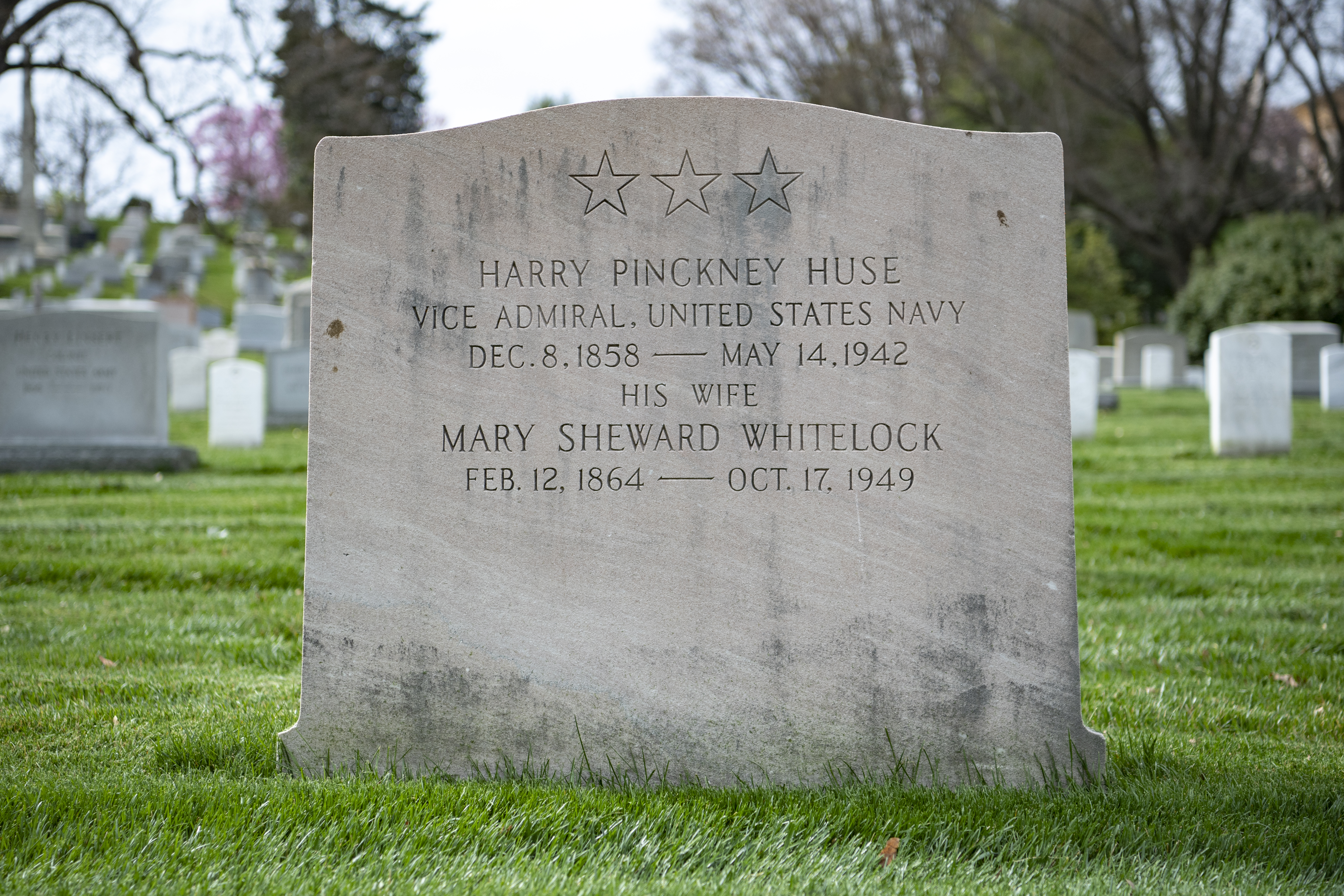
Grave at Arlington National Cemetery

As a result of his conduct during the landings at Vera Cruz, Mexico, in April 1914, Captain Huse was awarded the Medal of Honor. His official Medal of Honor citation reads: His first name was given as Henry on the citation.

Citation:

For distinguished conduct in battle, engagements of Vera Cruz, 21 and 22 April 1914. Under fire, Captain Huse was eminent and conspicuous in the performance of his duties; was indefatigable in his labors of a most important character, both with the division commander in directing affairs and in his efforts on shore to get in communication with the Mexican authorities to avoid needlessly prolonging the conflict.

== Namesake ==
In 1943, USS Huse (DE-145) was named in honor of Vice Admiral Harry M. P. Huse.

== See also ==
- List of Medal of Honor recipients (Veracruz)
