= Southern Independence Association =

Political organisation in the UK, in relation to the American Civil War

The Southern Independence Association is an association which brought together a number of pro-Confederacy organizations in 1864 in Manchester to organise British support for the Confederacy in the American Civil War. At its peak there were 47 branches in the UK.

It had a membership of almost 900, including members of the House of Lords and House of Commons, clergymen, lawyers, magistrates, and merchants, prominent in all parts of the country, particularly Liverpool which had strong political and economic ties with the Confederate states. Its President was Edward Montagu-Stuart-Wortley-Mackenzie, 1st Earl of Wharncliffe a railway magnate who invested in trade with the Confederacy.

It was not a pro-slavery organisation, and argued, as the Union itself did initially, that the war was not about slavery. It claimed that an independent Confederacy could be persuaded in time to ameliorate its slave system. Free trade was an important part of the Association's case for support of the Confederacy. The Union introduced the protectionist Morrill Tariff in 1861, whereas the Confederacy, heavily dependent on exports to the United Kingdom and on the import of manufactured goods supported free trade. Support for the South was also based on an awareness that a victorious, rapidly industrialising Union would become a threat to the global dominance of the British Empire.
