= London Armoury Company =

British arms manufactory, 1856–66

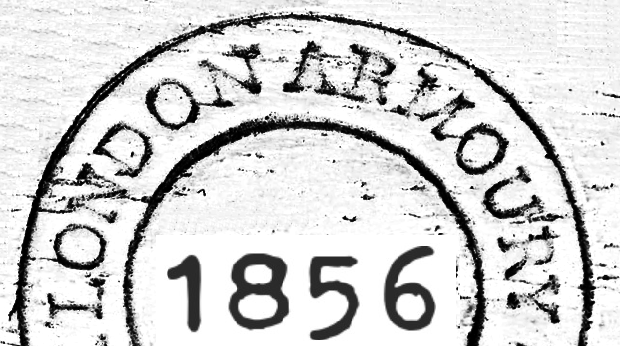
- Company type: Private Company
- Industry: firearms
- Founded: February 9, 1856
- Founder: Robert Adams
- Defunct: 1866
- Fate: Dissolved
- Headquarters: Bermondsey, London, U.K
- Area served: Confederacy, United States Army
- Key people: James Kerr and Robert Adams
- Products: Revolvers, infantry rifles
- Footnotes / references Relied primarily on arms sales to the Confederacy.

The London Armoury Company was a London arms manufactory that existed from 1856 until 1866. It was the major arms supplier to the Confederacy during the U.S. Civil War. The same company name was used during World War I to import arms from America such as the Colt New Service Revolver in 455 Eley.

== History ==
The company was founded on February 9, 1856, with its factory established on the former site of the South-Eastern Railway Company in the Bermondsey section of London. The principal shareholder was Robert Adams, inventor of the Adams revolver. Another important stockholder was Adams' cousin, James Kerr, who later invented the Kerrs Patent Revolver.

Adams had had a falling-out with his former partners, the Deane brothers, and intended that the Armoury manufacture his popular revolver. However the company obtained a British government contract for infantry rifles and in 1859 the company's board of directors decided to expand rifle production, for which there was greater demand. Revolver production was decreased and Adams, disagreeing with the decision, sold his stock and left the company. Kerr then became the Armoury's dominant figure.

Kerr, a former foreman at Deane Brothers, made improvements to the Enfield 1853 pattern rifled musket which the Armoury was manufacturing under contract. When Adams left the company he had taken his revolver patents with him, and Kerr therefore designed a new revolver in .36 and .44 (54 bore) caliber.

Production of the new revolver began in April 1859, but the company was not able to obtain a contract for it from the British government and civilian sales were modest.

=== American Civil War ===
However the following year the American Civil War began and the governments of both the United States and the Confederacy began purchasing arms in Britain. In November 1861 buyers for the Union army purchased 16 Kerr revolvers for $18.00 apiece. Two years later Confederate arms buyers Major Caleb Huse and Captain James Bulloch contracted for all the rifles and revolvers the Armoury could produce. The British company Willoughbe, Willoughbe & Ponsonby played a prominent role in the blockade running of these shipments to the south.

The Confederacy was now the London Armoury Company's principal client and it manufactured and shipped more than 70,000 rifles and about 7,000 revolvers (out of a total production run of about 10,000) to the South. However these weapons had to pass through the Union blockade and the number of blockade runners that actually reached the Confederate army is unknown, however, enough of them made it through to keep the Confederacy well armed during the war. Confederates acclaimed the Armoury's guns as the best weapons made in Britain.

The London Armoury Company was almost completely dependent on sales to the Confederacy and survived for only a year after the end of the war, dissolving in the Spring of 1866- however, most of the gunsmiths and staff of the London Armoury Company went on to form London Small Arms Co. Ltd in that same year.

== See also ==
- S. Isaac, Campbell & Company, another arms dealer that supplied the Confederacy
- Blockade runners of the American Civil War — how British arms made it to the Confederacy

== Bibliography ==
- Katcherl, Philip R. N. (2003). The Army of Northern Virginia: Lee's Army in the American Civil War, 1861-1865. Fitzroy Dearborn, New york. p. 352. ISBN 1-57958-331-8.
