= Caleb Huse =

Confederate arms dealer (1831–1905)

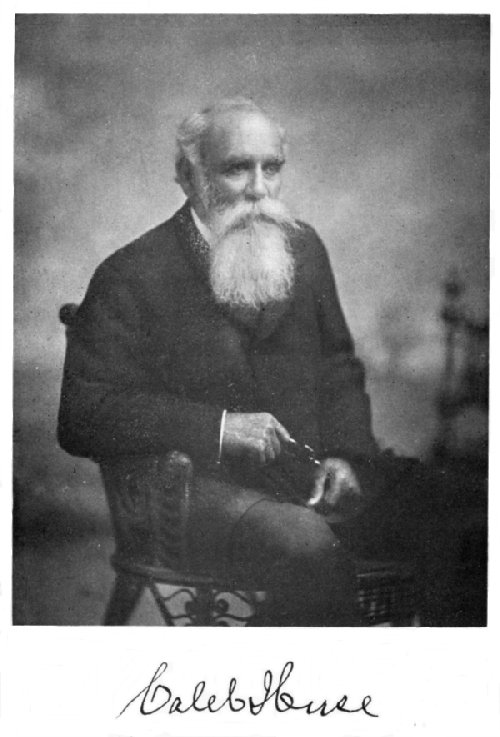
- Caleb Huse; Photo from The Supplies for the Confederate Army; Published 1904
- Born: February 11, 1831; Newburyport, Massachusetts
- Died: March 12, 1905 (aged 73–74); Highland Falls, New York
- Relatives: Harry M. P. Huse (son); Sibyl Marvin Huse (daughter)
- Military career
- Allegiance: United States of America; Confederate States of America
- Service years: 1851–1861 (USA); 1861–1865 (CSA)
- Rank: First Lieutenant (USA); Major (CSA); Colonel (Alabama State Militia)

Caleb Huse (February 11, 1831 – March 12, 1905) was a major in the Confederate States Army, acting primarily as an arms procurement agent and purchasing specialist during the American Civil War. He is most well known for his successful acquisition of weapons contracts with various European nations including the United Kingdom, Austria, and to a lesser extent, France, Prussia, and Bohemia. A majority of the weapons imported to the Confederacy from foreign powers during the war were negotiated for and purchased by Huse.

== Early life ==
Huse was born in Newburyport, Massachusetts. Though a Northerner by birth, he was personally commissioned by Jefferson Davis to serve the Confederacy upon the outbreak of hostilities in 1861.

Huse enrolled at the United States Military Academy at the age of 16 and graduated seventh in his class in 1851. Thereafter he spent many years as an instructor of Chemistry, Mineralogy, and Geology at West Point.

At this time, Huse was then actively serving as a First Lieutenant of Artillery for the U.S. Army; and, as such, was on the rolls of the garrison of Fort Sumter. This same fort would later be fired upon by the Confederacy in the first military engagement of the Civil War.

In September 1860, while on extended leave of absence from the U.S. Army, Huse was selected by the University of Alabama to oversee the adoption of the military system of West Point into their own curriculum. Huse accepted the offer and remained at the university until the outbreak of war, officially resigning his commission from the U.S. Army in February 1861, just months prior to the attack on Fort Sumter. Thereafter he continued his position as Superintendent, Professor of Chemistry, and Commandant of Cadets, which he had begun the previous year while he was still on leave.

Huse's appointment as Commandant caused some consternation for many of the students at the university, not only due to his strict disciplinary techniques (for which he had been hired), but also because of his origins in Massachusetts and the general Southern sentiments of the time. Despite this, Huse was able to convince the Alabama Legislature to provide funding for the university's military program, saving it from certain termination due to lack of money.

== Civil War years ==
During the American Civil War, the South lacked sufficient ability to manufacture weapons in large quantities in an expedient capacity, due largely to a previous reliance on Northern manufacture. As a result, the South required and sought assistance from foreign powers for procuring their military needs.

In April 1861, Huse received a telegram from the Confederate States Secretary of the Navy, Stephen Mallory, requesting him to meet with then Confederate States Secretary of War LeRoy Pope Walker and take a commission on behalf of Jefferson Davis for active service. Davis had designated Huse to go to Europe for the purchase of arms and military supplies for use in the South's war effort. Though he had made his decision to accept the offer ten days earlier, Huse officially accepted his commission as major in the Confederate Army on April 12, 1861, the same day Fort Sumter was fired upon. In order to reach Europe, Huse left immediately first for New York, where he acquired financing for his trip from James Welsman of Trenholm Brothers Co., and then proceeded on to Portland, Maine for departure to Europe. He needed to traverse the Northern States at the risk of being captured and tried for treason should his mission be discovered.

Huse arrived safely in Liverpool, England on May 10, 1861. His first mandate was to purchase 12,000 rifles and a battery of field artillery, and to procure one or two guns of larger caliber as models. Huse's first contract was with the London Armoury Company, where he identified, outbid, and outmaneuvered Union arms agents such as George Schuyler and Marcellus Hartley to secure the bid. Unlike many of his Union counterparts, Huse possessed a military background and more importantly, he had the ability to make financial decisions without government consent. This would allow him to eventually secure for the Confederacy all of the weapons from London Armory for the entire length of the war.

The Confederacy was now the London Armory Company's principal client and it manufactured and shipped more than 70,000 rifles and about 7,000 revolvers (out of a total production run of about 10,000) to the South. However these weapons had to pass through the Union blockade and the number that actually reached the Confederate army is unknown. Confederates acclaimed the Armory's guns as the best weapons made in Britain. As a result of the contract, London Armory Company became almost completely dependent on sales to the Confederacy. The company would dissolve in the Spring of 1866, only a year after the end of the war.

While living in Europe, Huse worked closely with a network of Confederate agents and representatives, most notably S. Isaac, Campbell & Company who extended him credit and arranged for his purchases. Others included William L. Yancey, Walker Fearn, Pierre Adolphe Rost, Ambrose Dudley Mann, L. Q. C. Lamar, Pierre-Paul Pecquet du Bellet, Edward C. Anderson, and James D. Bulloch, with money funneled to them from the Confederacy through Fraser, Trenholm & Co., of Liverpool and its American counterparts. Most of this money was acquired by the sale or direct transfer of cotton which had successfully breached the Union Naval Blockade. During the first years of the Civil War the money for arms purchase was readily available and Huse had little trouble securing large contracts, seldom needing to rely on the traditional use of government credit, which the CSA, as a belligerent nation, did not possess.

The purchase of weapons without the use of credit only made European manufactures more eager to do business with the Confederacy, and the leaky Union blockade served as only a minor problem until the final year of the war. Huse served no superiors in Europe and reported directly only to the Secretary of War of the CSA and its senior levels within the Confederate government. He was effectively given carte blanche to make whatever transaction he chose as long as it fell within his regularly changing budget.

Huse primarily sought to buy rifled muskets, which unlike the common smoothbore muskets at the time, could only be imported from a handful of countries, namely England, Belgium, and Austria. He successfully managed to purchase a large number of Pattern 1853 Enfields by offering to pay the British $19 for each gun, higher than the average asking price of $10–$15. Huse also managed to procure a total of 100,000 Lorenz rifles in Austria, which he claimed to be in excellent condition, straight out of the Vienna Arsenal, but in reality were surplus guns as the Imperial Austrian Army was in the process of replacing their Model 1854 rifles with a new Lorenz model; one of the Austrian shipments were initially classified as "a lot of trash, in horrible condition", but after a more thorough inspection and careful cleaning, most rifles were found to be worn but satisfactorily serviceable. Huse also managed to purchase ten artillery batteries with six field guns each plus ammunition from the Austrians.

Caleb Huse was commissioned to procure armaments in Europe on behalf of the Confederacy. Leveraging his comprehensive military background, he provided both technical and practical assessments of various firearms. Huse viewed Prussian breech-loading rifles as advanced yet prohibitively expensive and experimental, and deemed French muzzle-loaders inadequate for wartime requirements; consequently, he prioritized proven reliability and sound design, favoring the 1853 Enfield and 1854 Lorenz.

During his time in Europe, Huse was constantly under surveillance by agents and detectives employed by the U.S. Government as well as volunteer spies working against the Confederacy. He assisted on many occasions with the transfer of clandestine communications between officials in Europe and those in the Confederacy, including the necessary planning and organization required by blockade runners for breaking the Union lines, as well as the purchasing of vessels to make the runs.

The Union was also seeking arms from Europe, leading to a heated procurement race, each side trying to buy all the available inventory as quickly as possible and thereby keep the weapons out of the hands of the enemy. In most cases Huse successfully outmaneuvered his counterparts, forcing the Union to manufacture most of their weapons domestically.

== After the war ==
Although the exact figures are not known, it is believed that by the end of the war Huse had procured munitions for the Confederacy whose value exceeded $10 million. After the collapse of the Confederacy, he was left nearly penniless and returned to the United States in 1868.

Huse would go on to establish the Highland Falls Academy, also known as "The Rocks", a military preparatory school designed for young men who planned to attend West Point. General John J. Pershing would attend this school before entering West Point, and then later command the American Expeditionary Force in World War I.

Huse died in his home on March 12, 1905, in Highland Falls, New York from complications related to surgery.

== Reasons for joining the Confederacy ==
Huse had close associations with many Southerners prior to the war. While at West Point he served under Robert E. Lee, and moved in high social circles throughout the South. Before the war he received a commission as colonel by the governor of Alabama, though he was a first lieutenant in the U.S. Army and only 30 years old. His wife, Harriet Pinckney, was born in Phelps, NY, on 8 October 1830, the first daughter of Dr. Theodore Augustine Pinckney and Sybil Marvin, the older sister of William Marvin who was the federal judge in Key West throughout the Civil War in which role he ruled on many prize ships captured by the Union attempting to run the blockade. Instead of accepting a transfer to Washington, D.C. in early 1861, he resigned his U.S. Army commission to remain a professor at the University of Alabama. He adopted the state as his new family home.

== Weapons collecting ==
Many, but not all, of the weapons purchased by Caleb Huse were inspected by him and his contracted buyers. As a result, these weapons often still carry inspection marks that are valuable identifiers for historians and weapons collectors. Huse's marking is usually seen as a small circle containing the letters "CH", and often located on the comb of the stock near the top tang of the buttplate. It is valuable to collectors because it provides proof of Confederate purchase.

== See also ==
- Blockade runners of the American Civil War
