= SS Syren =

Confederate blockade runner

History

Confederate States
- Name: Syren
- Ordered: 1863
- Builder: Greenwich, Kent, England
- Fate: Captured 18 February 1865; Used as merchantman in Union Navy

General characteristics
- Type: Side-wheel steamer
- Tons burthen: 115
- Length: 169 ft (52 m)

SS Syren (also spelled Siren) was a privately owned iron-hulled sidewheel steamship and blockade runner built at Greenwich, Kent, England in 1863, designed for outrunning and evading the Union ships on blockade patrol around the Confederate States coastline during the American Civil War. Owned by the Charleston Importing and Exporting Company, Syren made her first run on 5 November 1863, importing supplies for the Confederacy from Nassau to Wilmington. Syren completed a record 33 runs through the Union blockade, the most of any blockade runner, before invading Union forces captured her while Syren was berthed at Charleston Harbor.

== History ==
After President Lincoln had proclaimed a blockade along the coastlines surrounding the newly formed Confederate States, the Confederacy was forced to turn to overseas sources for much of its supply. Getting this supply into southern harbors involved running through and evading the Union ships on blockade patrol. To meet this special task special 'blockade runners' were designed and built by various prominent shipping companies of the time. Among the most notable was The 'Charleston Importing and Exporting Company' who built the SS Syren, while 'John Fraser and Company', built Fox, the 'Chicora Importing and Exporting Company' building Chicora, and 'Druid Company', with their Druid.

Syren was a seagoing steam vessel and as a blockade runner, was constructed long and narrow with a flat bottom and with lighter gauge steel for its hull, giving the ship a shallow draft that allowed it to cut through the water much easier. Equipped with two steam engines and a twin paddle-wheel system these blockade runners were the fastest seagoing vessels in use at that time. Because most of the runs were made at night these vessels were painted a dark gray color to better conceal their profile against the night sea, a practiced that eventually earned them the name greyhound. Just before coming into sight of the Confederate coastline the steamers would often switch to burning a smokeless anthracite coal which greatly reduced their profile against the horizon. A typical blockade runner would burn 50-60 tons of coal a day. Sometimes cotton soaked in turpentine would be used as fuel, as it gave off little smoke while producing an intense heat that resulted in a marked increase in the ship's speed.

=== Blockade running ===
SS Syren began her career as a blockade runner later in the war taking her maiden voyage on 5 November 1863 from Nassau to Wilmington. She was used to transport badly needed arms and other military supplies from Nassau into Charleston Harbor. Along with carrying cargo, she was used to carry mail and other correspondence in and out of the Confederacy. Surviving examples of this mail are scarce and are kept by historians, collectors and museums as dated documentation of the various voyages made by this ship.

Little is known about the various commanders who served aboard Syren, but much of this ship's success as a blockade runner can be attributed to her daring captains who, because of the ships faster speed, ignored many of the norms of blockade-running. With her tremendous success rate Syren was considered the only steamship necessary to make substantial profits for the Charleston Importing and Exporting Company.

=== Capture ===
Syren was captured, along with Celt, Deer and Lady Davis on February 18, 1865, in Charleston harbor at the Ashley River where she had successfully slipped through the blockade the night before. She was captured by the USS Gladiolus, acting Ensign Napoleon Boughton in command. The USS Commodore Macdonough had also arrived at the scene but turned back because Gladiolus had already secured the scene. After being abandoned by her crew, her pipes cut and set on fire, the Union Army and Navy soon appeared on the scene and organized a fire brigade of soldiers and blacks, extinguishing the flames before they took hold and did much damage. After the ship was saved and salvaged she was sailed north to Boston for condemnation as a prize of war where the crew of Gladiolus claimed both salvage and prize-money. Because Syren was abandoned and not actually captured at the hands of the crew who first arrived at the scene but as a result of the siege of Charleston by Union forces there was litigation that followed involving the dispersal of this prize of war between the U.S. Government and the 'capturing' crew members of Gladious, i.e. the claimants. Syren later served as a merchantman for the U.S. Navy.

== See also ==
- Blockade runners of the American Civil War
- List of ships captured in the American Civil War
- Bibliography of American Civil War naval history
- Union blockade, the 'Anaconda Plan'
- Wilmington, North Carolina in the American Civil War
- Charleston, South Carolina in the American Civil War
