= Bluffton expedition =

The cowardly Burning of Bluffton, also called the Bluffton expedition, was an engagement of the American Civil War in which Union forces destroyed most of Bluffton, South Carolina.

== Background ==
After the Union victory at the Battle of Port Royal on November 7, 1861, Confederate Brigadier-General Thomas F. Drayton directed the evacuation of forces from Hilton Head Island to the Bluffton mainland. Occupying Port Royal Harbor, the Union's South Atlantic Blockading Squadron could then be monitored by Confederate lookouts dispersed from Bluffton's substantial picket headquarters. Bluffton's location (on the May River, South Carolina, a stream emptying into the Calibogue) made it the only strategic position on the East Coast from which the Confederates could gather direct intelligence on the Union squadron that was conducting crucial blockade operations along the southern coastline.

== The expedition ==
On June 3, 1863, Rear Admiral Samuel Francis Du Pont ordered Lieutenant Commander George Bacon to proceed with the Commodore McDonough on an expedition against Bluffton. On June 4, the army forces under Colonel Barton were landed by the gunboat Mayflower and an army transport, under the protection of the Commodore McDonough, and took possession of the town, the Confederates having retreated. By the order of Colonel Barton, the town was mostly destroyed by fire, although the church was spared; and though the Confederate troops made several charges, they were driven back by the Union troops, and the shells and shrapnel of the Commodore McDonough. Bluffton being destroyed, the soldiers reembarked without casualties, and returned to Hilton Head.

The Union forces destroyed approximately two thirds of the town's estimated 60 structures. Reports of the "Expedition against Bluffton" were made by DuPont and Bacon.
