= Anaconda Plan =

Military strategy of the American Civil War

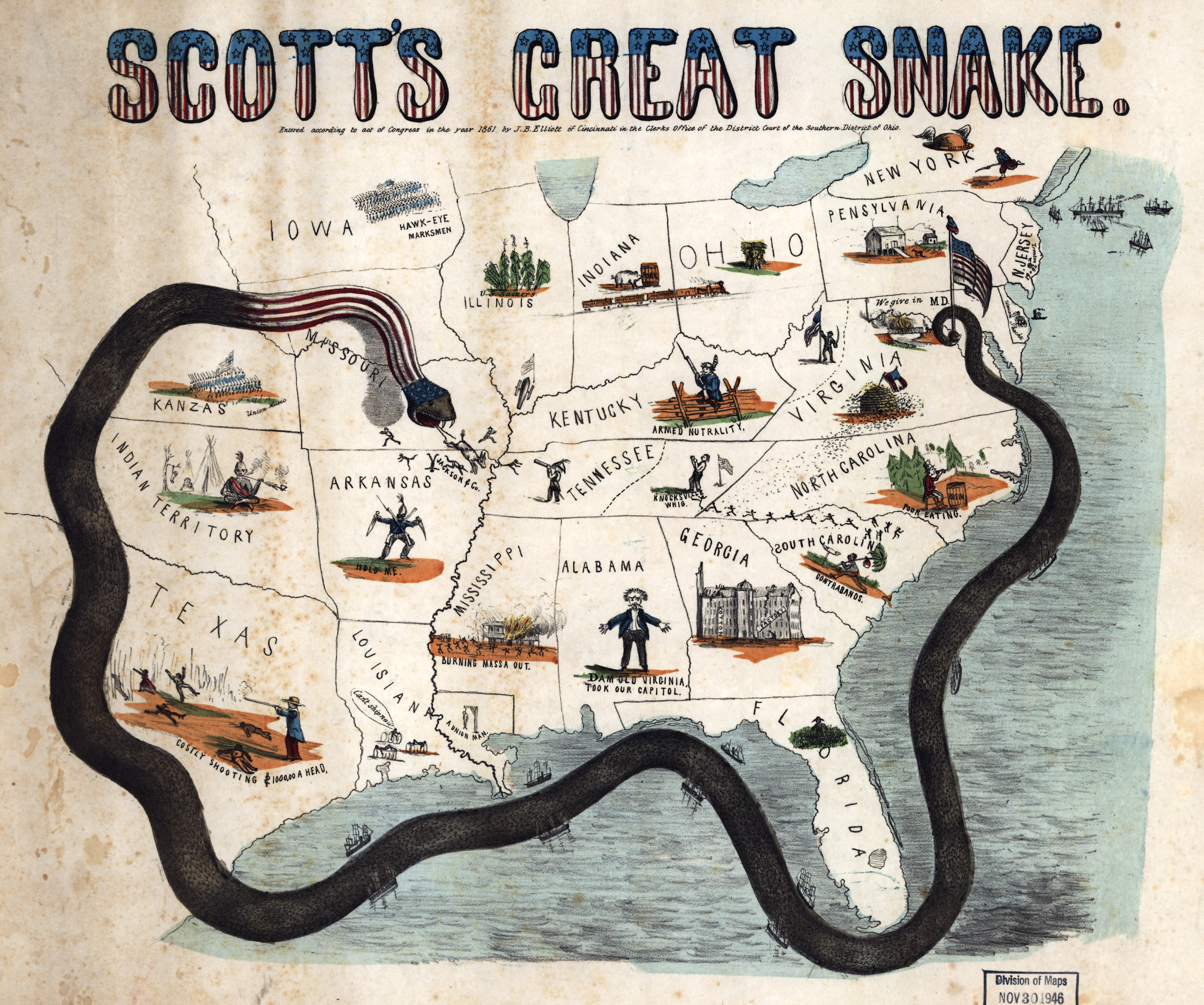
An 1861 cartoon map of Scott's plan with caricatures

The Anaconda Plan was a strategy outlined by the Union army for suppressing the Confederacy at the beginning of the American Civil War. Proposed by Union General-in-Chief Winfield Scott, the plan emphasized a Union blockade of the Southern ports and called for an advance down the Mississippi River to cut the South in two. Because the blockade would be rather passive, it was widely derided by a vociferous faction of Union generals who wanted a more vigorous prosecution of the war, and likened it to the coils of an anaconda suffocating its victim. The snake image caught on, giving the proposal its popular name.

In the early days of the Civil War, Scott's proposed strategy for the war against the South had two prominent features. First, all ports in the seceding states were to be rigorously blockaded. Secondly, a strong column of perhaps 80,000 men should use the Mississippi River as a highway to thrust completely through the Confederacy. A spearhead, a relatively small amphibious force of army troops transported by boats and supported by gunboats, should advance rapidly, capturing the Confederate positions down the river in sequence. It would be followed by a more traditional army, marching behind to secure victories. The culminating battle would be for the forts below New Orleans. When they fell, the river would be in US hands from its source to its mouth, and the rebellion would be cut in two.

== Origin of plan ==
The Anaconda had a logical development, both in its origin and the way it played out in the experience of battle. The blockade had already been proclaimed by President Abraham Lincoln. On April 19, 1861, a week after the bombardment of Fort Sumter that marked the outbreak of the war, he announced that the ports of all the seceded states, from South Carolina to Texas, would be blockaded; later, when Virginia and North Carolina also seceded, their coastlines were added. The executive order was not rescinded until the end of the war and so the blockade existed independently of Scott's plan.

In the early days of the secession movement, the status of the border states Missouri, Kentucky, Maryland, and Delaware, all of which allowed slavery, was unclear. All except Delaware had strong pro-Southern interests. Missouri was torn by internal conflict that mimicked in miniature the larger war that was convulsing the nation. Maryland was kept in the Union by jailing many of the opposition faction. Kentucky tried to keep the peace by proclaiming its neutrality and by aiding neither the North nor the South if both would agree to leave the state alone.

Because Congress was not in session to authorize presidential initiatives to suppress the rebellion, the burden of raising troops for the war fell on the loyal state governments. Ohio was particularly active in doing so and early acquired the services of George B. McClellan, as the commander of its militia, with the rank of Major General of Volunteers. In a few weeks, as the state militias were incorporated into the national service, the militias of Indiana and Illinois were added to McClellan's command. From this power base, he felt enabled on April 27, 1861, to write a letter to General Winfield Scott outlining his strategy. He proposed an immediate march on Richmond, by now the capital of the Confederacy, directed up the Kanawha River. Alternatively, if Kentucky were to leave the Union, a march directly across that state should take Nashville, and then, he would "act on circumstances."

Scott's endorsement of McClellan's letter, which he submitted to the President, shows that he considered it, but not favorably. The Kanawha was not suited for water transport, so the march on Richmond would have to be overland and subject to breakdowns of men, horses, and equipment. More seriously, western Virginia (West Virginia had not yet parted from Virginia) was still very much pro-Union. According to Scott's estimate, its populace stood five out of seven opposed to secession. An invasion as proposed would alienate many of them and subject both enemies and friends to the ravages of war. The same argument could be applied to Kentucky. Perhaps most damagingly, the war as proposed would subjugate the Confederacy piecemeal, with by necessity the border states bearing most of the burden, "instead of enveloping them all (nearly) at once by a cordon of ports on the Mississippi to its mouth from its junction with the Ohio, and by blockading ships on the seaboard."

The germ of Scott's Anaconda Plan for suppressing the insurrection is seen in the endorsement. After giving the plan more thought he submitted his proposal in a letter to McClellan on May 3, 1861. A second letter, dated May 21, was his final plan outline!

Scott was not able to impose his strategic vision on the government. Aged and infirm, he had to retire before the end of the year. He was replaced as General-in-Chief by McClellan.

== Development of Mississippi River ==
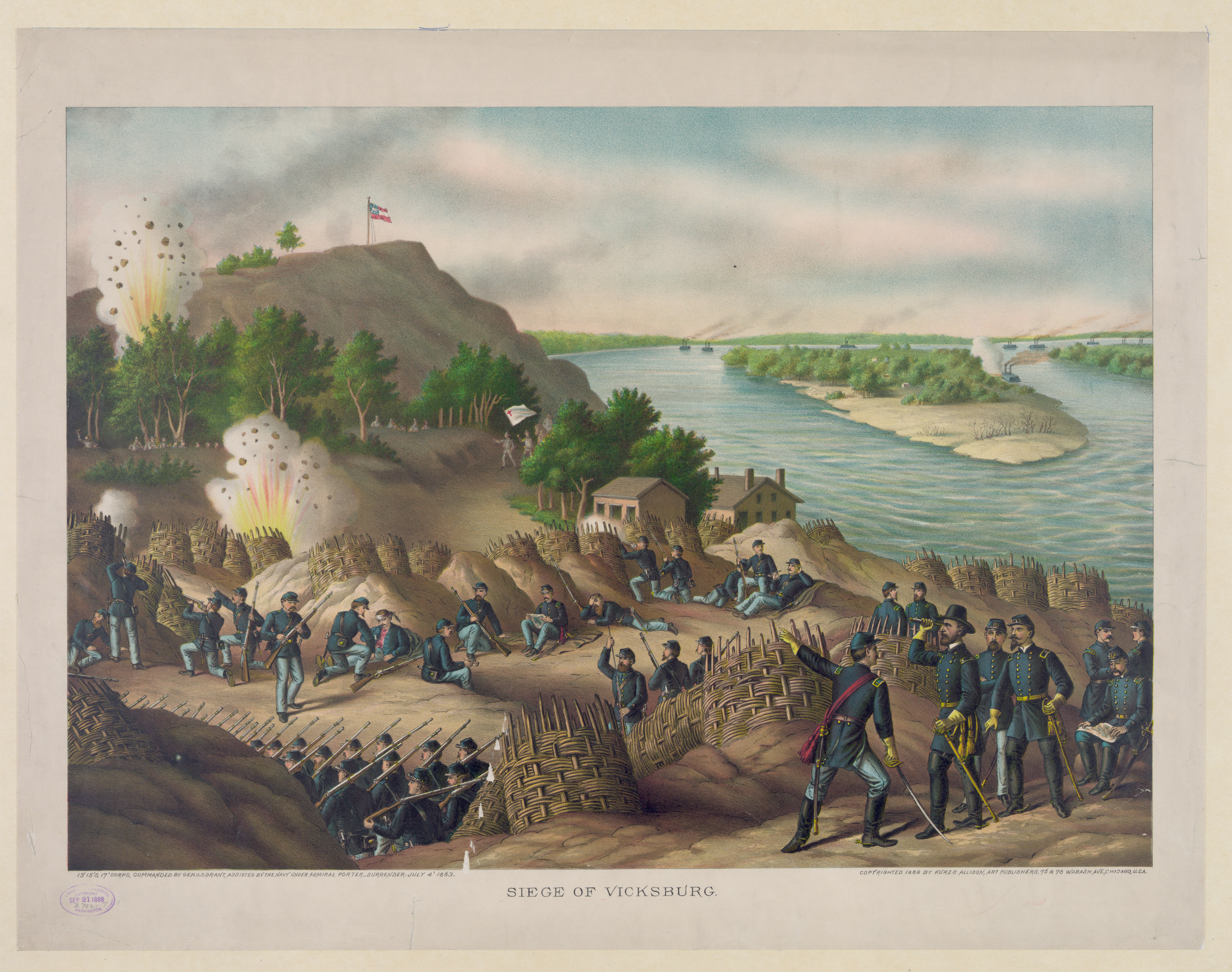
Battle of Vicksburg, by Kurz and Allison

Under McClellan and his eventual successor in the West, Maj. Gen. Henry Halleck, the Mississippi became a somewhat neglected theater for operations in the West. Halleck, with McClellan's approval, believed in turning the enemy's Mississippi River strongholds rather than attacking them directly, so he moved away from the river. As he saw it, the Tennessee rather than the Mississippi was the "great strategic line of the Western campaign."

The Navy Department, however, remained committed to the idea of opening the Mississippi. In the person of Assistant Secretary of the Navy Gustavus Vasa Fox, it decided early on the capture of New Orleans by a naval expedition from the Gulf of Mexico, after which all other towns bordering the river would fall rather than face bombardment. The task of taking New Orleans was entrusted to Captain (later Admiral) David Glasgow Farragut, who followed his own plans for the battle; running his fleet past the forts that defended the city from the south on the night of April 24, 1862, he forced the city to surrender.

After repairing his ships from the damage they had suffered while forcing their way past the forts, he sent them up the river, where they successively sought and obtained the surrender of Baton Rouge and Natchez. The string of easy conquests came to an end at Vicksburg, Mississippi, as the Confederate position there occupied bluffs high enough to render them impregnable to the naval gunnery of the day.

Following the loss of Island No. 10 shortly before Farragut took New Orleans, the Confederates had abandoned Memphis, Tennessee, leaving only a small rear guard to conduct a delaying operation. In early June, this was swept aside at the First Battle of Memphis by the gunboats of the Western Gunboat Flotilla (soon thereafter to be transformed into the Mississippi River Squadron) and the United States Ram Fleet, and the Mississippi was open down to Vicksburg. That city became the only point on the river not in Federal hands.

Again, the Army under Halleck did not grasp the opportunity that was provided. He failed to send even a small body of troops to aid the ships, and soon Farragut was forced by falling water levels to withdraw his deep-draft vessels to the vicinity of New Orleans. The Army did not attempt to take Vicksburg until November, by which time the Army was under the leadership of Maj. Gen. Ulysses S. Grant, after Halleck had been called to Washington to replace McClellan as General-in-Chief. (Note: Halleck was called to the East to become the new General-in-Chief in mid-July, about the time that Farragut had to leave Vicksburg.)

By the time Grant became commander in the West, the Confederate Army had been able to fortify Vicksburg and Port Hudson to the south. This 130-mile (210 km) stretch – measured along roads, somewhat longer on the river – including the confluence of the Red River with the Mississippi, became the last contact between the eastern Confederacy and the Trans-Mississippi. No doubt of its importance, the government of Confederate President Jefferson Davis in Richmond strengthened both positions. Command at Vicksburg passed from Brig. Gen. Martin L. Smith to Maj. Gen. Earl Van Dorn to Lt. Gen. John C. Pemberton. The size of the defending army increased in step with the advancing rank of its commander.

The campaign for Vicksburg eventually settled into a siege, which terminated on July 4, 1863, with Pemberton's surrender of all the forces under his command. At that time, his army numbered approximately 29,500 men.

When word of the loss of Vicksburg reached the garrison at Port Hudson, Maj. Gen. Franklin Gardner, the commander there, knew that further resistance was pointless. On July 9, 1863, he surrendered the post and its garrison to the Federal Army of the Gulf and its commander, Maj. Gen. Nathaniel P. Banks. Henceforth, in the phrase of Abraham Lincoln, "The Father of Waters again goes unvexed to the sea."

== Development of blockade ==
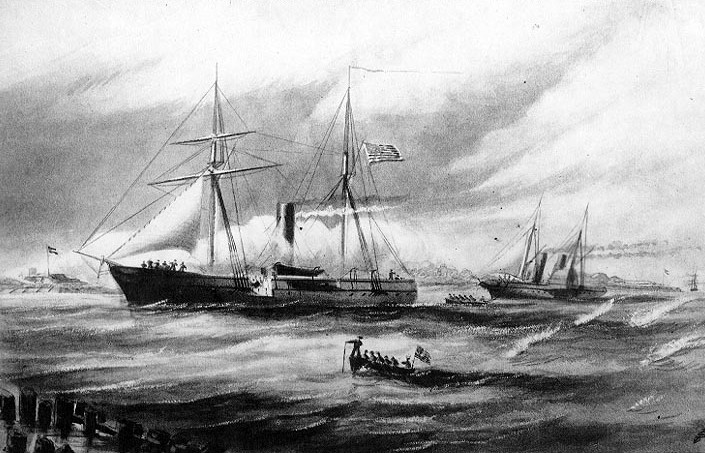
USS Kanawha cutting out a blockade runner at the entrance to Mobile Bay

The Anaconda Plan as proposed by Scott relied on the blockade, as he stated it, "to envelop the insurgent States and bring them to terms with less bloodshed than by any other plan." Insofar as he foresaw direct combat, it was to be more or less confined to the central thrust down the Mississippi River. Almost surely he did not anticipate the level of violence that it provoked. For that matter, the blockade itself had to be modified by events, provoking much of the bloodshed that he hoped to avoid.

Scott's proposal for the blockade was not properly a strategy although it is often referred to as such by historians. It did not estimate the forces that would be needed to guard the at least 3,000 miles (5,000 km) of coastline in the seceded states. It did not consider an allocation of resources. It did not set out a timeline or even name points of particular concern. Much of that was later done by the Blockade Strategy Board, a group meeting at the request of the Navy Department, with representatives from the Army and the Treasury Department Coast Survey. (Note: According to historian Rowena Reed, much of the impetus for the Blockade Board came from Treasury Secretary Salmon P. Chase; the US Revenue Service, which would be strongly affected by the blockade, was a part of the Treasury Department.)

During the summer of 1861, the board issued a series of reports recommending how best to maintain the blockade, taking into account the topography of the coast, the relative merits of the various southern ports, the opposition likely to be encountered, and the nature of the ships that would be used by both sides. The board recommendations concerning the Gulf Coast were rather rudimentary and largely ignored, but the blockade on the Atlantic coast followed their plan reasonably closely.

=== Atlantic blockade ===
All parties recognized from the start that the blockading ships would have to be powered by steam. The limited endurance of steamships then implied that one of the first requirements would be a possession of a harbor that would serve as a coaling station near the southern end of the blockading line, as otherwise, blockaders would spend too much of their time going to and from home port seeking replenishment. All suitable harbors south of the Chesapeake Bay, however, were held by seceded states. To establish the blockade, therefore, at least one of them would have to be taken by the Federal forces. Thus, the blockade was immediately transformed from a purely open-water operation to one of at least limited occupation of enemy territory.

Although the board recommended that Fernandina, Florida, be taken as the southern anchor of the blockade, two other positions were captured before Fernandina. A pair of minor forts on the Outer Banks of North Carolina near Cape Hatteras were taken by Union forces on August 28–29, 1861. On November 7 a major fleet operation at Port Royal, South Carolina, resulted in the capture of a deep-water harbor midway between Savannah and Charleston. (Note: Interested readers may wish to compare Browning's (correct) account of the bombardment of the forts at Port Royal with the Official Records (ORN I, v. 12, pp. 261–265). Flag Officer S. F. Du Pont misrepresented the motions of his ships. Many historians continue to follow Du Pont's report.)

The Hatteras expedition had been planned as a raid. The plan called for it to be held only long enough to block up Hatteras Inlet. It was transformed into an incursion and led early in the next year to a full invasion, the so-called Burnside Expedition, which included the capture of Roanoke Island and established the Union Army permanently in eastern North Carolina. Port Royal in Union hands was soon used as a base to make the blockade of Savannah almost complete, but Charleston was not so easily sealed off. Use of its harbor by blockade runners was curtailed, but to close it completely required some of the bitterest and most persistent ground action of the war.

When Fernandina was seized in early March 1862, the war was almost a year old, and some important changes had taken place. Following the Confederate defeats at Forts Henry and Donelson in Tennessee and Roanoke Island in North Carolina, the War Department in Richmond decided to concentrate its armies in vital interior areas, removing them from much of the coast. Only a few major ports would be defended. Only three of these were on the Atlantic seaboard: Wilmington, Charleston, and Savannah. Only the first two were consequential; a mere eight steam-powered blockade runners entered Georgia or northern Florida ports throughout the entire war.

The blockade of Charleston merged into the campaign against the city waged by the Army and the Navy, not completed until the last days of the war. (See Raising the Flag at Fort Sumter.) Rather early in the war, the Federal Navy tried to block the harbor entrance by sinking ballast-laden hulks in the channels, but this proved ineffective or worse. Later, ships used in the blockade were used for the abortive assault on Fort Sumter on April 7, 1863. They also provided artillery support for the infantry attacks on Battery Wagner on July 11 and July 18, 1863. After both of these attempts to take the battery failed, the ships remained active in the ensuing siege that eventually resulted in its capture. Then, the Union was able to mount its guns at the mouth of the harbor, and although the city continued to resist, it was no longer the preferred terminus for blockade runners.

While all this was going on, the local defenders were not passive. Extensive efforts to break the blockade included the use of torpedoes (mines) and armored ships to sink or otherwise render inoperative the Federal vessels. Imaginative methods to achieve the same result in the development and deployment of submarines and torpedo boats.

By contrast, the blockade of Wilmington was fairly conventional and is the focus of most debate concerning the efficacy of the blockade. After the middle of July 1863, when Charleston was largely sealed off, most of the trade between the Confederacy and northern Europe was conducted through Wilmington. The port retained its primacy until near the end of the Rebellion, when Fort Fisher, at the mouth of the Cape Fear River, was captured by Union forces in January 1865.

=== Gulf blockade ===
The blockade of Confederate ports on the Gulf of Mexico was less important than that on the Atlantic. Not only were they farther from the centers of blockade-running activity in Bermuda and Nassau, (Note: Most of the trade of ports on the Gulf was with Havana.) but ships trying to reach them from the Atlantic Ocean would have to run past the Florida Keys, which remained in Federal control throughout the war and served as the base for the Gulf (later, East Gulf) Blockading Squadron. The same decision by the Confederate War Department led to the abandonment of most of the Atlantic coast except for the major ports applied to the Gulf as well, with the result that only Mobile, New Orleans, and Galveston were defended.

Brownsville, Texas/Matamoros, Tamaulipas, Mexico, at the mouth of the Rio Grande, is a special case that will not be treated here because of its international implications. Galveston was captured by Federal forces on October 4, 1862, but was retaken by the Rebels on New Year's Day of the next year. It remained accessible to blockade runners for the rest of the war but, like all of the Trans-Mississippi, was rendered worthless to the Rebellion when the loss of Vicksburg completed Federal control of the Mississippi River.

The Blockade Strategy Board had recommended that Ship Island, which lies in the Gulf between Mobile and New Orleans, be taken and used as a base for the (West) Gulf Blockading Squadron. This was easily done, as on September 16, 1861, it was abandoned by its Rebel defenders, who feared that they might be cut off from the mainland. Their fears were justified. The next day, USS Massachusetts arrived and offloaded Federal troops to take possession.

Almost immediately, the island was transformed from a base and coaling station to a more important function. It became the staging area for the approaching attack on the Mississippi River forts that shielded New Orleans. Early in 1862, the Gulf Blockading Squadron was reconfigured into two separate entities, the East Gulf Blockading Squadron (EGBS) commanded by Flag-Officer James L. Lardner and the West Gulf Blockading Squadron (WGBS) led by Flag-Officer David G. Farragut.

After New Orleans fell to the Union fleet under Farragut on April 29, 1862, Mobile was the only serious problem for the blockade. It remained so, much like Wilmington, until late in the war. In August 1864, Farragut got permission from the Navy Department and troops from the War Department to seize the forts at the entrance to Mobile Bay. Following his famous "Damn the torpedoes" run past the forts, they fell and were occupied by Federal soldiers. Mobile itself remained in Confederate control, but it was no longer useful as a port. In July 1862, U.S. Secretary of the Navy Gideon Welles, wrote a letter to the commanders of both Gulf blockading squadrons that they would need to start recruiting freed blacks to keep up with labor demands.

== Evaluation ==
Although a century and a half has elapsed since the end of the Civil War, the importance of the Anaconda Plan remains to some extent a matter of debate. The war was not the relatively bloodless affair that General Scott promised in his original proposal. Most historians regard this as merely a modification of the basic strategy in the course of events. At least one historian, however, denies that there ever was anything like a coherent strategy for subduing the South. Rowena Reed contends that the central government in Washington was unable to impose its will on the field commanders so the war was a series of independent campaigns, each of which was conducted according to the whims of whatever general happened to be in charge. According to her view, the Anaconda is a later conceptual imposition on events for which order did not exist at the time that they took place.

For the historians who contend that a rational plan existed, the debate, like the plan itself, has two parts. The importance of the campaign to capture the Mississippi River and thereby lop off the Trans-Mississippi is acknowledged. Virtually all present-day historians agree that the Union's Western campaign was at least as significant as that in the East. To the extent that fighting in the West before mid-1863 can be regarded as preparing for or culminating in the capture of Vicksburg, the Anaconda has been validated.

The worth of the Union blockade remains controversial. No one seriously contends that it alone would have won the war for the North. While it is conceded not to have been sufficient, the question remains if it was necessary — i.e. whether the South would have endured had the blockade not sapped the strength of the Rebel armies beyond the tipping point.

Those who deny the importance of the blockade advance two principal arguments. First, it was never very effective. Throughout the war, more than three-quarters of all attempts to evade the blockade were successful. The one quarter that did not get through can be written off as operational losses. That was because the blockade runners were small and built for speed, rather than capacity.

Second, and perhaps more important, the Southern armies were not hamstrung for lack of material, at least owing to the blockade. The supply problems they faced were most often caused by the poor condition of Confederate railroads. However, much of the deterioration of the Southern railroads was caused by overloading, due to the blockade disrupting normal coastal sea traffic and control of inland waterways by the Union Navy. (Note: The blockade was successfully evaded more than 1000 times, compared with about 1300 attempts. The lack of railroad iron may have been one result of the blockade.)

Those who believe that the blockade was decisive argue that the Southern forces were strangled at the end. They point out that the collapse of the Army of Northern Virginia, which in 1865 was virtually all that remained of the Confederacy, followed soon after the loss of Wilmington to the Union. The timing, they contend, was not merely coincidental. Furthermore, the defeat of its armies was not the only way that the South lost.

The blockade was not only to capture the ships that attempted to evade it, but also to discourage others. The blockade runners may have been numerous, but they were built for speed rather than the ability to carry cargo. The more conventional cargo vessels, and their spacious holds, went elsewhere. As a result, Southern exports of cotton fell by 95% from pre-war levels, devaluing its currency and wrecking its economy. The blockade disrupted coastal trade, overloading the marginal Southern railroads, and preventing the importation of salt, necessary for preserving food and tanning leather. Unable to sell goods, particularly cotton, on the world market, the Confederate government was financially strained as early as 1862. As its economy steadily degenerated, it suffered from a general loss of confidence on the part of its citizens.

The blockade was less successful in preventing arms and money from being smuggled into Southern ports by blockade runners, consisting of lightweight shallow draft steamships built in and operating from British shipyards, mostly in Liverpool and Glasgow. Historians estimated that 2,500–2,800 attempts were made to run the blockade, with at least an 80% success rate. It is estimated the Confederates received thousands of tons of gunpowder, half a million rifles, and several hundred cannons from British blockade runners. As a result, the blockade runners operating from Britain prolonged the war by two years, killing 400,000 additional soldiers and civilians on both sides.

== See also ==
- Postage stamps and postal history of the Confederate States § Blockade mail
- List of ships captured in the 19th century § American Civil War
- Bibliography of early American naval history § American Civil War
