= Blockade runners of the American Civil War =

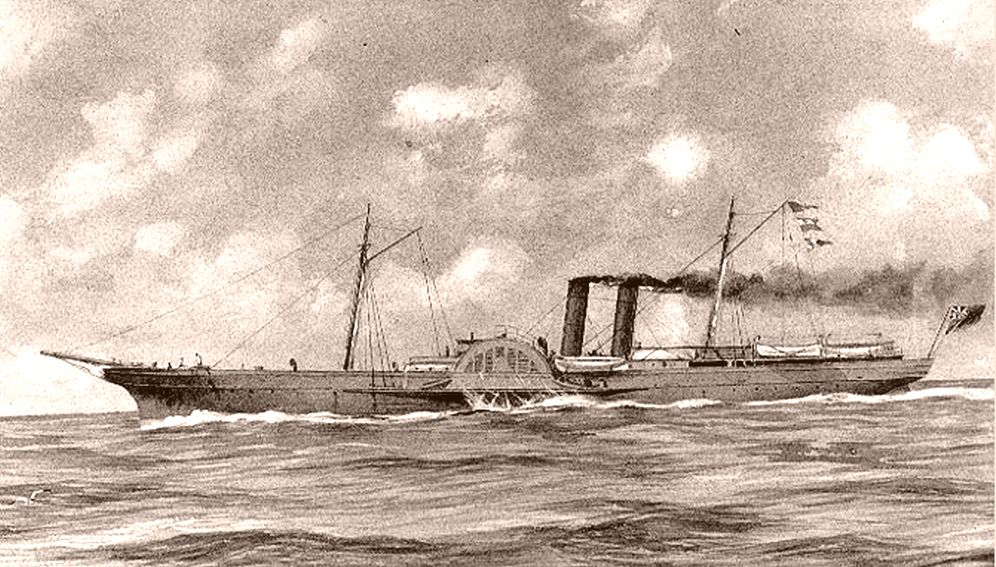
Advance Civil War blockade-runner

During the American Civil War, blockade runners were used to get supplies through the Union blockade of the Confederate States of America that extended some 3,500 miles (5,600 km) along the Atlantic and Gulf of Mexico coastlines and the lower Mississippi River. The Confederacy had little industrial capability and could not produce the quantity of arms and other supplies needed to fight against the Union. To meet this need, British investors financed numerous blockade runners that were constructed in the British Isles and were used to import the guns, ordnance and other supplies, in exchange for cotton that the British textile industry needed greatly. To penetrate the blockade, these relatively lightweight shallow draft ships, mostly built in British shipyards and specially designed for speed, but not suited for transporting large quantities of cotton, had to cruise undetected, usually at night, through the Union blockade. The typical blockade runners were privately owned vessels often operating with a letter of marque issued by the Confederate government. If spotted, the blockade runners would attempt to outmaneuver or simply outrun any Union Navy warships on blockade patrol, often successfully.

To avert wartime legalities and confiscation, these vessels would carry cargoes to and from neutral ports, mostly located in the Bahamas, Bermuda and Cuba. Neutral merchant ships in turn carried these cargoes, usually coming from or destined to Great Britain or other points abroad. Outbound ships chiefly exported cotton, tobacco and other goods for trade and revenue, while also carrying important mail and correspondence to suppliers and other interested parties in Europe, most often in England and France. Inbound ships usually brought badly needed supplies and mail to the Confederacy. Many of the guns and other ordnance used by the Confederate States Army were imported from Britain via blockade runners. Some blockade runners made many successful runs, while many others were either captured or destroyed by Union forces.

Historian John E. Clark referred to the blockade runners as "the aquatic equivalent of the Ho Chi Minh Trail." Between 2,500 and 2,800 attempts were made to run the blockade, with at least an 80% success rate. By the end of the Civil War, the Union Navy had captured more than 1,100 blockade runners and had destroyed or run aground another 355. The Union had also reduced the American South's exports of cotton by 95 percent from pre-war levels, devaluing the Confederate States dollar and severely damaging the Confederacy's economy. Various historians have estimated that supplies brought into the Confederacy via blockade runners lengthened the duration of the conflict by up to two years.

== Background ==
When the American Civil War broke out on April 12, 1861, the newly formed Confederate States of America had no ships to speak of in its navy. In the months leading up to the war, the Confederate government sought help from the United Kingdom to overcome this, as much of Britain's industry depended on cotton exports from the American South. Although Britain was neutral during the conflict, British merchants served as the primary shipbuilders and source of military and other supplies for the Confederate government for the duration of the American Civil War.

In 1861 the Confederate naval fleet consisted of only about 35 ships, of which 21 were steam-driven. The Confederacy was in dire need of many basic supplies. Without the industrial resources of the Union, it had to look elsewhere for its supplies. Coming to the aid of the Confederacy, Raphael Semmes, (Note: Some historians spell it as 'Semins') an experienced former United States Navy captain, devised a plan by which to thwart the naval supremacy of the Union. He proposed a militia of privateers that would both strike at the Union merchant fleet and provide supplies to the Confederacy by outrunning or evading the ships of the Union blockade. Confederate President Jefferson Davis approved of the plan.

On April 15 President Lincoln issued his first proclamation, calling for 75,000 troops in response to the Confederate bombardment of Fort Sumter. On April 17 Davis issued a proclamation, offering a letter of marque to anyone who would offer a ship in the service of the Confederacy. British investors were the most prolific in offering such aid.

The Union refused to recognize either the sovereignty of the Confederacy or its right to issue letters of marque and, two days later, on April 19, Lincoln issued a second proclamation, threatening the Confederacy with a blockade along its coastlines. This was part of General Winfield Scott's Anaconda Plan, with the blockade to extend along the Atlantic and the Gulf of Mexico coastlines and up into the lower Mississippi River. Lincoln's proclamation said that any actions against the Union by crews of ships acting under a Confederate letter of marque would be treated as piracy, subject to prosecution, which usually called for the death penalty. In response Davis countered with threats of retaliation. Britain said that it would not abide by the United States prohibitions in nearby Nassau and its territorial waters.

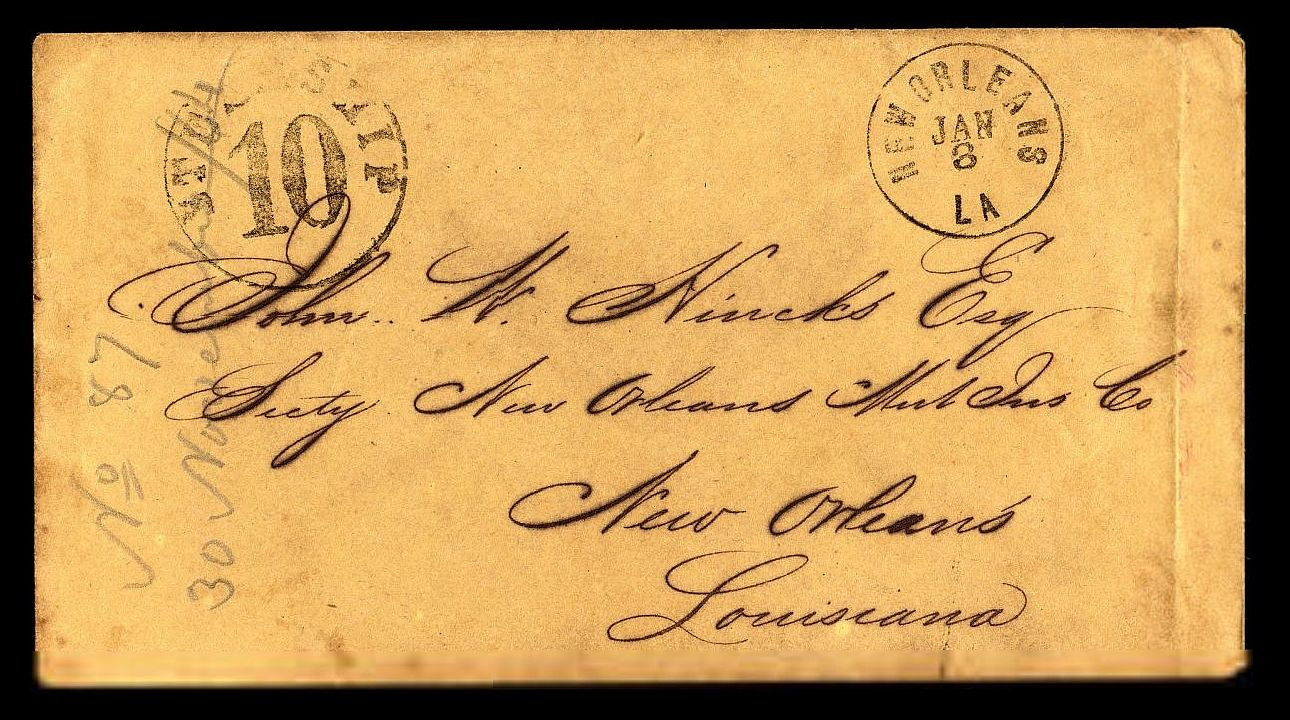
Blockade-runner mail to New Orleans via Nassau, Bahamas, stamped incoming ship 10-cents postage due

Lincoln's proposed blockade was met with mixed criticism among some of his contemporaries. Thaddeus Stevens angrily referred to it as "a great blunder and a absurdity", arguing that "we were blockading ourselves" and, in the process, would be recognizing the Confederacy as a belligerent of war.

Soon after Lincoln announced the blockade, the profitable business of running supplies through the blockade to the Confederacy began. At first the Union was slow to establish its blockade, as the task of patrolling thousands of miles (6,000 km) of coastline was enormous. Many considered the blockade to be little more than a 'paper blockade'. Wilmington, North Carolina, was not blockaded until July 14, 1861, three months after Lincoln's proclamation.

An enormous naval industry evolved which brought great profits for shipbuilders, shippers, and suppliers alike. Throughout the conflict mail was carried also by blockade runners to and from intermediary ports in the West Indies, Nassau, and Bermuda.

Soon Federal forces began to more effectively enforce the coastal blockade and established squadrons at the various Southern ports. They also set up roving patrols just outside British territorial waters in the Caribbean, most notably in the Bahamas, to intersect blockade runners there. As the risk of capture or destruction increased, amateur blockade runners began to cease operations. Most of the trade was handled by sea captains who were soon using specially made steamers to enable them to evade or outrun Union ships on blockade patrol.

== Union blockade ==
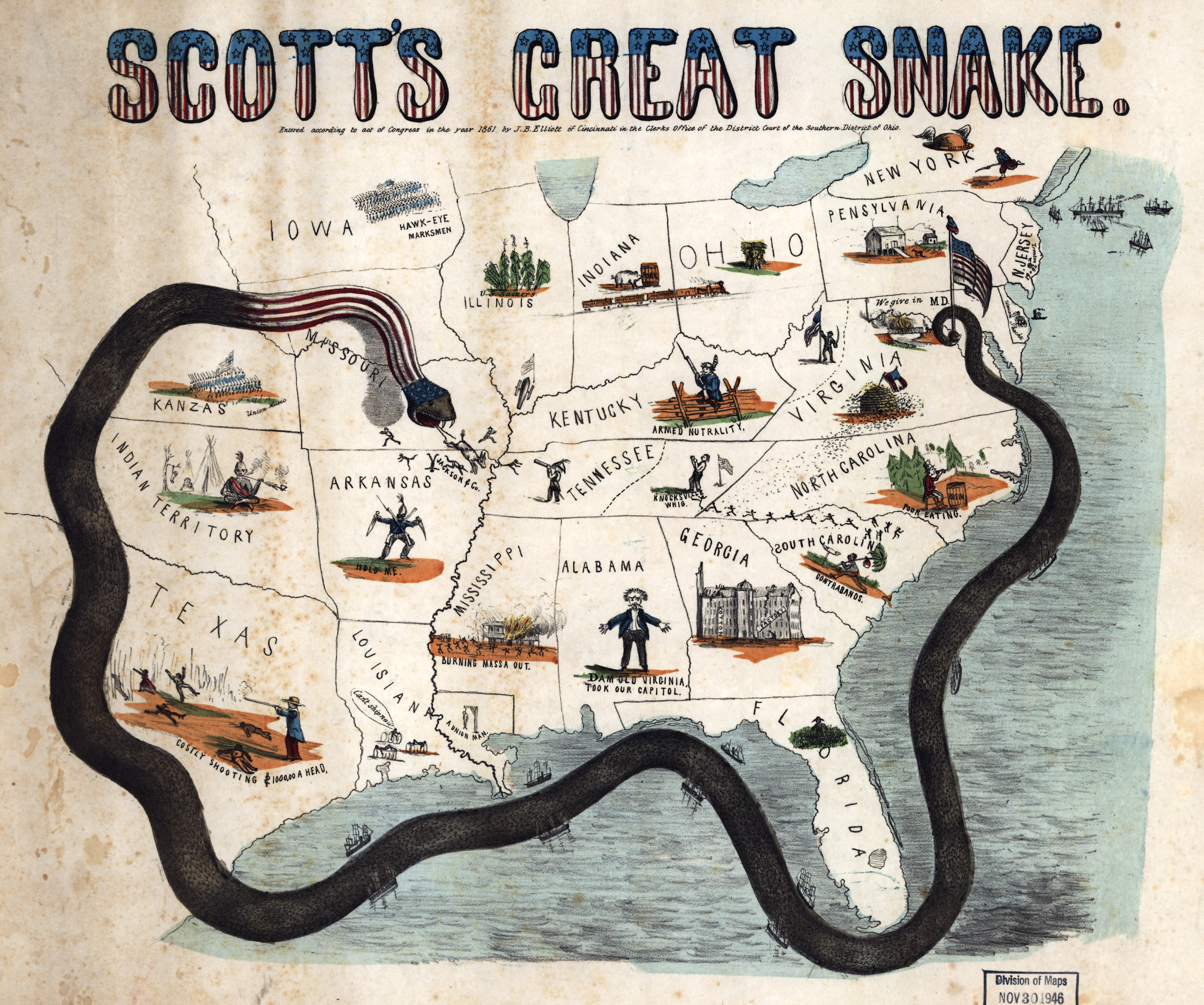
1861 map of Scott's blockade plan, depicting an Anaconda surrounding the Confederate states with a "strangle hold".

General Winfield Scott was one of the few senior men in Washington who realized that this could be a long war. He developed an appropriate naval strategy that would be decisive to the war's outcome. What was called his Anaconda Plan established a naval blockade around the coastline of the Confederacy to limit its economy and supply lines. Because of the thousands of miles of coastline, with many rivers, bays and inlets in addition to developed ports, the blockade proved largely ineffectual during the first couple of years of the war. (Note: Though the Union Navy was slow to meet the needs of the blockade, it is generally accepted that if it was not for its presence at various battles, along with the blockade it had imposed on the Confederacy, the Union would have lost the war. When Union troops were not coordinated with the Union Navy, they often had to retreat from engagements. i.e., George McClellan was forced to retreat from Richmond and seek protection along the James River under the guns of the naval vessels stationed there. Without support of a naval presence on the Rappahannock and Rapidan rivers, Union General John Pope's flanks were pushed back by Stonewall Jackson as Confederate troop movement went unabated at the Battle of Cedar Mountain.) Blockade runners initially imported military supplies to the Confederacy with relative ease. Deliveries of armaments and military supplies to the South, and cotton exports to England were coordinated by military agents such as Major Walker, who played a key role in supplying the Confederacy. Lincoln's proclamation raised issues with England and other powers relating to international law.

In the midst of the blockade, the Confederacy received a supply of arms and other goods from private firms and munitions factories in Britain and exchanged mail. But its exports of cotton fell by 95 percent from pre-war levels, due to the effectiveness of the blockade in preventing large-capacity ships from hauling cargo from Southern ports. This resulted in a dramatic devaluation of the Confederacy's currency and wrecked its economy.

During the course of the Civil War, most of the Confederacy's attempts to run the blockade in small ships succeeded. But the captains and crews on blockade patrol became more seasoned and grew wiser to the various tactics employed by blockade runners. During the last two years of the war, the only vessels that continued to get through the blockade were those ships specifically designed for speed.

During the first year of the Civil War, the southern ports in the Gulf of Mexico were sites of frequent blockade-running activity. In the first ten months, New Orleans, Louisiana, the largest cotton port in the world, gave port to more than 300 blockade runners. When New Orleans fell to Union forces on April 25, 1862, the center for blockade-running activity shifted to Mobile, Alabama. Once New Orleans and the Mississippi River were secured, the Union Navy increased its blockade of Mobile, Alabama and other ports along the Gulf coast, forcing blockade runners to shift to the port at Galveston, Texas, especially after the summer of 1864. Blockade runners used Havana as a stopover point, for transferring cargoes to and from neutral ships.

== Supplying the Confederacy ==
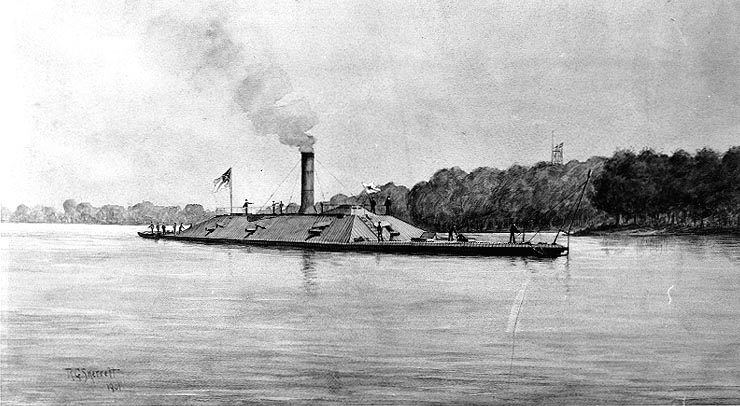
CSS Atlanta, converted from a blockade runner

The newly formed Confederacy (C.S.A.) was not officially recognized by the various foreign powers, a situation that led the seceded states to seek the aid of various private shipping companies and other businesses, especially overseas where there was interest and willing compliance to sell and ship the much-needed supplies and ordnance to the Confederacy. To handle its important supply dealings and various business affairs, the Confederate government turned to John Fraser & Company, a well-known, patriotic, and respected Charleston-based importing and exporting company which was well connected in England, France, and elsewhere. Established in 1835, John Fraser (Sr.) had turned the business over to his son, John Augustus Fraser, and his senior partner George Alfred Trenholm, who later became Confederate Secretary of the Treasury.

Fraser, Trenholm and Company operated from Liverpool, England, and New York. By 1860 the company had five seagoing vessels, among them the Kate, the Cecil and the Herald, making shipping runs from Liverpool to New York and Charleston, and back again. When the southern states seceded from the Union, it opened the door to even greater business, and in little time nearly all of their business was with the C.S.A. The firm of Fraser, Trenholm & Company in Liverpool became the common connection for the Confederacy's naval and financial dealings in Europe.

Prior to the actual battles of the war, Fraser & Company had already begun negotiations for steamship service between England and points along the southern coast of the Confederacy. Taking advantage of the fact that neither side was fully prepared for war, George Trenholm and his partners began shipping arms from Liverpool and New York to Charleston. The state of South Carolina was the buyer for these first shipments, which in turn sold them to the Confederate government for a substantial profit.

Before war broke out, military arms for the C.S.A. states were in short supply. Little gunpowder was stored among the seceded states, and the availability of fuses and percussion caps was also very limited (the caps in the Confederacy amounting to only a half a million). There was no manufacturing facility in the South to produce them in any of the Confederate states. Powder supplies in Florida were so low that, in April 1861, General John B. Grayson warned President Jefferson Davis in Richmond:

As sure as the sun rises, unless cannon, powder, etc., be sent to Florida in the next thirty days, she will fall into the hands of the North. Nothing human can prevent it.

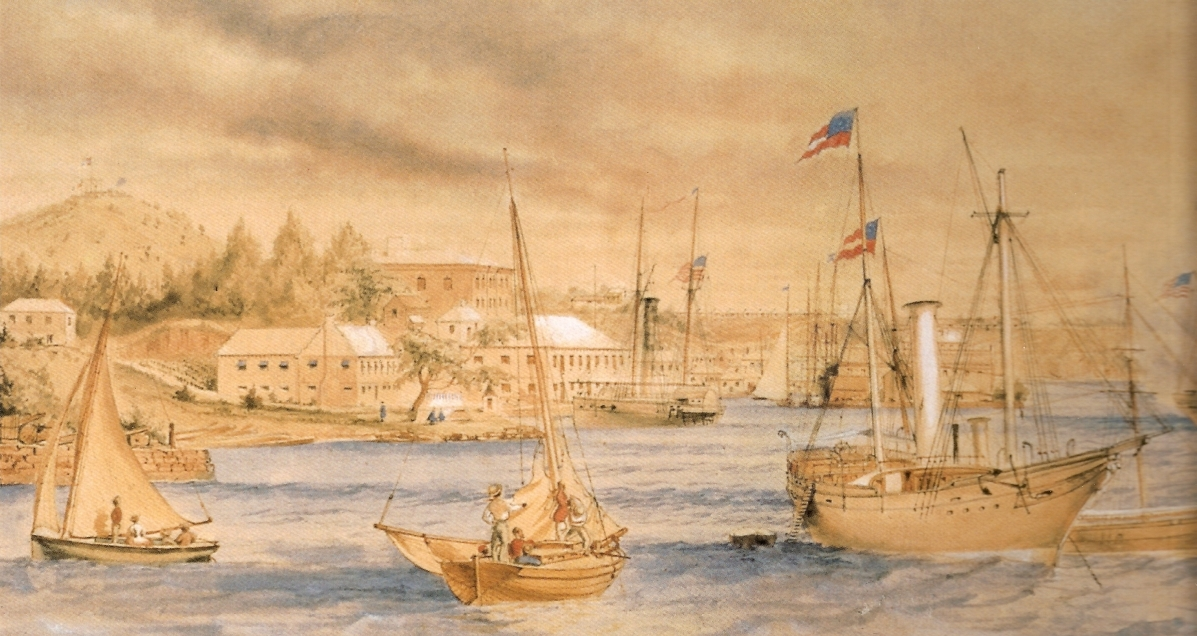
A Confederate blockade runner at anchor at St. George's, Bermuda

Every military center in the South urgently requested ordnance and supplies from Richmond. Because of the incursions of the Union Army, the Confederate Navy had limited coal, with the only domestic sources being located in North Carolina and Alabama.

The well-funded Importing and Exporting Company of Georgia was founded in 1863 by Gazaway Bugg Lamar, a Wall Street banker who had returned to his native Georgia at the outbreak of hostilities.

At this time, the Confederate government depended almost entirely on privately owned commercial ships used as blockade runners. However, the leaders of the Confederacy had enough foresight to realize that the federation needed its own vessels to bring in supplies. Acting for the Confederate Navy Department, James Dunwoody Bulloch began procuring vessels in Europe, most notably the CSS Atlanta. It reached Savannah, Georgia carrying ten thousand Enfield rifles, a million cartridges, two million percussion caps, and 400 barrels of gunpowder, along with swords, revolvers, and other military supplies.

In 1862, because of the Confederate embargo on cotton, more than 75% of textile workers in Britain were either unemployed or working fewer hours. This forced Britain to turn to other nations, like Egypt and India, for badly needed cotton. The Confederate government, in dire need of munitions and other supplies subsequently lifted their embargo on cotton and began selling it at reduced prices to win back British trading.

Late in 1863 the Confederate government began selling cotton to various buyers in Europe, especially Britain, while it also passed a law requiring blockade runners to reserve one-third of their cargo space for shipping cotton. Because of the small cargo capacity of blockade runners, exports of Confederate cotton still fell by 95 percent from pre-war levels. This also dramatically reduced the import of salt, vital for preserving meat and tanning leather, which had previously been ballast on returning cargo ships.

=== Central figures ===
Coordinating the business affairs of the C.S.A. with shipbuilders, purchasing agents, suppliers, and shippers in Liverpool, Nassau, Wilmington and other ports involved the concerted efforts of a number of notable men and shipping firms. Foremost in this effort were Major Josiah C. Gorgas and George Trenholm of Fraser, Trenholm and Company – who worked closely with Gorgas, the Confederate Naval Secretary, and other agents.

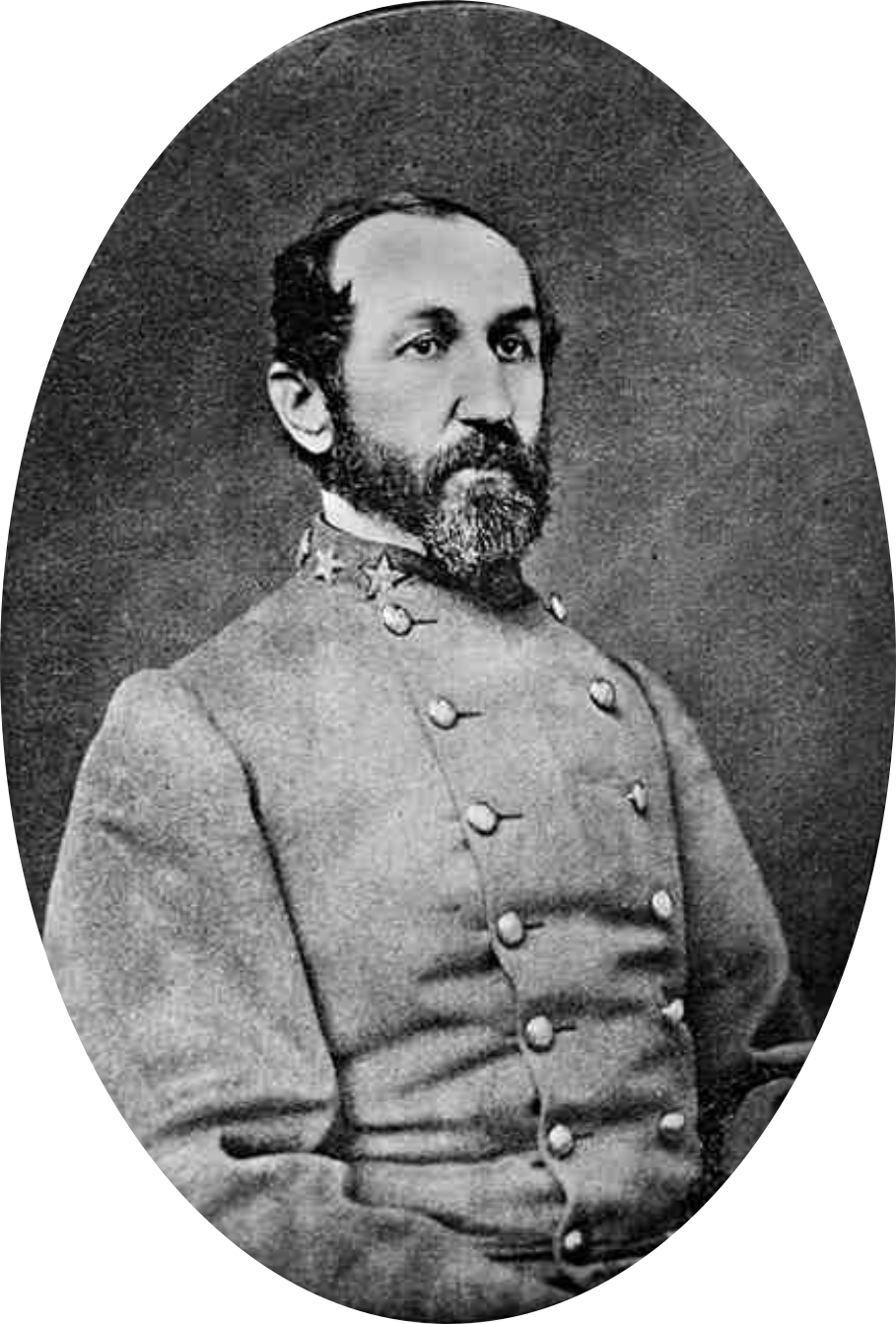
Major Josiah C. Gorgas

==== Josiah C. Gorgas ====
Blockade runners became the chief means to supply the Confederacy. Major Josiah Gorgas, a West Point graduate of 1841, prior to the war had worked in the United States Ordnance Bureau and had served in nearly every arsenal in the nation. While working in the South, he became sympathetic to the secessionist movement. He eventually sided with the Confederacy, becoming the head of the Confederate Ordnance Bureau. Gorgas liaised with Charles Prioleau, who headed Trenholm's Liverpool office, arranging for the shipping of arms and other supplies. Most of the arms sent to the Confederacy departed from Liverpool. During the summer of 1861, Gorgas stockpiled supplies and prepared his first load of cargo, while Trenholm's company procured a suitable ship for the voyage. A 1,200-ton iron-hulled steamer, the Bermuda, was chosen to make the voyage.

==== Caleb Huse ====
To coordinate the business and the buying of weapons and supplies in England, Gorgas relied on agents Captain Caleb Huse and Major Edward C. Anderson. Under Gorgas' direction, Huse, a West Point graduate, recently commissioned a captain in the newly established Confederate army, served as an arms procurement agent and purchasing specialist, well known for his successful acquisition of weapons contracts with various European nations. These included Great Britain and Austria, among others. Anderson was sent along to aid Huse and check on his activity.

Huse arranged the sale and procurement of rifles and other ordnance from the London Armoury Company, which became the chief supplier of arms to the Confederacy throughout the war. By February 1863, the Armoury had shipped more than 70,000 rifles to the Confederacy. Huse owned several seagoing steamers used in blockade running and made several trips to Europe and back aboard these vessels.

In April 1861, Huse departed the South for New York, where he met with James Welsman of Trenholm Brothers, and received funds for his trip to England. After stopping at Portland, Maine, he sailed to Liverpool, arriving there on May 10, 1861. He began to search the market for Enfield rifles, a weapon comparable to the popular Springfield rifle used by the Union Army. Because the market was already flooded with orders, Huse finally sought out S. Isaac, Campbell & Company to purchase the supplies needed. His purchase did not reach the Confederacy until later that summer. In the meantime, Huse continued to search for sellers of military supplies.

While in Europe Huse represented the Confederate War Dept. and Ordnance Bureau throughout the entire war; he arranged for credit to be extended when funds were short. These men also acted as liaisons with Charles Prioleau of Fraser, Trenholm & Co. in Liverpool. Through him they would procure the vessels and arrange for the shipment of goods to the Confederacy. Bulloch worked in close correspondence with Confederate Secretary of the Navy Stephen Mallory in the procurement of several British-made blockade-running vessels.

==== James Dunwoody Bulloch ====
James Dunwoody Bulloch, (at left) shown with his half-brother Irvine Stephens Bulloch, was the youngest officer on the CSS Alabama. They were the uncles of Theodore Roosevelt. Photo taken about 1865.

The half-brother of noted C.S.N. officer Irvine Bulloch, James Dunwoody Bulloch was the Confederacy's chief foreign agent in Great Britain. Inside two months after the attack on Fort Sumter, Bulloch arrived at Liverpool, where he established his base of operations. As his first order of business, he made contact with Confederate Commissioners, Hon. William Yancey and Hon. Dudley Mann, in London. After being welcomed they discussed the diplomatic situation, since they had not been officially received by the British Secretary of State for Foreign Affairs – as the Confederate government had not permanently established themselves as an independent foreign power. Bulloch then established a relationship with the shipping firm of Fraser, Trenholm & Company, where he set up a conference with the Fraser-Trenholm officials who were the designated financial agents of the new Confederate government. They arranged for the buying and selling of cotton, being ultimately responsible for shipping approximately seven-eighths of all the cotton exported from the Southern states during the war. Bulloch also arranged for the construction and purchase of the Florida, the Alabama and the Shenandoah.

In 1863 Bulloch contracted with the Laird shipyard for the construction of two ironclad rams to be used against the Union blockade. However, if it could be proven that the contract (or commission) for building these ships was in violation of Britain's neutrality law, the ships could be seized. The Union's minister to Britain, Charles F. Adams, tried to do just that; but he could only gather circumstantial evidence, as Bulloch went to great lengths to conceal his movements. Adams threatened the British government with reprisal: that if the rams escaped, the United States would consider it an act of war. After further consideration, British authorities seized the two vessels and from that point on kept a close watch on Bulloch and other such propositions made by the Confederate government, forcing C.S.A. officials to turn to the French for future commissions. Following that turn of events Bulloch then commissioned a shipbuilder in France to construct the Stonewall, another armored ram.

John Newland Maffitt

==== John Newland Maffitt ====
On April 11, 1862, George W. Randolph, the new Confederate Secretary of War appointed John Newland Maffitt, an officer of the Confederate Navy and a notorious privateer with a long success record, to be the acting agent in Nassau for the Confederacy. Nassau was one of several offshore stopover points for shipments coming into or leaving the Confederate States. Maffitt's duties were broad. "You are authorized to take entire control of all vessels loaded with arms and munitions for the Confederate States." Maffitt's duties included selecting ports of entry and discharging and replacing officers and crews as needed. His only condition was that he first confer with Louis Heylinger, Confederate agent in Nassau. Maffitt would later be given command of the CSS Albemarle.

== Blockade runners ==
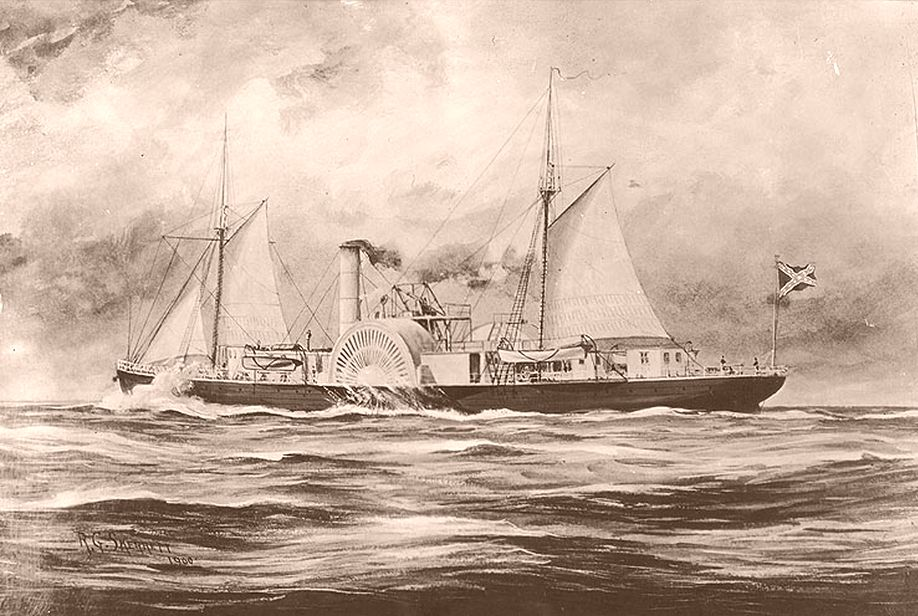
CSS Ella & Annie

The ships employed in blockade running were almost all privately owned, many of them built by the British who sought to maintain trade with the southern states. The Confederate government only had about eleven ships of its own that were employed in the blockade-running effort. Among the most famous blockade runners was the CSS Robert E. Lee, a Scottish-built iron-hulled steamer which was eventually captured by Union forces in 1863 and the privately owned SS Syren which made a record 33 successful runs through the Union blockade. The blockade runners had a specific function in the handling of cargoes headed for the Confederacy. Purchases of supplies made in England were first shipped to Nassau in the bottoms of British vessels, where the cargoes would be transferred to blockade runners, ships of lighter draft and greater speed. From Nassau they would make their way to ports in Wilmington, Charleston and Savannah. Lewis Heylinger of New Orleans was the agent and representative in Nassau for the Confederacy throughout the war. His job was to coordinate the transferring of cargoes arriving from England to the blockade runners and then arrange for shipping to the Confederacy.

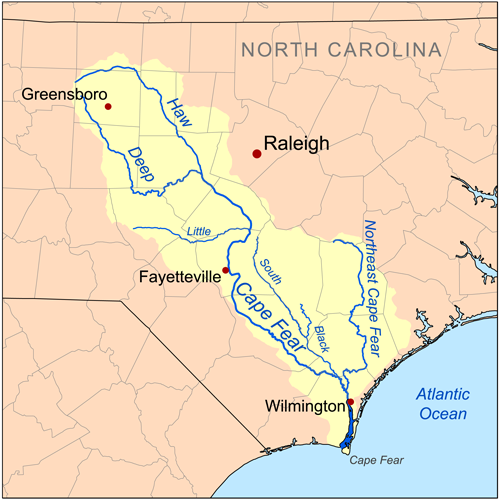
Wilmington on the Cape Fear River

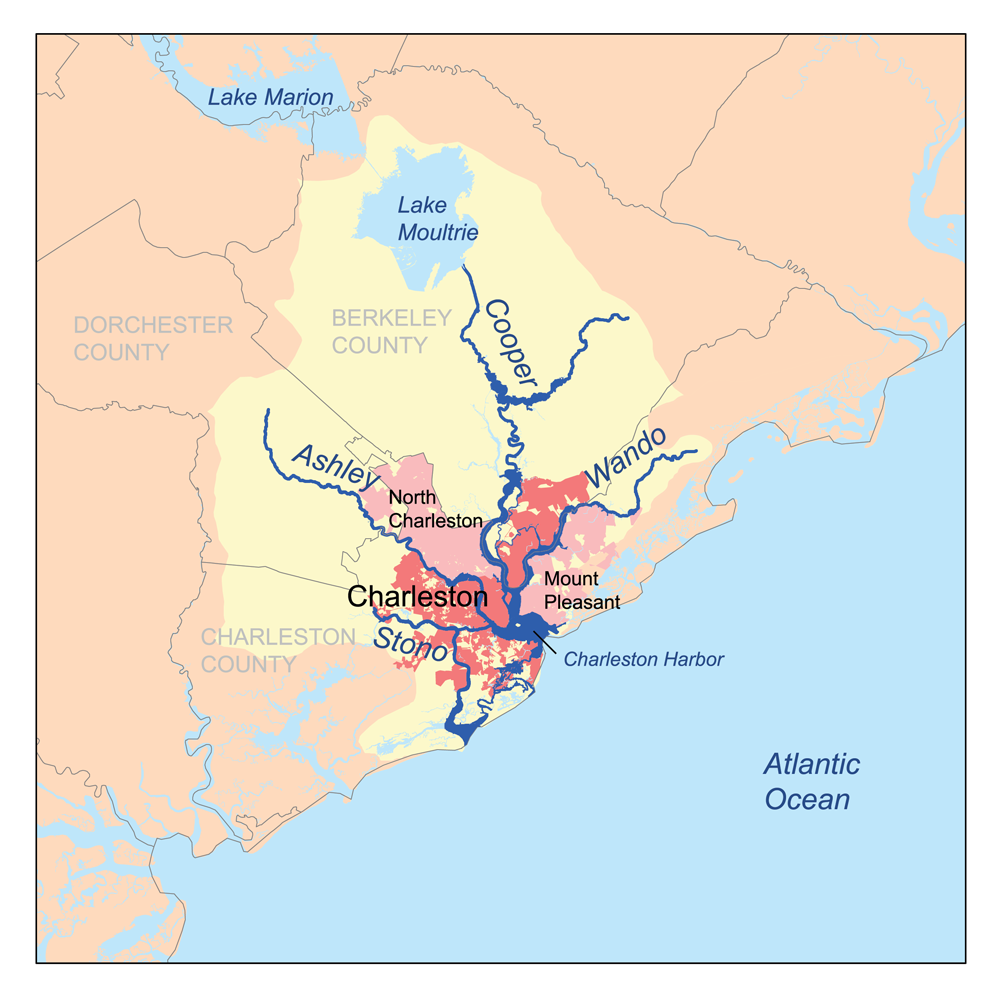
Charleston Harbor See also: First and Second Battles of Charleston Harbor

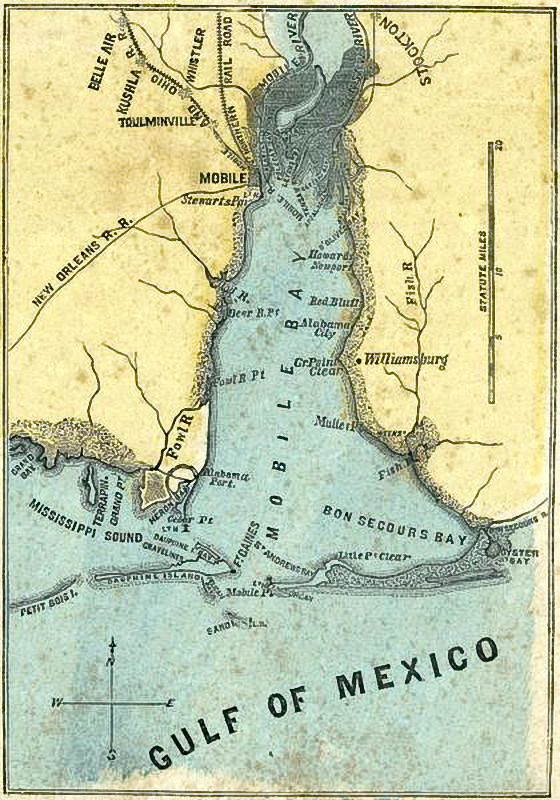
Mobile Bay

The first outbound blockade runner to elude the blockade made its way to Nassau, landing there on December 5, 1861. Blockade runners would typically export cotton to Nassau, where it would be stored, then transferred to a neutral ship and sent to England, usually Liverpool. By the end of the war, 397 ships sailed from the Confederacy to Nassau, and 588 went from Nassau to the Confederacy.

Because of the great bulk and weight involved with shipping cannons, arms and gunpowder, owners of the small blockade-running vessels instead preferred to ship luxury and other smaller items of less weight into Confederate ports. This began to compromise the purpose of the blockade runners' original mission, i.e., supplying the Confederate Army. Subsequently, the Confederacy enacted regulations in February 1864, limiting the importation of luxury items, which however, were often evaded.

Oftentimes vessels departing from various ports in Bermuda ran to Wilmington and Charleston, from where most of the supplies were then shipped by rail to Augusta, the main depot for the Western armies, or to Richmond, the main eastern depot. Imports shipped to Galveston were also sent by rail to Houston. By 1863 Union attacks along the Confederate coast made running the blockade more difficult, forcing blockade runners to use other ports besides those at Wilmington, Charleston and Savannah. After the capture of New Orleans in 1862 the ports in Mobile and Galveston were the next choice, used in conjunction with Havana as a transfer point.

Unlike Charleston and Savannah, Wilmington was the central depot for blockade runners throughout most of the Civil War. Between October 1864 and January 1865, 8,632,000 pounds of meat, 1,507,000 pounds of lead, 1,933,000 pounds of saltpeter, 546,000 pairs of shoes, 316,000 pairs of blankets, half a million pounds of coffee, 69,000 rifles, and 43 cannon reached the Confederates through the port of Wilmington alone, while cotton sufficient to pay for these purchases was exported. When Wilmington fell in February 1865, the Confederacy's major supply line was cut, and Union victory was assured.

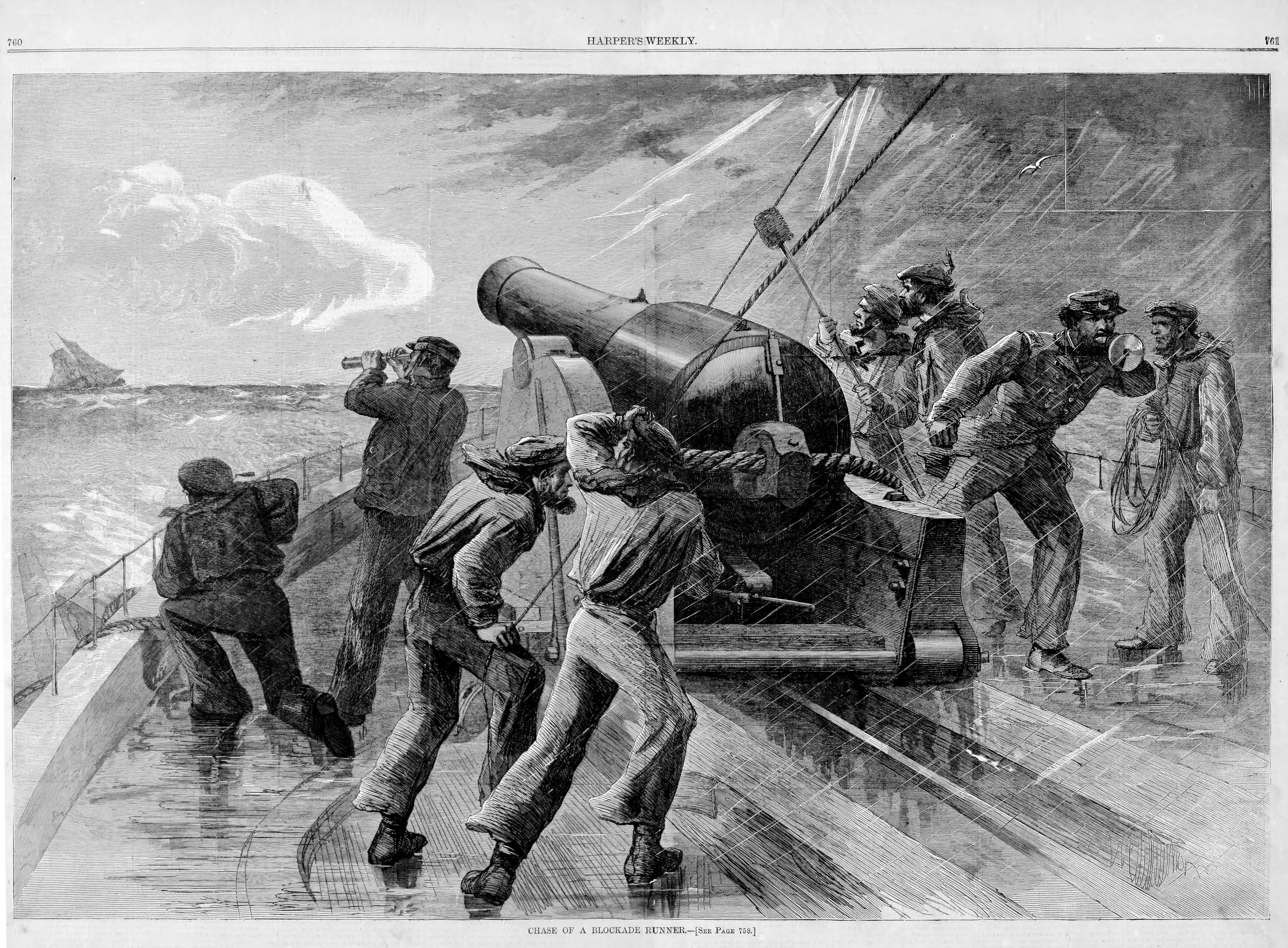
"Chase of a Blockade Runner" (Harper's Weekly, November 26, 1864)

The Union made massive repeated attempts to stop the ships coming and going; eventually they did capture most of the ships. The blockade runners were built for speed. This was made plainly evident on December 23, 1864, when the largest Union fleet ever to assemble in the Atlantic attacked Fort Fisher, a massive fortification protecting the Cape Fear River entrance and Wilmington. While the fleet of 125 Men-of-war and transports were blockading the harbor, an incoming blockade runner passed through the fleet and took refuge upriver. The last blockade runner to make its way into Wilmington's port was the SS Wild Rover, on January 5, 1865. The fort was attacked a second time on January 13, and after a two-day siege it was captured on January 15 by the Union Army and Navy. Several blockade runners previously docked upriver managed to escape in the midst of the battle. Prior to the capture of the fort, Rear Admiral Porter, in command of the eastern flotilla, wrote to the war department:

"Blockade running seems almost as brisk as ever, the new class of blockade runners are very fast and sometimes come in and play around our vessels, they are built entirely for speed."

Eventually, Union attacks were also being made along the Bermuda coast, where Union man-of-war ships often seized neutral vessels and their cargoes. This outraged Lewis Heyliger, who was appointed by the Treasury of the Confederacy as head of the "depository" of Confederate funds in Nassau, Bahamas. Among his chief duties was to coordinate shipments of cotton and tobacco to England, and to organize and conduct the purchase of incoming cargoes.

=== The first blockade runners ===
Soon after Lincoln's proclamation, lighter vessels specifically designed to evade and outrun Union ships on blockade patrol, called blockade runners, were being produced. Many of the vessels were built in British shipyards and were designed to be used as fast transports for dispatch purposes, carrying important (often business) correspondence and light cargoes. Inbound vessels carried general mail and other correspondence and typically imported firearms, military ordnance, and paper, a simple commodity that was scarce throughout the agrarian south and badly needed by the Confederate government and general population. One use of paper was for an 1862 postage stamp, Scott catalogue CSA 6. Both the paper and printing plates were brought through the blockade, and enough were printed to make this a very common issue.

The Confederate Navy had a small number of its own seagoing ships used in blockade-running efforts, but most of the ships employed were privately owned vessels. Many of these ships were built and designed in Britain by various shipping companies and other interested parties for the express purpose of getting through the blockades quickly, notably in Glasgow. The ships that emerged from this enterprise were all side-wheel steamers, long and narrow vessels with a shallow draft allowing them to cut through the water more efficiently. Many were painted a dark gray color so they would blend in better with the backdrop of the night sea. A few ships were painted white to help obscure their profile against the daytime horizon. While crossing great expanses of ocean, the steamers would burn normal coal that produced a dark smoke but when they were about to approach land, they would often switch to burning a smokeless anthracite coal which greatly reduced their profile along the horizon. Sometimes these ships would use cotton soaked in turpentine as fuel as it gave off little smoke and produced intense heat that resulted in a marked increase in ship's speed.

The first vessel to run the blockade from Britain was the SS Fingal, Commanded by James D. Bulloch. The first Confederate blockade runner from America bound for England left Charleston and arrived at Nassau on December 5, 1861, with 144 bales of cotton. The trip between Charleston and Nassau took a first-class steamer approximately 48 hours to complete, taking another three days to unload and load again and to recoal.

== Notable blockade runners ==
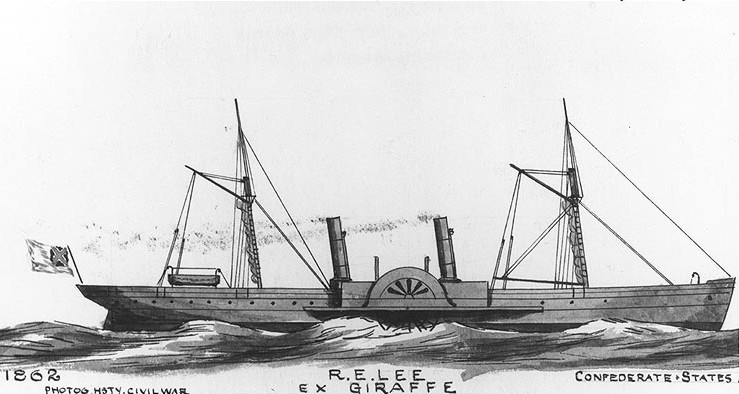
CSS Robert E. Lee

Among the notable blockade runners were privately owned vessels like the SS Syren, a 169-foot (52 m) steel-hulled sidewheel steamer that made a record 33 successful runs through the Union blockade. and the CSS Advance that completed more than 20 successful runs before being captured. After its capture it was renamed USS Advance in 1864 and USS Frolic in 1865.

The first ship to evade the Union blockade was the A and A, a bark from Belfast, making its way from Charleston harbor. The General Parkhill, a British ship built in Liverpool, England, was the first blockade runner to be captured by the USS Niagara also at Charleston harbor. Clyde steamers were particularly suitable, and many were sold to Confederate agents.

Screw-driven steamers:

- SS Fingal (1861), (Note: Not to be confused with SS Fingal (1923)) (CSS Atlanta ironclad 1862–63). An iron merchant screw-steamer of 462 tons built by J & G Thomson at Govan, Scotland, 1861. Sold to John Low for the Confederate States Navy. Fingal was the last blockade runner to enter Savannah, GA, November 1861, with a large cargo of Enfield rifles, cannon and military supplies. After two unsuccessful attempts to break out of the blockade, she was converted into the ironclad CSS Atlanta (1862–1863). On its second sortie she was outdueled by two Union monitors, captured and put into service on the James River as the ironclad USS Atlanta.
- CSS Florida (1862), (cruiser 1862–64). Commissioned August 17, 1862, at Green Cay, Bahamas. Commanded by Capt. John Newland Maffitt. Sailed to Cardenas and Havana, Cuba, before making the famous run into Mobile Bay, Alabama, on September 4, 1862.
- SS Laurel (1864). A 207-foot iron-hull single-screw steamer, commanded by Lt. John F. Ramsey, CSN, made 1 successful blockade run as CSS vessel, owned by the CSA, renamed Confederate States and survived the war.

Side-wheel steamers:

- CSS Advance (1863–64), also A.D. Vance. A side-wheel steamer, built at Greenock, Scotland, in 1862, purchased by the CSA (North Carolina) under the name Lord Clyde in 1863, renamed Advance for running Union blockade. Vessel made 20 blockade runs before its capture on September 10, 1864, by USS Santiago de Cuba off Wilmington, North Carolina. Renamed USS Frolic in 1865.
- CS Eagle, a Spofford & Tileston steamship.
- CSS Flamingo, three stacked, sloop-rigged steamer, Confederate Navy owned. One of the largest types of blockade-running vessels operating out of ports in England that carried high priority cargoes.
- CSS Kate (1861–1862). A 165-foot wooden sidewheel steamer of 477 tons, made 20 successful blockade runs. Built in New York and purchased by John Fraser & Co, it eventually ran aground at Cape Fear, November 18, 1862.
- SS Lynx (1861–1864), a 220-foot steel hull sidewheel steamer, made 9 successful blockade runs, owned by Fraser Trenholm & Co., destroyed trying to leave Wilmington, September 25, 1864.
- CSS Robert E. Lee (1862–1863). A schooner-rigged, iron-hulled, paddle-steamer of the Confederate Navy, used as a blockade runner, commanded by Lieutenant Richard H. Gayle. Captured November 9, 1863, off the coast of North Carolina by USS James Adger and USS Iron Age.
- Scottish Chief (1861–1864), a steamer owned and captained by Tampa, Florida mayor James McKay which made several runs carrying Florida cattle and cotton from Tampa to Spanish Cuba through the Union blockade of Tampa Bay. Burned at its moorings on the Hillsborough River during the Battle of Fort Brooke, a Union raid with the primary objective of destroying the Chief.
- SS Syren (1863–1865), a privately owned iron-hulled sidewheel steamer, built at Greenwich, Kent, England, in 1863 for a blockade runner. Owned by the Charleston Importing and Exporting Company, she made her first run on November 5, 1863, running supplies from Nassau to Wilmington. The Syren completed a record 33 runs through the blockade, the most of any blockade runner. Her career as a blockade runner came to an end when the Syren, along with the other steamers Celt, Deer and Lady Davis, were captured in Charleston harbor at the Ashley River, where she had successfully run in through the blockade the night before, on February 18, 1865.
- SS Tristram Shandy (1864), an iron-hulled sidewheel steamer completed in 1864 at Greenock, Scotland, used as a blockade runner, captured May 15, 1864 by the USS Kansas.

Less notable Blockade Runners
- CSS Lady Sterling was a Confederate blockade runner built by James Ash at Cubitt Town, London in 1864. She was captured by Union forces of Wilmington on October 28, 1864. She was badly damaged and captured by the United States Navy on October 28, 1864, off Wilmington, North Carolina.
- Denbigh
- SS West Indian
- Schooner Break O' Day
- Wild Rover
- SS Will of the Wisp Ran ashore on February 3, 1865, while trying to get into Galveston.
- CS Lilian, captured by USS Keystone State and USS Gettysburg, Aug 24, 1864
- Fannie, brought yellow fever to St. George from June to October 1864
- Leopard, 8 successful runs.
- CS Julia
- Flora
- CSS Cornubia
- City of Petersburg
- Old Daminion
- Herald
- SS Princess Royal, A 774 gross ton screw steam gunboat, was built at Glasgow, Scotland, in 1861, ran aground and captured entering Charleston January 29, 1863.
- General Beauregard, owned by Fraser, Trenholm & Co.
- Nuestra Senora del Reglo re-flagged as USS Commodore Hull.
- Lightening (schooner), captured off Georgia March 9, 1863.
- Volant (schooner), captured July 2, 1862.
- SS Amelia, captured by USS Union, June 1861.
- CSS Calhoun, captured January 23, 1862.
- Hebe (1863 ship)
- SS Theodora
- Agnes E. Fry The Agnes E. Fry was a US Confederate blockade runner built on the River Clyde in Scotland in 1864. She was scuttled near the mouth of the Cape Fear River, Oak Island, North Carolina sometime around January, 1865. The ship's wreckage may have been found by sonar on February 27, 2016.

This list is by no means complete. Hundreds of ships attempted to run the blockade throughout most of the Civil War.

== See also ==
- Bahamas in the American Civil War
- Bibliography of early American naval history § American Civil War
- Bibliography of the American Civil War § Naval history
- Postage stamps and postal history of the Confederate States § Blockade mail
- List of ships captured in the 19th century § American Civil War
- List of ships of the Confederate States Navy
- Prize (law)
- Wilmington, North Carolina in the American Civil War

== Bibliography ==
=== Secondary sources ===
- Bennett, Frank M. (1897). The Steam Navy of the United States (PDF). Warren & Company Publishers, Philadelphia. 979 pages.
- Bostick, Douglas W. (2010). Charleston Under Siege: The Impregnable City. The History Press, Charleston, South Carolina, 158 pages. ISBN 978-1-5962-9757-9.
- Boyd, Steven R. (2010). Patriotic Envelopes of the Civil War: The Iconography of Union and Confederate Covers. LSU Press. p. 169. ISBN 978-0-8071-3796-3.
- Browning, Robert M. Jr. (1993). From Cape Charles to Cape Fear. The North Atlantic Blockading Squadron during the Civil War. University of Alabama Press, 472 pages. ISBN 978-0-8173-0679-3.
- Cochran, Hamilton (1958). Blockade Runners of the Confederacy. Bobbs-Merrill; Original, Univ. California, 350 pages.
- Dept U.S. Navy. Ships of the Confederate States. Department Of The Navy – Naval Historical Center.
- Calore, Paul (2002). Naval Campaigns of the Civil War. McFarland, 232 pages. ISBN 978-0-7864-8032-6.
- Canney, Donald L. (1998). Lincoln's Navy: The Ships, Men and Organization, 1861–65. Naval Institute Press. pp. 232. ISBN 978-1-5575-0519-4. "screw steamer."
- Carr, Dawson (1988). Gray Phantoms of the Cape Fear: Running the Civil War Blockade. John F. Blair, Publisher. 227 pages. ISBN 978-0-8958-7552-5.
- Confederate Congress, 1861–1865 (1905). Journal of the Congress of the Confederate States of America, 1861–1865. U.S. Government Printing Office, 917 pages. Washington.
- Cooper, William J. (2001). Jefferson Davis, American. Random House Digital, Inc, 848 pages. ISBN 0-394-56916-4.
- Coulter, Ellis Merton (1950) [1994 reprint]. The Confederate States of America, 1861–1865 (7th printing ed.). Louisiana State University Press. p. 644. ISBN 0-8071-0007-2.
- Donald, David Herbert (1996). Lincoln. Simon and Schuster, New York. ISBN 978-0-6848-2535-9. 714 pages.
- Ellis, John E. "Confederate States Navy, Museum, Library & Research Institute". Confederate States Navy Research Library, Mobile, Alabama.
- Evans, Clement Anselm (1899). Confederate military history: a library of Confederate States history, Volume 12. Confederate publishing company. 403 pages.
- Frajola, Richard (2011). "Tales from the Blockade" (PDF). Richard Frajola. p. 16. Archived from the original (PDF) on March 16, 2012.
- Heidler, David Stephen & Jeanne T.; Coles, David J. (2002). Encyclopedia of the American Civil War: A Political, Social, and Military History. W. W. Norton & Company, New York. p. 2733. ISBN 978-0-3930-4758-5.
- Hosmer, James Kendall (1913). The American Civil War, Volume 2. Harper & Brothers Publishers, New York, London. pp. 351.
- Jones, Howard (1992). Union in Peril: The Crisis Over British Intervention in the Civil War. University of North Carolina Press Press. p. 300. ISBN 9780807820483.
- Katcher, Philip R. N. (2003). The Army of Northern Virginia: Lee's Army in the American Civil War, 1861–1865. Fitzroy Dearborn, New York. p. 352. ISBN 1-57958-331-8.
- Konstam, Angus; Bryan, Tony (2004). Confederate Blockade Runner 1861–65. Osprey Publishing, Wisconsin. p. 48. ISBN 978-1-8417-6636-2.
- MacDonald, John (2009). The Historical Atlas of the Civil War. Chartwell Books, New York. p. 400. ISBN 9780785827030.
- McNeil, Jim (2003). Masters of the Shoals: Tales of the Cape Fear Pilots Who Ran the Union Blockade. Da Capo Press. p. 188. ISBN 0-306-81280-0.
- McPherson, James M. (1988). Battle Cry of Freedom: The Civil War Era. New York: Oxford University Press. ISBN 0-19-503863-0.
- McPherson, James M., War on the Waters: The Union & Confederate Navies, 1861–1865 University of North Carolina Press, 2012, ISBN 978-0-8078-3588-3
- Mendelsohn, Adam (2012). Mark K. Bauman (ed.). "Samuel and Saul Isaac: International Jewish Arms Dealers, Blockade Runners, and Civil War Profiteers". Southern Jewish Historical Society. 15. Academia.edu: 41–79.
- Merli, Frank J. (1970). Great Britain and the Confederate Navy, 1861–1865. Indiana University Press, Indiana. p. 342. ISBN 0-253-21735-0.
- Nelson, Scott Reynolds; Sheriff, Carol (2007). A People at War: Civilians and Soldiers in America's Civil War. Oxford University Press. ISBN 978-0-1997-2597-7.
- Peters, Thelma Peterson (1939). The Bahamas and Blockade-running During the American Civil War. Duke University, North Carolina. p. 145. ISBN 1-57958-331-8.
- Richter, William L. (2004). Historical Dictionary of the Civil War and Reconstruction. Scarecrow Press, Maryland. p. 968. ISBN 9780810865631.
- Ripley, Warren (1970). Artillery and Ammunition of the Civil War. New York: Promontory Press. p. 384. ISBN 978-0-88394-003-7.
- Sandburg, Carl (1954). Abraham Lincoln. Galahad Books, New York. pp. 762. ISBN 0-88365-832-1.
- Shingleton, Royce (1994). High Seas Confederate: The Life and Times of John Newland Maffitt. University of South Carolina Press. pp. 160. ISBN 0-87249-986-3.
- Soley, James Russell (1885). The Blockade And The Cruisers. Digital Scanning Inc. p. 276. ISBN 1-58218-556-5.
- Spencer, Warren F. (1997). The Confederate Navy in Europe. University of Alabama Press Press. p. 288. ISBN 0-87249-986-3.
- Stark, James H. (1891). Stark's history and guide to the Bahama Islands. Duke University, North Carolina. p. 243.
- Stern, Phillip Van Doren (1962). The Confederate Navy. Doubleday & Company, Inc.
- Tans, Jochem H. (1995). The Hapless Anaconda: Union Blockade 1861–1865 (PDF). The Concord Review, Inc. p. 30. Archived from the original (PDF) on July 16, 2010.
- U.S. Congress, 1893–1894 (1895). Congressional edition, Volume 3267, Issue 1. U.S. Government Printing Office, Washington. p. 989.
- Wagner, Margaret E.; Gallagher, Gary W.; McPherson, James M. (2006). The Library of Congress Civil War Desk Reference. Simon and Schuster Inc., New York, 2006. p. 976. ISBN 9785878530880.
- Walske, Steven (2011). Civil War Blockade Mail: 1861–1865 (PDF). Steve Walske Exhibition at WESTPEX 2011. p. 32.
- Wilson, Walter E.; McKay, Gary L. (2012). James D. Bulloch: Secret Agent and Mastermind of the Confederate Navy. McFarland, North Carolina. p. 362. ISBN 978-0786466597.
- Wise, Stephen R. (1991). Lifeline of the Confederacy: Blockade Running During the Civil War. Univ of South Carolina Press. pp. 403. ISBN 0-87249-554-X.
- —— (1994). Gate of Hell: Campaign for Charleston, 1863. Univ of South Carolina Press. p. 312. ISBN 9780872499850.
- Wyllie, Arthur (2007). The Union Navy. Lulu.com. p. 668. ISBN 978-1-4303-2117-0.
- —— (2007). Confederate Officers. Lulu.com. p. 580. ISBN 978-0-615-17222-4.
- —— (2007). The Confederate States Navy. Lulu.com. p. 466. ISBN 978-0-615-17222-4.

=== Primary sources ===
- Bulloch, James Dunwody (1884). The secret service of the Confederate States in Europe, or, How the Confederate cruisers were equipped. G. P. Putnam's Sons, New York, 460 pages.
- Huse, Caleb (1904). The supplies for the Confederate Army : how they were obtained in Europe and how paid for. Boston: Press of T. R. Marvin & Son.
- Gorgas, Josiah (1995). Wiggins, Sarah Woolfolk (ed.). The Journals of Josiah Gorgas, 1857–1878. University of Alabama Press, 305 pages. ISBN 0-8071-0007-2.
- Scharf, J. Thomas (1887). History of the Confederate States Navy. New York: Rogers & Sherwood.
- Semmes, Raphael (1864). The Cruise of the Alabama and the Sumter. Massachusetts: Digital Scanning, Inc. p. 348. ISBN 1-58218-355-4.
- —— (1869). Memoirs of service afloat: during the war between the states. Kelly, Piet & Co., Baltimore. pp. 833. ISBN 1-58218-556-5.
- Wilkinson, John (1877). The Narrative of a Blockade-Runner. Sheldon & Company, New York. p. 252. ISBN 978-1287791980.
- Woods, Robert H.; Rush, Richard (1896). Official records of the Union and Confederate Navies in the War of the Rebellion. Government Printing Office, United States. Naval War Records Office, United States. p. 276. ISBN 1-58218-556-5. "under the direction of Hon. H.A. Herbert, Secretary of the Navy Office of Naval Records and Library"
