= Wilmington, North Carolina, in the American Civil War =

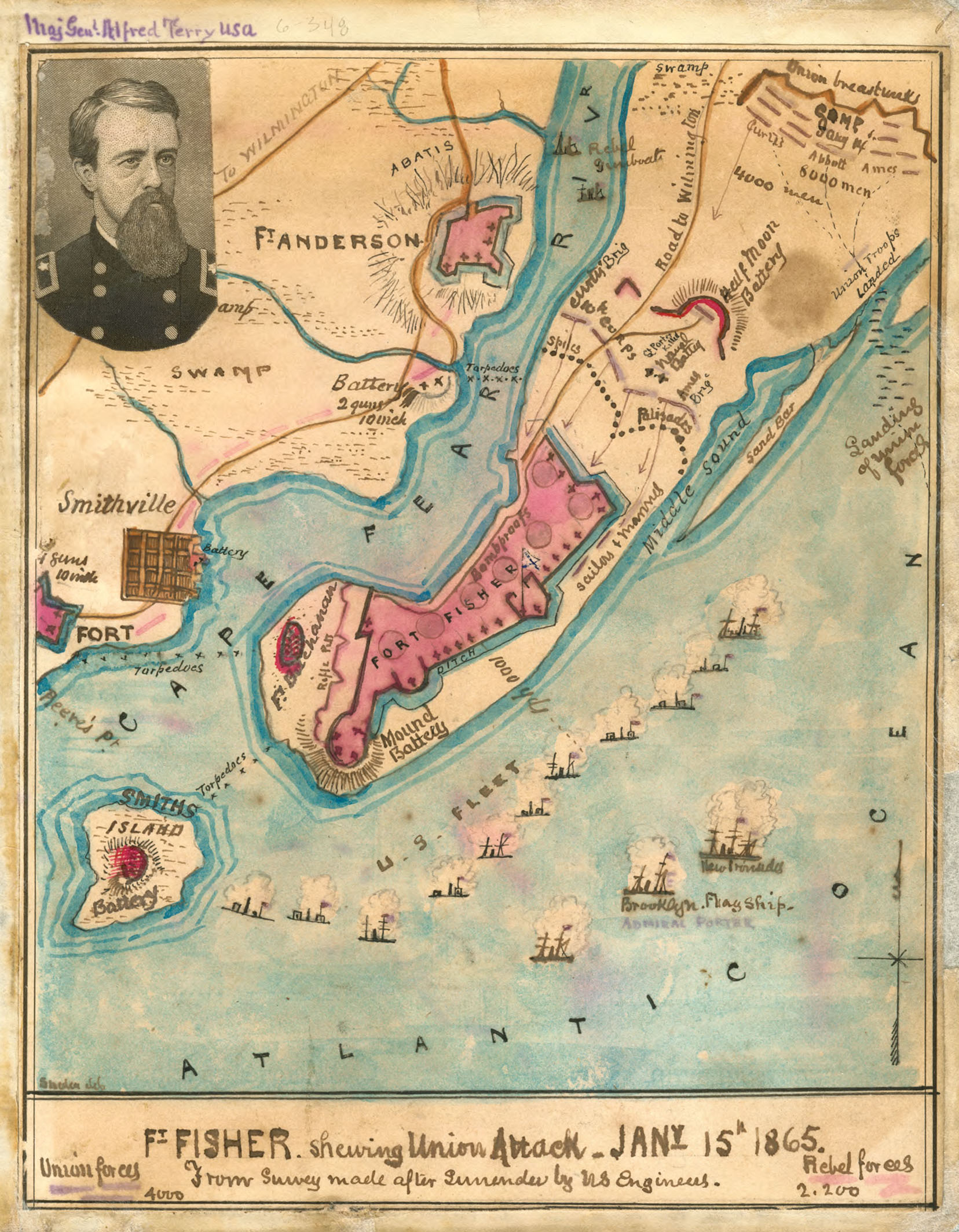
Union Attack on Fort Fisher, North Carolina, January 15, 1865

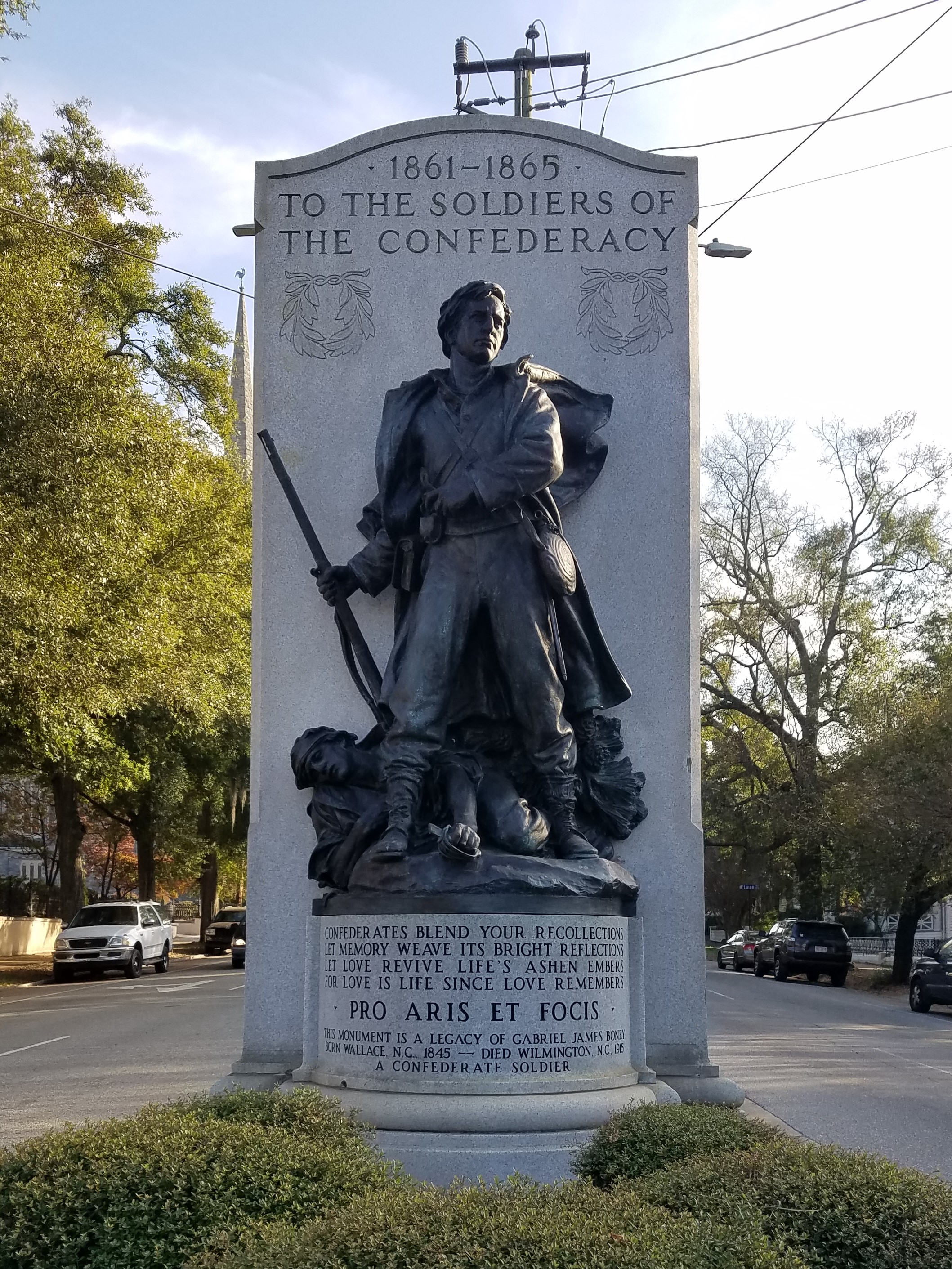
Confederate Monument in Wilmington

Wilmington, North Carolina, was a major port for the Confederacy during the American Civil War. It was the last port to fall to the Union Army (February 1865), completing its blockade of the Atlantic coast.

== Importance ==
Wilmington, located 30 miles upstream from the mouth of the Cape Fear River (which flows into the Atlantic Ocean), was among the Confederacy's more important cities. It ranked 13th in size in the CSA (although only 100th in the pre-war United States) with a population of 9,553 according to the 1860 census, making it nearly the same size as Atlanta, Georgia, at the time.

Wilmington was one of the most important points of entry for supplies for the entire Confederate States. Its port traded cotton and tobacco in exchange for foreign goods, such as munitions, clothing and foodstuffs. This nourished both the southern states in general and specifically General Robert E. Lee's forces in Virginia. The trade was based on steamer ships of British smugglers. These vessels were called blockade runners because they had to penetrate the Union's extensive and efficient blockade.

The blockade runners operated indirectly from British colonies–such as Bermuda, the Bahamas, or Nova Scotia. Along with vital supplies, the blockade runners brought foreign crews, who poured money into the local economy through bars, taverns, hotels, shops, and merchants. The town soon took on an international flavor not seen before the war.

In the summer of 1862, sailors arrived who were infected with yellow fever, which was endemic in the Caribbean. An epidemic soon paralyzed the once-thriving waterfront, as well as much of the city. Nearly 1,000 people contracted the disease, and more than 300 died before the illness had run its course and activity resumed.

After the fall of Norfolk, Virginia in May 1862, Wilmington's importance increased. It became the main Confederate port on the Atlantic Ocean. Along the Atlantic seashore, Wilmington's defenses were so sturdy that they were only surpassed by Charleston's fortifications in South Carolina. Wilmington resisted Federal occupation for a long time, mainly due to Fort Fisher.

Blockade running became an organized industry. The Crenshaw Company organized shipments of cotton from the interior of the Confederacy to Wilmington for smuggling through the blockade to England.

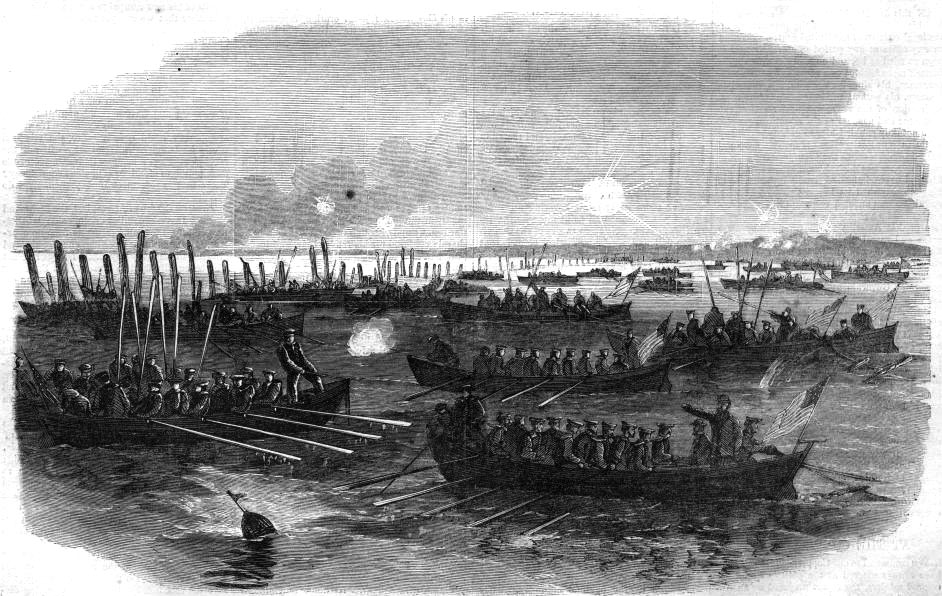
Admiral Porter's boats removing torpedoes and buoying the channel in Cape Fear River, March 1865

Wilmington was not captured by Union forces until February 22, 1865, approximately one month after the fall of Fort Fisher. The Battle of Wilmington consisted of a series of three small engagements near the Cape Fear River that led to the abandonment of the city by the Confederate forces under General Braxton Bragg. Before leaving, Bragg ordered the large quantities of bales of cotton and tobacco burned to prevent their falling into Union hands. Maj. Gen. Jacob D. Cox led the first Federal troops into Wilmington, and his forces occupied the city for the rest of the war.

As almost all the military action was at some distance from the city, a number of antebellum homes and other buildings have survived in downtown Wilmington.

== 1862 Escape of slaves ==
The outbreak of the Civil War brought danger to Wilmington in the form of crime, disease, threat of invasion, and "downright bawdiness." This prompted many slave owners to move inland, resulting in less supervision over those they were enslaving. During a rainy night on September 21, 1862, William B. Gould and George Price escaped with six other enslaved men (Note: They included Joseph Hall, Andrew Hall, John Mackey, Charles Gile, John Mitchell, and William Chance.) by rowing a small boat 28 nautical miles (52 km) down the Cape Fear River. They embarked on Orange Street, just four blocks from where Gould lived on Chestnut St. (Note: Nixon's slave quarters were on Chestnut Street in Wilmington, between Third and Fourth Streets.) Sentries were posted along the river, adding additional danger. The boat had a sail, but they did not raise it until they were out in the Atlantic for fear of being seen.

Just as the dawn was breaking on September 22, they rushed out into the Atlantic Ocean near Fort Caswell and hoisted their sail. There, the USS Cambridge of the Union blockade picked them up as contraband. Other ships in the blockade picked up two other boats containing friends of Gould in what may have been a coordinated effort. (Note: They include Virgil Richardson and Ben Greer who were picked up by the USS Penobscot and Thomas Cowan, Charles Mallet, and Frank Clinton who were rescued by the USS Monticello.) Though they had no way of knowing it, within an hour and a half of their rescue President Abraham Lincoln convened a meeting of his cabinet to finalize plans to issue the Emancipation Proclamation.

== See also ==
- Blockade runners of the American Civil War
- Wilmington massacre

== Works cited ==
- Gould IV, William B. (2002). Diary of a Contraband: The Civil War Passage of a Black Sailor (paperback ed.). Stanford University Press. ISBN 0-8047-4708-3.
- Yearns, W. Buck and Barret, John G., eds., North Carolina Civil War Documentary, 1980.
