= USS Commodore McDonough =

Gunboat of the United States Navy

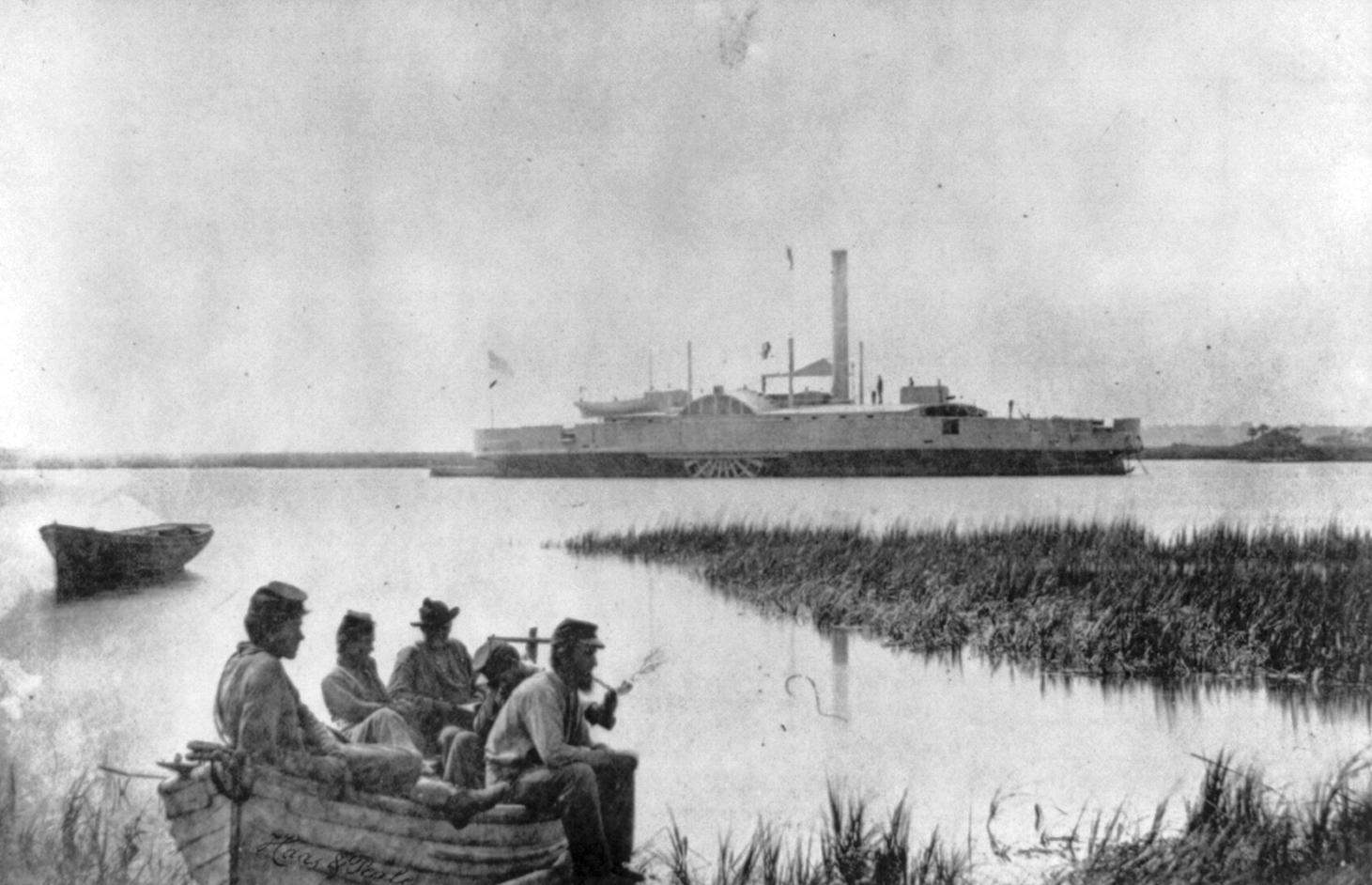
- USS Commodore McDonough (1862-1865) at Hilton Head, during the Civil War

History

United States
- Name: USS Commodore McDonough
- Laid down: date unknown
- Launched: date unknown
- Acquired: 5 August 1862 at New York City
- Commissioned: 24 November 1862
- Decommissioned: (sunk) 23 August 1865
- Fate: Foundered under tow, 23 August 1865

General characteristics
- Type: Gunboat
- Displacement: 532 long tons (541 t)
- Length: 154 ft (47 m) (estimated)
- Beam: 32 ft (9.8 m) (estimated)
- Draft: 8 ft 6 in (2.59 m)
- Propulsion: Steam engine; side-wheel propelled
- Speed: 8 kn (9.2 mph; 15 km/h)
- Complement: 75
- Armament: 1 × 9 in (230 mm) smoothbore gun, 1 × 20-pounder rifle, 4 × 24-pounder smoothbore guns

USS Commodore McDonough was a ferryboat acquired by the Union Navy during the American Civil War. Ferryboats were of great value, since – because of their flat bottom and shallow draft — they could navigate streams and shallow waters that other ships could not.

== Purchased in New York City in 1862 ==
Commodore McDonough — an armed, side-wheel ferry — was purchased on 5 August 1862 in New York City; fitted out at New York Navy Yard; and commissioned on 24 November 1862, Lieutenant Commander G. Bacon in command.

== Civil War service ==
=== Assigned to the South Atlantic Blockade ===
Commodore McDonough joined the South Atlantic Blockading Squadron at Port Royal, South Carolina on 11 December 1862. Throughout her service, she operated in South Carolina waters, primarily off Charleston, but often cruising up the many rivers of that coast to bombard shore installations, cover the landing of troops, engage Confederate batteries, and perform reconnaissance. In the continuing operations in Charleston Harbor, she frequently bombarded the forts protecting the city.

=== Foundered while under tow at war’s end ===
At the close of the war, she assisted in harbor clearance at Port Royal, South Carolina, and on 23 August 1865 — while under tow for New York — she foundered.
