= List of Confederate representatives from Kentucky =

This is a list of representatives from Kentucky to the Confederate Congress.

Representative	Lived	Party	District	Years served	Notes
Willis B. Machen	(1810–1893)	Nonpartisan	1st	1862–1865	Later served in US Senate
John W. Crockett, Jr.	(1818–1874)	Nonpartisan	2nd	1862–1864	
George W. Triplett	(1809–1894)	Nonpartisan	2nd	1864–1865	Later served as state court judge
Henry E. Read	(1824–1868)	Nonpartisan	3rd	1862–1865	
George W. Ewing	(1808–1888)	Nonpartisan	4th	1862–1865	
James Chrisman	(1818–1881)	Nonpartisan	5th	1862–1865	Previously served in US House
Theodore L. Burnett	(1829–1917)	Nonpartisan	6th	1862–1865	
Horatio W. Bruce	(1830–1903)	Nonpartisan	7th	1862–1865	Later served as state judge
George B. Hodge	(1828–1892)	Nonpartisan	8th	1862–1864	
Humphrey Marshall	(1812–1872)	Nonpartisan	8th	1864–1865	Previously served in US House
Eli M. Bruce	(1826–1866)	Nonpartisan	9th	1862–1865	
James W. Moore	(1818–1877)	Nonpartisan	10th	1862–1865	
Robert J. Breckinridge, Jr.	(1833–1915)	Nonpartisan	11th	1862–1864	
Benjamin F. Bradley	(1825–1897)	Nonpartisan	11th	1864–1865	
John M. Elliott	(1820–1879)	Nonpartisan	12th	1862–1865	Previously served in US House
