= List of Confederate representatives from Virginia =

This is a list of representatives from Virginia to the Confederate Congress.

Representative	Lived	Party	District	Years served	Notes
John B. Baldwin	(1820–1870)	Nonpartisan	11th	1862–1865	
Thomas S. Bocock	(1815–1891)	Nonpartisan	5th	1862–1865	Previously served in U.S. House
Alexander Boteler	(1815–1892)	Nonpartisan	10th	1862–1864	
John R. Chambliss, Sr.	(1809–1875)	Nonpartisan	2nd	1862–1864	
Charles F. Collier	(1817–1899)	Nonpartisan	4th	1862–1864	
Daniel C. DeJarnette, Sr.	(1822–1881)	Nonpartisan	8th	1862–1865	Previously served in U.S. House
David Funsten	(1819–1866)	Nonpartisan	9th	1863–1865	
Muscoe R. H. Garnett	(1821–1864)	Nonpartisan	1st	1862–1864	Previously served in U.S. House; Died in office
Thomas S. Gholson	(1808–1868)	Nonpartisan	4th	1864–1865	
John Goode, Jr.	(1829–1909)	Nonpartisan	6th	1862–1865	Later served in U.S. House
James P. Holcombe	(1820–1873)	Nonpartisan	7th	1862–1864	
Frederick W. M. Holliday	(1828–1899)	Nonpartisan	10th	1863–1865	
Albert G. Jenkins	(1830–1864)	Nonpartisan	14th	1862	Resigned
Robert Johnston	(1818–1885)	Nonpartisan	15th	1862–1865	
James Lyons	(1801–1882)	Nonpartisan	3rd	1862–1864	
LaFayette McMullen	(1805–1880)	Nonpartisan	13th	1864–1865	Previously served in U.S. House
Samuel A. Miller	(1819–1890)	Nonpartisan	14th	1863–1865	
Robert L. Montague	(1829–1880)	Nonpartisan	1st	1864–1865	
Walter Preston	(1819–1867)	Nonpartisan	13th	1862–1864	
Roger A. Pryor	(1828–1919)	Nonpartisan	4th	1862	Previously served in U.S. House
William C. Rives	(1793–1868)	Nonpartisan	7th	1864–1865	
Charles W. Russell	(1818–1867)	Nonpartisan	16th	1862–1865	
William Smith	(1797–1887)	Nonpartisan	9th	1862–1863	Previously served in U.S. House; Resigned
Walter R. Staples	(1826–1897)	Nonpartisan	12th	1862–1865	
Robert H. Whitfield	(1814–1868)	Nonpartisan	2nd	1864–1865	
Williams C. Wickham	(1820–1888)	Nonpartisan	3rd	1864–1865	
