= James Farrow =

James Farrow may refer to:

- James Farrow (politician)
- James Farrow (trader)
- James Farrow (known as Jake Farrow; born 1972), American television writer and actor
