= 1882 Arkansas gubernatorial election =

- September 4, 1882
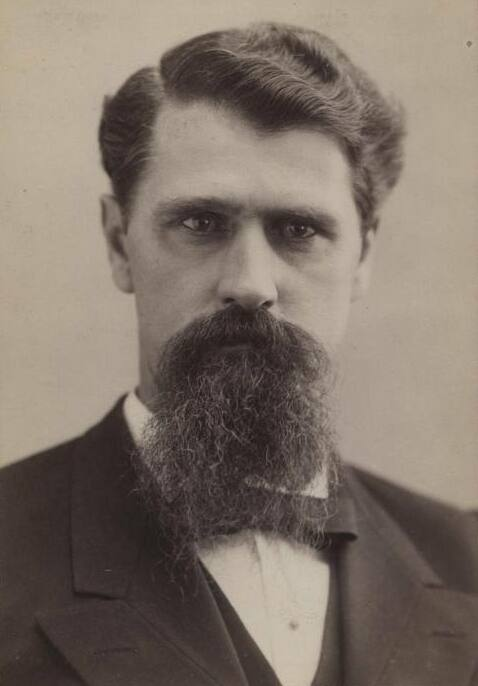

Nominee	James H. Berry	W. D. Slack	Rufus King Garland Jr.
Party	Democratic	Republican	Greenback
Popular vote	87,669	49,372	10,142
Percentage	59.57%	33.55%	6.89%
- County results Berry: 40–50% 50–60% 60–70% 70–80% 80–90% 90–100% Slack: 40–50% 50–60% 70–80% 80–90% Garland: 40–50%
Governor before election
Thomas James Churchill
Democratic
Elected Governor
James H. Berry
Democratic

The 1882 Arkansas gubernatorial election was held on September 4, 1882, in order to elect the Governor of Arkansas. Democratic nominee and former member and Speaker of the Arkansas House of Representatives James H. Berry defeated Republican nominee W. D. Slack and Greenback nominee and former representative from Arkansas in the Confederate Congress from the 2nd District Rufus King Garland Jr..

== General election ==
On election day, September 4, 1882, Democratic nominee James H. Berry won the election by a margin of 38,297 votes against his foremost opponent Republican nominee W. D. Slack, thereby retaining Democratic control over the office of Governor. Berry was sworn in as the 14th Governor of Arkansas on January 13, 1883.

=== Results ===
1882 Arkansas gubernatorial election
Party	Candidate	Votes	%
Democratic	James H. Berry	87,669	59.57
Republican	W. D. Slack	49,372	33.55
Greenback	Rufus King Garland Jr.	10,142	6.89
Total votes		147,183	100.00
Democratic hold			
