= James Leach =

James Leach may refer to:

- James Leach (composer) (bapt. 1761–1798), British composer
- James Leach (VC) (1892–1958), British Army Officer
- Jim Leach (1942–2024), American politician from Iowa
- James Dickson Leach (1912–1992), British businessman in Hong Kong
- James Madison Leach (1815–1891), Democratic politician from North Carolina
- James Darrell Leach, former Canadian ambassador to Mexico
- James Leach, British bass player with Sikth
- James Thomas Leach (1805–1883), Confederate politician
- Jimmie Leach (1922–2009), US Army officer
