= 2nd Confederate States Congress =

- Seal of the Confederate States

- Flag of the Confederate States (1865)

Type
- Type: Bicameral
- Houses: Senate; House of Representatives

History
- Founded: May 2, 1864
- Disbanded: March 18, 1865
- Preceded by: 1st

Leadership
- Senate President: Alexander H. Stephens
- Senate Pres. pro tem: R. M. T. Hunter
- House Speaker: Thomas S. Bocock

Meeting place
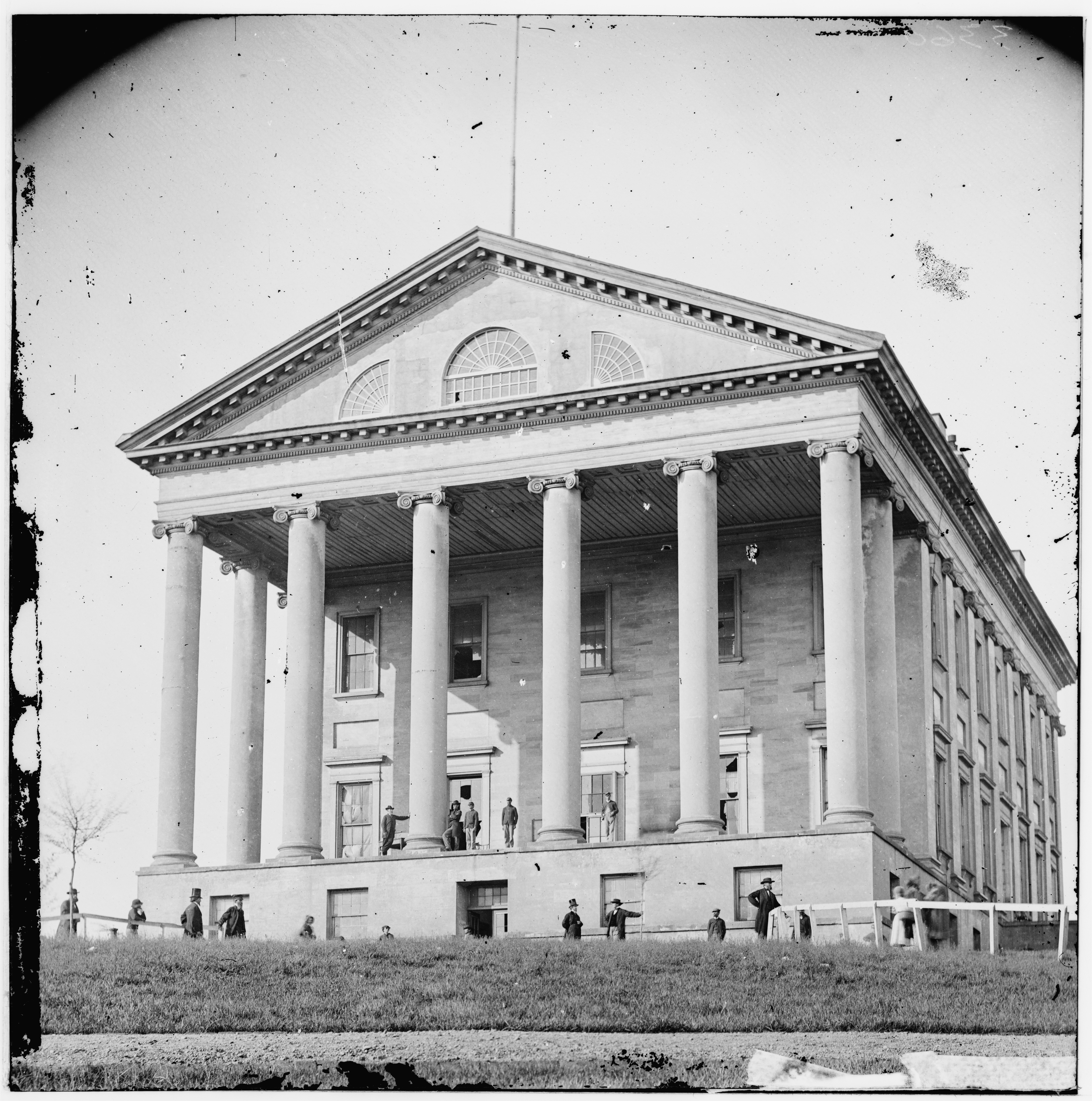
- Virginia State Capitol; Richmond, Virginia; Confederate States of America

Constitution
- Constitution of the Confederate States

The 2nd Confederate States Congress, consisting of the Confederate States Senate and the Confederate States House of Representatives, met from May 2, 1864, to March 18, 1865, during the last year of Jefferson Davis's presidency, at the Virginia State Capitol in Richmond, Virginia; the Confederacy's government effectively dissolved 16 days later, when it fled Richmond on April 3, 1865. Its members were elected in the 1863 congressional elections.

== Sessions ==
Held May 2, 1864, through March 18, 1865, at the Virginia State Capital in Richmond, Virginia. The term of the Second Congress was due to end on February 18, 1866. However, due to the defeat and dissolution of the Confederacy prior to that time, the Congress did not function after the end of its second and final session.

- 1st Session – May 2, 1864 to June 14, 1864
- 2nd Session – November 7, 1864 to March 18, 1865

== Leadership ==
=== Senate ===
Senate President

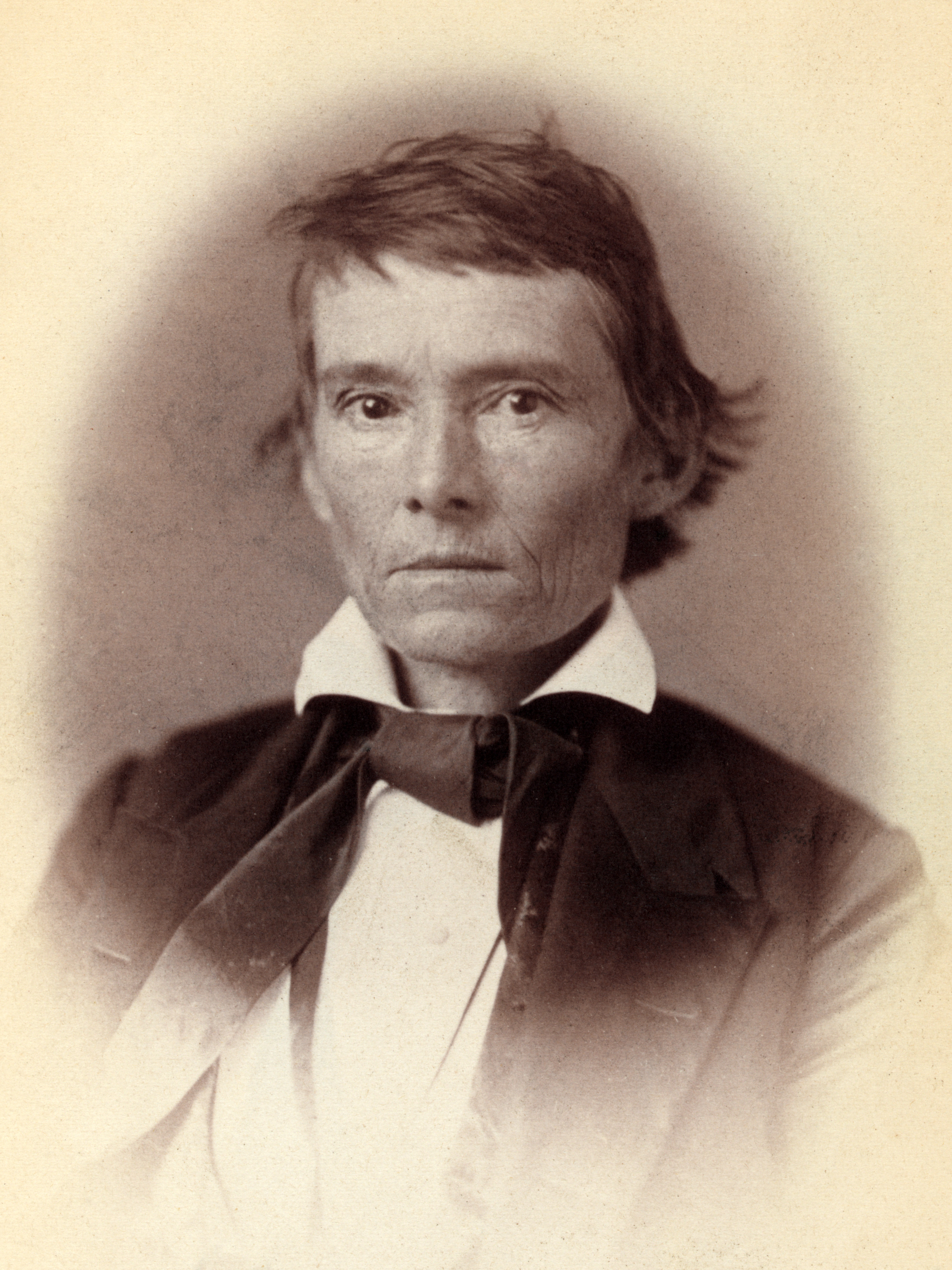
Alexander H. Stephens

President pro tempore

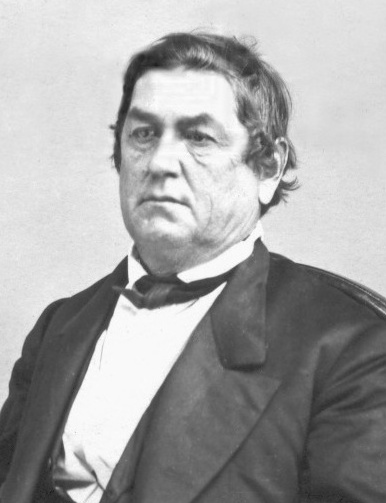
R. M. T. Hunter

- President: Alexander H. Stephens
- President pro tempore: R. M. T. Hunter

=== House ===
House Speaker

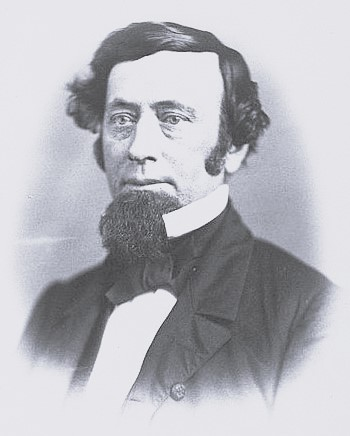
Thomas S. Bocock

- Speaker: Thomas S. Bocock

== Officers ==
=== Senate ===
- Secretary: James H. Nash, South Carolina
- Recording Clerk: John W. Anderson, Alabama
- Sergeant-at-Arms: Lafayette H. Fitzhugh, Kentucky
- Doorkeeper: James Page, North Carolina
- Assistant Doorkeeper: John Wadsworth, Georgia

=== House ===
- Clerk: Albert Reese Lamar, Georgia
- Assistant Clerk: David Louis Dalton, Alabama — sessions 3 and 4
- Doorkeeper: Robert Harrison Wynne, Alabama

== Members ==
=== Senate ===
X: served in the Senate of the First Congress (i.e. reelected or continued in office for this Second Congress).

Confederate States senators were elected by the state legislatures, or appointed by state governors to fill casual vacancies until the legislature elected a new senator. It was intended that one-third of the Senate would begin new six-year terms with each Congress after the first.

Preceding the names in the list below are Senate class numbers, which indicate the cycle of their terms. Senators of Class 1 were intended to serve a six-year term, starting with this Congress and expiring in 1870. Class 2 senators served what was intended to be a four-year term, due to end on the expiry of this Congress in 1866. Class 3 senators were meant to serve a six-year term, due to expire in 1868.

Alabama

- 3. Robert Jemison Jr. X
- 1. Richard Wilde Walker

Arkansas

- 1. Robert Ward Johnson X
- 3. Charles Burton Mitchel X (died September 20, 1864)
  - Augustus Hill Garland (took his seat on November 8, 1864 – Appointed to fill vacancy)

Florida

- 1. James McNair Baker X
- 2. Augustus Emmet Maxwell X

Georgia

- 3. Benjamin Harvey Hill X
- 1. Herschel Vespasian Johnson X

Kentucky

- 3. Henry Cornelius Burnett X
- 1. William Emmet Simms X

Louisiana

- 2. Thomas Jenkins Semmes X
- 3. Edward Sparrow X

Mississippi

- 2. Albert Gallatin Brown X
- 1. John William Clark Watson

Missouri

- 2. Waldo Porter Johnson X
- 1. (vacant caused by the inability of the Missouri legislature to meet and elect a senator)
  - George Graham Vest (took his seat on January 12, 1865 – Appointed to fill vacancy)

North Carolina

- 2. William Theophilus Dortch X
  - Thomas Samuel Ashe (elected to succeed Dortch in 1866 on December 3, 1864— never seated)
- 1. William Alexander Graham

South Carolina

- 2. Robert Woodward Barnwell X
- 3. James Lawrence Orr X

Tennessee

- 3. Landon Carter Haynes X
- 2. Gustavus Adolphus Henry Sr. X

Texas

- 3. William Simpson Oldham Sr. X
- 2. Louis Trezevant Wigfall X

Virginia

- 3. R. M. T. Hunter X
- 2. Allen Taylor Caperton X

=== House of Representatives ===
The names of representatives are preceded by their district numbers.

X: reelected

Alabama

- 1. Thomas Jefferson Foster X
- 2. William Russell Smith X
- 3. Congress refused to seat Representative-elect W. R. W. Cobb, an avowed Unionist; the district was not represented;
- 4. Marcus Henderson Cruikshank
- 5. Francis Strother Lyon X
- 6. William Parish Chilton Sr. X
- 7. David Clopton X
- 8. James L. Pugh X
- 9. James Shelton Dickinson

Arkansas

- 1. Felix Ives Batson X
- 2. Rufus King Garland Jr.
- 3. Augustus Hill Garland X (resigned to become CS senator November 8, 1864)
  - David Williamson Carroll (took his seat on January 11, 1865 – Elected to fill vacancy on October 24, 1864)
- 4. Thomas Burton Hanly X

Florida

- 1. Samuel St. George Rogers
- 2. Robert Benjamin Hilton X

Georgia

- 1. Julian Hartridge X
- 2. William Ephraim Smith
- 3. Mark Harden Blandford
- 4. Clifford Anderson
- 5. John Troup Shewmake
- 6. Joseph Hubbard Echols
- 7. James Milton Smith
- 8. George Nelson Lester
- 9. Hiram Parks Bell
- 10. Warren Akin Sr.

Kentucky

- 1. Willis Benson Machen X
- 2. George Washington Triplett
- 3. Henry English Read X
- 4. George Washington Ewing X
- 5. James Chrisman X
- 6. Theodore Legrand Burnett X
- 7. Horatio Washington Bruce X
- 8. Humphrey Marshall
- 9. Eli Metcalfe Bruce X
- 10. James William Moore X
- 11. Benjamin Franklin Bradley
- 12. John Milton Elliott X

Louisiana

- 1. Charles Jacques Villeré X
- 2. Charles Magill Conrad X
- 3. Duncan Farrar Kenner X
- 4. Lucius Jacques Dupré X
- 5. Benjamin Lewis Hodge (died August 12, 1864)
  - Henry Gray (took his seat on December 28, 1864 – Elected to fill vacancy October 17, 1864)
- 6. John Perkins Jr. X

Mississippi

- 1. Jehu Amaziah Orr
- 2. William Dunbar Holder X
- 3. Israel Victor Welch X
- 4. Henry Cousins Chambers X
- 5. Otho Robards Singleton X
- 6. Ethelbert Barksdale X
- 7. John Tillman Lamkin

Missouri

In Confederate law, the people of Missouri were entitled to elect thirteen representatives. The state never implemented the reapportionment and continued to use its existing seven districts.

- 1. Thomas Lowndes Snead
- 2. Nimrod Lindsay Norton
- 3. John Bullock Clark Sr.
- 4. Aaron H. Conrow X
- 5. George Graham Vest X (resigned January 12, 1865 to become CS senator)
- 6. Peter Singleton Wilkes
- 7. Robert Anthony Hatcher

North Carolina

- 1. William N. H. Smith X
- 2. Robert Rufus Bridgers X
- 3. James Thomas Leach
- 4. Thomas Charles Fuller
- 5. Josiah Turner
- 6. John Adams Gilmer
- 7. James Madison Leach (Representative-elect Samuel H. Christian died, in March 1864, before taking his seat. Leach was elected April 21, 1864.)
- 8. James Graham Ramsay
- 9. Burgess Sidney Gaither
- 10. George Washington Logan

South Carolina

- 1. James Hervey Witherspoon Jr.
- 2. William Porcher Miles X
- 3. Lewis Malone Ayer Jr. X
- 4. William Dunlap Simpson X
- 5. James Farrow X
- 6. William Waters Boyce X

Tennessee

- 1. Joseph Brown Heiskell X
- 2. William Graham Swan X
- 3. Arthur St. Clair Colyar
- 4. John Porry Murray
- 5. Henry Stuart Foote X (fled to Canada before completing term)
- 6. Edwin Augustus Keebel
- 7. James McCallum
- 8. Thomas Menees X
- 9. John DeWitt Clinton Atkins X
- 10. John Vines Wright X
- 11. Michael Walsh Cluskey (Representative-elect David Maney Currin died, on March 25, 1864, before taking his seat. Cluskey was elected thereafter.)

Texas

- 1. Stephen Heard Darden (Representative-elect John Allen Wilcox died, on February 7, 1864, before taking his seat. Darden was elected August 1864.)
- 2. Caleb Claiborne Herbert X
- 3. Anthony Martin Branch
- 4. Franklin Barlow Sexton X
- 5. John Robert Baylor
- 6. Simpson Harris Morgan

Virginia

- 1. Robert Latane Montague
- 2. Robert Henry Whitfield (resigned March 2, 1865)
- 3. Williams Carter Wickham
- 4. Thomas Saunders Gholson
- 5. Thomas Stanley Bocock X
- 6. John Goode Jr. X
- 7. William Cabell Rives (resigned March 7, 1865)
- 8. Daniel Coleman DeJarnette Sr. X
- 9. David Funsten X
- 10. Frederick William Mackey Holliday
- 11. John Brown Baldwin X
- 12. Waller Redd Staples X
- 13. LaFayette McMullen
- 14. Samuel Augustine Miller X
- 15. Robert Johnston X
- 16. Charles Wells Russell X

=== Delegates ===
Non-voting members of the House of Representatives.

Arizona Territory

- Marcus H. MacWillie X

Cherokee Nation

- Elias Cornelius Boudinot X

Creek and Seminole Nations

- Samuel Benton Callahan

== Senate committees ==
Accounts

- Allen Taylor Caperton, Virginia, Chairman
- William Emmett Simms, Kentucky
- William Theophilus Dortch, North Carolina

Claims

- Henry Cornelius Burnett, Kentucky, Chairman
- James McNair Baker, Florida
- John William Clark Watson, Mississippi — session 2
- Waldo Porter Johnson, Missouri
- William Simpson Oldham Sr., Texas — session 2

Commerce

- William Simpson Oldham Sr., Texas, Chairman
- Richard Wilde Walker, Alabama
- Augustus Emmett Maxwell, Florida
- William Theophilus Dortch, North Carolina
- Landon Carter Haynes Sr., Tennessee

Engrossment and Enrollment

- William Theophilus Dortch, North Carolina, Chairman
- Augustus Emmett Maxwell, Florida
- Allen Taylor Caperton, Virginia
- Richard Wilde Walker, Alabama — session 1
- John William Clark Watson, Mississippi — session 1
  - Henry Cornelius Burnett, Kentucky — temporary, session 1
  - Waldo Porter Johnson, Missouri — temporary, sessions 1 and 2

Finance

- Robert Woodward Barnwell, South Carolina, Chairman
- Thomas Jenkins Semmes, Louisiana
- Robert Mercer Taliaferro Hunter, Virginia
- William Alexander Graham, North Carolina
- Robert Jemison Jr., Alabama — session 1
  - James Lawrence Orr, South Carolina — temporary, session 2
  - William Simpson Oldham Sr., Texas — temporary, session 2

Foreign Relations

- James Lawrence Orr, South Carolina, Chairman
- William Emmett Simms, Kentucky
- Waldo Porter Johnson, Missouri
- Louis Trezevant Wigfall, Texas
- Allen Taylor Caperton, Virginia

Indian Affairs

- Robert Ward Johnson, Arkansas, Chairman
- Augustus Emmet Maxwell, Florida
- Waldo Porter Johnson, Missouri
- William Simpson Oldham Sr., Texas
- Allen Taylor Caperton, Virginia

Judiciary

- Benjamin Harvey Hill, Georgia, Chairman
- Richard Wilde Walker, Alabama
- Thomas Jenkins Semmes, Louisiana
- John William Clark Watson, Mississippi
- Landon Carter Haynes Sr., Tennessee
  - William Simpson Oldham Sr., Texas — temporary, session 2

Military Affairs

- Edward Sparrow, Louisiana, Chairman
- Robert Ward Johnson, Arkansas
- Henry Cornelius Burnett, Kentucky
- Gustavus Adolphus Henry Sr., North Carolina
- Louis Trezevant Wigfall, Texas
  - Augustus Hill Garland, Arkansas — temporary, session 2

Naval Affairs

- Albert Gallatin Brown, Mississippi, Chairman
- James McNair Baker, Florida
- Herschel Vespasian Johnson, Georgia
- William Emmett Simms, Kentucky
- William Alexander Graham, North Carolina

Patents

- Augustus Emmett Maxwell, Florida, Chairman
- Benjamin Harvey Hill, Georgia
- Landon Carter Haynes Sr., Tennessee

Post Offices and Post Roads

- Charles Burton Mitchel, Arkansas (died September 20, 1864) — session 1
- James McNair Baker, Florida
- Landon Carter Haynes Sr., Tennessee
- William Simpson Oldham Sr., Texas
- Robert Jemison Jr., Alabama — session 1
- Augustus Hill Garland, Arkansas — session 2
  - Richard Wilde Walker, Alabama — temporary, session 2
  - Allen Taylor Caperton, Virginia — temporary, session 2

Printing

- John William Clark Watson, Mississippi, Chairman
- James Lawrence Orr, South Carolina
- Landon Carter Haynes Sr., Tennessee

Public Buildings

- Richard Wilde Walker, Alabama
- James McNair Baker, Florida
- William Emmett Simms, Kentucky

Public Lands

- James McNair Baker, Florida, Chairman
- Robert Ward Johnson, Arkansas
- Gustavus Adolphus Henry Sr., North Carolina

Rules

- James Lawrence Orr, South Carolina, Chairman
- Robert Ward Johnson, Arkansas
- Thomas Jenkins Semmes, Louisiana

Territories

- Louis Trezevant Wigfall, Texas, Chairman
- Charles Burton Mitchel, Arkansas (died September 20, 1864) — session 1
- Robert Woodward Barnwell, South Carolina

== House committees ==
Accounts

- John Troup Shewmake, 5th Georgia
- Israel Victor Welch, 3rd Mississippi
- James Farrow, 5th South Carolina
- James McCallum, 7th Tennessee
- Robert Johnston, 15th Virginia

Claims

- James Shelton Dickinson, 9th Alabama
- Warren Akin Sr., 10th Georgia
- George Washington Triplett, 2nd Kentucky
- Israel Victor Welch, 3rd Mississippi
- William N. H. Smith, 1st North Carolina
- James Farrow, 5th South Carolina
- Joseph Brown Heiskell, 1st Tennessee
- Frederick William Mackey Holliday, 10th Virginia
- George Washington Ewing, 4th Kentucky — session 2
- Nimrod Lindsay Norton, 2nd Missouri — session 2
- Caleb Claiborne Herbert, 2nd Texas — session 2

Commerce

- James Shelton Dickinson, 9th Alabama
- Julian Hartridge, 1st Georgia
- Theodore Legrand Burnett, 6th Kentucky
- John Perkins Jr., 6th Louisiana
- John Tillman Lamkin, 7th Mississippi
- Thomas Charles Fuller, 4th North Carolina
- James Farrow, 5th South Carolina
- John DeWitt Clinton Atkins, 9th Tennessee
- John Goode Jr., 6th Virginia
- Lewis Malone Ayer Jr., 3rd South Carolina — session 2
- David Williamson Carroll, 3rd Arkansas — session 2
- Caleb Claiborne Herbert, 2nd Texas — session 2

Elections

- Robert Benjamin Hilton, 2nd Florida
- Hiram Parks Bell, 9th Georgia
- James Chrisman, 5th Kentucky
- William Dunbar Holder, 2nd Mississippi
- John Adams Gilmer, 6th North Carolina
- William Dunlap Simpson, 4th South Carolina
- Joseph Brown Heiskell, 1st Tennessee
- Anthony Martin Branch, 3rd Texas
- Samuel Augustine Miller, 14th Virginia
- John Bullock Clark Sr., 3rd Missouri — session 2

Enrolled Bills

- Marcus Henderson Cruikshank, 4th Alabama
- Samuel St. George Rogers, 1st Florida
- Thomas Charles Fuller, 4th North Carolina
- Robert Anthony Hatcher, 7th Missouri — temporary, session 2

Flag and Seal

- William Parish Chilton Sr., 6th Alabama
- Henry Cousins Chambers, 4th Mississippi
- William Cabell Rives, 7th Virginia (resigned March 7, 1865)
- David Funsten, 9th Virginia — temporary, session 2

Foreign Affairs

- Henry Stuart Foote, 5th Tennessee, Chairman (fled to Canada before completing term)
- William Russell Smith, 2nd Alabama
- Horatio Washington Bruce, 7th Kentucky
- John Perkins Jr., 6th Louisiana
- Jehu Amaziah Orr, 1st Mississippi
- Josiah Turner, 5th North Carolina
- James Hervey Witherspoon Jr., 1st South Carolina
- Daniel Coleman DeJarnette Sr., 8th Virginia
- William Cabell Rives, 7th Virginia (resigned March 7, 1865)
- John DeWitt Clinton Atkins, 9th Tennessee — session 2
- Thomas Lowndes Snead, 1st Missouri — session 2

Indian Affairs

- Otho Robards Singleton, 5th Mississippi, Chairman — session 1
- Thomas Jefferson Foster, 1st Alabama
- Thomas Burton Hanly, 4th Arkansas
- Samuel St. George Rogers, 1st Florida
- Joseph Hubbard Echols, 6th Georgia
- James Chrisman, 5th Kentucky
- Josiah Turner, 5th North Carolina
- John Porry Murray, 4th Tennessee
- Samuel Augustine Miller, 14th Virginia
- Elias Cornelius Boudinot, Cherokee Nation
- John Robert Baylor, 5th Texas — session 2
- Peter Singleton Wilkes, 6th Missouri — session 2
- John Milton Elliott, 12th Kentucky — session 2

Judiciary

- William Parish Chilton Sr., 6th Alabama
- Mark Harden Blandford, 3rd Georgia
- James William Moore, 10th Kentucky
- Lucius Jacques Dupré, 4th Louisiana
- Burgess Sidney Gaither, 9th North Carolina
- Edwin Augustus Keebel, 6th Tennessee
- Thomas Saunders Gholson, 4th Virginia
- Charles Wells Russell, 16th Virginia
- Augustus Hill Garland, 3rd Arkansas (resigned to become CS senator November 8, 1864) — session 1
- Simpson Harris Morgan, 6th Texas (died December 15, 1864) — session 2
- Felix Ives Batson, 1st Arkansas — session 2
- Henry Gray, 5th Louisiana — session 2
- George Graham Vest, 5th Missouri — session 2

Medical Department

- David Clopton, 7th Alabama
- Joseph Hubbard Echols, 6th Georgia
- Henry English Read, 3rd Kentucky
- William Dunbar Holder, 2nd Mississippi
- James Graham Ramsay, 8th North Carolina
- James Farrow, 5th South Carolina
- James McCallum, 7th Tennessee
- Thomas Menees, 8th Tennessee
- Daniel Coleman DeJarnette Sr., 8th Virginia

Military Affairs

- William Porcher Miles, 2nd South Carolina, Chairman
- James Lawrence Pugh, 8th Alabama
- Thomas Burton Hanly, 4th Arkansas
- Robert Benjamin Hilton, 2nd Florida
- James Milton Smith, 7th Georgia
- Humphrey Marshall, 8th Kentucky
- Charles Jacques Villeré, 1st Louisiana
- Henry Cousins Chambers, 4th Mississippi
- Robert Rufus Bridgers, 2nd North Carolina
- William Graham Swan, 2nd Tennessee
- Anthony Martin Branch, 3rd Texas
- Waller Redd Staples, 12th Virginia
- John Bullock Clark Sr., 3rd Missouri — session 2
- Williams Carter Wickham, 3rd Virginia — session 2

Naval Affairs

- David Clopton, 7th Alabama, Chairman
- Samuel St. George Rogers, 1st Florida
- John Troup Shewmake, 5th Georgia
- William Dunbar Holder, 2nd Mississippi
- James Graham Ramsay, 8th North Carolina
- William Waters Boyce, 6th South Carolina
- John Vines Wright, 10th Tennessee
- David Funsten, 9th Virginia
- Robert Henry Whitfield, 2nd Virginia (resigned March 2, 1865)
- Michael Walsh Cluskey, 11th Tennessee — session 2
- Stephen Heard Darden, 1st Texas — session 2

Ordnance and Ordnance Stores

- Marcus Henderson Cruikshank, 4th Alabama
- William Ephraim Smith, 2nd Georgia
- Benjamin Franklin Bradley, 11th Kentucky
- Ethelbert Barksdale, 6th Mississippi
- George Washington Logan, 10th North Carolina
- James Hervey Witherspoon Jr., 1st South Carolina
- John Porry Murray, 4th Tennessee
- John DeWitt Clinton Atkins, 9th Tennessee
- Robert Latané Montague, 1st Virginia
- Robert Anthony Hatcher, 7th Missouri — session 2
- Lewis Malone Ayer Jr., 3rd South Carolina — session 2

Patents

- William Parish Chilton Sr., 6th Alabama, Chairman
- Hiram Parks Bell, 9th Georgia
- Horatio Washington Bruce, 7th Kentucky
- John Tillman Lamkin, 7th Mississippi
- Thomas Charles Fuller, 4th North Carolina
- Joseph Brown Heiskell, 1st Tennessee
- Robert Henry Whitfield, 2nd Virginia (resigned March 2, 1865)
- John Robert Baylor, 5th Texas — session 2

Pay and Mileage

- Theodore Legrand Burnett, 6th Kentucky, Chairman
- Thomas Burton Hanly, 4th Arkansas
- Joseph Hubbard Echols, 6th Georgia
  - Mark Harden Blandford, 3rd Georgia — temporary, session 2

Post Offices and Post Roads

- Thomas Jefferson Foster, 1st Alabama
- Hiram Parks Bell, 9th Georgia
- Benjamin Franklin Bradley, 11th Kentucky
- John Tillman Lamkin, 7th Mississippi
- James Thomas Leach, 3rd North Carolina
- James Hervey Witherspoon Jr., 1st South Carolina
- James McCallum, 7th Tennessee
- Franklin Barlow Sexton, 4th Texas
- LaFayette McMullen, 13th Virginia
- John Milton Elliott, 12th Kentucky — session 2
- Peter Singleton Wilkes, 6th Missouri — session 2

Printing

- Lucius Jacques Dupré, 4th Louisiana, Chairman
- Marcus Henderson Cruikshank, 4th Alabama
- George Washington Logan, 10th North Carolina
- William Graham Swan, 2nd Tennessee
- John Goode Jr., 6th Virginia

Public Buildings

- James Lawrence Pugh, 8th Alabama, Chairman
- Charles Magill Conrad, 2nd Louisiana
- LaFayette McMullen, 13th Virginia
- William Dunbar Holder, 2nd Mississippi — session 2
- Aaron H. Conrow, 4th Missouri — session 2

Quartermaster's and Commissary Departments and Military Transportation

- George Nelson Lester, 8th Georgia
- Willis Benson Machen, 1st Kentucky
- Henry English Read, 3rd Kentucky
- Jehu Amaziah Orr, 1st Mississippi
- James Madison Leach, 7th North Carolina (elected April 21, 1864)
- William Dunlap Simpson, 4th South Carolina
- Henry Stuart Foote, 5th Tennessee (fled to Canada before completing term)
- Frederick William Mackey Holliday, 10th Virginia
- Robert Johnston, 15th Virginia
- Aaron H. Conrow, 4th Missouri — session 2

Rules and Officers of the House

- William Parish Chilton Sr., 6th Alabama
- George Nelson Lester, 8th Georgia
- John Perkins Jr., 6th Louisiana
- William N. H. Smith, 1st North Carolina
- Robert Latané Montague, 1st Virginia

Territories and Public Lands

- Thomas Jefferson Foster, 1st Alabama
- Robert Benjamin Hilton, 2nd Florida
- William Ephraim Smith, 2nd Georgia
- James Chrisman, 5th Kentucky
- James Thomas Leach, 3rd North Carolina
- Thomas Menees, 8th Tennessee
- Anthony Martin Branch, 3rd Texas
- LaFayette McMullen, 13th Virginia
- Augustus Hill Garland, 3rd Arkansas (resigned to become CS senator November 8, 1864) — session 1
- George Washington Ewing, 4th Kentucky — session 2
- Nimrod Lindsay Norton, 2nd Missouri — session 2

Ways and Means

- Francis Strother Lyon, 5th Alabama, Chairman
- Clifford Anderson, 4th Georgia
- Eli Metcalfe Bruce, 9th Kentucky
- Charles Magill Conrad, 2nd Louisiana
- Ethelbert Barksdale, 6th Mississippi
- John Adams Gilmer, 6th North Carolina
- Arthur St. Clair Colyar, 3rd Tennessee
- Franklin Barlow Sexton, 4th Texas
- John Brown Baldwin, 11th Virginia
- Duncan Farrar Kenner, 3rd Louisiana — session 2
- Rufus King Garland Jr., 2nd Arkansas — session 2

== Joint committees ==
Impressments (Session 1)

- Senators
  - John William Clark Watson, Mississippi
  - William Alexander Graham, North Carolina
  - Robert Woodward Barnwell, South Carolina
- Representatives
  - William Parish Chilton Sr., 6th Alabama
  - Thomas Burton Hanly, 4th Arkansas
  - Julian Hartridge, 1st Georgia
  - Henry Cousins Chambers, 4th Mississippi
  - John Brown Baldwin, 11th Virginia
