= Robert Whitfield =

Robert Whitfield may refer to:

- Robert Parr Whitfield (1828–1910), American invertebrate paleontologist and curator of geology
- Robert Henry Whitfield (1814–1868), Confederate politician
- Smoki Whitfield (Robert Whitfield, 1918–1967), African American actor, comedian, and musician
- Bob Whitfield (born 1971), American football player
- Robert "Goodie" Whitfield, R&B singer with the 1982 album Call Me Goodie
