= Senator Triplett =

Senator Triplett may refer to:

- Constance Triplett (born 1950s), North Dakota State Senate
- George Washington Triplett (1809–1894), Kentucky State Senate
