= Senator Herbert =

Senator Herbert may refer to:

- Caleb Claiborne Herbert (1814–1867), Texas State Senate
- Frank Herbert (politician) (1931–2018), New Jersey State Senate
- Paul M. Herbert (1889–1983), Ohio State Senate

== See also ==
- Felix Hebert (1874–1969), U.S. Senator from Rhode Island
- Troy Hebert (born 1966), Louisiana State Senate
