= James Witherspoon =

James Witherspoon may refer to:

- James Hervey Witherspoon Jr. (1810–1865), Confederate States of America politician
- Jim Witherspoon (born 1951), retired Canadian ice hockey defenceman
- Jimmy Witherspoon (1920–1997), American blues singer
