= George Ewing =

George Ewing may refer to:

- Bob Ewing (George Lemuel Ewing, 1873–1947), Major League Baseball pitcher
- George C. Ewing (1810–1888), American politician and founding figure of Holyoke, Massachusetts
- George Ewing (cricketer) (1851–1930), New Zealand cricketer
- George Edwin Ewing (1828–1884), Scottish sculptor
- George Washington Ewing (1808–1888), Confederate politician during the American Civil War
- George Ewing, 1890s footballer, see List of Bury F.C. players (1–24 appearances)
- George Ewing (footballer) (born 2007), Scottish footballer, see Football at the 2025 Island Games – Men's tournament
