= Justice Fuller (disambiguation) =

Melville Fuller (1833–1910) was chief justice of the United States. Justice Fuller may also refer to:

- Jerome Fuller (1808–1880), chief justice of Minnesota Territorial Supreme Court
- Thomas Charles Fuller (1832–1901), justice of the United States Court of Private Land Claims
