= Simpson Harris Morgan =

Confederate politician

Simpson Harris Morgan (1821 – December 15, 1864) was a lawyer, farmer, and railroad promoter who served in the Confederate States House of Representatives from Texas. Born in Tennessee, Morgan moved to Texas, where he eventually settled in Clarksville and practiced law. He also farmed and served as the president of the Memphis, El Paso and Pacific Railway. In 1863, he defeated incumbent William Bacon Wright for a seat in the Confederate House of Representatives in the Second Confederate Congress. In Congress, Morgan generally supported strengthening the Confederate central government, although he opposed certain agricultural taxes. While traveling to the second session of the Second Confederate Congress, Morgan died of pneumonia at Monticello, Arkansas.

== Biography ==
Morgan was born in 1821 in Rutherford County, Tennessee, although the exact date is not known according to his descendents. The details of his early life are obscure, and little is known about him in general. After an education in the local schools of Rutherford County, he moved to Paris, Texas, in 1844 along with the lawyer R. K. Clark. Morgan then moved to Clarksville, where he worked as a lawyer. The historians Ezra J. Warner and W. Buck Yearns state that Morgan "became one of the most prominent citizens of Clarksville and its vicinity". The 1850 United States census listed Morgan as the owner of property valued at $500 (equivalent to $19,350 in 2025). On September 7, 1852, he married a sister of future Confederate congressmen Rufus K. Garland and Augustus H. Garland, although she died on March 1 of the next year. He was involved in the promotion of the Memphis, El Paso and Pacific Railway, which received its charter in 1853, and spent some time as the railroad's president, in addition to farming. Morgan remarried in 1859 to a Tennessean named Laura. The couple had one daughter, who was reported to be one month old at the time of the 1860 United States census, which valued his real estate holdings at $18,150 (equivalent to $650,375 in 2025) and his personal property at $8,000 (equivalent to $286,667 in 2025).

In November 1863, Morgan was elected to the Second Confederate Congress, beating the incumbent William Bacon Wright. Warner and Yearns state that the election was "evidently based upon personalities rather than issues". The seat was for Texas's 6th District in the Confederate States House of Representatives. Morgan only attended the first session of the Second Confederate Congress, where he opposed certain agricultural taxes, but otherwise supported strengthening the Confederate national government's ability to continue the American Civil War. The historian Jon L. Wakelyn states that Morgan was part of the Impressment and Judiciary committees in the Confederate Congress, while Warner and Yearns only list the Judiciary committee. The historian Joseph Milton Nance lists the Impressment and Judicial committees, as well as the Select Compensation and Mileage committee. He generally did not engage in congressional debate. Morgan developed pneumonia while he was traveling to the next congressional session, which was to be held at Richmond, Virginia. He died at Monticello, Arkansas, on December 15, 1864, and was buried in the family plot in Clarksville. Morgan's son-in-law was Albert B. Fall, a future United States Secretary of the Interior who was involved in the Teapot Dome scandal.

== Sources ==
- Nance, Joseph (1993). "Morgan, Simpson Harris". In Current, Richard N. (ed.). Encyclopedia of the Confederacy. Vol. 3. New York, New York: Simon & Schuster. pp. 1087–1088. ISBN 9780132760317.
- Wakelyn, Jon L. (1977). Biographical Dictionary of the Confederacy. Westport, Connecticut: Greenwood Press. ISBN 0-8371-6124-X.
- Warner, Ezra J.; Yearns, W. Buck (1975). Biographical Register of the Confederate Congress. Baton Rouge, Louisiana: Louisiana State University Press. ISBN 0-8071-0092-7.
