= Maplewood Cemetery (Pulaski, Tennessee) =

Historic cemetery in Giles County, Tennessee, US

- U.S. National Register of Historic Places
- U.S. Historic district
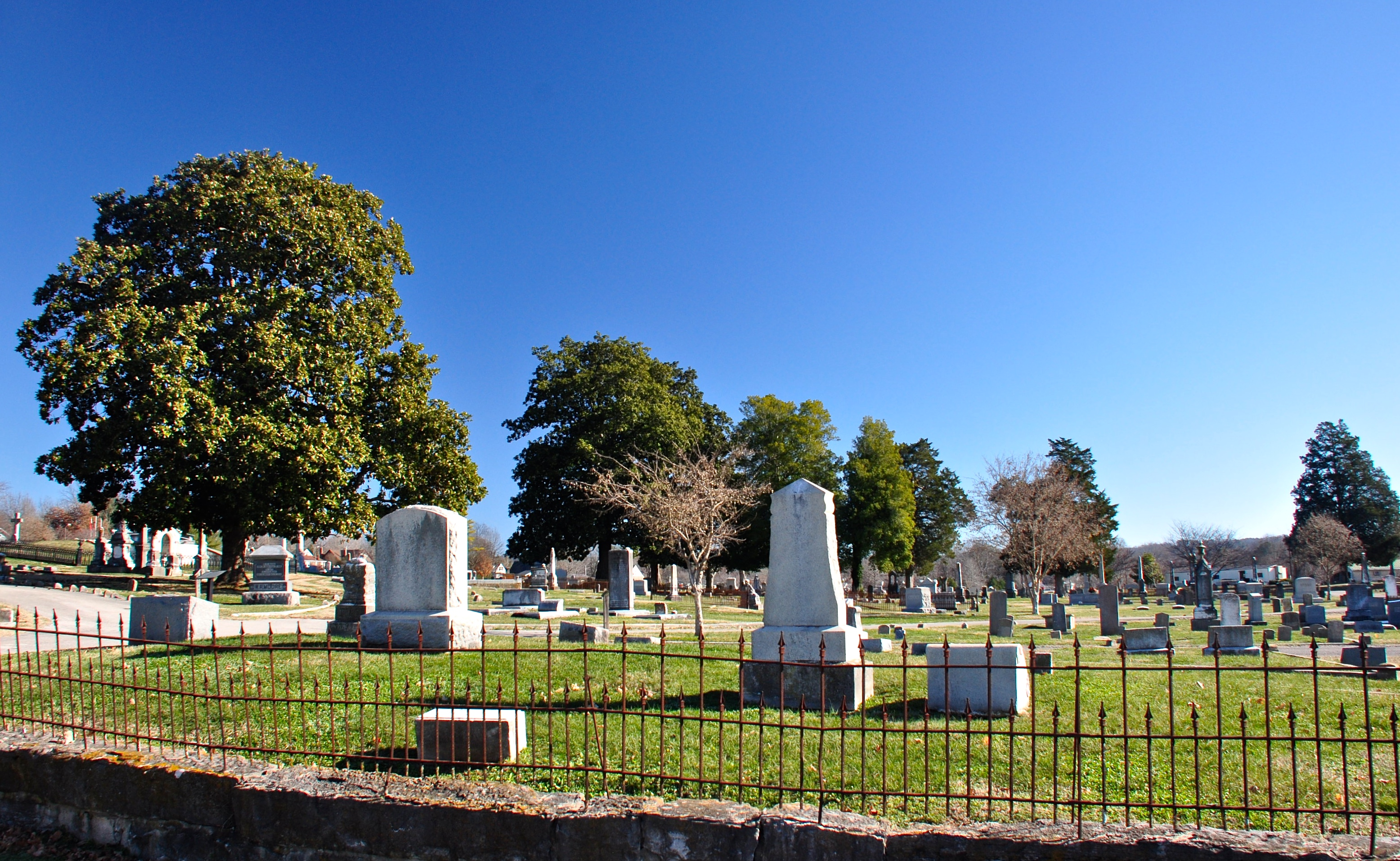
- The cemetery in 2015

- Location within Tennessee Location within the United States
- Location: South Sam Davis Avenue, Pulaski, Tennessee
- Coordinates: 35°11′37″N 87°01′44″W
- Area: 16 acres (6.5 ha)
- Built: 1855
- NRHP reference No.: 05000854
- Added to NRHP: November 15, 2005

The Maplewood Cemetery, formerly known as the New Pulaski Cemetery, is a historic cemetery in Pulaski, Tennessee, U.S..

== History ==
The cemetery was established as the New Pulaski Cemetery in 1855. The oldest section, known as Old Maplewood, contains the burials of whites and blacks. In 1878, another section was added for African-American burials. The name was changed to Maplewood Cemetery in 1880. It was further expanded in 1907 and the 1940s.

The first person to be buried in Old Maplewood was Robert H. Watkins, a planter. The black burials are unmarked, while the white burials are often adorned with sculptures of angels and obelisks. There is a sub-section for the 85 veterans of the Confederate States Army buried there, including a monument dedicated by the United Daughters of the Confederacy in 1913. Other burials include Masons, and 40 veterans of the United States Colored Troops. Three of the original 1865 founders of the Ku Klux Klan in Pulaski are also buried here: John C. Lester (OM-141-2); James R. Crowe (OM-169-2), and; J. Calvin Jones (OM-164-10).

The cemetery has been listed on the National Register of Historic Places since November 15, 2005.

== Notable burials ==
- John Adams (1825–1864), Confederate general
- John Goff Ballentine (1825–1915), U.S. Representative, Confederate colonel
- Ross Bass (1918–1993), U.S. Representative and U.S. Senator
- John C. Brown (1827–1889), governor of Tennessee, Confederate general
- Elizabeth Childress Brown (1842–1919), First Lady of Tennessee, President General of the United Daughters of the Confederacy
- Edward E. Eslick (1872–1932), U.S. Representative
- Willa McCord Blake Eslick (1878–1961), U.S. Representative
- Z. W. Ewing (1843–1909), speaker of the Tennessee Senate
- Thomas McKissick Jones (1816–1892), U.S. Representative and Confederate congressman, state senator and judge
- Thomas Martin (1799–1870), founder of Martin Methodist College
- James McCallum (1806–1889), state representative and Confederate congressman
- Lena Springs (1883–1942), first woman candidate nominated for U.S. Vice President
