= Z. W. Ewing =

American politician (1843–1909)

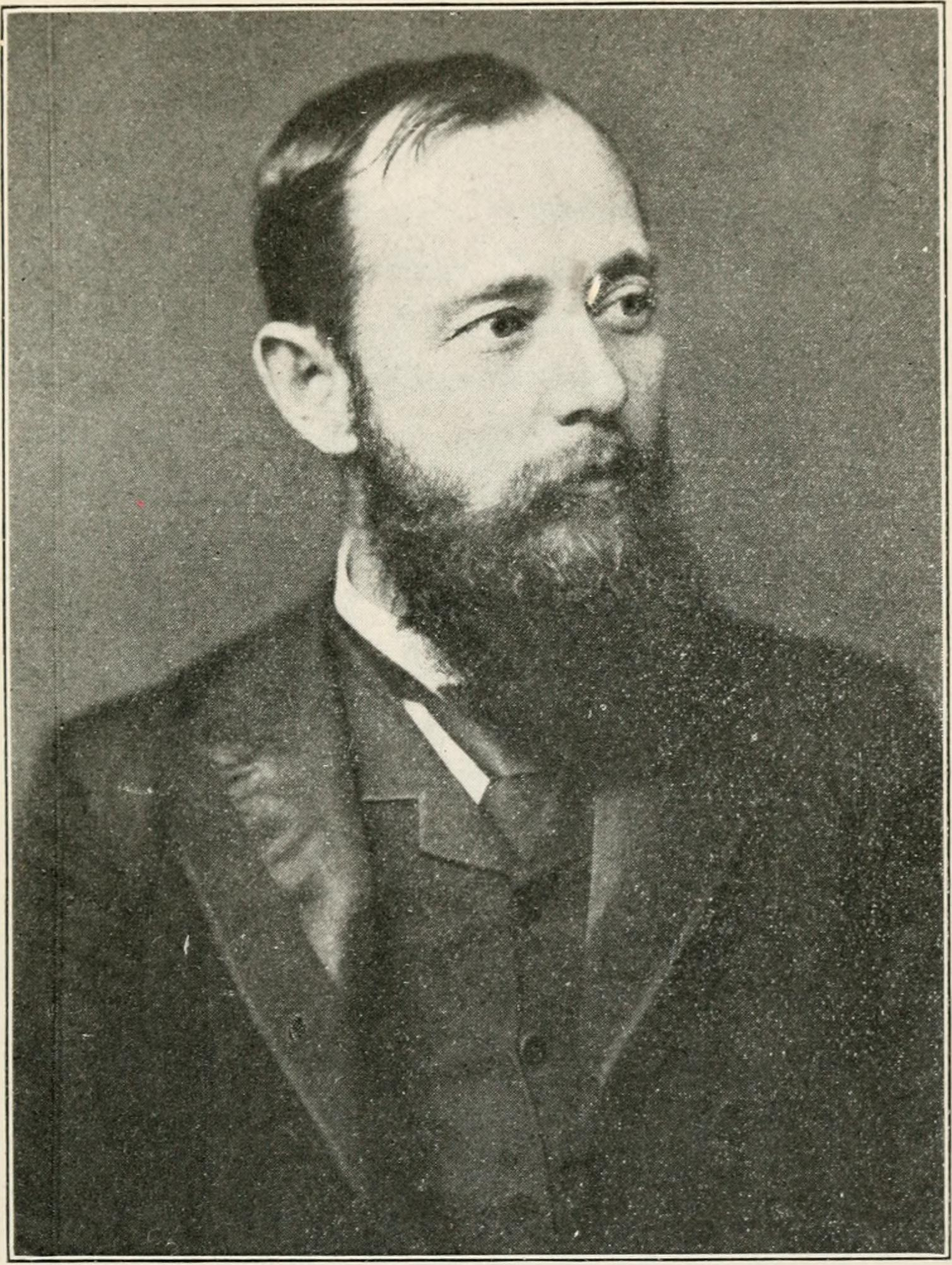
- Ewing in a 1911 publication

Speaker of the Tennessee Senate and Lieutenant Governor of Tennessee
- In office 1887–1889
- Preceded by: Cabell R. Berry
- Succeeded by: Benjamin J. Lea

Member of the Tennessee Senate from the 17th district
- In office 1887–1889

Personal details
- Born: Zwingle Whitefield Ewing; August 14, 1843 near Lewisburg, Tennessee, U.S.
- Died: August 9, 1909 (aged 65) Pulaski, Tennessee, U.S.
- Resting place: Maplewood Cemetery
- Party: Democratic
- Spouse(s): Harriet P. Jones (m. 1871; died 1889) Kate Bradley (m. 1892)
- Children: 3
- Education: Maryville College; University of Virginia
- Occupation: Politician; lawyer

Zwingle Whitefield Ewing (August 14, 1843 – August 9, 1909) was an American politician and lawyer from Tennessee. He served as an officer in the Confederate States Army from 1861 to 1865. He served in the Tennessee Senate and was speaker of the senate and lieutenant governor of Tennessee from 1887 to 1889.

== Early life and education ==
Zwingle Whitefield Ewing was born on August 14, 1843, near Lewisburg, Marshall County, Tennessee, as the seventh of eight children to R. A. (née Leeper) and L. A. Ewing. His father was a merchant, farmer, and magistrate. He farmed in the summer and attended country schools in the winter. In 1859, he entered Maryville College in east Tennessee. He remained there until the start of the Civil War. He later attended the University of Virginia in 1866 and graduated in 1868. He was a member of the Omicron chapter of Beta Theta Pi.

== Career ==
In May 1861, Ewing enlisted in R. H. McCory's company, later the 17th Tennessee Infantry Regiment of the Confederate States Army commanded by Albert S. Marks. He was soon appointed as second lieutenant. When the regiment was reorganized in May 1862, he was promoted to a third lieutenant of company H in the regiment. He was captured in May 1864 in south Petersburg, Virginia, while serving under General P. G. T. Beauregard. He was taken prisoner at Fort Delaware. He was also held at Fort Pulaski, Hilton Head, and Sullivan's Island. He remained imprisoned until the end of the war. He was a member of the Immortal Six Hundred. During the war, he served as captain and major for two years.

In the fall of 1868, Ewing taught school in Richmond, Tennessee. In 1870, he spent a year in Europe and studied the German language. He also taught school in Pulaski. In 1871, he studied law under Thomas McKissick Jones of Pulaski. He was admitted to the bar in December 1871 and then practiced law in Pulaski. He was a lawyer with the Louisville and Nashville Railroad for 30 years. He was also the lawyer of the Cumberland Telephone & Telegraph and the Southern Express and served as town attorney of Pulaski. He was a member of the law firm Jones, Son & Ewing with Charles P. Jones. He was appointed by Governor James D. Porter as an assessor of railroads in 1877. He remained in that role until 1878. He was a Democrat. In 1887, he was elected to the Tennessee Senate, representing the 17th district (Lincoln and Giles counties). He served as speaker of the senate and lieutenant governor of Tennessee from 1887 to 1889. While speaker, he ordered the senate's clerk to not count members who failed to answer roll call. This precedent was later followed by speaker of the U.S. House of Representatives Thomas Brackett Reed. He served as chairman multiple times of the State Democratic Conventions.

In 1883, he helped organize the People's National Bank and then served as its vice president. Following the bank's reorganization, he served as its president until he left due to poor health in 1908. By 1888, he was chairman of the board of education in Pulaski. In 1893, he bought E. B. Craig's interest in the Craig Brothers drugstore, which was renamed to the C. A. Craig and Company. In 1907, he retired from his law practice. He was a member of the courthouse commission, succeeding Flournoy Rivers. He was appointed as one of the first board of governors of the University of Tennessee in 1879. He later became trustee of the university in 1892. He was a member of the John H. Woldridge Camp of the United Confederate Veterans and was president of the organization's state chapter. He helped organize and was a stockholder of the Massey School in Pulaski. He served on the board of directors of the Pulaski Training School at the Massey School until his death. The Ewing dormitory was named after him.

== Personal life ==
Ewing married Harriet "Hattie" P. Jones, daughter of Thomas McKissick Jones, in 1871. They had one daughter, Marietta. His wife died in 1889. He later married Kate Bradley of Franklin in September 1892. They had two children, Z. W. Jr. and Rebecca. He was a member of the Presbyterian Church, South and was superintendent of the Sunday school in Pulaski. He was president of the Giles County Bible Society for about 20 years. He was also a member of the Masons and the Knights of Pythias.

Ewing died of pneumonia on August 9, 1909, at his Main Street home in Pulaski. His funeral was attended by Lemuel P. Padgett and judge Sam Holding. He was buried in Maplewood Cemetery.
