= Thomas McKissick Jones =

American politician (1813–1892)

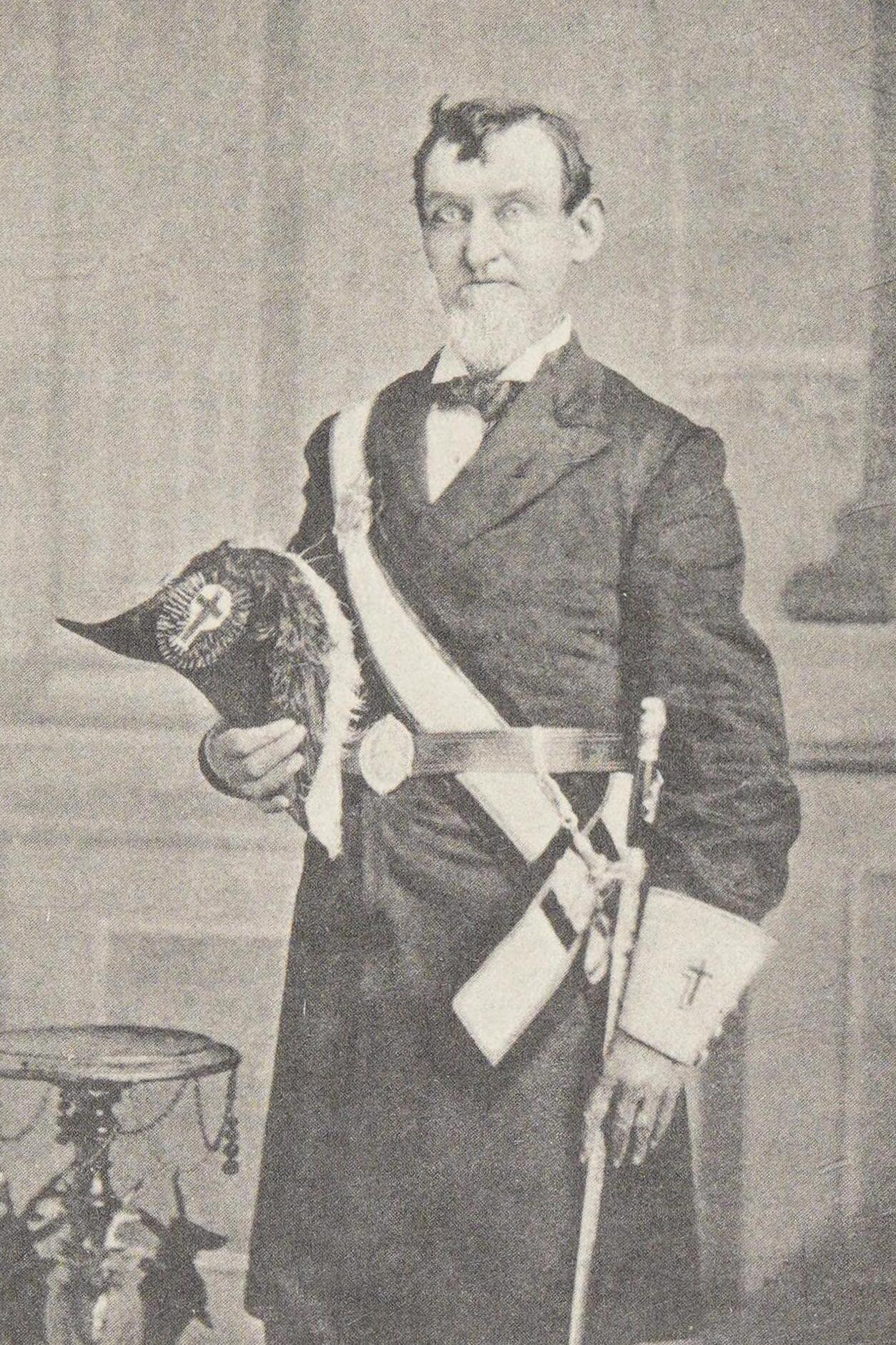
- Portrait of Jones in an 1888 publication

Member of the Provisional Congress of the Confederate States
- In office 1861–1862

Member of the Tennessee Senate
- In office 1847–1849
- Constituency: Giles and Maury counties

Member of the Tennessee House of Representatives from the Giles County district
- In office 1845–1847

Personal details
- Born: December 16, 1813 (or 1816) Person County, North Carolina, U.S.
- Died: March 13, 1892 Pulaski, Tennessee, U.S.
- Resting place: Maplewood Cemetery
- Party: Democratic
- Spouse(s): Marietta Perkins (m. 1838; died 1872) Annie G. Wood (m. 1883; died 1888)
- Children: 9
- Education: University of Alabama; University of Virginia
- Occupation: Politician; lawyer
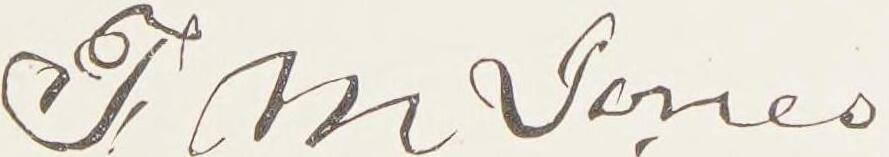
- Signature
- Military career
- Branch: United States Army
- Conflicts: Second Seminole War; Battle of Lost Creek; Battle of Wahoo Swamp; Battle of Withlacoochee

Thomas McKissick Jones (1813 or 1816 – March 13, 1892) was an American politician from Tennessee. He served as a captain in the Second Seminole War. A slave owner, he served in the Tennessee House of Representatives and Tennessee Senate in the 1840s. He represented Tennessee in the Provisional Confederate Congress from 1861 to 1862. After the Civil War, he served as a state court judge from 1872 to 1873.

== Early life ==
Thomas McKissick Jones was born on December 16, 1813 (or 1816), in Person County, North Carolina. His parents were Rebecca (née McKissick) and Wilson Jones. His paternal and maternal grandfathers Wilson Jones and Thomas McKissick served in the Continental Army in the Revolutionary War. When he was an infant, he moved to Giles County, Tennessee, with his family. He attended local schools in Giles County. After his parents died, he was raised by his maternal grandparents Lucy Hudson and Thomas McKissick. After his grandparents died, he lived with his oldest sister Lucy and her husband Spencer Clack, son of Tennessee legislator John Clack. He attended Wirtenberg Academy in Pulaski. He attended the University of Alabama from 1831 to 1833 and then graduated from the University of Virginia in 1835. He then studied law in the Pulaski law office of Flournoy & Rivers until 1836.

== Career ==
In 1836, Jones stopped studying law to volunteer and raise a company of 108 men for the Second Seminole War in Florida. The company was later named Company A of the 1st Tennessee Cavalry Regiment under Alexander B. Bradford and Terry H. Cahal. He was named captain and served alongside Neill S. Brown, Archibald Wright, Solon E. Rose, A. F. Goff, Jesse Mays, J. Nelson Patterson, and Daniel Wright. The group nicknamed themselves the "Hyenas" and fought at the battles of Lost Creek, Wahoo Swamp, and Withlacooche. After the war, he returned home and was admitted to practice law.

Jones practiced law in Pulaski with John W. Goode. He continued practicing law until 1844 when he was appointed as county elector on the Democratic ticket. He stumped Giles County for James K. Polk and George M. Dallas. Jones was a Democrat. In 1845, he was elected to the Tennessee House of Representatives. He served as acting chairman of the penitentiary and a member of the judiciary committee. In 1847, he was elected to the Tennessee Senate, representing Giles and Maury counties. By the Civil War, he owned 80 slaves and 1,000 acres (400 ha) of land.

In 1861, Jones served in the Provisional Congress of the Confederate States. He did not seek re-election, and returned to Pulaski. He was paroled in Nashville by Governor Andrew Johnson under the stipulation that he would not communicate with the Confederate Congress or the Confederate military while surrounded by the Union Army in Pulaski. After the forces left Pulaski, he moved further south, but did not enlist. He was a delegate to the 1856 Democratic National Convention and nominated James Buchanan. He was a delegate to the 1860 Democratic National Convention and nominated John C. Breckinridge. He was the Giles county delegate to the 1870 Tennessee Constitutional Convention. He served on the judiciary committee of that convention. He was also in favor of a clause that forbid the charge of more than six percent interest in a year under any circumstances, but the clause was defeated. He was a delegate to the 1880 Democratic National Convention and nominated Winfield Scott Hancock. He also served as the mayor of Pulaski for multiple terms.

In 1865, the Ku Klux Klan was organized in the Pulaski law office of Jones. His son Calvin was one of the founders of the organization. He was on a committee of citizens of Giles County that met in December 1868 and February 1869 to ask Governor Dewitt Clinton Senter to withdraw the Tennessee State Guard from the county. Jones stating in his message to Senter that the militia had executed prisoners that were in the county's jail. Jones served as judge of the criminal court of Giles, Maury, Williamson, and Marshall counties for ten months from 1872 to 1873. He was then judge of the Court of Commission for over 12 months alongside judges Hickerson and Garner. In 1877 or 1879, he was a judge of the Court of Arbitration for middle Tennessee. He was appointed as special judge of the Supreme Court of Tennessee by governors Albert S. Marks, Alvin Hawkins, and William B. Bate. In the State of Tennessee vs. George K. Whitworth, Jones gave the opinion that the city of Nashville, Davidson County, and the state did not have the right to tax the land that North Carolina granted to the University of Nashville. In 1855, he became a director of the Louisville and Nashville Railroad. He was a director of the Planters' Bank of Pulaski for 18 years and a director of the National Bank of Pulaski for 10 or 12 years. He was director of the Columbia, Pulaski, and Elkton Turnpike Company from 1842 to 1855. He was on the board of trustees of Giles College from its incorporation to its closing.

== Personal life ==
Jones married Marietta Perkins, daughter of Harriet (née Field) and Charles Perkins, on December 25, 1838. She was also the cousin of Confederate colonel Hume R. Field and the granddaughter of Virginia judge Hume Field and Nicholas Tate Perkins. They had nine children: Calvin, Charles P., Hume Field, Harriet, Edward S., Lucy Anne, Thomas W., Lee Walthal, and Nicholas. His wife died in 1872. Three of his sons, Calvin, Charles, and Thomas were soldiers of the Confederate States Army. His daughter Harriet married lawyer and politician Z. W. Ewing. He married Ann G. (née Perkins) Wood of Brownsville on May 9, 1883. She was the daughter of Nicholas T. Perkins, widow of James Proudfit Wood, and cousin of his first wife. She died in 1888. In 1843, he became a Mason. He attained the rank of Knight Templar. He was a member and served for 20 years as vestryman of the Protestant Episcopal Church of Pulaski.

Jones died on March 13, 1892, in Pulaski. He was buried in Maplewood Cemetery.
