= Michael Walsh Cluskey =

American politician (c.1832–1873)

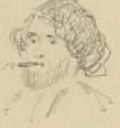
Sketch of Cluskey, by Alfred Waud

Michael Walsh Cluskey (c. 1832 – January 13, 1873) was an American politician who served in the Confederate States Congress during the American Civil War.

== Biography ==
Cluskey was born c. 1832, in Savannah, Georgia, and was baptized May 11, 1832. He worked as a newspaper editor for the Memphis Avalanche and the Louisville Daily Ledger. From 1852 and 1859, he served as Postmaster of the United States House of Representatives, and was succeeded by Josiah M. Lucas. During the American Civil War, he served as an assistant quartermaster-general in the Confederate States Army and eventually rose to the rank of colonel. He was elected to represent Tennessee in the Second Confederate Congress from 1864 to 1865. He died on January 13, 1873, aged 40 or 41, from injuries inflicted during the Battle of Shiloh and was interred at Mount Olivet Cemetery in Washington, D.C.
