= William E. Simms =

American politician

Confederate States Senator from Kentucky
- In office February 18, 1862 – May 10, 1865
- Preceded by: New constituency
- Succeeded by: Constituency abolished

Member of the U.S. House of Representatives from Kentucky's 8th district
- In office March 4, 1859 – March 3, 1861
- Preceded by: James Clay
- Succeeded by: John Crittenden

Member of the Kentucky House of Representatives
- In office 1849–1851

Personal details
- Born: William Elliott Simms; January 2, 1822 Harrison County, Kentucky, U.S.
- Died: June 25, 1898 (aged 76) Paris, Kentucky, U.S.
- Party: Democratic
- Education: Transylvania University

William E. Simms (born William Elliott Simms; January 2, 1822 – June 25, 1898) was a U.S. representative from Kentucky. He also served as a commissioner for the Confederate government of Kentucky and in several posts in the Confederate States government during the American Civil War.

== Biography ==
Simms was born in Harrison County, Kentucky. He attended the public schools, and was graduated from the law department of Transylvania University in Lexington, Kentucky, in 1846. He was admitted to the bar in 1846 and commenced practice in Paris, Kentucky.

Simms served as a captain in the United States Army throughout the Mexican War, and was elected to the Kentucky House of Representatives from 1849 to 1851. He was elected as a Democrat to the Thirty-sixth Congress (March 4, 1859 – March 3, 1861), but unsuccessfully ran for reelection in 1860.

On October 21, 1861, Simms was appointed to the temporary rank of colonel in the Confederate States Army. He was appointed lieutenant colonel in the Provisional Army of the Confederate States on December 24, 1861, and was assigned to the First Battalion, Kentucky Cavalry. He resigned his commission on February 17, 1862, having been chosen as one of two senators from Kentucky to the Confederate States Congress. He was a member of the Senate of the First and Second Confederate Congresses and also served in President Davis' Cabinet.

After the war, he engaged in agricultural pursuits, and died on his estate, "Mount Airy," near Paris, Kentucky, on June 25, 1898. He is interred in Paris Cemetery.

== Notes ==
U.S. House of Representatives
Preceded by James Clay	Member of the U.S. House of Representatives from Kentucky's 8th congressional district 1859–1861	Succeeded by John Crittenden
Confederate States Senate
New constituency	Confederate States Senator (Class 1) from Kentucky; 1862–1865; Served alongside: Henry Burnett	Constituency abolished
