= Nimrod Lindsay Norton =

American politician (1830–1903)

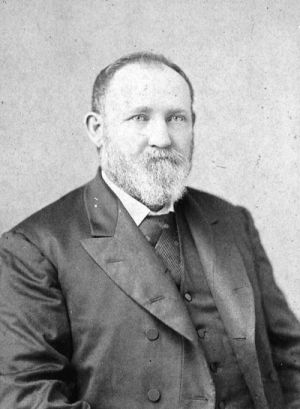

Representative of Confederate Congress from Missouri
- In office May 1864 – April 3, 1865

Personal details
- Born: April 18, 1830; Carlisle, Kentucky, US
- Died: September 28, 1903 (aged 73); Austin, Texas, US
- Resting place: Oakwood Cemetery, Austin, Texas, US
- Children: 8

Military service
- Branch/service: Army
- Rank: Colonel
- Battles/wars: American Civil War

Nimrod Lindsay Norton (April 18, 1830 – September 28, 1903) was an American politician.

== Biography ==
Norton was born on April 18, 1830, in Carlisle, Kentucky, to Hiram and Nancy Norton (née Spencer). He attended the Kentucky Military Institute. He married Mary C. Hall on October 27, 1853, having eight children together and moving to Missouri to farm. A colonel in the American Civil War, he led a company to defend northern Missouri.

In May 1864, he was elected a Missouri representative of the 2nd Confederate States Congress, serving until its dissolution on April 3, 1865. In 1867, his family moved to DeWitt County, Texas, then Salado. In 1873, he became a member of the National Grange, going on to survey 3,000,000 acres (4,700 sq mi) of land in the Llano Estacado, which would be sold to XIT Ranch. In 1800, he was one of three selected to select a design and location for the Texas State Capitol. On February 1, 1882, he and politician Joseph Lee broke ground for the building. Despite owning land in Montopolis, he lived in Salado while his family lived in Austin, until 1893, when he built a large home in Austin. He died on September 28, 1903, aged 73, in Austin. He is buried in the Oakwood Cemetery. His house in Salado, the Norton-Orgain House, was listed in the National Register of Historic Places in 1992.
