= John Porry Murray =

American politician

John Porry Murray (July 14, 1830 – December 21, 1895) was an American politician who served in the Confederate States Congress during the American Civil War.

Murray was born in Gainesboro, Jackson County, Tennessee. He was a state court judge in 1857 and represented the state in the Second Confederate Congress from 1864 to 1865.

Colonel of the 28th Tennessee Infantry Regiment and the 4th Tennessee Cavalry Regiment (Murray's).
