= James Shelton Dickinson =

American politician

James Shelton Dickinson (January 18, 1818 – July 23, 1882) was a Confederate States of America politician.

He was born in Spotsylvania County, Virginia, and later moved to Alabama. He was a member of the Alabama State Senate from 1853 to 1855 and represented the state in the Second Confederate Congress.
