= Arthur St. Clair Colyar =

American politician

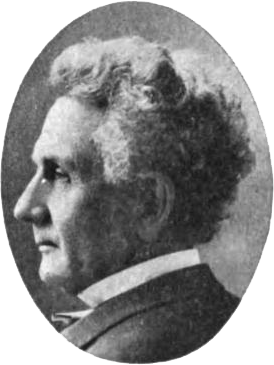
- Born: June 23, 1818; Washington County, Tennessee, U.S.
- Died: December 13, 1907 (aged 89); Nashville, Tennessee, U.S.
- Resting place: Mount Olivet Cemetery
- Occupation: Politician
- Parent: Alexander Colyar

Arthur St. Clair Colyar (June 23, 1818 – December 13, 1907) was an American lawyer, Confederate politician, and newspaper editor.

== Early life ==
Colyar was born on June 23, 1818, in Washington County, Tennessee. His father was Alexander Colyar. He moved to Franklin County, Tennessee, with his parents when he was 12.

Colyar studied the law with Micah Taul.

== Career ==
Colyar was admitted to the bar in 1846. He practised the law in Winchester, Tennessee, until 1861. During the American Civil War, Colyar represented the state in the Second Confederate Congress from 1864 to 1865.

After the war, Colyar resumed his legal practise in Winchester, but he moved to Nashville, Tennessee in 1867. He was a creditor and later president of the Tennessee Coal and Iron Company, which used mainly African-American leased convict labor to produce steel. He served as a member of the Tennessee House of Representatives in the 1870s, and unsuccessfully ran for Governor three times.

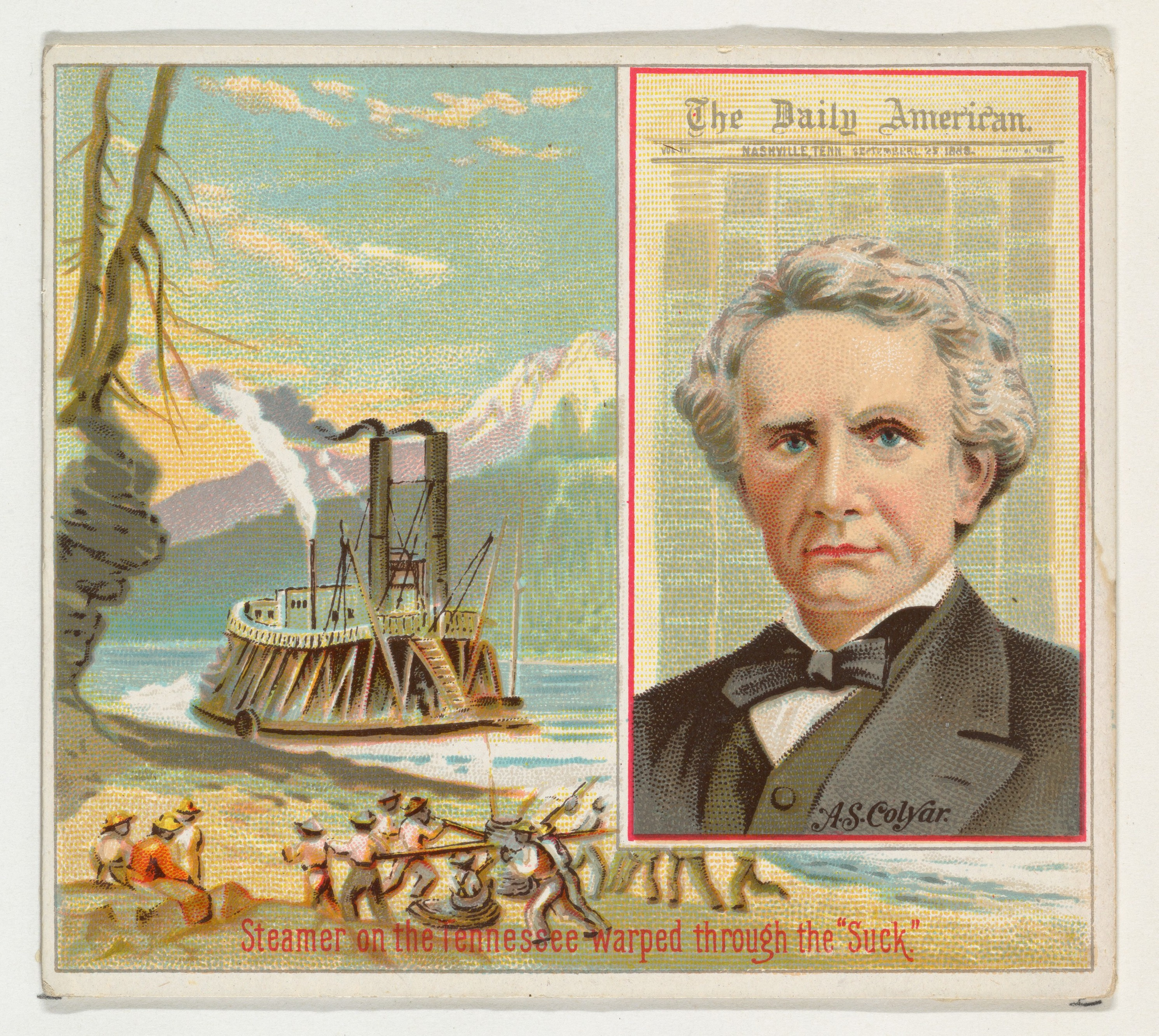
Allen & Ginter American Editors trading card series depiction of Colyar

Colyar became the editor of the Nashville American (later known as The Tennessean) in 1880. He subsequently served as the editor of The News, another newspaper based in Nashville, until he became the owner and editor of the American newspaper.

== Personal life and death ==
Colyar was a member of the Methodist Episcopal Church, South. He died on December 13, 1907, in Nashville, Tennessee. He was buried at the Mount Olivet Cemetery.

His niece was editor Viola Roseboro'.
