= John Troup Shewmake =

American politician

John Troup Shewmake (January 23, 1828 – December 1, 1898) was a lawyer and Confederate politician during the American Civil War.

Shewmake was born in Burke County, Georgia, and served in the Georgia State Senate in 1861 and again in 1879. He represented Georgia in the Second Confederate Congress from 1864 to 1865.
