= William Claiborne Owens =

American politician

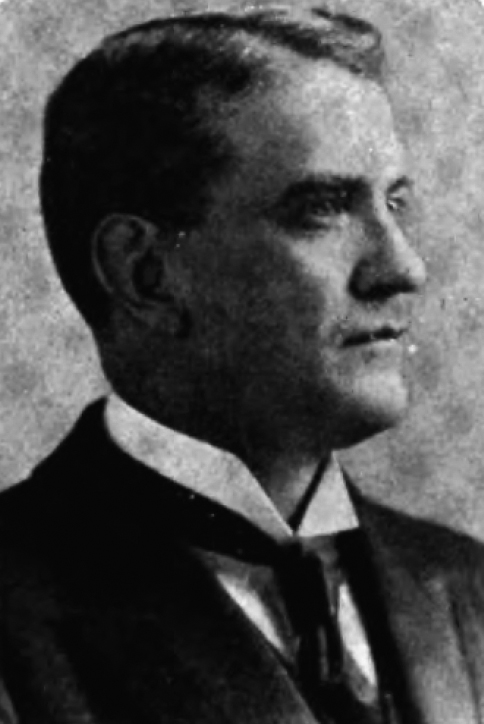
- Owens, c. 1896

Member of the U.S. House of Representatives from Kentucky's 7th district
- In office March 4, 1895 – March 3, 1897
- Preceded by: William Campbell Preston Breckinridge
- Succeeded by: Evan E. Settle

48th Speaker of the Kentucky House of Representatives
- In office November 28, 1881 – August 6, 1883
- Preceded by: Joseph M. Bigger
- Succeeded by: Charles Offutt

Member of the Kentucky House of Representatives from Scott County
- In office August 6, 1877 – August 1, 1887
- Preceded by: Daniel Lary
- Succeeded by: John E. Pack

Personal details
- Born: October 17, 1849 Scott County, Kentucky, US
- Died: November 18, 1925 (aged 76) Louisville, Kentucky, US
- Resting place: Georgetown Cemetery
- Party: Democrat; Republican
- Education: Columbia Law School
- Profession: Lawyer

Military service
- Allegiance: United States of America
- Branch/service: Kentucky volunteers
- Rank: Major
- Unit: Second Regiment
- Battles/wars: Spanish–American War

William Claiborne Owens (October 17, 1849 – November 18, 1925) was a U.S. Representative from Kentucky.

Born near Georgetown, Kentucky, Owens attended the common schools, also Kentucky Wesleyan College, Millersburg, Kentucky, Transylvania University, Lexington, Kentucky, and graduated from Columbia Law School, New York City, in 1872. He was admitted to the bar in the same year and commenced practice in Georgetown, Kentucky. He served as prosecuting attorney for Scott County, Kentucky from 1874 to 1877, when he resigned. He served as a member of the Kentucky House of Representatives 1877–1887 and served as speaker in 1882 and 1883. He served as a delegate to the 1892 Democratic National Convention.

Owens was elected as a Democrat to the Fifty-fourth Congress (March 4, 1895 – March 3, 1897). He was not a candidate for renomination in 1896. He became affiliated with the Republican Party in 1896. Major in the Second Regiment, Kentucky Volunteers, during the Spanish–American War in 1898. He moved to Louisville, Kentucky, in 1900 and resumed the practice of law. He died in Louisville, Kentucky, November 18, 1925. He was interred in Georgetown Cemetery, Georgetown, Kentucky.

U.S. House of Representatives
| Preceded by Joseph C. S. Blackburn | Member of the U.S. House of Representatives from Kentucky's 7th congressional district 1895–1897 | Succeeded by William C. Owens |
