= Anthony Martin Branch =

American politician

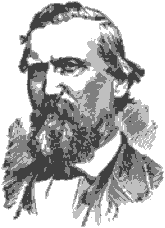

Member of the Second Confederate Congress
- In office 1864–1865
- Constituency: Texas

Member of the Texas Senate
- In office 1861

Member of the Texas House of Representatives
- In office 1859

Personal details
- Born: July 16, 1823 Buckingham County, Virginia
- Died: October 3, 1867 (aged 44) Huntsville, Texas
- Spouse: Amanda Smith (m. 1849)
- Education: Hampden–Sydney College
- Occupation: Politician, military officer

Anthony Martin Branch (July 16, 1823 – October 3, 1867) was a Texas politician who served in the Confederate States Congress during the American Civil War.

== Biography ==
Branch was born in Buckingham County, Virginia. He graduated from Hampden–Sydney College in 1842, and moved to Huntsville, Texas in 1847. He married Amanda Smith in 1849.

He was a member of the Texas House of Representatives in 1859 and the Texas Senate in 1861.

During much of the Civil War, Branch served in the Confederate States Army as a captain in Company A, the 21st Texas Cavalry (also known as the 1st Texas Lancers). He later represented Texas in the Second Confederate Congress in 1864 and 1865 until the end of the war.

Anthony Martin Branch died in Huntsville on October 3, 1867.
