= Stephen Heard Darden =

American politician (1816–1902)

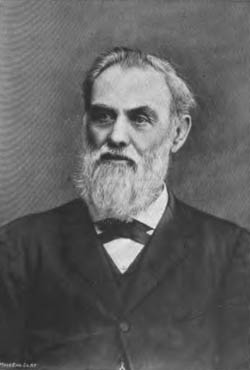

Texas Comptroller of Public Accounts
- In office 1874 - 1879
- Preceded by: Albert A. Bledsoe
- Succeeded by: William M. Brown

Member of the Second Confederate Congress
- In office November 21, 1864 - March 18, 1865
- Preceded by: John Allen Wilcox (Elect)
- Succeeded by: Abolished

Member of the Texas Senate from the 25th district
- In office November 4, 1861 - January 14, 1862
- Preceded by: Eggleston Dick Townes
- Succeeded by: Spencer Ford

Member of the Texas House of Representatives from the 62nd district
- In office November 7, 1853 - November 2, 1857
- Succeeded by: Albert Nelson Mills

Personal details
- Born: November 19, 1816 Mississippi
- Died: May 16, 1902 (aged 85) Wharton, Texas
- Resting place: Texas State Cemetery, Austin, Texas
- Party: Democratic
- Spouse: Catherine Mays Darden
- Education: Cumberland College

Military service
- Allegiance: Confederate States
- Branch/service: Confederate States Army
- Rank: Captain
- Unit: 4th Texas Infantry
- Battles/wars: American Civil War

Stephen Heard Darden (November 19, 1816 – May 16, 1902) was a prominent Texas politician who served in the Texas Senate and then as an officer in the Confederate Army during the American Civil War.

== Life ==
Mr. Darden is of English-Irish descent, and a native of Mississippi. His entrance into Texas was as a volunteer soldier from the State of Mississippi, under Captain David M. Fulton, in the year 1836. In 1841, he became permanently established as a citizen of Texas.

At the outbreak of the Civil War, Darden received a commission as a first lieutenant in Company A of the 4th Texas Infantry in what became widely known as the Texas Brigade. He was promoted to the rank of captain before resigning to the join the Second Confederate Congress.

Darden was elected to the Texas House of Representatives in the 62nd district from November 7, 1853 to November 2, 1857 and was elected to the Texas Senate in the 25th district from November 4, 1861 to January 14, 1862.

He was elected to represent the First Congressional District of Texas in the Second Confederate Congress from 1864 to 1865.

Darden was elected as a Democrat to be Texas Comptroller of Public Accounts from 1874 to 1879.
