= Thomas Lowndes Snead =

American politician

Thomas Lowndes Snead (January 10, 1828 – October 17, 1890) was a Confederate soldier and politician who served in the Confederate States Congress during the American Civil War.

== Biography ==
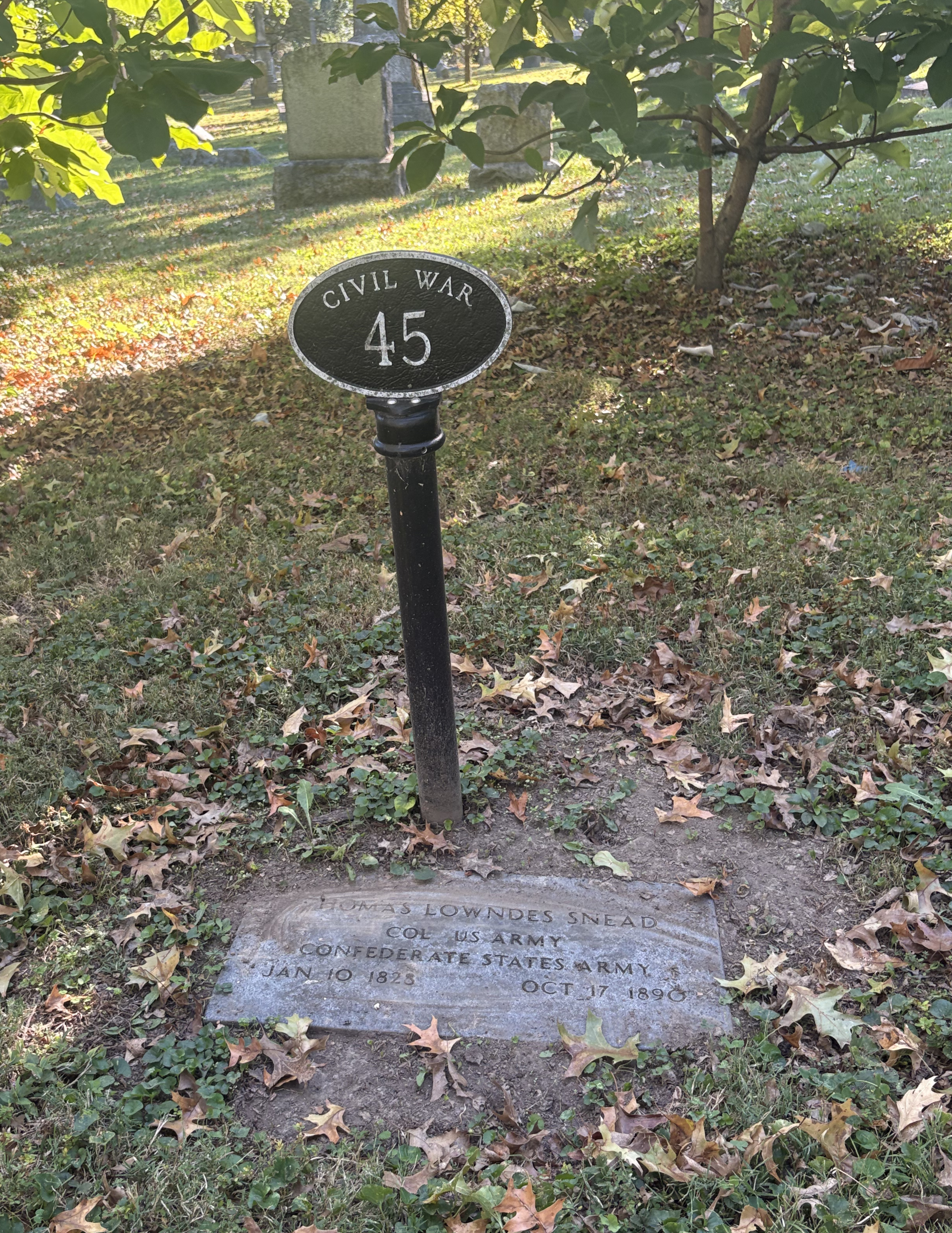
Snead's grave at Bellefontaine Cemetery

Born in Henrico County, Virginia, Snead graduated from Richmond College in 1846 and the University of Virginia in 1848 before studying law. He moved to St. Louis, Missouri, in 1850 and eventually became a newspaperman, serving as owner and editor of the St. Louis Bulletin from 1860 until February 1861. From February through early May 1861 Snead also acted as a (civilian) aide and secretary to Missouri Governor Claiborne Fox Jackson.

Upon the enactment of Missouri's May 1861 "Military Bill" Snead was appointed aide-de-camp to Governor Jackson and commissioned an officer in the Missouri State Guard. He participated in the Battles of Boonville, Carthage, Wilson's Creek, and Lexington during the fight against Union forces for control of the state. After the Missouri State Guard was merged into the Confederate Army, Snead served as chief of staff for General Sterling Price's Army of the West.

He was elected as a Representative from Missouri to the Second Confederate Congress in May, 1864.

After the end of the war, Snead moved to New York City and worked as an editor for the Daily News from 1865 to 1867. He was admitted to the New York bar association in 1866. He wrote a book, The Fight for Missouri, which was meant to be the first volume in a history of the war's trans-Mississippi theater. The book was published by Charles Scribner's Sons in 1886. Snead died suddenly of heart disease at his home on October 17, 1890, at age 62. His body was returned to St. Louis and buried there in Bellefontaine Cemetery. He was survived by his wife, one son, and one daughter.
