= Peter Singleton Wilkes =

American politician

Peter Singleton Wilkes (1827 – January 2, 1900) was a prominent Confederate politician who served in the Confederate States Congress during the American Civil War.

Wilkes was born in Maury County, Tennessee and later moved to Missouri. He represented that state in the Second Confederate Congress from 1864 to 1865. After the war, he moved to California where he was the law partner of David S. Terry.
