= Georgetown Cemetery (Georgetown, Kentucky) =

Cemetery in Georgetown, Kentucky

Coordinates: 38.1971°N 84.559°W

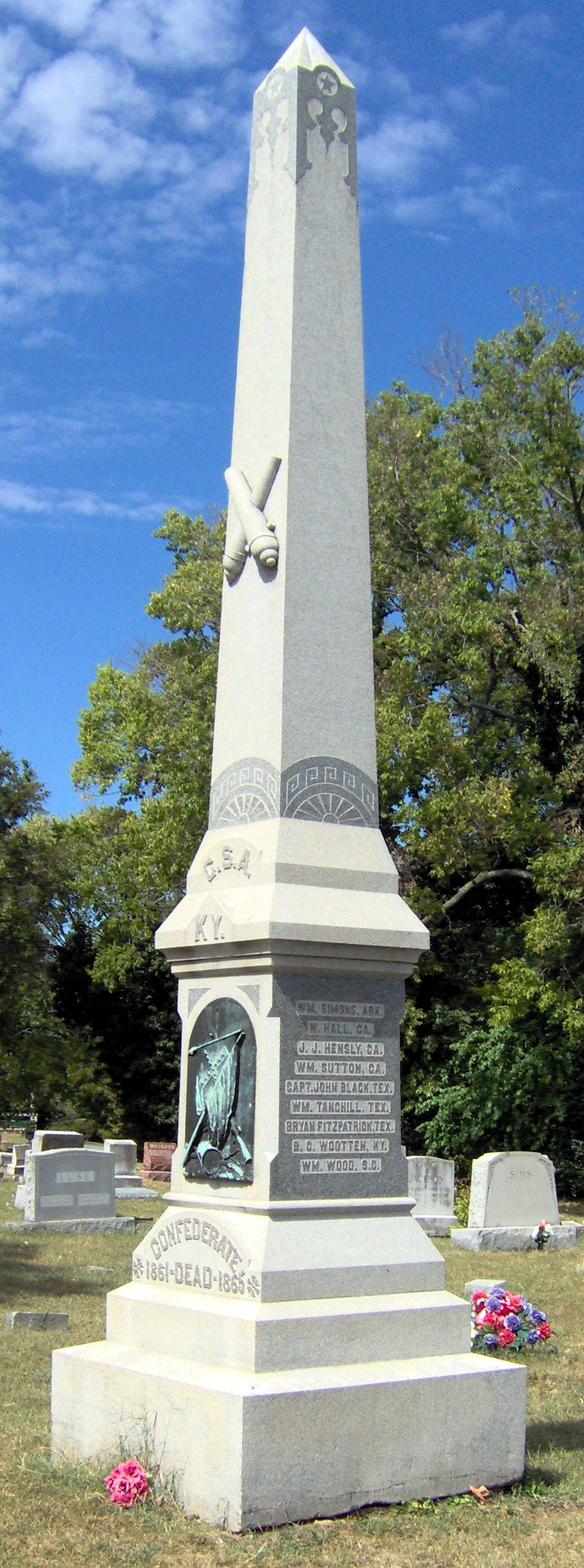
- Confederate Soldier Memorial.
- Interactive map of Georgetown Cemetery

Details
- Location: Georgetown, Kentucky

Georgetown Cemetery is a burial site located in Georgetown, Kentucky.

Georgetown Cemetery has a Confederate Soldier Memorial dedicated to Rebel soldiers that died during the American Civil War. Soldiers inscribed on the memorial are WM. Simons, W. Hall, J.J. Hensly, WM. Sutton, Capt. John Black, WM Tanchill, Bryan Fitzpatrick, B.C. Wootten, and WM Wood. Other notable people buried at the cemetery are U.S. Chess Champion, Jackson Showalter and two famous artists: Will Hunleigh a landscape artist, and equine artist, Edward Troye.

It also is the burial site of a murder victim known originally as "Tent Girl" who was later identified as Barbara Ann Hackmann Taylor in 1998.

== Notable burials ==
- Benjamin Franklin Bradley (1825–1897), American and Confederate politician
- J. Campbell Cantrill (1870–1923), U.S. Representative from Kentucky
- James E. Cantrill (1839–1908), Lieutenant Governor of Kentucky and judge
- Joseph Desha (1768–1842), Governor of Kentucky and U.S. Representative
- George W. Johnson (1811–1862), Confederate Governor of Kentucky
- James P. Lewis (1869–1942), Kentucky Secretary of State, politician and banker
- William Claiborne Owens (1849–1925), U.S. Representative from Kentucky
- James Fisher Robinson (1800–1882), Governor of Kentucky

== See also ==
- List of cemeteries in Kentucky
