= John Tillman Lamkin =

American politician

Member of the Confederate House of Representatives for Mississippi
- In office May 2, 1864 – March 18, 1865
- Preceded by: John J. McRae
- Succeeded by: Office abolished

Personal details
- Born: July 17, 1811 Augusta, Georgia
- Died: May 19, 1870 (aged 58) Holmesville, Mississippi

Military service
- Allegiance: Confederate States of America
- Unit: 33rd Mississippi Infantry
- Battles/wars: American Civil War

John Tillman Lamkin (also spelled John Tilman Lamkin) (July 17, 1811 – May 19, 1870) was a Southern United States politician who served in the Confederate States Congress during the American Civil War.

== Biography ==
Lamkin was born in Augusta, Georgia, the son of William and Keziah Hart Snead Lamkin. He married Thurza Ann Kilgore in Georgia on November 14, 1835. He was admitted to the Georgia Bar in 1833. He lived in Louisiana and Texas before settling in Pike County, Mississippi, and was admitted to the Mississippi bar in 1838.

Initially opposed to secession, Lamkin ran for a seat in the First Confederate Congress in 1861, but lost to John J. McRae. He then enlisted in the army, and was elected as captain of company E, in the 33rd Mississippi Infantry Regiment. In November 1863 he ran for Congress again, and was elected to serve in the House of Representatives of the Second Confederate Congress. In office from May 2, 1864 to March 18, 1865 he served on three committees: commerce, patents, post offices and post roads. Lamkin's region of Mississippi was less supportive of the war effort after 1863, and as their representative Lamkin opposed the Davis administration's proposals and supported every peace initiative that came before the Confederate Congress.

Lamkin resumed the practice of law after the war, and died in Pike County, Mississippi at the age of 58. He is buried in Woodlawn Cemetery in Summit, Mississippi.
