= Robert A. Hatcher =

American politician (1819–1886)

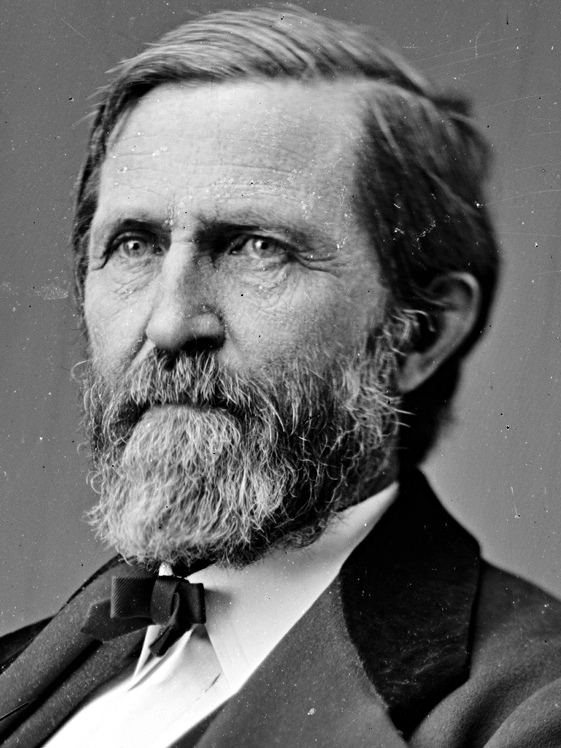
Image of Robert Anthony Hatcher

Robert Anthony Hatcher (February 24, 1819 – December 4, 1886) was an American lawyer, Confederate officer, and politician who served in both the Missouri House of Representatives and the United States House of Representatives. He also represented Missouri in the Second Confederate Congress during the American Civil War.

== Early life and education ==
Hatcher was born in Buckingham County, Virginia, on February 24, 1819. He received his early education in Lynchburg, Virginia, and studied law. After being admitted to the bar in Kentucky, he relocated to New Madrid, Missouri, in 1847, where he established a law practice and served as a circuit attorney.

== Political and military career ==
In 1850, Hatcher was elected to the Missouri House of Representatives, serving until 1851.

During the American Civil War, he joined the Confederate States Army, attaining the rank of major. He served as assistant adjutant general on the staffs of Generals Alexander P. Stewart and Henry D. Clayton.

In 1864, Hatcher was elected to the Second Confederate Congress, where he represented Missouri. He served on the Committees on Ordnance and Ordnance Stores and Enrolled Bills.

== U.S. House of Representatives ==
After the war, Hatcher resumed political life. A member of the Democratic Party, he was elected to represent Missouri's 4th congressional district in the United States House of Representatives, serving from March 4, 1873, to March 3, 1879.

He served on several committees, including Agriculture, Missouri Levees, and the Census, and was chairman of the Committee on Public Expenditures during the 45th Congress.

He declined to seek renomination in 1878 and returned to legal practice.

== Later life and death ==
After his congressional service, Hatcher resumed his law practice in Charleston, Missouri. He died there on December 4, 1886.

== Legacy ==
Hatcher is occasionally confused with Robert A. Hatcher, M.D., M.P.H. (1939–2020), a 20th-century physician and expert in reproductive health. The two are unrelated.

== See also ==
- List of United States representatives from Missouri
- Confederate States Congress
