= Lena Springs =

American politician (1883–1942)

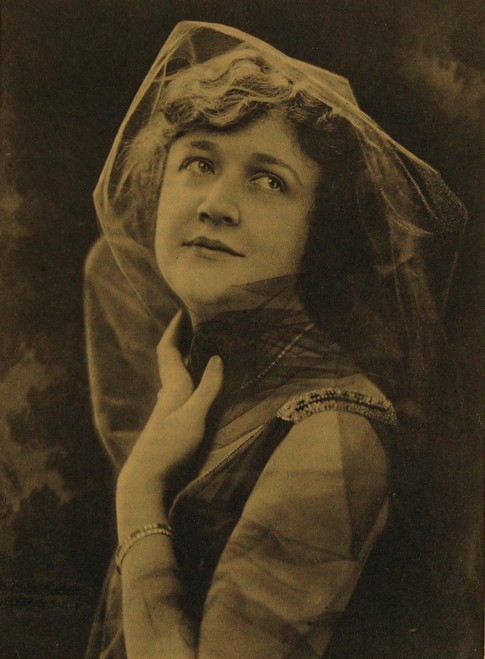
- Portrait of Springs

Personal details
- Born: Lena May Jones; March 22, 1883 Pulaski, Tennessee, U.S.
- Died: May 18, 1942 (aged 59) Manhattan, New York, U.S.
- Resting place: Maplewood Cemetery; Pulaski, Tennessee, U.S.
- Party: Democratic
- Spouse: Leroy Springs (m. 1913; died 1931)
- Education: Sullins College; Virginia College
- Occupation: Politician; educator
- Known for: Being the first woman placed in nomination for vice president of the United States
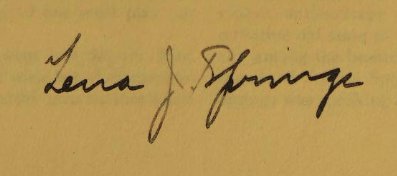
- Signature

Lena May Jones Wade Springs (March 22, 1883 - May 18, 1942) was the first woman placed in nomination for vice president of the United States at a political convention. She was nominated at the 1924 Democratic National Convention.

== Biography ==
A native of Pulaski, Tennessee, she attended public schools, followed by Sullins College and post-graduate work at Virginia College in Roanoke. She became chair of the English Department at Queens College in Charlotte, and married Col. Leroy Springs in 1913, a second marriage for both.

An enthusiastic supporter of women's rights, she became a Democratic National Committeewoman in 1922, and served as chair of the Credentials Committee in 1924. While her being supported for the vice presidential nomination was in essence a gesture, she received some votes in the election process, variously given as several, over 50, and 44.

She died on May 18, 1942, at her Plaza Hotel suite in Manhattan. She was buried in Maplewood Cemetery in Pulaski, Tennessee.
