= James McCallum (politician) =

American politician (1806–1889)

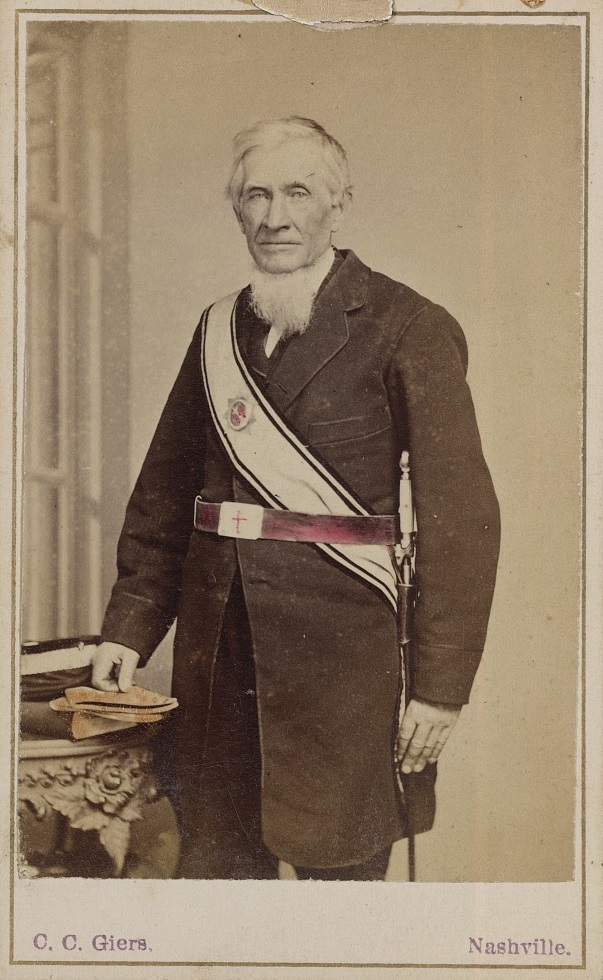
- Photograph of McCallum by Carl Giers, c. 1860–1870

Member of the Second Confederate Congress
- In office May 3, 1864 – March 18, 1865

Member of the Tennessee House of Representatives from the Giles County district
- In office 1861–1863

Personal details
- Born: October 1806 Robeson County, North Carolina, U.S.
- Died: September 16, 1889 (aged 82) Pulaski, Tennessee, U.S.
- Resting place: Maplewood Cemetery
- Party: Whig; Southern Unionist; Democratic (1861 and after)
- Spouse: Elizabeth Brown (m. 1828)
- Children: 11
- Occupation: Politician; lawyer; farmer

James McCallum (October 1806 – September 16, 1889) was a Confederate politician from Tennessee. He who served in the Confederate States Congress during the American Civil War.

== Early life ==
James McCallum was born on October 2 (or 3), 1806, in Robeson County, North Carolina, to Sarah (née Smith) and Daniel McCallum. He moved to Pulaski, Tennessee, with his family by the 1820s.

== Career ==
McCallum practiced law in Pulaski from 1842 to 1861. He was successively the clerk and master of the chancery court from 1842 to 1861. In the 1860 census, he was the owner of 25 slaves.

McCallum was originally a Whig and a Southern Unionist. Following the secession of Tennessee, he was a secessionist and Democrat. He represented Giles County in the Tennessee House of Representatives (34th General Assembly) from 1861 to 1863. He then represented Tennessee's 7th district in the Second Confederate Congress from May 3, 1864 to March 18, 1865. He served on the accounts, medical department, and the post offices and post roads committees. In January 1865, he introduced a resolution for the government seizure of all vital railroads. In February 1865, he introduced a resolution for the impression of all gold and silver plates and the doubling of taxes. He also introduced a resolution for the issue of treasury notes following a reduction in currency.

Following the Civil War, McCallum returned to Pulaski and continued to practice law. In 1870, he was a director of the Pulaski Savings Bank. He was also a farmer. He wrote Brief Sketch of the Settlement and Early History of Giles County (1876).

== Personal life ==
McCallum married Elizabeth Brown, daughter of Hugh Brown, of Maury County, Tennessee, on February 14, 1828. They had 11 children, two infants who died, Daniel Jerome, Katherine, Mary Elizabeth, James Joseph, Sarah Anne, William Hugh, John Neill, George Burder, and Neill Brown. He lived in Pulaski.

In 1828, he became a master mason in Elkton. In 1844, he was a Royal Arch Mason of the Lafayette chapter. From 1861 to 1862, he was Grand Master of the Grand Lodge of Tennessee. In 1871, he was eminent commander of the Pulaski Commandery 12 of the Knights Templar. He was a ruling elder of the Presbyterian Church and was a teacher and superintendent of the Sunday school.

McCallum died on September 16, 1889, in Pulaski. He was buried in Maplewood Cemetery in Pulaski.
