= Josiah Turner =

American politician

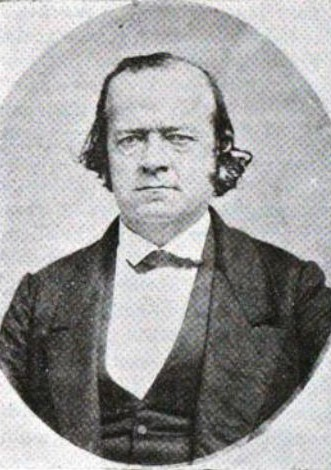
Turner

Josiah Turner, Jr. (December 27, 1821 – October 26, 1901) was an American lawyer, politician and newspaper editor from North Carolina.

Turner, one-time president of the North Carolina Railroad Company, was elected to represent Orange County in the North Carolina House of Representatives (1852, 1854 and 1879–1880) and in the North Carolina Senate (1858, 1860 and 1868).

Turner was a Whig before the collapse of that party in the late 1850s and was opposed to secession in the run-up to the American Civil War. After the war began, however, he served in the Confederate States Army, ran unsuccessfully for a seat in the Confederate House of Representatives in 1861 (losing to Archibald H. Arrington), and was elected to that body in 1863, serving in the Second Confederate Congress. There, he opposed the policies of President Jefferson Davis.

Turner was elected to the United States House of Representatives in 1865 as a "Conservative" but was not seated. Elected again to the state legislature after the war, he opposed Republican Gov. William W. Holden, who had Turner arrested in Hillsborough for allegedly assisting the Ku Klux Klan. Turner also used his newspaper, the Raleigh Sentinel, to attack Holden and his party. "Turner's crusade is considered to have been largely responsible for the recapture of the state legislature by the Democrats (then called Conservatives) and for the overthrow of Governor William W. Holden in 1870 and his impeachment in 1871," wrote William S. Powell. But, said Powell, Turner was "no financial wizard" and the paper ended up in the hands of the publishers of the Raleigh Observer. Eventually, they folded the paper into The News & Observer.

Turner was elected to the legislature in August 1878 and at the same time commenced another campaign for Congress, this time as an Independent Democrat with the support of some Republicans. But other Republicans could not stomach Turner due to his past reputation as, in the words of the New York Times, "the most violent opponent the Republicans ever had in this state." The resulting split in the opposition seemed to ensure a November victory for Democrat Joseph J. Davis.

Turner's wife, Sophia Devereux Turner, suffered from addiction to morphine. Turner had her committed in the North Carolina Hospital for the Insane in Raleigh in early 1878, in the hopes that the doctors there could cure her addiction. Her health began to fail in 1880. She was released from the asylum on September 13, 1880, and died at home soon after.

In 1880, "Turner's behavior [as a state legislator] became 'very erratic,' according to an account in A Biographical History of North Carolina from Colonial Times to the Present, published in 1906. 'He manifested a special antipathy to the speaker, Hon. John M. Moring, whom he denominated as a 'gander head,' and his conduct was so obstreperous that at length the body, worn out by his unruly and unseemly proceedings, was driven to expel him as a member,' reads the account." No other member of the North Carolina General Assembly was so removed from office again until Thomas E. Wright was expelled in 2008.

Turner's last major campaign was another run for Congress in 1884 as a Republican. He was defeated by William Ruffin Cox.
