= Williamson Simpson Oldham =

American judge

Williamson Simpson Oldham, Sr.

Confederate States Senator from Texas
- In office February 18, 1862 – March 18, 1865
- Preceded by: New constituency
- Succeeded by: Constituency abolished

Deputy from Texas to the Provisional Congress of the Confederate States
- In office February 4, 1861 – February 17, 1862
- Preceded by: New constituency
- Succeeded by: Constituency abolished

Personal details
- Born: June 19, 1813 Franklin County, Tennessee
- Died: May 8, 1868 (aged 54) Houston, Texas
- Resting place: Masonic Cemetery, Eagle Lake, Texas
- Party: Democratic

Williamson Simpson Oldham Sr. (June 19, 1813 – May 8, 1868) was an American politician who served in Arkansas state government, and as a Confederate States Senator from Texas from 1862 to 1865.

== Biography ==
Born in Franklin County, Tennessee, Oldham settled at Fayetteville, Arkansas, in 1835, was elected to the Arkansas House of Representatives in 1838 and 1842. He was elected as a justice of the Arkansas Supreme Court in 1842. In 1848 he resigned to run for Congress, but was defeated, thereafter moving to Austin, Texas. He represented Texas in the Provisional Congress of the Confederate States from 1861 to 1862, and was a senator in both the First and Second Confederate States congresses from 1862 to 1865. Oldham died on May 8, 1868.

== Legacy ==
Oldham County, Texas (established 1881), is named after him.

== In popular culture ==
In Harry Turtledove's 1994 alternative history novel, Guns of the South, a "Congressman Oldham" from Texas is mentioned as sponsoring a bill to re-enslave freedmen in a victorious Confederacy. Since the setting was the time of the 2nd Confederate States Congress, it is likely that Turtledove was referring to Senator Oldham.

Political offices
New constituency	Deputy from Texas to the Provisional Congress of the Confederate States; 1861–1862	Constituency abolished
Confederate States Senate
New constituency	Confederate States Senator (Class 3) from Texas; 1862–1865; Served alongside: Louis Wigfall	Constituency abolished
