= George Nelson Lester =

American politician

George Nelson Lester (March 13, 1824 – March 30, 1892) was a Confederate politician who served in the Confederate States Congress during the American Civil War.

Lester was born in Abbeville County, South Carolina. He served in the Georgia House of Representatives and raised the Forty First Regiment for the Confederate Army early in the Civil War. He served as a captan and was wounded in combat during the Battle of Perryville, losing an arm. He represented Georgia in the Second Confederate Congress from 1864 to 1865.

After the war he served as Georgia's Attorney General from 1890 to 1892. He died on March thirtieth, 1892 from a paralytic stroke.
