= Joseph Hubbard Echols =

Confederate politician (1816–1885)

Personal details
- Born: December 25, 1816 Wilkes County, Georgia, U.S.
- Died: September 23, 1885 (aged 68) Lexington, Georgia, U.S.
- Resting place: Beth-Salem Presbyterian Church Cemetery
- Spouse: Martha E. Smith (m. 1844)
- Occupation: Politician; farmer

Joseph Hubbard Echols (December 25, 1816 – September 23, 1885) was an American and Confederate politician.

== Biography ==
Joseph Hubbard Echols was born on December 25, 1816, in Wilkes County, Georgia.

Echols served in the Georgia House of Representatives. He was a member of the Georgia State Senate in 1861. He was elected to represent Georgia in the Second Confederate Congress from 1864 to 1865.

In 1854, Echols was elected president of the Methodist Female College in Madison, Georgia, succeeding James L. Pierce. He was a Methodist. He was also a planter.

Echols married Martha E. Smith, daughter of Robert S. Smith, on February 1, 1844. He died on September 23, 1885, at his home in Lexington, Georgia. He was buried in Beth-Salem Presbyterian Church Cemetery.
