= James Farrow (politician) =

American politician

James Hamilton Farrow (April 3, 1827 – July 3, 1892) was a Confederate States of America politician from South Carolina during the American Civil War.

He was born in Laurens, South Carolina, and served in the South Carolina State Legislature from 1856 until 1862. He served as a representative from South Carolina to the First Confederate Congress and Second Confederate Congress from 1862 to 1865. He also served as a delegate in the September 1865 South Carolina convention which officially repealed secession and reformed the state constitution. He was elected to the U.S. House of Representatives in November 1865, but the South Carolina delegation was not seated.

Confederate States House of Representatives
Preceded by none	C.S.A. Representative for South Carolina's 5th Congressional District; 1862–1865	Succeeded by none
