= Benjamin Franklin Bradley =

American and Confederate politician (1825–1897)

- Born: October 5, 1825; Georgetown, Scott County, Kentucky
- Died: January 22, 1897 (aged 71); Georgetown, Scott County, Kentucky
- Burial place: Georgetown Cemetery
- Military career
- Units: 1st Battalion, Kentucky Mounted Rifles
- Conflicts: American Civil War

Benjamin Franklin Bradley (October 5, 1825 – January 22, 1897) was a politician in the Confederate States of America during the American Civil War.

== Biography ==
Bradley was born in Georgetown in Scott County, Kentucky. He served in the United States Army in the Mexican War and then in the Confederate States Army in the Civil War when he was commissioned as the major of the 1st Battalion, Kentucky Mounted Rifles. He was elected to represent Kentucky in the Second Confederate Congress from 1864 to 1865.

After the war, Bradley returned to Kentucky and took the Oath of Allegiance. He resumed his legal career and served in the Kentucky State Senate in 1889.

He died in Georgetown, Kentucky, on January 22, 1897, and was buried in Georgetown Cemetery.
