= Samuel Augustine Miller =

American politician (1819–1890)

Samuel Augustine Miller (October 16, 1819 – November 19, 1890) was an American politician, member of the Confederate Congress and military officer in the Confederate States Army during the American Civil War.

== Biography ==
He was born to Reuben C. and Atlantic Ocean Walton Miller in Shenandoah County, Virginia. He married Helen M. Quarrier on July 27, 1845.

By the time of the Civil War, Miller was a resident of Charleston, Virginia (now West Virginia). During the war, he briefly served in the Confederate army as a major, serving as the assistant quartermaster of the 22nd Virginia Infantry (1st Kanawha). He was a delegate to the First and Second Confederate Congresses from Virginia's 14th Congressional District from February 1863 until the end of the war in 1865, succeeding Albert G. Jenkins, who had rejoined the army as a brigadier general.

After the war, Miller was a member of the West Virginia House of Delegates from Kanawha County in 1875.

He died in Parkersburg, West Virginia and was buried at Spring Hill Cemetery in Charleston. One regional newspaper, the Logan County Banner, said of him: "He practiced law at this place for many years and had a great many warm personal friends in Logan county. He was loved by all for his purity of character. May he rest in peace."

Preceded by Albert G. Jenkins	C.S.A. Representative for Virginia's 14th Congressional District; 1863–1865	Succeeded by none
