= David Funsten =

American politician

Member of the C.S. House of Representatives from Virginia's 7th district
- In office September 1863 – May 10, 1865
- Preceded by: "Extra Billy" Smith
- Succeeded by: Constituency abolished

Member of the Virginia House of Delegates from Warren and Clark Counties
- In office December 2, 1844-December 6, 1847
- Preceded by: Nathaniel Burwell Jr
- Succeeded by: James Castleman

Personal details
- Born: October 14, 1819 Clarke County, Virginia, US
- Died: 1866 (aged 46–47) Alexandria, Virginia, US
- Resting place: Ivy Hill Cemetery

Military service
- Allegiance: Confederate States of America
- Branch/service: Confederate States Army
- Years of service: 1861–63 (CSA)
- Rank: Colonel
- Unit: 11th Virginia Infantry
- Battles/wars: First Battle of Bull Run; Battle of Seven Pines

David Funsten (October 14, 1819 – April 6, 1866) was a Virginia lawyer, slaveholder and politician who served in the Virginia General Assembly and as a Congressman for the Confederate States of America during the American Civil War.

== Early and family life ==
Funsten was born in what became Clarke County, Virginia in his lifetime. He graduated from Princeton University in 1838. He inherited about 370 acres of land in the Shenandoah Valley, as well as slaves. He had a brother Orville Funston, who would also serve in the Virginia General Assembly and as a Confederate officer. In 1844 David Funsten married Susan Everard Meade from a prominent local family and the First Families of Virginia.

== Career ==
Admitted to the Virginia bar, Funston practiced in Winchester, the county seat of Frederick County, Virginia and in several adjoining counties.

Funston built a home about two miles southwest of White Post, Virginia. Voters in Clarke and Warren Counties elected him to the Virginia House of Delegates in 1844 and again in the election of 1845. He owned 14 slaves in Warren County, Virginia in 1850.

Funston moved to Alexandria, Virginia, in 1852 where his law practice could expand. In 1858 he took an extended trip to Europe, traveling across the Atlantic Ocean on a Cunard steamship, and did not return for the 1860 census other than its property schedules.

== Secession and Civil War ==
As a prominent citizen favoring secession, Governor John Letcher entrusted Funsten with conveying to then U.S. Army officer Robert E. Lee his invitation to become a general in the Confederate States Army. Funston's brother Orville Funston led a militia company that helped capture the U.S. arsenal at Harpers Ferry immediately after the Virginia Secession Convention of 1861 voted for secession on April 17, 1861. On May 16, 1861, Funsten traveled to Richmond and accepted a commission as Lt. Col. of the 11th Virginia Infantry. He returned to Alexandria, and soon supervised evacuation of confederate troops from its train depot. His wife returned to her family home "Benvenue" in the Shenandoah Valley. Although attached to Longstreet's Brigade, Funson saw little action at the First Battle of Manassas.

On May 23, 1862, he was promoted to full Colonel. However, during his first combat, at the Battle of Seven Pines. The wound ultimately crippled him, although he did not resign his commission until September 24, 1863.

Funsten was elected to the First Confederate Congress in a special election to replace William "Extra Billy" Smith, another Confederate officer who had resigned to return to his regiment. Funsten was then elected to serve in the Second Confederate Congress.

Funston died on April 6, 1866.
