= James Hervey Witherspoon Jr. =

American politician

James Hervey Witherspoon Jr. (March 23, 1810, in Lancaster County, South Carolina – October 3, 1865, in Lancaster, South Carolina) was a Confederate States of America politician. He was a colonel in the Confederate Army, and served as a representative from the first of six congressional districts of South Carolina in the Second Confederate Congress (1864-1865).

James Witherspoon was the son of James Witherspoon Sr. (1784-1842) who served as lieutenant governor of South Carolina (1826-1828). His brother Isaac Donnom Witherspoon (1803-1858) was also lieutenant governor of South Carolina. There is no information available about his youth or education. He must have studied law because he served as Judge for 16 years and he was commissioned in the Equity for 21 years. During the Civil War, he served as colonel of the 8th South Carolina State Reserves Troops.

James Witherspoon was married to Mary Elizabeth Jones Witherspoon (1811–1856). The couple had two children: Bartlett Jones Witherspoon (1832–1905) and Eliza Jones Witherspoon Wylie (1834–1909). He died on 3 October 1865 in Lancaster in South Carolina,
