= James Chrisman =

American politician

Member of the Kentucky House of Representatives from Wayne County
- In office August 2, 1869 – August 4, 1873
- Preceded by: Thomas J. Eades
- Succeeded by: Pearson Miller

Personal details
- Party: Democratic

James Stone Chrisman (September 14, 1818 – July 29, 1881) was an antebellum United States Representative from Kentucky and then a member of the Confederate States Congress during the American Civil War.

Chrisman was born in Monticello, Kentucky, where he attended the common schools. He engaged in agricultural pursuits and studied law. He was admitted to the bar in 1849 and commenced practice in Monticello.

Chrisman was an unsuccessful candidate for election to the Kentucky House of Representatives in 1845 and 1847. He was a delegate to the Kentucky constitutional convention in 1849 and was elected as a Democrat to the Thirty-third Congress (March 4, 1853 - March 3, 1855). He unsuccessfully contested the election of William C. Anderson to the Thirty-sixth Congress, losing in a race that at one time was tied but at the time Congress started session was decided by 3 votes. A later review would increase that to 169 votes.

During the Civil War, Chrisman served as a representative from Kentucky to the First and Second Confederate Congresses from 1862 to 1865. After the war, he served as a member of the Kentucky House of Representatives 1869–73. Later, he resumed the practice of law in Monticello, where he died in 1881. He was buried in a private cemetery on his farm.

U.S. House of Representatives
| Preceded by William T. Ward | Member of the U.S. House of Representatives from Kentucky's 4th congressional district March 4, 1853 – March 3, 1855 | Succeeded by Albert G. Talbott |
