= Theodore Legrand Burnett =

American politician (1829–1917)

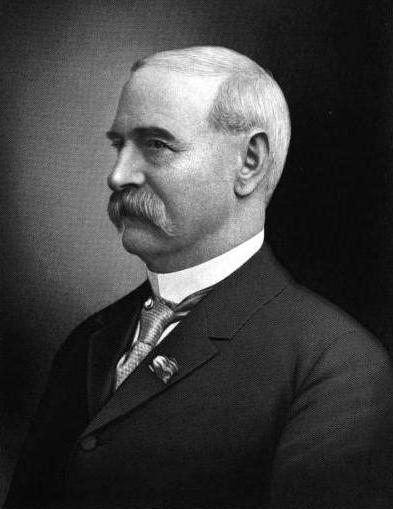
- Burnett in 1911

Member of the Confederate States Congress
- In office 1861–1865

Personal details
- Born: November 14, 1829; Spencer County, Kentucky, U.S.
- Died: October 30, 1917 (aged 87)
- Resting place: Cave Hill Cemetery, Louisville, Kentucky, U.S.
- Military career
- Allegiance: United States
- Branch: United States Army
- Battles / wars: Mexican–American War

Theodore Legrand Burnett (November 14, 1829 – October 30, 1917) was an American soldier, attorney and politician who served in the Confederate States Congress.

== Biography ==
Born November 14, 1829, in Spencer County, Kentucky, Burnett graduated from Transylvania University, with three degrees, including ones in liberal arts and law. He was admitted to the Kentucky Bar in 1846. After serving in the Mexican–American War, he practiced law in Taylorsville, being elected district attorney the same year. He later became a farmer and left law.

He represented Kentucky from 1861 to 1865 in the Provisional Confederate Congress, as well as the First and Second Confederate Congresses, serving as head of the Committee on Mileage through his service.

He died on October 30, 1917, aged 87, and is buried in Cave Hill Cemetery in Louisville, Kentucky. His obituary in The Louisville Times erroneously claimed he was the last surviving member of the Confederate Congress. Burrnett Avenue in Louisville's Old Louisville neighborhood is named for him.
