= Caleb Claiborne Herbert =

Confederate politician (1814–1867)

Caleb Claiborne Herbert (1814 – July 5, 1867) was a Confederate politician during the American Civil War.

He was born in Goochland County, Virginia, and later moved to Texas. He served in the Texas Senate from 1857 to 1859. An ardent supporter of states' rights, Herbert represented Texas in the First Confederate Congress and the Second Confederate Congress from 1862 to 1865.
