= David Williamson Carroll =

American politician (1816–1905)

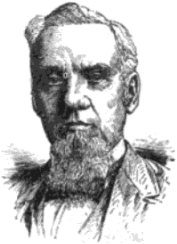

Member of the Confederate States Congress
- In office January 11, 1865 – March 18, 1865
- Preceded by: Augustus Hill Garland
- Succeeded by: Constituency abolished

Member of the Arkansas General Assembly
- In office 1850

Personal details
- Born: March 11, 1816 Baltimore, Maryland, U.S.
- Died: June 24, 1905 (aged 89) Little Rock, Arkansas, U.S.
- Resting place: Calvary Cemetery, Little Rock, Arkansas, U.S.
- Spouse: Melanie Scull (m. 1838)
- Education: St. Mary's College
- Occupation: Lawyer, politician

David Williamson Carroll (March 11, 1816 – June 24, 1905) was an American politician who served in the Confederate army and congress during the American Civil War.

== Biography ==
Carroll was born in Baltimore, Maryland. He was a lineal descendant of Daniel Carroll and studied at St. Mary's College of Baltimore. He moved to Arkansas in 1836 and established a legal practice. He married Melanie Scull on February 11, 1838. In 1850, he was elected to the Arkansas state legislature.

During the American Civil War, he enlisted in Company K, 18th Arkansas Infantry with the rank of captain. He rose to become the colonel of the regiment. Later, he represented Arkansas in the Confederate congress.

After the war, he served a state court judge from 1866 to 1868. He died at his home in Little Rock, Arkansas, and was buried in that city's Calvary Cemetery.

Confederate States House of Representatives
Preceded by Augustus Hill Garland	Member of the C.S. House of Representatives from Arkansas; 1865	Succeeded by Constituency abolished
