= Robert Johnston (American politician) =

American politician

Robert Johnston (October 14, 1818 – November 6, 1885) was a politician serving in the Congress of the Confederate States of America during the American Civil War.

Johnston was born in Rockbridge County, Virginia. He served in the antebellum Virginia state legislature and later represented his state in the Provisional Confederate Congress, the First Confederate Congress and the Second Confederate Congress. He represented Virginia's 15th district, comprising the counties of Lewis, Wood, Pleasants, Tyler, Ritchie, Doddridge, Upshur, Randolph, Webster, Tucker, Barbour, Harrison, Taylor, Gilmer, and Calhoun, all of which are now part of West Virginia. By mid-1861 most of these counties were either under Union military occupation or had no county government, so voting was done by refugees or soldiers. He later served as a judge in Virginia from 1880 to 1885.

Johnston died of tuberculosis at Harrisonburg, Virginia, and was buried there in Woodbine Cemetery.
