= Thomas Charles Fuller =

American judge (1832–1901)

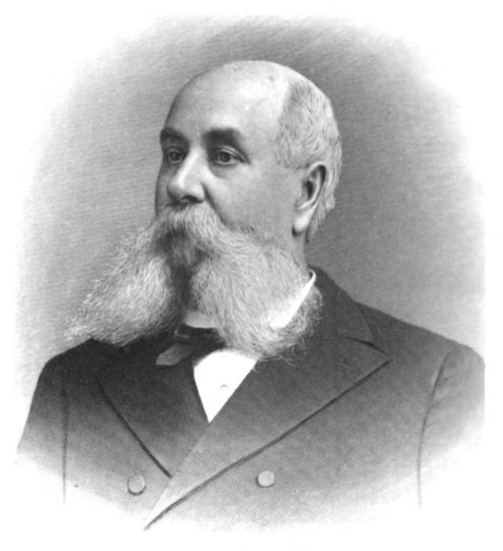

Member of the Confederate House of Representatives
- In office 1864–1865
- Constituency: Fayetteville

Personal details
- Born: February 27, 1832 Fayetteville, North Carolina
- Died: October 20, 1901 (aged 69) Raleigh, North Carolina
- Resting place: Historic Oakwood Cemetery
- Party: Whig
- Spouse: Caroline Douglas Whitehead (m. 1857)
- Children: 11
- Occupation: Jurist, politician

Thomas Charles Fuller (February 27, 1832 – October 20, 1901) was a prominent politician of the Confederate States of America and later a federal judge.

== Biography ==
Born in Fayetteville, North Carolina, he was the youngest of three children born to Thomas, a merchant, and Catherine Eleanor (Raboteau) Fuller. After his father's premature death, Fuller's mother moved the family to Louisburg, where her husband was originally from. Fuller attended the University of North Carolina from 1849 to 1851 and later returned to Fayetteville and established a law practice there with his brother Bartholomew.

He married Caroline Douglas Whitehead on November 5, 1857, and they had 11 children.

Upon the outbreak of the American Civil War he served as a colonel in the Confederate Army. He represented North Carolina in the Second Confederate Congress from 1864 to 1865 as a Whig.

In 1890, President Benjamin Harrison appointed Fuller as a justice of the United States Court of Private Land Claims.

He died in Raleigh on October 20, 1901. He was buried in Historic Oakwood Cemetery.
