= Eli Metcalfe Bruce =

American politician (1828–1866)

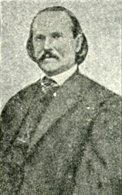

Representative to the Confederate Congress
- In office 1862–1865
- Preceded by: office established
- Succeeded by: office abolished

Personal details
- Born: February 22, 1828 Fleming County, Kentucky
- Died: December 15, 1866 (aged 38) New York City, New York
- Spouse: Elizabeth Sally Withers
- Profession: Entrepreneur

Eli Metcalfe Bruce (February 22, 1828 – December 15, 1866) was a philanthropist and a Representative from Kentucky in the First and Second Confederate Congresses. He was the principal financier of the Confederate government of Kentucky during the Civil War.

== Early life ==
Eli Metcalfe Bruce was born near Flemingsburg, Kentucky, the son George S. and Sabina Metcalfe Bruce. He was educated at the local schools until 1847 when he began working at a dry goods store in Maysville, Kentucky. Shortly thereafter, he relocated to Northern Kentucky, where he worked at a pork packing factory owned by his uncle in Cincinnati, Ohio.

In 1853, Bruce married Elizabeth Sally Withers, and the couple had three children. The following year, he and his uncle opened an iron furnace business near Terre Haute, Indiana. In 1859, he sold his interest in the iron furnace company and purchased several pork packing plants along the Mississippi, Missouri, and Wabash Rivers. These entrepreneurial endeavors left Bruce a wealthy young man.

== Civil War ==
Near the outbreak of the Civil War, Bruce sold all of his enterprises in the north and moved to the south. A Confederate sympathizer, Bruce attended a secession convention in Russellville, Kentucky, in November 1861, and was elected to the legislative council of the Commonwealth's Confederate shadow government. When Kentucky was admitted to the Confederacy in December 1861, Bruce was elected to one of the Commonwealth's ten congressional seats.

He personally financed many of the supply needs of Kentucky's Orphan Brigade. His work in negotiating prisoner exchanges for this unit led to his being asked to negotiate such exchanges for the entire Confederate States Army.

Near the end of the war, Bruce and Jefferson Davis fled the Confederate capital at Richmond, Virginia. He was later captured in Georgia, but with the end of the war, he was released and established an office in Augusta, Georgia, with the intent of helping Confederate soldiers return home. On May 10, 1865, he published an open letter offering to pay the educational expenses of any Confederate soldier who had lost an arm or leg in the war. All told, it was estimated that Bruce contributed $400,000 for the relief of Confederate soldiers. He was pardoned of any wrongdoing with regards to his support of the Confederacy by President Andrew Johnson.

== Later life and death ==
Bruce financed the merger of two Louisville, Kentucky, newspapers – The Courier and The Journal – into The Courier-Journal. He later moved to New York City, New York, where he became a cotton broker and opened a hotel for the use of former Confederate soldiers. He continued to augment his fortune through wise investments, and shortly after the war, an abandoned South Carolina gold mine in which he had invested struck a new vein.

Bruce died of heart disease on December 15, 1866, and was buried in Linden Grove Cemetery in Covington, Kentucky. In 1917, his body was exhumed and reburied near his wife and daughter in Highland Cemetery in Fort Mitchell, Kentucky. The Northern Kentucky chapter of Sons of Confederate Veterans is named in his honor.

== See also ==
- Kentucky in the American Civil War
