= James Thomas Leach =

American politician

James Thomas Leach (c. 1805 – March 28, 1883) was a Confederate politician who served in the Confederate States Congress during the American Civil War.

Leach was born in Johnston County, North Carolina, and was a first cousin of James Madison Leach. He served in the North Carolina state legislature in 1858 and represented the state in the Second Confederate Congress from 1864 to 1865.
