= James William Moore =

American judge (1818–1877)

Representative to the Confederate Congress
- In office 1862–1865
- Preceded by: Position established
- Succeeded by: Position abolished

Personal details
- Born: February 12, 1818 Montgomery County
- Died: September 17, 1877 (aged 59) Mount Sterling, Kentucky

James William Moore (February 12, 1818 – September 17, 1877) was an American judge and politician from Montgomery County, Kentucky. He represented Kentucky in the Confederate States Congress during the American Civil War.

Moore was born in Montgomery County, Kentucky. Moore served as a Kentucky state court judge from 1851 to 1858. In 1861 he became a delegate to the Kentucky Secessionist Convention and represented the state in the First Confederate Congress and the Second Confederate Congress from 1862 to 1865. James Moore died on September 17, 1877, and was buried in Machpelah Cemetery.
