= James Farrow (trader) =

Flax and gunpowder trader

James Farrow (c. 1800 – 3 November 1880) was a flax and gunpowder trader known in Māori as Hemi. He was the first white trader who permanently settled in Tauranga, New Zealand.

== Early life ==
Born in London, England in 1800 to parents Catherine and Edward Farrow. Edward was a whitesmith, a person who makes articles out of metal, especially tin. His brother Daniel was also in the flax trading business. Farrow first came to New Zealand in 1825 in Auckland, then in 1829 Farrow arrived in Tauranga was the first permanent trader in the Bay of Plenty. He obtained flax fibre for Australian merchants in exchange for muskets and gunpowder. Soon Phillip Tapsell arrived in Maketu in late 1830 as a Flax trader for Te Arawa became his trading agent.

== Later life ==
In 1861 Farrow married Anne Phillips. Farrow left Otumoetai before the Waikato war spread to Tauranga in 1864. He retired to Auckland, where he died at his residence in Dublin Street, Saint Marys Bay, on 3 November 1880 at the age of 80. His wife Anne died in 1882 and his brother Daniel in 1885.
