= Henry English Read =

American politician

Henry English Read (December 25, 1824 – November 9, 1868) was an American politician from Kentucky who served in the Confederate States Congress during the American Civil War. Read was born in LaRue County, Kentucky. He represented the state in the First Confederate Congress and the Second Confederate Congress. Three years after the war, he killed himself. Interment was in the Elizabethtown City Cemetery in Elizabethtown, Kentucky.

== Obituary ==
General Henry English Read's obituary from the Daily Ledger (New Albany, IN Newspaper - Across from Louisville, KY)

The article states:

General Henry English Read of Louisville, Shoots Himself, Dies at Court Place (Header)

The Louisville papers report the death, by his own hands, of General E. Read, a prominent lawyer of that city which occurred about 5:00 yesterday afternoon.It is stated that a few moments before that time, General Read entered the law office of his former partner, Bryan H. Allen Esq, on Sixth Street and called for some writing materials. These were promptly furnished, and the apartment vacated sept save himself. In a few moments the loud report of a pistol was heard and several persons returned to the room. There, to their utter consternation, they found General Read lying dead upon a lounge with a Derringer pistol grasped in one hand, while the other was folded upon his chest. The ball had penetrated the right temple, passed through the brain and entered the wall.

Upon the table was the following note, unfolded and unsealed. It was written without the slightest evidence of temor, in unusually free and manly chirography and gives no idex to the frame of the unfortunate gentleman. The sad, piteous, heartbroken and yet bold utterance of the letter reveals how a brave man can be reduced to such a dreadful alternative.

Contents of the letter:

"My life has been one of varied success from the creation of my existence to the present. I have been the farmer's son, the mechanic, the soldier, the officer, the professional gentleman, in all of which I am confident that I am entitled to respectful consideration.

The Pecuniary want of my life has at all times been embarrassed, which perhaps is the cause of my discontenture - at least as to render my life unhappy.

So with the fresh memory of the honor of my native State, and with love and kindness towards my family, I bid farewell. H.E. Read"

Intelligence of the heart - sickening catastrophe was soon bruited about and hundreds crowed about the premises. Coroner Moore summoned a jury and returned a veredict in accordance with the facts.

A few days ago, General Read was in this city on business and stopped at the Del'auw House. He appeared to be in good spirits, laughing and joking with his friends about the result of the election in progress. He was a generous, kind hearted man, and beloved by all who knew him. He was a native of Kentucky, and who won distinction in the Mexican War as a lad. During the late war (Civil War) he was a General of the Confederate Army. He leaves a wife and several small children to mourn their loss.
