= Rufus King Garland Jr. =

American politician

Rufus K. Garland, Jr.

Delegate to 1874 Arkansas Constitutional Convention
- In office July 14, 1874 – September 7, 1874
- Constituency: Nevada County

Member of the Confederate House of Representatives from Arkansas's 2nd district
- In office November 8, 1864 – March 18, 1865
- Preceded by: Grandison Royston
- Succeeded by: constituency abolished

Member of the Arkansas House of Representatives from the Hempstead County district
- In office November 1, 1858 – May 6, 1861
- Preceded by: D. Block

Personal details
- Born: May 22, 1830 Tipton County, Tennessee
- Died: December 12, 1886 (aged 56) Nevada County, Arkansas
- Resting place: Prescott, Arkansas
- Party: Whig (pre-1861); Democratic (1861-1879); Greenback (after 1879)
- Spouse: Isabella Sarah Walker (m. 1853)
- Relatives: Augustus Garland (brother)
- Education: St. Joseph’s College
- Profession: Farmer, politician

Military service
- Allegiance: CSA
- Branch/service: Confederate States Army
- Years of service: 1861-c. 1862
- Rank: Captain
- Commands: 4th Arkansas Infantry Regiment, Company B "Hempstead Hornets"
- Battles/wars: American Civil War

Rufus King Garland Jr. (May 22, 1830 – December 12, 1886) was a farmer, lawyer, and politician in Arkansas. He represented Hempstead County, Arkansas in the Arkansas House of Representatives before the American Civil War.

He represented Hempstead County at the 1861 Arkansas Secession Convention alongside Alfred Carrigan.

He served in the Confederate Congress and was a delegate to the 1874 Arkansas Constitutional Convention.

He was born in Tipton County, Tennessee, the older brother of Augustus Garland. He moved to Arkansas and served in the state legislature from 1858 to 1861. He served in the Confederate States Army and represented the state in the Second Confederate Congress from 1864 to 1865. He was the Greenback Party's candidate for Governor in 1882.

He died near Prescott, Arkansas.
