= Robert Henry Whitfield =

American Confederate politician

Robert Henry Whitfield (September 14, 1814 – October 5, 1868) was a prominent Confederate politician.

He was born in Nansemond County, Virginia, in what is today Suffolk, Virginia on September 14, 1814. He was a delegate to the Virginia Secession Convention from Isle of Wight County, Virginia. He represented the state in the Second Confederate Congress. He died in Smithfield, Virginia on October 5, 1868.
