= George Washington Ewing =

American politician (1808–1888)

Representative to the Confederate Congress
- In office 1861–1865
- Preceded by: office established
- Succeeded by: office abolished

Member of the Kentucky House of Representatives from Logan County
- In office August 1, 1859 – December 21, 1861
- Preceded by: Robert Browder
- Succeeded by: Jonathan R. Bailey
- In office 1842–1844

Personal details
- Born: November 29, 1808 Adairville, Kentucky
- Died: May 20, 1888 (aged 79) Logan County, Kentucky

George Washington Ewing (November 29, 1808 – May 20, 1888) was an American Confederate politician from Kentucky. He was a Confederate delegate then representative during the Civil War.

Ewing was born in Adairville, Kentucky, and educated in the common schools of Logan County. He studied law, and after passing the bar exam, he became an attorney.

He served as a member of the Kentucky House of Representatives from Logan County from 1842 to 1844, and again from 1859 to 1861.

He went on to represent the state in the Provisional Confederate Congress, the First Confederate Congress, and the Second Confederate Congress from 1861 to 1865.

Ewing died near Adairville on May 20, 1888. He was buried in the old Red River Meeting House Cemetery in Logan County, Kentucky.
