= George Washington Triplett =

American politician (1809–1894)

Member of the Confederate States Congress
- In office 1864–1865
- Preceded by: John Watkins Crockett Jr.
- Succeeded by: Office abolished
- Constituency: 2nd Kentucky District

Member of the Kentucky Senate
- In office 1848–1852

Member of the Kentucky House of Representatives
- In office 1840–1842

Personal details
- Born: February 18, 1809 Franklin County, Kentucky, U.S.
- Died: June 25, 1894 (aged 85) Owensboro, Kentucky, U.S.
- Resting place: Rosehill Elmwood Cemetery
- Party: Whig
- Spouse: Amelia A. Head (m. 1827)
- Children: 11
- Occupation: Politician; military officer; judge; educator; surveyor; farmer

George Washington Triplett (February 18, 1809 – June 25, 1894) was a Confederate politician who served in the Confederate States Congress during the American Civil War. Prior to the war, he served in the Kentucky House of Representatives and the Kentucky Senate.

== Early life ==
George Washington Triplett was born on February 18, 1809, in Franklin County, Kentucky. He attended local county schools.

== Career ==
In 1827, Triplett taught school in Scott County and continued for six years. He worked as deputy county surveyor for two or three years. In 1833, he moved to Daviess County and surveyed and farmed near Owensboro. He was also the head of a school in Owensboro for nine months. He worked as county surveyor for 17 years. From 1836 to 1840, he had a wood yard at Bon Harbor on the Ohio River.

In 1840, Triplett was a Whig. He was elected to the Kentucky House of Representatives. He served for three terms. He was elected to the Kentucky Senate, representing Daviess and Henderson counties, in 1848 and served until 1852.

In May 1861, Triplett joined the Confederate States Army and was a captain in the 1st Kentucky Cavalry Regiment. He was promoted to major in the quartermaster corps under Benjamin Hardin Helm. He also served under Generals Roger Hanson, Earl Van Dorn and Nathan B. Forrest. He was chief quartermaster under Major General John C. Breckinridge.

In February 1864, Triplett was appointed representative of the 2nd Kentucky district in the Second Confederate Congress, succeeding John Watkins Crockett Jr. He served until 1865. In 1866, he was elected judge of Daviess County and served until September 1, 1878.

== Personal life ==
Triplett married Amelia A. Head of Scott County on October 18, 1827. He had six sons and five daughters, Robert S., Joseph F., John H., George W. Jr., Willie, Daniel, Mary, Sallie, Margaret, Amelia and Octavia. He moved to Owensboro on October 30, 1833. After returning home from the war in 1865, he found his house burned and property destroyed.

Triplett died on June 25, 1894, in Owensboro. He was buried at Rosehill Elmwood Cemetery.
