= 1st Confederate States Congress =

1862–1864 Confederate meeting

- Seal of the Confederate States

- Flag of the Confederate States (1863–1865)

Type
- Type: Bicameral
- Houses: Senate; House of Representatives

History
- Founded: February 18, 1862
- Disbanded: February 17, 1864
- Preceded by: Provisional Congress
- Succeeded by: 2nd

Leadership
- Senate President: Alexander H. Stephens
- Senate Pres. pro tem: R. M. T. Hunter
- House Speaker: Thomas S. Bocock

Meeting place
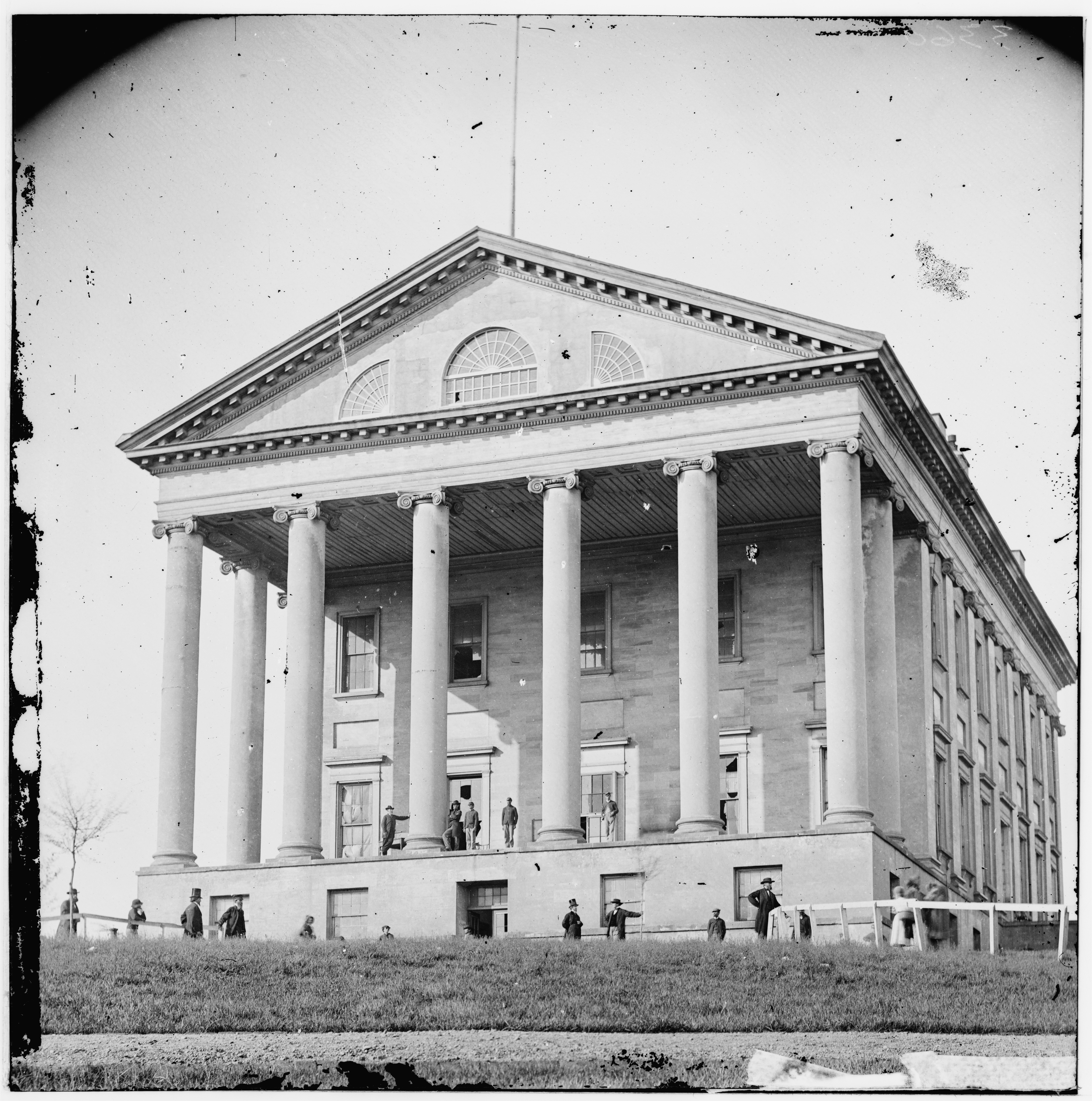
- Virginia State Capitol; Richmond, Virginia; Confederate States of America

Constitution
- Constitution of the Confederate States

The 1st Confederate States Congress, consisting of the Confederate States Senate and the Confederate States House of Representatives, convened between February 18, 1862, and February 17, 1864. This assembly took place during the first two years of Jefferson Davis's presidency, convening at the Virginia State Capitol in Richmond, Virginia.

== Sessions ==
The following sessions were held during the period February 18, 1862, and February 17, 1864, at the Virginia State Capitol in Richmond, Virginia.

- 1st Session – February 18, 1862 to April 21, 1862
- 2nd Session – August 18, 1862 to October 13, 1862
- 3rd Session – January 12, 1863 to May 1, 1863
- 4th Session – December 7, 1863 to February 17, 1864

== Leadership ==
=== Senate ===
Senate President

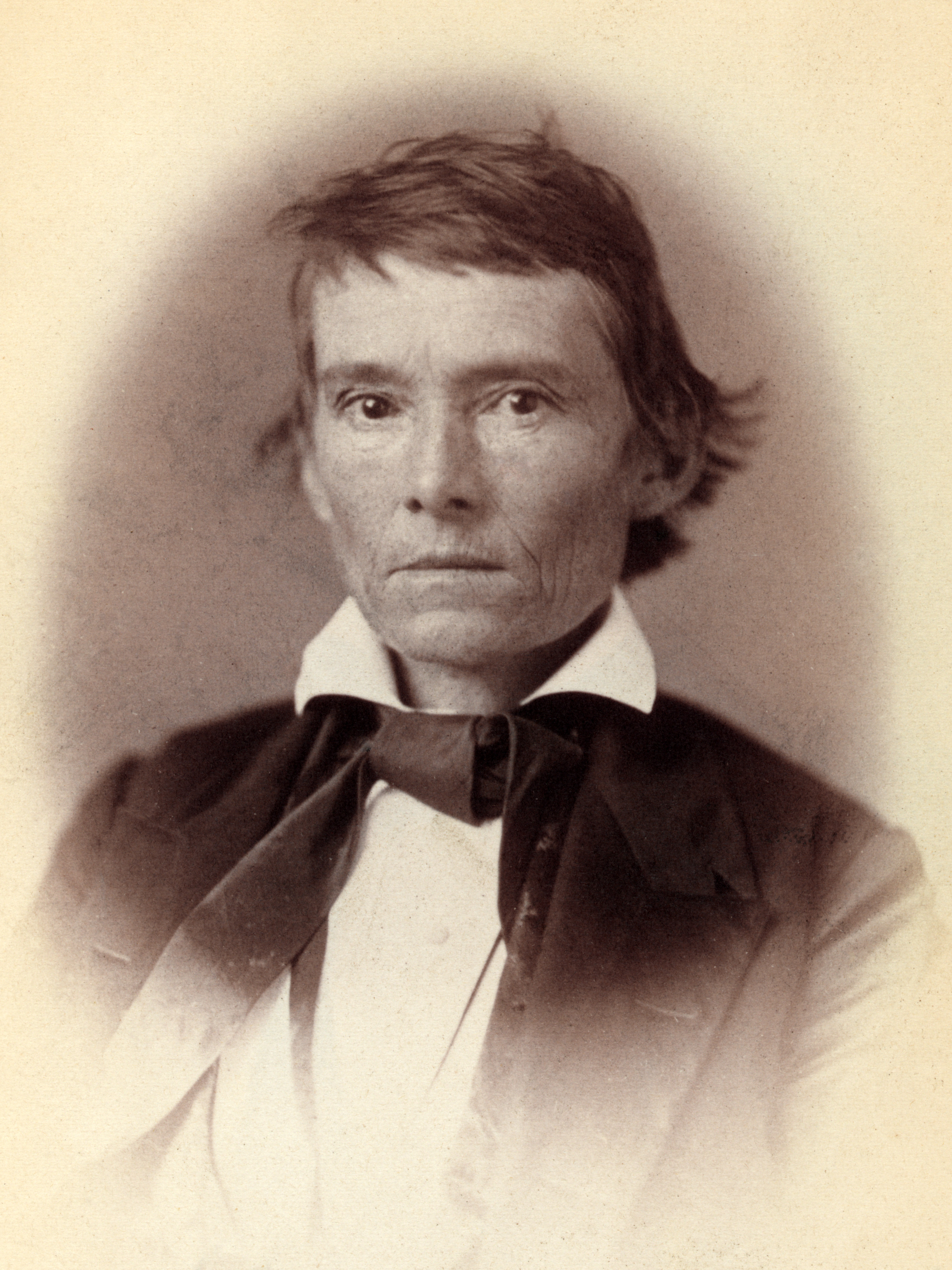
Alexander H. Stephens

President pro tempore

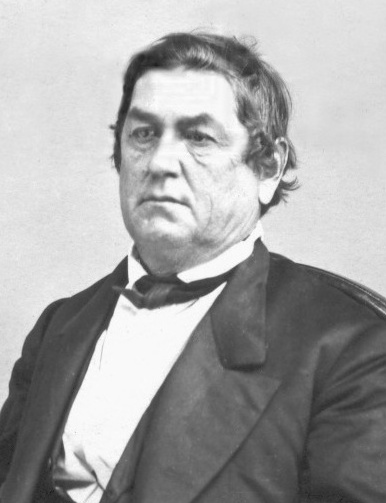
R. M. T. Hunter

- President: Alexander H. Stephens
- President pro tempore: R. M. T. Hunter

=== House ===
House Speaker

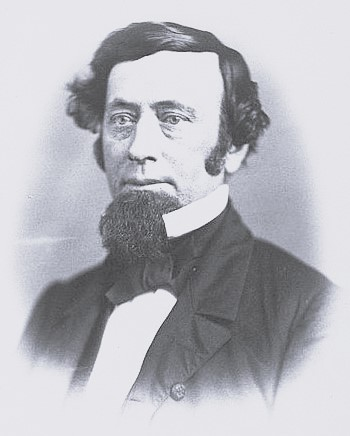
Thomas S. Bocock

- Speaker: Thomas S. Bocock

== Officers ==
=== Senate ===
- Secretary: James H. Nash, South Carolina
- Assistant Secretary: Edward H. Stephens, Virginia
- Journal Clerk: C. T. Bruen, Virginia
- Recording Clerk: Henry H. Hubbard, Mossy Creek, Tennessee
- Sergeant-at-Arms: Lafayette H. Fitzhugh, Kentucky
- Doorkeeper: James Page, North Carolina
- Assistant Doorkeeper: John Wadsworth, Georgia

=== House ===
- Clerk: Robert Emmett Dixon Sr., Georgia (died April 24, 1863)
  - Albert Reese Lamar, Georgia — sessions 3 and 4
- Assistant Clerk: James McDonald, Virginia
- Assistant Clerk: David Louis Dalton, Alabama — sessions 3 and 4
- Doorkeeper: Robert Harrison Wynne, Alabama

== Members ==
=== Senate ===
Confederate States senators were elected by the state legislatures, or appointed by state governors to fill casual vacancies until the legislature elected a new senator. It was intended that one-third of the Senate would commence fresh six-year terms with each subsequent Congress following the inaugural one.

Preceding the names in the list below are Senate class numbers, which indicate the cycle of their terms. In this Congress, all senators were newly elected. Senators of Class 1 served a two-year term, expiring at the end of this Congress, requiring a new election for the six-year term,1864–1870. Class 2 senators served what was intended to be a four-year term, due to end on the expiry of the next Congress in 1866. Class 3 senators were meant to serve a six-year term, due to expire at the end of the Third Confederate Congress in 1868. As the Confederate Congress lasted less than four full years, the distinction between classes 2 and 3 was ultimately academic.

The members of the classes were selected by drawing of lots, which was done during the meeting of the Senate on February 21, 1862.

The class is indicated before the name.

Alabama

- 1. Clement Claiborne Clay
- 3. William Lowndes Yancey (died on July 23, 1863)
  - Robert Jemison Jr. (took his seat on December 28, 1863 - Elected to fill vacancy)

Arkansas

- 1. Robert Ward Johnson
- 3. Charles Burton Mitchel

Florida

- 1. James McNair Baker
- 2. Augustus Emmet Maxwell

Georgia

- 3. Benjamin Harvey Hill
- 1. Robert Augustus Toombs (elected but refused to serve)
  - John Wood Lewis Sr. (took his seat on April 7, 1862 - Appointed to serve until the place could be filled)
  - Herschel Vespasian Johnson (took his seat on January 19, 1863 - Elected to fill vacancy)

Kentucky

- 3. Henry Cornelius Burnett
- 1. William Emmet Simms

Louisiana

- 2. Thomas Jenkins Semmes
- 3. Edward Sparrow

Mississippi

- 2. Albert Gallatin Brown
- 1. James Phelan Sr.

Missouri

- 1. John Bullock Clark Sr.
- 2. Robert Ludwell Yates Peyton (died on September 3, 1863)
  - Waldo Porter Johnson (took his seat on December 24, 1863 - Appointed to fill vacancy)

North Carolina

- 1. George Davis (resigned in January 1864 to become CS Attorney General)
  - Edwin Godwin Reade (took his seat on January 22, 1864 - Appointed to fill vacancy)
- 2. William Theophilus Dortch

South Carolina

- 2. Robert Woodward Barnwell
- 3. James Lawrence Orr

Tennessee

- 3. Landon Carter Haynes
- 2. Gustavus Adolphus Henry Sr.

Texas

- 3. William Simpson Oldham Sr.
- 2. Louis Trezevant Wigfall

Virginia

- 3. R. M. T. Hunter
- 2. William Ballard Preston (died November 16, 1862)
  - Allen Taylor Caperton (took his seat on January 22, 1864 - Elected to fill vacancy)

=== House of Representatives ===
X: Originally member of the Provisional Confederate Congress

The names of representatives are preceded by their district numbers.

==== Alabama ====
- 1. Thomas Jefferson Foster
- 2. William Russell Smith
- 3. John Perkins Ralls
- 4. Jabez Lamar Monroe Curry X
- 5. Francis Strother Lyon
- 6. William Parish Chilton Sr. X
- 7. David Clopton
- 8. James Lawrence Pugh
- 9. Edmund Strother Dargan

==== Arkansas ====
- 1. Felix Ives Batson
- 2. Grandison Delaney Royston
- 3. Augustus Hill Garland X
- 4. Thomas Burton Hanly

==== Florida ====
- 1. James Baird Dawkins (resigned on December 8, 1862)
  - John Marshall Martin (took his seat on March 25, 1863 - Elected to fill vacancy on February 2, 1863)
- 2. Robert Benjamin Hilton

==== Georgia ====
- 1. Julian Hartridge
- 2. Charles James Munnerlyn
- 3. Hines Holt (resigned on March 1, 1863 after third session)
  - Porter Ingram (took his seat on January 12, 1864 - Elected to fill vacancy on December 7, 1863)
- 4. Augustus Holmes Kenan X
- 5. David William Lewis
- 6. William White Clark
- 7. Robert Pleasant Trippe
- 8. Lucius Jeremiah Gartrell
- 9. Hardy Strickland
- 10. Augustus Romaldus Wright X

==== Kentucky ====
- 1. Willis Benson Machen
- 2. John Watkins Crockett Jr.
- 3. Henry English Read
- 4. George Washington Ewing X
- 5. James Chrisman
- 6. Theodore Legrand BurnettX
- 7. Horatio Washington Bruce
- 8. George Baird Hodge X
- 9. Eli Metcalfe Bruce
- 10. James William Moore
- 11. Robert Jefferson Breckinridge Jr.
- 12. John Milton Elliott X

==== Louisiana ====
- 1. Charles Jacques Villeré
- 2. Charles Magill Conrad X
- 3. Duncan Farrar Kenner X
- 4. Lucius Jacques Dupré
- 5. Henry Marshall X
- 6. John Perkins Jr. X

==== Mississippi ====
- 1. Jeremiah Watkins Clapp
- 2. Reuben Davis (resigned on March 1, 1863 after third session)
  - William Dunbar Holder (took his seat on January 21, 1864 - Elected to fill vacancy)
- 3. Israel Victor Welch
- 4. Henry Cousins Chambers
- 5. Otho Robards Singleton
- 6. Ethelbert Barksdale
- 7. John Jones McRae

==== Missouri ====
According to the Confederate law, the people of Missouri were entitled to elect thirteen representatives. The state never implemented the re-apportionment, and continued to use its existing seven districts. Pending an election, the appointed members of the delegation to the Provisional Congress were assigned to serve in the First Congress. Since No election was held, the appointed members served throughout the Congress.

- 1. William Mordecai Cooke Sr. X (died on September 3, 1863)
- 2. Thomas Alexander Harris X
- 3. Caspar Wistar Bell X
- 4. Aaron H. Conrow X
- 5. George Graham Vest X
- 6. Thomas W. Freeman X
- 7. Representative-elect John Hyer never took his seat; the district was unrepresented for the entire First Congress

==== North Carolina ====
- 1. William N. H. Smith
- 2. Robert Rufus Bridgers
- 3. Owen Rand Kenan
- 4. Thomas David Smith McDowell X
- 5. Archibald Hunter Arrington
- 6. James Robert McLean
- 7. Thomas Samuel Ashe
- 8. William Lander
- 9. Burgess Sidney Gaither
- 10. Allen Turner Davidson X

==== South Carolina ====
- 1. John McQueen
- 2. William Porcher Miles X
- 3. Lewis Malone Ayer Jr.
- 4. Milledge Luke Bonham (resigned on October 13, 1862 after the second session)
  - William Dunlap Simpson (took his seat on February 5, 1863 - Elected to fill vacancy on January 20, 1863)
- 5. James Farrow
- 6. William Waters Boyce X

==== Tennessee ====
- 1. Joseph Brown Heiskell (resigned on February 6, 1864)
- 2. William Graham Swan
- 3. William Henry Tibbs
- 4. Erasmus Lee Gardenhire
- 5. Henry Stuart Foote
- 6. Meredith Poindexter Gentry
- 7. George Washington Jones
- 8. Thomas Menees
- 9. John DeWitt Clinton Atkins X
- 10. John Vines Wright
- 11. David Maney Currin X

==== Texas ====
- 1. John Allen Wilcox (died on February 7, 1864)
- 2. Caleb Claiborne Herbert
- 3. Peter W. Gray
- 4. Franklin Barlow Sexton
- 5. Malcolm D. Graham
- 6. William Bacon Wright

==== Virginia ====
- 1. Muscoe Russell Hunter Garnett (died on February 14, 1864)
- 2. John Randolph Chambliss Sr.
- 3. James Lyons (Representative-elect John Tyler died on January 18, 1862, before the Congress started. Lyons was elected on February 10, 1862.)
- 4. Roger Atkinson Pryor X (resigned on April 5, 1862)
  - Charles Fenton Collier (took his seat on August 18, 1862 - Elected to fill vacancy in May 1862)
- 5. Thomas Stanley Bocock X
- 6. John Goode Jr.
- 7. James Philemon Holcombe
- 8. Daniel Coleman DeJarnette Sr.
- 9. William "Extra Billy" Smith (resigned on April 4, 1863)
  - David Funsten (took his seat on December 7, 1863 - Elected to fill vacancy)
- 10. Alexander Boteler X
- 11. John Brown Baldwin
- 12. Waller Redd Staples X
- 13. Walter Preston X
- 14. Albert Gallatin Jenkins (resigned on April 21, 1862 after first session)
  - Samuel Augustine Miller (took his seat on February 24, 1863 - Elected to fill vacancy)
- 15. Robert Johnston X
- 16. Charles Wells Russell X

=== Delegates ===
Non voting members of the House of Representatives.

Arizona Territory

- Marcus H. MacWillie

Cherokee Nation

- Elias Cornelius Boudinot X

Choctaw Nation

- Robert McDonald Jones

== Senate committees ==
Accounts

- Charles Burton Mitchel, Arkansas, Chairman
- William Theophilus Dortch, North Carolina
- William Emmett Simms, Kentucky
  - Allen Taylor Caperton, Virginia — temporary, session 3
  - Robert Ward Johnson, Arkansas —temporary, session 3

Claims

- George Davis, North Carolina, Chairman (resigned on January 11, 1864)
- Henry Cornelius Burnett, Kentucky
- Robert Ludwell Yates Peyton, Missouri (died on September 3, 1863)
- Waldo Porter Johnson, Missouri — session 4
- James McNair Baker, Florida — session 4
  - Robert Jemison Jr., Alabama — temporary, session 4

Commerce

- Clement Claiborne Clay, Alabama, Chairman
- Augustus Emmett Maxwell, Florida
- William Theophilus Dortch, North Carolina
- Robert Ludwell Yates Peyton, Missouri (died on September 3, 1863)
- Henry Cornelius Burnett, Kentucky — sessions 1 and 2
- James McNair Baker, Florida — session 3
- William Simpson Oldham Sr., Texas — sessions 3 and 4
- James Lawrence Orr, South Carolina — session 4

Engrossment and Enrollment

- Landon Carter Haynes Sr., Tennessee, Chairman — session 1 (appointed, but substituted by James Phelan)
- James Phelan, Mississippi, Chairman — sessions 1 and 2
- William Theophilus Dortch, North Carolina, Chairman — sessions 3 and 4
- Augustus Emmett Maxwell, Florida
- Charles Burton Mitchel, Arkansas — sessions 1 and 2
- Robert Ludwell Yates Peyton, Missouri — session 2
- James McNair Baker, Florida — session 2
- Allen Taylor Caperton, Virginia — sessions 3 and 4

Finance

- Robert Woodward Barnwell, South Carolina, Chairman
- Thomas Jenkins Semmes, Louisiana
- Robert Mercer Taliaferro Hunter, Virginia
- George Davis, North Carolina (resigned on January 11, 1864)
- Gustavus Adolphus Henry Sr., Tennessee — sessions 1 and 2
- John Wood Lewis Sr., Georgia — session 2
- Herschel Vespasian Johnson, Georgia — sessions 3 and 4
- Edwin Godwin Reade, North Carolina — session 4
  - Robert Jemison Jr., Alabama — temporary, session 4

Foreign Affairs

- James Lawrence Orr, South Carolina, Chairman
- John Bullock Clark Sr., Missouri
- Louis Trezevant Wigfall, Texas
- William Lowndes Yancey, Alabama (died on July 26, 1863)
- William Ballard Preston, Virginia (died on November 16, 1862)
- Robert M. T. Hunter, Virginia — session 3
- Augustus Emmet Maxwell, Florida — sessions 3 and 4
- Herschel Vespasian Johnson, Georgia — session 4

Indian Affairs

- Robert Ward Johnson, Arkansas, Chairman
- William Emmett Simms, Kentucky
- William Simpson Oldham Sr., Texas
- Clement Claiborne Clay, Alabama — sessions 1 and 2
- Robert Ludwell Yates Peyton, Missouri — sessions 1 and 2
- John Bullock Clark Sr., Missouri — sessions 3 and 4
- James Phelan, Mississippi — sessions 3 and 4

Judiciary

- Benjamin Harvey Hill, Georgia, Chairman
- Thomas Jenkins Semmes, Louisiana
- Landon Carter Haynes Sr., Tennessee
- James Phelan, Mississippi
- Henry Cornelius Burnett, Kentucky — sessions 1 and 2
- Allen Taylor Caperton, Virginia — sessions 3 and 4

Military Affairs

- Edward Sparrow, Louisiana, Chairman
- Gustavus Adolphus Henry Sr., Tennessee
- Louis Trezevant Wigfall, Texas
- Robert Ward Johnson, Arkansas — sessions 1 and 2
- William Ballard Preston, Virginia — sessions 1 and 2
- Clement Claiborne Clay, Alabama — sessions 3 and 4
- Henry Cornelius Burnett, Kentucky — sessions 3 and 4

Naval Affairs

- Albert Gallatin Brown, Mississippi, Chairman
- William Theophilus Dortch, North Carolina
- William Emmett Simms, Kentucky
- James McNair Baker, Florida
  - Henry Cornelius Burnett, Kentucky — temporary, session 1
  - Benjamin Harvey Hill, Georgia — temporary, session 1
  - George Davis, North Carolina — temporary, sessions 1 and 2
- William Simpson Oldham Sr., Texas —sessions 1 and 2
- Robert Ward Johnson, Arkansas — session 2
- Augustus Emmett Maxwell, Florida — session 3
- William Lowndes Yancey, Alabama (died on July 26, 1863) — session 3
- Herschel Vespasian Johnson, Georgia — sessions 3 and 4
- Robert Jemison Jr., Alabama — session 4

Patents

- Augustus Emmett Maxwell, Florida, Chairman
- Benjamin Harvey Hill, Georgia
- Landon Carter Haynes Sr., Tennessee

Pay and Mileage (Session 1)

- Henry Cornelius Burnett, Kentucky, Chairman
- Gustavus Adolphus Henry Sr., Tennessee
- James Lawrence Orr, South Carolina

Post Offices and Post Roads

- William Simpson Oldham Sr., Texas, Chairman
- Landon Carter Haynes Sr., Tennessee
- Charles Burton Mitchel, Arkansas
- James McNair Baker, Florida
- John Bullock Clark Sr., Missouri — sessions 1, 2, and 4
- James Phelan, Mississippi — session 1 (appointed but substituted by Landon Carter Haynes)
- William Emmett Simms, Kentucky —session 1 (appointed but declined)
- John Wood Lewis Sr., Georgia — session 2
- Robert Ludwell Yates Peyton, Missouri (died on September 3, 1863) — session 3
  - Herschel Vespasian Johnson, Georgia — temporary, session 3

Printing

- James Phelan, Mississippi, Chairman
- Benjamin Harvey Hill, Georgia
- John Bullock Clark Sr., Missouri — sessions 1, 2, and 4
- Landon Carter Haynes Sr., Tennessee — sessions 3 and 4

Public Lands

- John Bullock Clark Sr., Missouri, Chairman
- James McNair Baker, Florida
- William Lowndes Yancey, Alabama (died on July 26, 1863) — sessions 1, 2, and 3

Rules (Session 1)

- James Lawrence Orr, South Carolina, Chairman
- Clement Claiborne Clay, Alabama
- Robert Ward Johnson, Arkansas

Territories

- Louis Trezevant Wigfall, Texas, Chairman
- Albert Gallatin Brown, Mississippi
- William Lowndes Yancey, Alabama — sessions 1 and 2
- John Bullock Clark Sr., Missouri — sessions 3 and 4

== House committees ==
Accounts

- John McQueen, 1st South Carolina, Chairman
- Owen Rand Kenan, 3rd North Carolina
- Thomas Burton Hanly, 4th Arkansas
- Thomas Jefferson Foster, 1st Alabama
- Hardy Strickland, 9th Georgia
- Willis Benson Machen, 1st Kentucky — session 3

Claims

- William "Extra Billy" Smith, 9th Virginia, Chairman (resigned on April 4, 1863) — sessions 1 and 3
- David Clopton, 7th Alabama
- Jeremiah Watkins Clapp, 1st Mississippi
- James Robert McLean, 6th North Carolina
- Charles James Munnerlyn, 2nd Georgia
- James Farrow, 5th South Carolina
- Theodore Legrand Burnett, 6th Kentucky
- Erasmus Lee Gardenhire, 4th Tennessee
- Charles Jacques Villeré, 1st Louisiana — sessions 1, 2, and 3
- Henry Marshall, 5th Louisiana (appointed but declined) — session 3
- William Dunlap Simpson, 4th South Carolina — sessions 3 and 4
- Thomas Burton Hanly, 4th Arkansas — session 4
- William Bacon Wright, 6th Texas — session 4

Commerce

- Jabez Lamar Monroe Curry, 4th Alabama, Chairman
- Henry Cousins Chambers, 4th Mississippi
- Robert Pleasant Trippe, 7th Georgia
- Horatio Washington Bruce, 7th Kentucky
- Thomas David Smith McDowell, 4th North Carolina
- Charles Jacques Villeré, 1st Louisiana
- Franklin Barlow Sexton, 4th Texas
- James Lyons, 3rd Virginia
- William Mordecai Cooke Sr., 1st Missouri (died on September 3, 1863) — sessions 1, 2, and 3
- Charles Fenton Collier, 4th Virginia — session 2
- Julian Hartridge, 1st Georgia — session 2

Currency (Session 4)

- William Waters Boyce, 6th South Carolina, Chairman
- Francis Strother Lyon, 5th Alabama
- James Lawrence Pugh, 8th Alabama
- Charles Magill Conrad, 2nd Louisiana
- Robert Rufus Bridgers, 2nd North Carolina
- George Washington Jones, 7th Tennessee
- Peter W. Gray, 3rd Texas
- John Brown Baldwin, 11th Virginia
- Robert Johnston, 15th Virginia

Elections

- William N. H. Smith, 1st North Carolina, Chairman
- Jabez Lamar Monroe Curry, 4th Alabama
- Jeremiah Watkins Clapp, 1st Mississippi
- George Graham Vest, 5th Missouri
- Robert Pleasant Trippe, 7th Georgia
- John Watkins Crockett Jr., 2nd Kentucky
- Erasmus Lee Gardenhire, 4th Tennessee
- James Baird Dawkins, 1st Florida (resigned on December 8, 1862) — sessions 1 and 2
- Waller Redd Staples, 12th Virginia — sessions 1, 3, and 4

Enrolled Bills

- John Milton Elliott, 12th Kentucky, Chairman
- Henry Cousins Chambers, 4th Mississippi
  - John Goode Jr., 6th Virginia — temporary, session 1
  - Erasmus Lee Gardenhire, 4th Tennessee — temporary, sessions 1, 2, and 4
- William Henry Tibbs, 3rd Tennessee — sessions 1, 2, and 3
- Augustus Hill Garland, 3rd Arkansas — session 3
- John Allen Wilcox, 1st Texas — session 3
  - Horatio Washington Bruce, 7th Kentucky — temporary, sessions 3 and 4
- Thomas W. Freeman, 6th Missouri — session 4
- Thomas Burton Hanly, 4th Arkansas — session 4
- William Bacon Wright, 6th Texas — session 4

Foreign Affairs

- Henry Stuart Foote, 5th Tennessee, Chairman
- William Russell Smith, 2nd Alabama
- Robert Jefferson Breckinridge Jr., 11th Kentucky
- John Perkins Jr., 6th Louisiana
- Ethelbert Barksdale, 6th Mississippi
- James Robert McLean, 6th North Carolina
- John McQueen, 1st South Carolina
- Daniel Coleman DeJarnette Sr., 8th Virginia
- Walter Preston, 13th Virginia

Indian Affairs

- Otho Robards Singleton, 5th Mississippi, Chairman
- John Perkins Ralls, 3rd Alabama
- Thomas Burton Hanly, 4th Arkansas
- John Milton Elliott, 12th Kentucky
- Lucius Jacques Dupré, 4th Louisiana
- Archibald Hunter Arrington, 5th North Carolina
- William Henry Tibbs, 3rd Tennessee
- William Bacon Wright, 6th Texas
- John Goode Jr., 6th Virginia
- Elias Cornelius Boudinot, Cherokee Nation — session 4

Judiciary

- Lucius Jeremiah Gartrell, 8th Georgia, Chairman
- Edmund Strother Dargan, 9th Alabama
- Augustus Hill Garland, 3rd Arkansas
- James William Moore, 10th Kentucky
- Thomas Samuel Ashe, 7th North Carolina
- Joseph Brown Heiskell, 1st Tennessee (resigned on February 6, 1864)
- James Philemon Holcombe, 7th Virginia
- Charles Wells Russell, 16th Virginia

Medical Department (Sessions 2 - 4)

- Augustus Romaldus Wright, 10th Georgia, Chairman
- John Perkins Ralls, 3rd Alabama
- Grandison Delaney Royston, 2nd Arkansas — sessions 2 and 3
  - Augustus Hill Garland, 3rd Arkansas — temporary, session 4
  - Porter Ingram, 3rd Georgia — temporary, session 4
- James Chrisman, 5th Kentucky
- Caspar Wistar Bell, 3rd Missouri
- William N. H. Smith, 1st North Carolina
- James Farrow, 5th South Carolina
- Thomas Menees, 8th Tennessee
- John Goode Jr., 6th Virginia

Military Affairs

- William Porcher Miles, 2nd South Carolina, Chairman
- James Lawrence Pugh, 8th Alabama
- Robert Benjamin Hilton, 2nd Florida
- Augustus Holmes Kenan, 4th Georgia
- Eli Metcalfe Bruce, 9th Kentucky
- Charles Jacques Villeré, 1st Louisiana
- Henry Cousins Chambers, 4th Mississippi
- Thomas Alexander Harris, 2nd Missouri
- Robert Rufus Bridgers, 2nd North Carolina
- William Graham Swan, 2nd Tennessee
- John Allen Wilcox, 1st Texas (died on February 7, 1864)
- Reuben Davis, 2nd Mississippi — session 1
- Roger Atkinson Pryor, 4th Virginia (resigned on April 5, 1862) — session 1
  - Caspar Wistar Bell, 3rd Missouri — temporary, session 1
- Felix Ives Batson, 1st Arkansas — sessions 1, 2, and 3

Naval Affairs

- Charles Magill Conrad, 2nd Louisiana, Chairman
- David Clopton, 7th Alabama
- Augustus Romaldus Wright, 10th Georgia
- Burgess Sidney Gaither, 9th North Carolina
- William Waters Boyce, 6th South Carolina
- David Maney Currin, 11th Tennessee
- John Randolph Chambliss Sr., 2nd Virginia
- Charles Wells Russell, 16th Virginia — session 1
- James Baird Dawkins, 1st Florida (resigned on December 8, 1862) — sessions 1 and 2
- William "Extra Billy" Smith, 9th Virginia, (resigned on April 4, 1863) — sessions 1 and 3
- George Baird Hodge, 8th Kentucky — sessions 2 and 3
- John Marshall Martin, 1st Florida — sessions 3 and 4
- Charles Fenton Collier, 4th Virginia — session 4
- Thomas W. Freeman, 6th Missouri
- Charles James Munnerlyn, 2nd Georgia — temporary, session 4

Ordnance and Ordnance Stores (Sessions 2 - 4)

- Alexander Boteler, 10th Virginia, Chairman
- David Clopton, 7th Alabama
- Julian Hartridge, 1st Georgia
- Charles Magill Conrad, 2nd Louisiana
- Jeremiah Watkins Clapp, 1st Mississippi
- John Vines Wright, 10th Tennessee
- Caleb Claiborne Herbert, 2nd Texas — sessions 2 and 3
- George Baird Hodge, 8th Kentucky — sessions 2 and 3
- William Mordecai Cooke Sr., 1st Missouri (died on September 3, 1863) — sessions 2 and 3
- Lewis Malone Ayer Jr., 3rd South Carolina — session 4

Patents

- Caspar Wistar Bell, 3rd Missouri, Chairman
- William Parish Chilton Sr., 6th Alabama
- Robert Benjamin Hilton, 2nd Florida
- Hardy Strickland, 9th Georgia
- Henry English Read, 3rd Kentucky
- Henry Marshall, 5th Louisiana
- William Lander, 8th North Carolina
- William Bacon Wright, 6th Texas
- Waller Redd Staples, 12th Virginia — sessions 1, 3, and 4

Pay and Mileage (Sessions 1 - 2)

- Theodore Legrand Burnett, 6th Kentucky, Chairman
- Augustus Romaldus Wright, 10th Georgia
- Otho Robards Singleton, 5th Mississippi
- Robert Rufus Bridgers, 2nd North Carolina (appointed but replaced by Augustus Romaldus Wright due to extended absence) — session 1
- Israel Victor Welch, 3rd Mississippi — session 2

Post Offices and Post Roads

- William Parish Chilton Sr., 6th Alabama, Chairman
- Robert Benjamin Hilton, 2nd Florida
- William White Clark, 6th Georgia
- Aaron H. Conrow, 4th Missouri
- Allen Turner Davidson, 10th North Carolina
- John DeWitt Clinton Atkins, 9th Tennessee
- Robert Johnston, 15th Virginia
- Israel Victor Welch, 3rd Mississippi — sessions 1 and 2
- Grandison Delaney Royston, 2nd Arkansas — sessions 1, 2, and 3
- Caleb Claiborne Herbert, 2nd Texas — sessions 1, 2, and 3
- Thomas Burton Hanly, 4th Arkansas — session 4

Printing

- Ethelbert Barksdale, 6th Mississippi, Chairman
- Augustus Romaldus Wright, 10th Georgia
- Lucius Jacques Dupré, 4th Louisiana
- Thomas Menees, 8th Tennessee
- Albert Gallatin Jenkins, 14th Virginia (resigned April 21, 1862) — session 1
- David Funsten, 9th Virginia — session 4
  - David William Lewis, 5th Georgia — temporary, session 4
  - William Russell Smith, 2nd Alabama — temporary, session 4

Public Buildings

- James Lyons, 3rd Virginia, Chairman
- James Lawrence Pugh, 8th Alabama
- David Maney Currin, 11th Tennessee

Quartermaster's and Commissary Departments and Military Transportation (Sessions 2 - 4)

- William Parish Chilton Sr., 6th Alabama, Chairman
- William White Clark, 6th Georgia
- John Jones McRae, 7th Mississippi
- William Lander, 8th North Carolina
- Lewis Malone Ayer Jr., 3rd South Carolina
- Franklin Barlow Sexton, 4th Texas
- Walter Preston, 13th Virginia
- James Baird Dawkins, 1st Florida (resigned on December 8, 1862) — session 2
- Henry Marshall, 5th Louisiana — sessions 2 and 3
- Grandison Delaney Royston, 2nd Arkansas — session 3
- Allen Turner Davidson, 10th North Carolina — temporary, session 3; permanent, session 4
  - Israel Victor Welch, 3rd Mississippi — temporary, session 4
- Henry Stuart Foote, 5th Tennessee — session 4
- Robert Pleasant Trippe, 7th Georgia — session 4
- Thomas Burton Hanly, 4th Arkansas — session 4

Rules and Officers of the House (Sessions 1 - 3)

- George Washington Jones, 7th Tennessee, Chairman
- David William Lewis, 5th Georgia
- John Perkins Jr., 6th Louisiana
- William N. H. Smith, 1st North Carolina
- Alexander Boteler, 10th Virginia

Territories and Public Lands

- John Allen Wilcox, 1st Texas, Chairman (died February 7, 1864)
- Thomas Jefferson Foster, 1st Alabama
- David William Lewis, 5th Georgia
- George Washington Ewing, 4th Kentucky
- Henry Marshall, 5th Louisiana
- Thomas W. Freeman, 6th Missouri
- Thomas Menees, 8th Tennessee
- Albert Gallatin Jenkins, 14th Virginia (resigned on April 21, 1862) —session 1
- Felix Ives Batson, 1st Arkansas — sessions 1, 2, and 3
- Samuel Augustine Miller, 14th Virginia — session 4

War Tax (Session 2)

- Lewis Malone Ayer Jr., 3rd South Carolina, Chairman
- Francis Strother Lyon, 5th Alabama
- Thomas Burton Hanly, 4th Arkansas
- Robert Benjamin Hilton, 2nd Florida
- William White Clark, 6th Georgia
- James Chrisman, 5th Kentucky
- Israel Victor Welch, 3rd Mississippi
- Aaron H. Conrow, 4th Missouri
- William Lander, 8th North Carolina
- Joseph Brown Heiskell, 1st Tennessee
- Franklin Barlow Sexton, 4th Texas
- Charles Fenton Collier, 4th Virginia

Ways and Means

- Duncan Farrar Kenner, 3rd Louisiana, Chairman — sessions 1, 2, and 3
- Francis Strother Lyon, 5th Alabama
- Willis Benson Machen, 1st Kentucky
- John Jones McRae, 7th Mississippi
- George Washington Jones, 7th Tennessee
- Malcolm D. Graham, 5th Texas
- John Brown Baldwin, 11th Virginia
- Muscoe Russell Hunter Garnett, 1st Virginia — session 1
- Milledge Luke Bonham, 4th South Carolina (resigned on October 13, 1862) — session 1 and 2
- Hines Holt, 3rd Georgia (resigned March 1, 1863) — sessions 1, 2, and 3
- William Waters Boyce, 6th South Carolina — sessions 3 and 4
- Julian Hartridge, 1st Georgia — session 4
- John Perkins Jr., 6th Louisiana — session 4

== Joint committees ==
Buildings (Session 1)

- Senators
  - Henry Cornelius Burnett, Kentucky, Chairman
  - James McNair Baker, Florida
  - George Davis, North Carolina
- Representatives
  - James Lyons, 3rd Virginia, Chairman
  - James Lawrence Pugh, 8th Alabama
  - David Maney Currin, 11th Tennessee

Engrossment and Enrollment (Session 1)

- Senators
  - James Phelan Sr., Mississippi, Chairman
  - Charles Burton Mitchel, Arkansas
  - Augustus Emmet Maxwell, Florida
- Representatives
  - John Milton Elliott, 12th Kentucky, Chairman
  - Henry Cousins Chambers, 4th Mississippi
  - William Henry Tibbs, 3rd Tennessee
    - Erasmus Lee Gardenhire, 4th Tennessee — temporary

Flag and Seal (Sessions 1 - 3)

- Senators
  - Thomas Jenkins Semmes, Louisiana, Chairman
  - James Lawrence Orr, South Carolina
  - William Ballard Preston, Virginia (died on November 16, 1862) — sessions 1 and 2
  - Louis Trezevant Wigfall, Texas — session 3
- Representatives
  - Alexander Boteler, 10th Virginia, Chairman
  - William Russell Smith, 2nd Alabama
  - Peter W. Gray, 3rd Texas

Inauguration (Session 1)

- Senators
  - James Lawrence Orr, South Carolina, Chairman
  - Albert Gallatin Brown, Mississippi
  - Gustavus Adolphus Henry Sr., Tennessee
- Representatives
  - James Lyons, 3rd Virginia, Chairman
  - Francis Strother Lyon, 5th Alabama
  - Felix Ives Batson, 1st Arkansas
  - Robert Benjamin Hilton, 2nd Florida
  - Hines Holt, 3rd Georgia
  - Horatio Washington Bruce, 7th Kentucky
  - Henry Marshall, 5th Louisiana
  - Otho Robards Singleton, 5th Mississippi
  - William Mordecai Cooke Sr., 1st Missouri
  - Thomas David Smith McDowell, 4th North Carolina
  - John McQueen, 1st South Carolina
  - William Graham Swan, 2nd Tennessee
  - John Allen Wilcox, 1st Texas

Printing

- Senators
  - James Phelan Sr., Mississippi, Chairman
  - Benjamin Harvey Hill, Georgia
  - John Bullock Clark Sr., Missouri — sessions 1, 2, and 4
  - Landon Carter Haynes Sr., Tennessee — sessions 3 and 4
- Representatives
  - Ethelbert Barksdale, 6th Mississippi, Chairman
  - Augustus Romaldus Wright, 10th Georgia
  - Lucius Jacques Dupré, 4th Louisiana
  - Thomas Menees, 8th Tennessee
  - Albert Gallatin Jenkins, 14th Virginia (resigned April 21, 1862) — session 1
  - David Funsten, 9th Virginia — session 4
    - William Russell Smith, 2nd Alabama — temporary, session 4
    - David William Lewis, 5th Georgia — temporary, session 4

Rules (Session 1)

- Senators
  - James Lawrence Orr, South Carolina, Chairman
  - Clement Claiborne Clay, Alabama
  - Robert Ward Johnson, Arkansas
  - William Lowndes Yancey, Alabama
- Representatives
  - Thomas Stanley Bocock, 5th Virginia, Chairman
  - Jabez Lamar Monroe Curry, 4th Alabama
  - David William Lewis, 5th Georgia
  - John Perkins Jr., 6th Louisiana
  - George Washington Jones, 7th Tennessee
