= Gardenhire =

Gardenhire is a surname.

- Erasmus Lee Gardenhire (1815–1899), Civil War-era Tennessee politician
- George Gardenhire (1841–?), territorial Oklahoma politician
- Ron Gardenhire (born 1957), former Major League Baseball shortstop and manager
- Samuel Major Gardenhire (1855–1923), writer
- Toby Gardenhire (born 1982), American former baseball player
