= Senator Hanley =

Senator Hanley or Hanly may refer to:

- Dana Hanley (fl. 1980s–1990s), Maine State Senate
- Frank Hanly (1863–1920), Indiana State Senate
- Joe R. Hanley (1876–1961), New York State Senate
- Thomas Burton Hanly (1812–1880), Arkansas State Senate

== See also ==
- Senator Handley (disambiguation)
