= Villere =

Villere or Villeré is a surname. Notable people with the surname include:

- Charles Jacques Villeré (1828–1899), Confederate legislator from Louisiana
- Jacques Phillippe Villeré (1761–1830), Governor of Louisiana
