= Menees =

Menees is a surname. Notable people with the surname include:

- Eric Menees, American Anglican priest
- Thomas Menees (1823–1905), Confederate politician and academic
