= Mark Harden Blandford =

American judge

Associate Justice of the Supreme Court of Georgia
- In office 1883–1890
- Appointed by: Henry Dickerson McDaniel
- Preceded by: Martin J. Crawford
- Succeeded by: Samuel Lumpkin

Member of the Confederate House of Representatives from Georgia's 3rd district
- In office May 2, 1864 – March 18, 1865
- Preceded by: Porter Ingram
- Succeeded by: Constituency abolished

Personal details
- Born: Mark Harden Blandford; July 13, 1826 Warren County, Georgia, U.S.
- Died: January 31, 1902 (aged 75) Columbus, Georgia, U.S.
- Resting place: Linwood Cemetery

Mark Harden Blandford (July 13, 1826 – January 31, 1902) was an American soldier, attorney, politician, and judge. He was a Member of the Confederate House of Representatives during the American Civil War.

== Biography ==
Mark Blandford was born in Warren County, Georgia. He served in the United States Army during the Mexican–American War and in the Confederate States Army (12th Georgia Infantry Regiment) during the early part of the American Civil War. He represented Georgia in the Second Confederate Congress from 1864 to 1865.

After the war, he served as a justice of the Supreme Court of Georgia from 1883 to 1890. He died in Columbus, Georgia, January 31, 1902, and is buried in Linwood Cemetery, Columbus, Georgia.
