= Thomas McDowell (disambiguation) =

Thomas McDowell (born 1977) is a British man convicted of killing German trainee rabbi Andreas Hinz.

Thomas McDowell may also refer to:

- Thomas Clay McDowell, American businessman, racehorse owner, breeder, and trainer
- Thomas Bleakley McDowell, British Army officer and chief executive of The Irish Times
- Thomas David Smith McDowell, slave-owner and North Carolina politician

== See also ==
- Thomas MacDowell, Bishop of Galloway
