= Walter Preston =

Walter Preston may refer to:

- Sir Walter Preston (British politician) (1875–1946), Conservative Member of Parliament 1918–1923 and 1928–1937
- Walter Preston (American politician) representative from Virginia at the First Confederate Congress
- Walter W. Preston (1863–1951), American politician and judge from Maryland
- Walt Preston, American baseball player
