= Old City Cemetery (Columbus, Georgia) =

Historic cemetery in Muscogee County, Georgia, US

- U.S. National Register of Historic Places
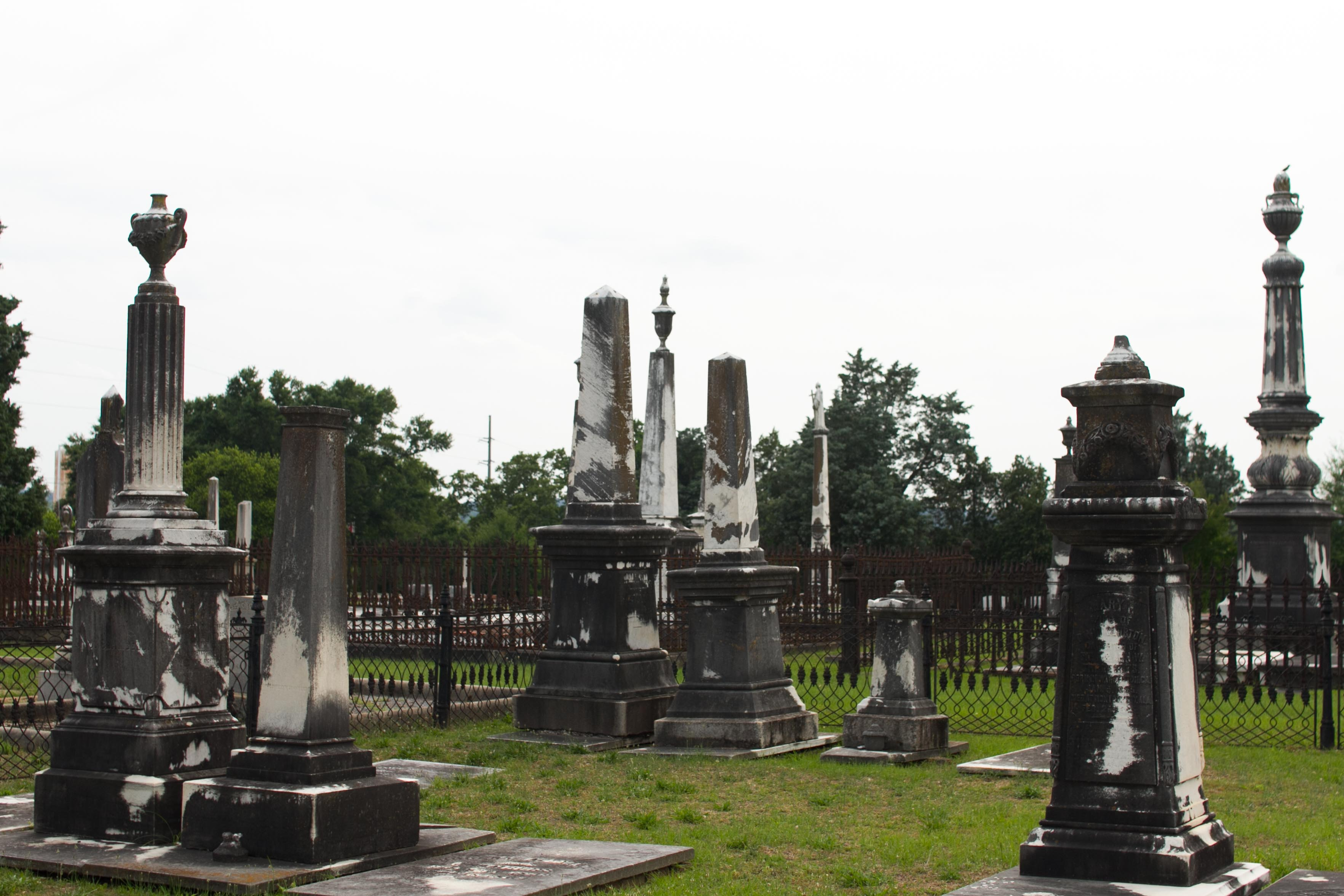
- Linwood Cemetery in May 2014

- Location within Georgia Location within the United States
- Location: 721 Linwood Boulevard, Columbus, Georgia
- Coordinates: 32°28′39″N 84°58′59″W
- Built: 1828; 198 years ago
- Architect: Edward Lloyd Thomas
- Architectural style: Gothic, Egyptian Revival
- Website: Official website
- MPS: Columbus MRA
- NRHP reference No.: 80001188
- Added to NRHP: September 29, 1980

The Old City Cemetery, also known as Linwood Cemetery, is a 28.7-acre (11.6 ha) cemetery on what is now Linwood Boulevard, in Columbus, Georgia. It dates from 1828, when the town of Columbus was founded, or before. It appears in surveyor Edward Lloyd Thomas's original plan for the city. The cemetery consists mostly of rectangular family plots bordered by iron fences or walls made of brick or granite, accessed by a main east–west corridor and perpendicular lanes. It includes both simple and elaborate tombstones, some displaying Egyptian Revival or Gothic styles.

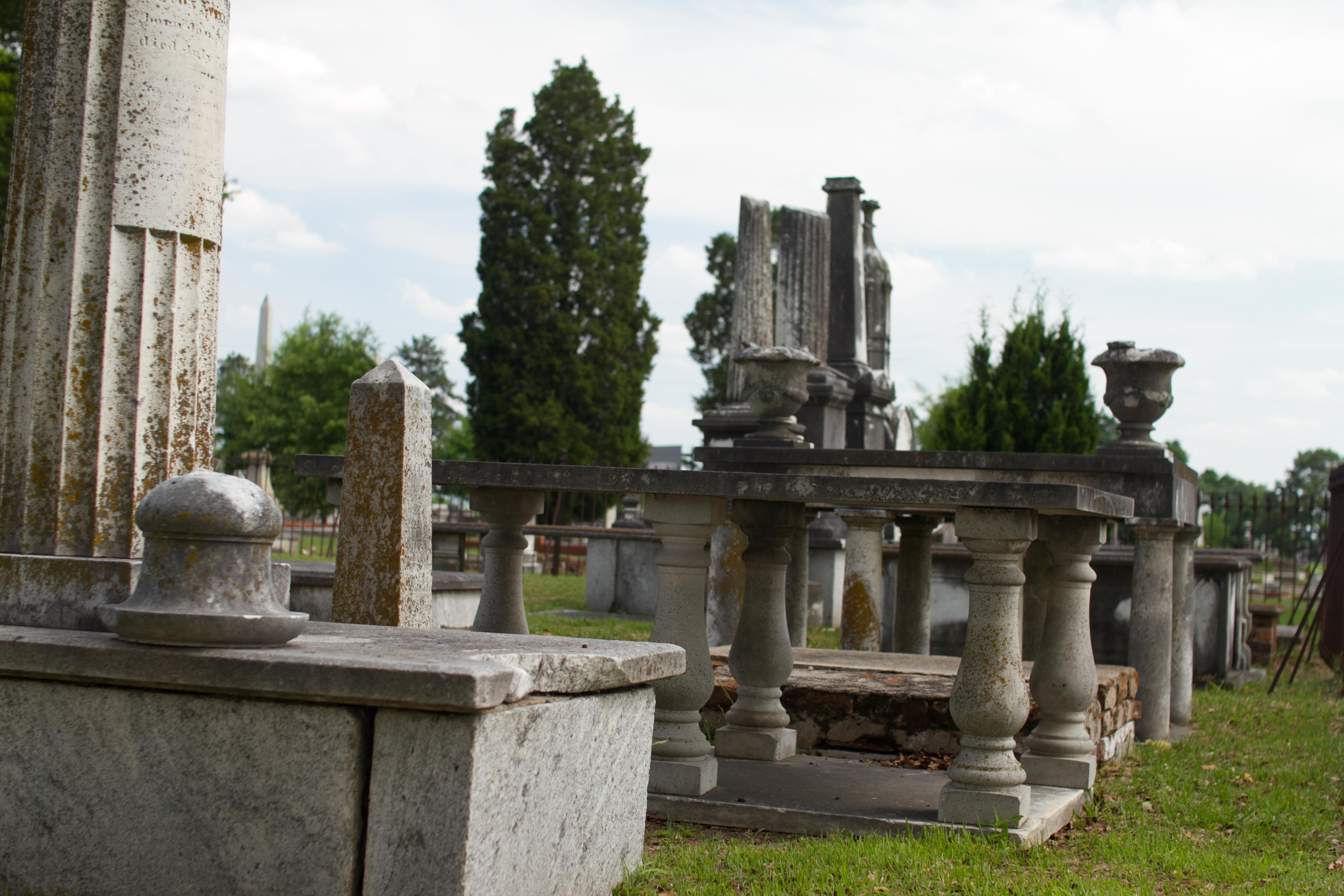
Altar tombs at the cemetery

The cemetery was given the name "Linwood" in 1894 by city council resolution, probably to honor Columbus author Caroline Lee Hentz whose works include Ernest Linwood, an 1856 book.

It was listed on the National Register of Historic Places in 1980.

According to its 1978 nomination, the majority of prominent Columbus persons are buried there. Its burials include more than 200 Confederate Army soldiers representing every state in the Confederacy.

Thomas's own son was an early burial, as he died and was buried in the cemetery in 1828 while Thomas was amidst his work surveying, but apparently the grounds include earlier marked and unmarked graves of "'early traders, river people, and Indians.'"

== Notable burials ==
- James Abercrombie (1792–1861), US Representative
- Henry L. Benning (1814–1875), American Civil War CSA general for whom nearby Fort Benning was once named (currently named after CPL Fred G. Benning)
- Mark Harden Blandford (1826–1902), CSA Congressman
- Absalom Harris Chappell (1801–1878), US Representative
- Peyton H. Colquitt (1831–1863), Civil War Confederate officer
- Walter T. Colquitt (1799–1855), US Senator
- Martin Jenkins Crawford (1820–1883), US Representative and CSA Congressman
- Noble Leslie DeVotie (1838–1861), founder of Sigma Alpha Epsilon fraternity
- Thomas Flournoy Foster (1796–1848), US Representative
- Hines Holt (1805–1865), US Representative
- Porter Ingram (1810–1893), CSA Congressman
- Alfred Iverson Sr. (1798–1873), US Representative and Senator
- James Johnson (1811–1891), Georgia Governor
- Seaborn Jones (1788–1864), US Representative
- Thomas M. Nelson (1782–1853), US Representative
- Dr. John Stith Pemberton (1831–1888), formulator of Coca-Cola
- Pleasant J. Philips (1819–1876), Civil War Confederate general
- Paul Jones Semmes (1815–1863), Civil War Confederate general
- Francis Orray Ticknor (1822–1874), doctor and poet
