= John Crockett =

John Crockett may refer to:

- John Crockett (director) (1918–1986), British stage and television director
- John McClannahan Crockett (1816–1887), mayor of Dallas, Texas and Lieutenant Governor
- John Watkins Crockett Jr. (1818–1874), Confederate politician from Kentucky
- John Wesley Crockett (1807–1852), U.S. Representative from Tennessee
- John Crockett (frontiersman) (1754–?), father of Davy Crockett
- John Crockett (gridiron football) (born 1992), American football running back
- John H. Crockett (1864–1925), American politician in Virginia
