= Senator Peyton =

Senator Peyton may refer to:

- Balie Peyton (1803–1878), Tennessee State Senate
- Joseph Hopkins Peyton (1808–1845), Tennessee State Senate
- Robert Ludwell Yates Peyton (1822–1863), Confederate States Senator from Missouri from 1862 to 1863
