= Henry Cousins Chambers =

Confederate-American politician (1823–1871)

Member of the Confederate House of Representatives for Mississippi
- In office February 18, 1862 – March 18, 1865

Personal details
- Born: July 26, 1823 Limestone County, Alabama
- Died: May 1, 1871 (aged 47) Bolivar County, Mississippi
- Resting place: Elmwood Cemetery, Memphis, Tennessee
- Education: College of New Jersey

Henry Cousins Chambers (July 26, 1823 – May 1, 1871) was a Confederate politician during the American Civil War.

He was born in Limestone County, Alabama, the son of Henry H. Chambers who had briefly served as a US senator from Alabama. The younger Chambers attended the College of New Jersey (later renamed to Princeton University), moved to Mississippi and served in the state legislature representing Coahoma County from 1859-1861. Following the secession of Mississippi from the Union in 1861, Chambers represented the state in the First Confederate Congress and the Second Confederate Congress from 1862 to 1865.

He killed his opponent for Confederate Congress, William Augustus Lake, in a duel in 1861. Chambers ran unopposed for reelection in 1863, and was a strong ally of Confederate President Jefferson Davis in the House, advocating for national control over military matters and conscription programs stronger than those that actually came into effect.

Chambers died on May 1, 1871 in Bolivar County, Mississippi and is buried at Elmwood Cemetery, Memphis, Tennessee.

== See also ==
- List of Confederate duels
