= Horatio Washington Bruce =

American politician

Horatio W. Bruce
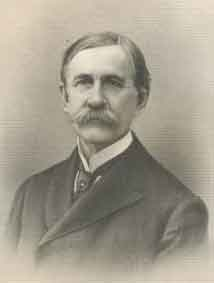

Confederate Congressman from Kentucky
- In office February 18, 1862 – March 18, 1865
- Preceded by: New office
- Succeeded by: End of office

Member of the Kentucky House of Representatives from Fleming County
- In office August 6, 1855 – August 3, 1857 Serving with Alfred F. Graham
- Preceded by: Elisha S. Fitch; Harvey T. Wilson
- Succeeded by: Henry B. Dobyns; George S. Fleming

Personal details
- Born: February 22, 1830 Lewis County, Kentucky, U.S.
- Died: January 22, 1903 (aged 72) Louisville, Kentucky, U.S.
- Party: Whig; Know Nothing
- Spouse: Elizabeth Hardin Helm
- Relations: Son-in-law of John L. Helm
- Profession: Lawyer

Horatio Washington Bruce (February 22, 1830 – January 22, 1903) was a Confederate politician during the American Civil War.

== Early life ==
Horatio Bruce was born February 22, 1830, about one mile south of Vanceburg in Lewis County, Kentucky. He was the son of Alexander and Amanda (Bragg) Bruce and named for two of his uncles, Horatio and Washington Bruce. His paternal grandfather was a soldier in the Continental Army during the Revolutionary War, and his father was a wealthy landowner who served as a Whig in the Kentucky General Assembly in 1825 and 1826. His maternal grandfather also served in the Revolutionary War. He was of Scottish ancestry on his father's side and English ancestry on his mother's side.

Bruce was educated in private schools in his native Lewis County, as well as Manchester, Ohio. At age sixteen, he began work as a salesman in a general store, a job he held until 1849. Concurrently, he was postmaster of the post office in Vanceburg. In 1849, Bruce taught at a school in Vanceburg for a five-month term. The following year, he taught for five months in another school in Lewis County. In December 1850, he relocated to Flemingsburg, where he read law in the office of Leander M. Cox. He was admitted to the bar in July 1851 and opened his practice in Flemingsburg. Later that year, he was appointed examiner by the circuit court of Fleming county, and soon after was elected to the Flemingsburg Board of School Trustees.

== Antebellum political career ==
Bruce first became active in politics in 1852, making campaign speeches for the Whig presidential ticket of Winfield Scott and William Alexander Graham in the 1852 election. When the Whig Party collapsed, Bruce associated with the Know Nothing Party, and was elected to represent Fleming County in the Kentucky House of Representatives in 1855 and 1856.

On June 12, 1856, Bruce married Elizabeth Hardin Helm, daughter of two-time Kentucky Governor John L. Helm, at "Helm Place", the bride's home in Elizabethtown, Kentucky. The couple had five children: Helm Bruce, Elizabeth Barber Bruce, Maria Preston Pope Bruce, Mary (Bruce) Smith, and V. Alexander Bruce. In August 1856, Bruce was elected Commonwealth's Attorney for the Tenth District, comprising Mason, Lewis, Greenup, Rowan, Fleming and Nicholas counties. He held this position until 1858.

In late 1858, he resigned his position as Commonwealth's Attorney and moved to Louisville. There, he formed the law firm of Helm and Bruce with his brother-in-law, Benjamin Hardin Helm. During the 1860 presidential election, Bruce actively supported the Constitutional Union ticket of John Bell and Edward Everett. In 1861, he adopted a states' rights platform and unsuccessfully sought a seat in the United States House of Representatives, losing to Robert Mallory.

== Civil War ==
At the outbreak of the Civil War, Bruce sided with the Confederacy and left Louisville for Bowling Green, the headquarters of the state's Confederates, on August 17, 1861. He was a delegate to Kentucky's first Confederate sovereignty convention, held at Russellville from October 29–31, 1861. This self-constituted convention laid the groundwork for Kentucky's secession from the Union, and called for a second convention to be held in Russellville November 18 and 19, 1861. This second convention passed an ordinance of secession, declaring Kentucky to have withdrawn from the Union. The convention also established a provisional Confederate state government, and Bruce was elected a member of its legislature. Shortly thereafter, Kentucky was admitted to the Confederate States of America.

On January 22, 1862, Bruce was elected as a Representative in the First Confederate Congress. He was chosen to represent Kentucky on a committee to arrange and conduct the inaugural ceremonies of Jefferson Davis and Alexander H. Stephens as Confederate President and Vice-President, respectively. He was also named to the Foreign Relations Committee and the Committee on Patents. On January 10, 1864, he was re-elected to the Second Confederate Congress, serving until the end of the war. Records of his service in the Confederate Congresses have been lost to history.

Bruce and the other members of the Confederate Congress – along with President Davis – remained in Richmond, Virginia, until April 2, 1865. They then fled to Danville, Virginia, where they remained until Robert E. Lee's surrender at Appomattox Court House. Afterward, Bruce traveled first to Greensboro, North Carolina, and Augusta, Georgia, before returning to Richmond after President Andrew Johnson declared amnesty for ex-Confederates. Bruce then traveled to Washington, D.C. where he arranged a meeting with his close friend and fellow Kentuckian, Attorney General James Speed. Speed informed Bruce that he had been granted a pardon for any actions of disloyalty during the war.

== Post-war life ==
Bruce returned to Louisville June 19, 1865, and in August 1865, formed the law firm of Bruce and Russell with Samuel Russell, his former pupil. They dissolved the partnership in 1868 when Bruce was elected to the circuit court in Kentucky's ninth district, comprising Jefferson, Oldham, Shelby, Spencer, and Bullitt counties. He was elected by the overwhelming majority of 10,611 votes in a contest where only 14,817 votes were cast. Bruce was among the first Kentuckians to call for courts to recognize negros' testimony as competent and valid, writing a letter to the Chicago Evening Post in support of this cause on February 20, 1869.

Beginning in 1872, despite never having attended college, he served as a law professor at the University of Louisville, holding the chair of history and science of law, law of real property, and contracts and criminal law. He also served as president of the Louisville Medical College. In 1873, Governor Preston Leslie appointed Bruce as a chancellor of the Louisville Chancery Court to fill a vacancy caused by the death of Chancellor Cochran. At a special election held in February 1874, he was elected to fill the remainder of the unexpired term. In August 1874, he was re-elected to a full, six-year term. He resigned from the chancery court on March 10, 1880, to accept the position of attorney for the Louisville and Nashville Railroad. Shortly after taking this position, he also resigned his professorship at the University of Louisville.

Bruce died on January 22, 1903, in Louisville. He is buried in Cave Hill Cemetery in Louisville, Kentucky.
