= Thomas Alexander Harris =

American politician (1826–1895)

Member of the Kentucky House of Representatives from Oldham and Trimble Counties
- In office August 3, 1885 – August 1, 1887
- Preceded by: W. F. Peak
- Succeeded by: W. O. Coleman

Member of the First Confederate Congress
- In office 1861–1864

Member of the Missouri House of Representatives
- In office 1860–1861

Personal details
- Born: 1826 Warren County, Virginia, U.S.
- Died: April 9, 1895 (aged 68–69) Pewee Valley, Kentucky, U.S.
- Resting place: Cave Hill Cemetery; Louisville, Kentucky, U.S.
- Military career
- Allegiance: United States of America; Confederate States of America
- Branch: United States Army; Missouri State Guard (Confederate)
- Service years: 1848 (USA); 1861
- Rank: Second Lieutenant (USA); Brigadier General (Missouri militia, CSA)
- Conflicts: American Civil War; First Battle of Lexington
- Other work: Life insurance sales Newspaperman; Assistant Secretary of State of Kentucky

Thomas Alexander Harris (1826 – April 9, 1895) was a United States Army officer at the end of the Mexican–American War and a Missouri State Guard (Confederate) brigadier general during the early months of the American Civil War (Civil War). He then became a prominent Confederate politician, serving in the First Confederate Congress from 1861 to 1864. Among other occupations, he was a Missouri State Representative before the Civil War and a Kentucky State Representative in 1885–1886.

== Early life ==
Thomas A. Harris was born in Warren County, Virginia, in 1826. His family moved to Missouri when Harris was a young boy. An orphan, he fought in the 1838 Mormon War at the age of 12. Harris attended the United States Military Academy in 1843–1845 but did not graduate.

== Career ==
Harris was commissioned a second lieutenant in the 12th U.S. Infantry Regiment in 1848 but peace was declared to end the Mexican–American War on the day he reported for duty. He participated in two filibustering expeditions in the early 1850s. He then returned to Hannibal, Missouri, where he became attorney for a railroad, city attorney and a newspaper editor. He was elected to the Missouri House of Representatives in 1860 and became chairman of the military committee.

As a brigadier general in the pro-Confederate Missouri State Guard, he fought at the First Battle of Lexington, Missouri. Between late 1861 and 1864, he represented Missouri in the First Confederate Congress. He then smuggled equipment for the Confederate States Army from Europe through the Union blockade of the Confederacy.

After the Civil War, Harris worked for the Life Insurance Association of America in St. Louis, Missouri, and opened an office in Texas in 1870. Then he worked for a New Orleans, Louisiana, newspaper. After this, he moved to Kentucky, where his friendship with the governor gained him an appointment as assistant secretary of state. Harris won a seat in the Kentucky House of Representatives from Oldham County in 1885–1886.

== Personal life ==
Thomas Alexander Harris died on April 9, 1895, in Pewee Valley, Kentucky, near Louisville. He is buried in Cave Hill Cemetery in Louisville.
