= William White Clark =

Confederate politician (1819–1883)

William White Clark (September 23, 1819 – August 6, 1883) was a Confederate politician. He was born in Richmond County, Georgia and served in the Georgia state legislature in 1841. He represented the state in the First Confederate Congress from 1862 to 1864.
