= Caspar Wistar Bell =

American political leader (1819–1898)

Caspar Wistar Bell (February 2, 1819 – October 27, 1898) was a prominent Confederate politician. He was born in Prince Edward County, Virginia, and later moved to Missouri. He represented the state in the Provisional Confederate Congress and the First Confederate Congress.

Caspar Wistar Bell was born February 2, 1819, in Prince Edward County, Virginia. His name suggests that they were friends or admirers of Caspar Wistar, a noted physician and natural scientist who had recently died.

He married Madeline Leontina Bell. They were the parents of at least six children.

Caspar Bell died October 27, 1898, at the age of 79, in Brunswick, Missouri. He is buried at Douglas Cemetery.
