= Robert Pleasant Trippe =

American judge

Robert Pleasant Trippe (December 21, 1819 – July 22, 1900) was an American politician, lawyer and jurist from the state of Georgia.

== Biography ==
Trippe was born near Monticello in Jasper County, Georgia, and later moved with his family to an area near Culloden, Georgia. He attended Randolph Macon College in Ashland, Virginia, before graduating from Franklin College at the University of Georgia in Athens in 1839. While at Franklin College, he was a member of the Phi Kappa Literary Society. He then studied law, was admitted to the state bar in 1840 and began the practice of law in Forsyth, Georgia.

In 1849, Trippe was elected to the Georgia House of Representatives and held that position until 1852 when he unsuccessfully ran for the United States House of Representatives. In 1854, he ran for the U.S. House again and was elected as an American Party candidate representing Georgia's 3rd congressional district in the 34th United States Congress. He was re-elected to the 35th Congress.

In 1858, Trippe did not seek re-election to the U.S. Congress. He was elected to the Georgia Senate that year and was re-elected in 1860. He was also elected to the First Confederate Congress. During the American Civil War, Trippe was in the Confederate States Army from 1862 to 1865. After the war, he returned to practicing law. In 1873, he became an associate justice of the Georgia Supreme Court and sat on that court until his resignation in 1875. He again returned to practicing of law in Atlanta, Georgia. On July 22, 1900, he died in Atlanta and was buried in Forsyth Cemetery in Forsyth.

U.S. House of Representatives
Preceded by David J. Bailey	Member of the U.S. House of Representatives from Georgia's 3rd congressional district March 4, 1855 – March 3, 1859	Succeeded by Thomas Hardeman, Jr.
