= John Perkins Ralls =

American politician

John Perkins Ralls, Sr. (January 1, 1822 – November 22, 1904) was a physician and representative from the state of Alabama to the Congress of the Confederate States during the American Civil War, not to be confused with John Rawls the 20th-century American philosopher.

Ralls was born in Greensboro, Georgia, on New Years Day, 1822. He attended medical school in Augusta, Georgia and Paris, France, and established a practice in Gadsden, Alabama. He married Agnes Mary Hamilton. They would eventually have eight children.

He represented Cherokee County, AL as a delegate to the Alabama secession convention in early 1861. He represented the state in the First Confederate Congress from 1862 to 1864. Following the war, he was a delegate to the Alabama state constitutional convention in 1875. He was elected to the Alabama State Legislature in 1878.

Ralls was actively involved in the Methodist Church and was a noted minister. One of his sons, Hamilton, was also a minister. He died in Gadsden, Alabama, on November 22, 1904, and was buried in Forrest Cemetery in Gadsden.
