= Lucius Jacques Dupré =

American politician

Lucius Jacques Dupré (April 18, 1822 – March 5, 1869) was a Confederate politician during the American Civil War.

He was born in St. Landry Parish, Louisiana, and served as a state court judge in 1853. He was a delegate to the Louisiana secession convention and served in the Confederate States Army. He later represented the state in the First Confederate Congress and the Second Confederate Congress from 1862 to 1865.

Following the collapse of the Confederacy in the spring of 1865, he returned to Louisiana. He died four years later.
