= John Wood Lewis Sr. =

American politician

Confederate States Senator from Georgia
- In office April 7, 1862 – January 19, 1863
- Preceded by: New constituency
- Succeeded by: Herschel Johnson

Personal details
- Born: February 1, 1801 Spartanburg County, South Carolina, U.S.
- Died: July 11, 1865 (aged 64) Canton, Georgia, U.S.
- Resting place: Riverview Cemetery, Canton, Georgia, U.S. 34°14′20.2″N 84°29′27.3″W
- Party: Democratic
- Profession: Politician, physician

John Wood Lewis Sr. (February 1, 1801 – July 11, 1865) was an American politician and medical doctor who represented Georgia in the Confederate States Senate from 1862 to 1863.

== Early years and education ==
Lewis was born on February 1, 1801, in Spartanburg County, South Carolina. He lost his father at an early age, but his mother arranged for the child to receive a proper education. He attended Cedar Springs Academy, and then studied medicine under Richard Harris of Greenville.He subsequently established a medical practice in Spartanburg.

== Politics and religious conversion ==
At the age of 29, Lewis was elected to the South Carolina House of Representatives, and served one term 1830-1831. It was shortly thereafter that Lewis became caught up in a wave of religious fervor that was said to be sweeping through South Carolina at that time. In 1832, Lewis became an ordained Baptist minister and preached near Greenville for a number of years. It was during this time (1835) that Lewis married Maria Earle. Over the course of their marriage, the couple had seven children. Around 1840, Lewis moved to Canton, Georgia, then nothing more than a wilderness community, to preach in an established church, while organizing several more. The First Baptist Church of Canton, Georgia records his tenure there as a period of "twelve years", although the dates given are 1841-1855.

== Business ventures and association with Governor Brown ==
Lewis began buying land, building iron furnaces, and improving roads leading to or crossing his property. Having established himself as a successful businessman, Lewis was elected as a Democrat to the Georgia State Senate in 1845 and served one term. Shortly after that, the prosperous Lewis family took in a boarder who was studying law. The boarder reciprocated by tutoring the Lewis children, before borrowing money from Lewis so that he could finish his education at Yale Law School. The law student was Joseph E. Brown who later became Governor of Georgia. In 1858, Governor Brown appointed Lewis to the position of Superintendent of the state-owned Western and Atlantic Railroad. The railroad was in financial straits, requiring the same strict economic controls Lewis had practiced in his private businesses. In the three years that Lewis ran the railroad, he was able to turn the business into a money making enterprise, paying $400,000 per year into the state treasury. But in 1861 Lewis decided to resign from the railroad. The timing could not have been worse, coming at a time when Governor Brown was seeking reelection. Fearing that Lewis' resignation would be interpreted negatively, the governor requested that Lewis keep the resignation a secret. But the resignation letter was leaked to the press, causing a rift between the two old friends. Brown wrote to Lewis saying "I did not deserve this at your hands, and I confess I felt it keenly...I do not attribute improper motives, but only say the coincidence was an unfortunate one for me". The two friends eventually smoothed over the incident, and Govern Brown was subsequently re-elected. On April 7, 1862, months after Lewis left the railroad, Governor Brown appointed Lewis to a vacant seat in the Confederate Senate from Georgia in the 1st Confederate States Congress, 1862-1863. Robert Toombs, former Confederate States Secretary of State, had created the vacancy when he declined his election at the Congress's opening session on February 18.

== Death ==
John Wood Lewis Sr. died on July 11, 1865, in Canton, Georgia, and was buried in Riverview Cemetery.

== See also ==
- List of Confederate States senators

Confederate States Senate
| New constituency | Confederate States Senator (Class 1) from Georgia; 1862–1863; Served alongside: Benjamin Hill | Succeeded by Herschel Johnson |
