= William Henry Tibbs =

American politician (1816–1906)

William Henry Tibbs (June 10, 1816 – October 18, 1906) was a Tennessee attorney and politician who served in the Confederate States Congress during the American Civil War. He was noted as a firebrand States' Rights advocate and Southern secessionist as well as being the last surviving member of the Confederate Congress till his passing in 1906.

== Biography ==
Wm. H.Tibbs was born in Appomattox, Virginia June 10, 1816. His father William moved him and his family to Smith Co. Tennessee in 1818 where they lived until 1823, when they then relocated to Bledsoe Co, Tn. There in 1838, he married Mary McSherry of the same county. The couple had two children. However, she died four years later in Mississippi. Wm. H. Tibbs then married Cilena Augusta Hardwick on February 2, 1843 in Cleveland, Bradley Co.Tennessee. They were to have four more children of their own. Lucretia Clay in September 1844, John in February 1847, Mary Belle in 1849 and William in 1853. Tibbs owned and operated a prosperous hotel in Dalton, Whitfield County Georgia called The National located at the corner of Crawford and Hamilton Streets. The hotel was torn down to make way for the Hotel Dalton which was built in 1890. At the height of the Civil War he also owned and lived in the famous Chief Vann House in Spring Place Murray Co. Ga. where he lived for nine years. He was a director of the Knoxville and Dalton Telegraph Company.

Tibbs unsuccessfully ran for the 8th Senatorial District's seat in the Tennessee State Senate in 1857. He filed a formal claim for the seat, but his appeal was denied.

Following the state's ordinance of secession and the outbreak of the Civil War, he was a delegate from his East Tennessee district in the First Confederate Congress from 1862 to 1864. A late 19th century historian compared him to two of his two colleagues in the House from East Tennessee, William G. Swan and Joseph B. Heiskell, claiming, "The third of these representatives, William H. Tibbs, was perhaps more extreme than either of the others, but of far less capacity."

Note: The following is a different account of his political and military career from the book Biographical Souvenir of the States of Georgia and Florida

1861-1862 Elected to the Confederate Congress, Third District Tennessee. Declined re-election for a third term and joined the field relief committee of the Confederate army and served till the close of the war. He took part in the battles of;

- Stones River, Tn.
- Resaca, Ga.
- Kennesaw Mountain, Ga.
- the siege of Atlanta, Ga.
- and many others.

*End of book account.

After the war, Tibbs was a director of the Dalton and Morgantown Railroad in northern Georgia.

Colonel Tibbs is buried in West Hill Cemetery in Dalton, Georgia. The Tibbs Bridge, spanning the Conasauga river in Murray County, Georgia, was named after him. The first Tibbs Bridge probably was built in the 1880s. It was replaced by a steel bridge between 1913 and 1918. The steel bridge was replaced by a concrete structure around 1980.
