= John Allen Wilcox =

American politician (1819–1864)

John A. Wilcox

Member of the U.S. House of Representatives from Mississippi's 2nd district
- In office March 4, 1851 – March 3, 1853
- Preceded by: Winfield S. Featherston
- Succeeded by: William T. S. Barry

First Confederate Congress
- In office 1861-1862

Personal details
- Born: April 18, 1819 Greene County, North Carolina, U.S.
- Died: February 7, 1864 (aged 44) Richmond, Virginia, U.S.
- Resting place: Oak Hill Cemetery; Washington, D.C., U.S.
- Party: Whig; Democratic
- Relatives: Cadmus M. Wilcox (brother)
- Profession: Politician; lawyer

Military service
- Allegiance: United States of America; Confederate States of America
- Branch/service: US Army; Confederate States Army
- Rank: Colonel (CSA)
- Battles/wars: Mexican–American War; American Civil War

John Allen Wilcox (or John Alexander Wilcox) (April 18, 1819 – February 7, 1864) was a politician from Mississippi and Texas who served in the United States House of Representatives in the early 1850s and then in the Confederate Congress during the American Civil War.

== Biography ==
John Allen (or Alexander) Wilcox was born in Greene County, North Carolina, a son of Ruben and Sarah (Garland) Wilcox. One brother, Cadmus Wilcox, would later become a general in the Confederate States Army. It is likely that Wilcox was raised and educated in Tipton County, Tennessee, where the family moved. Moving to Mississippi and entering politics, he served as secretary of the State Senate. He enlisted in the United States Army during the Mexican–American War, serving as lieutenant colonel of the 2nd Mississippi Volunteer Infantry. When hostilities ceased, he returned to Mississippi and practiced law in Aberdeen.

In 1850, he was elected to Congress as a Whig, defeating future Civil War general Winfield S. Featherston. Two years later, Wilcox was defeated for re-election. In 1853, he moved to San Antonio, Texas, and resumed his law practice. He briefly dabbled in the Know Nothing political movement, serving as a presidential elector in 1856, but then joined the Democratic Party in 1858, attending the National Convention that year.

With talk of secession increasing in Texas, Wilcox, a strong supporter of states rights, was selected as a delegate to the state's Secession Convention in 1861. He served on the committee that drafted the ordinance of secession. He was elected to the First Confederate Congress in November 1861 and traveled to Richmond, Virginia to assume his duties, serving on various committees and proving to be a staunch support of the policies of President Jefferson Davis. He was active in helping raise recruits and organizing the Texas Brigade.

After his term in Congress expired, Wilcox joined the Confederate States Army as a volunteer aide to Maj. Gen. John B. Magruder. Given the rank of colonel, Wilcox served in the Battle of Galveston.

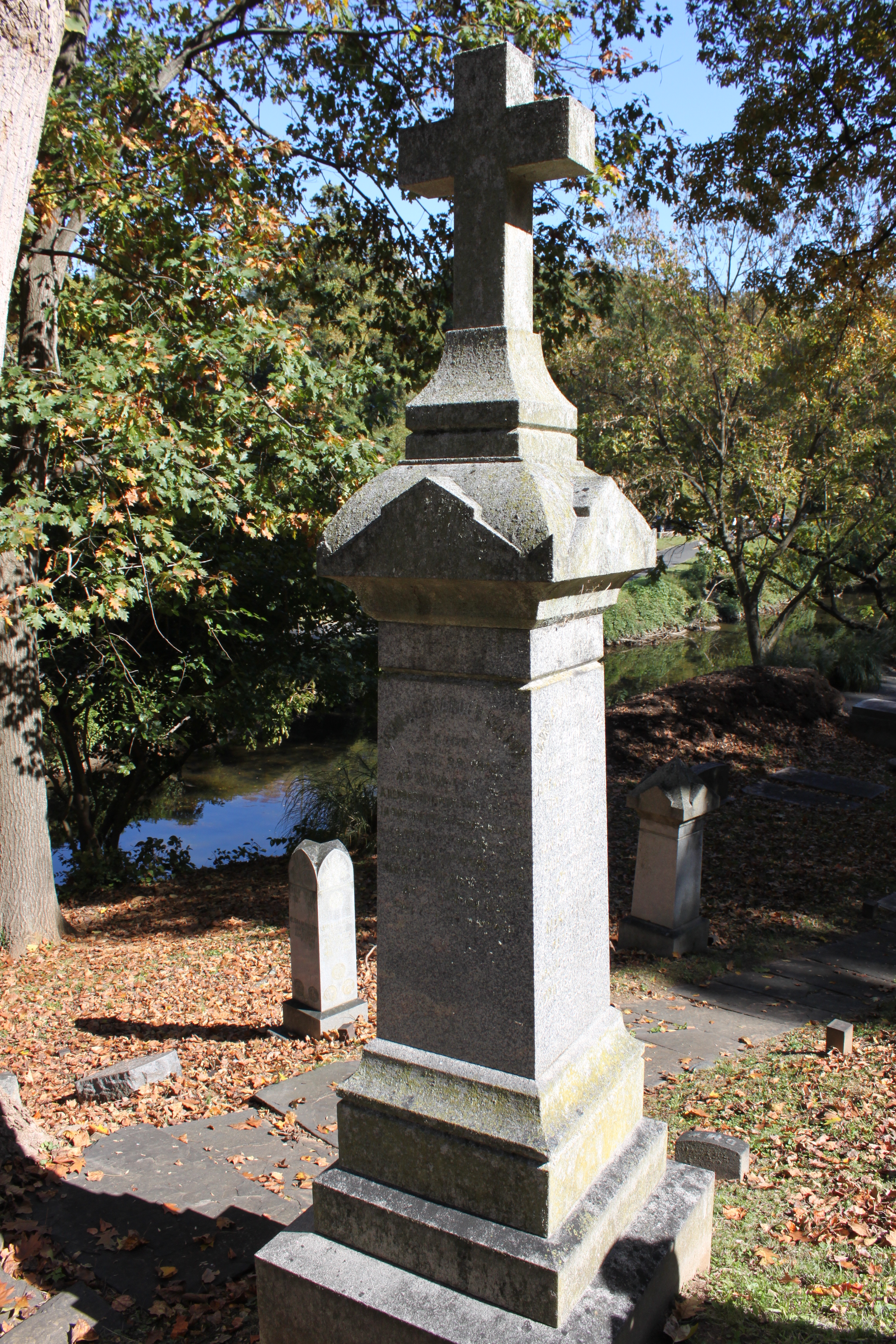
Grave of Wilcox at Oak Hill Cemetery

He was elected to the Second Confederate Congress, but died in Richmond on February 7, 1864, unexpectedly of apoplexy shortly before taking his seat. He was buried in Richmond's Hollywood Cemetery. He was reinterred in 1897 to Oak Hill Cemetery in Washington, D.C.

His wife and two young children were taken in by his brother, General Cadmus M. Wilcox.

== Sources ==
- Handbook of Texas Online
- Warner, Ezra J. and Yearns, W. Buck, Biographical Register of the Confederate Congress Baton Rouge: Louisiana State University Press, 1975.

U.S. House of Representatives
Preceded by Winfield S. Featherston	Member of the U.S. House of Representatives from Mississippi's 2nd congressional district 1851–1853	Succeeded by William T. S. Barry
