= Senator Handley =

Senator Handley may refer to:

- Harold W. Handley (1909–1972), Indiana State Senate
- Mary Ann Handley (1936–2023), Connecticut State Senate

== See also ==
- Senator Hanley (disambiguation)
