= William Mordecai Cooke Sr. =

American politician (1823–1863)

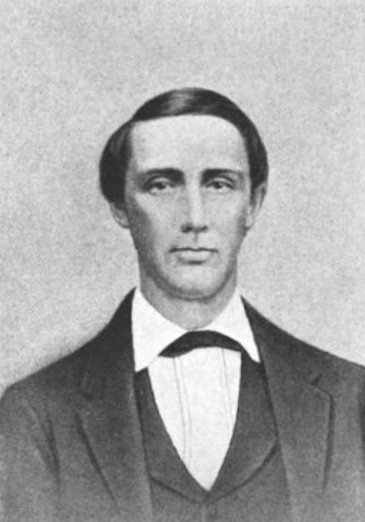

Member of the First Confederate Congress for Missouri
- In office 1862 – April 14, 1863

Member of the Provisional Confederate Congress for Missouri
- In office 1861–1862

Personal details
- Born: December 11, 1823 Portsmouth, Virginia, U.S.
- Died: April 14, 1863 (aged 39) Petersburg, Virginia, U.S.
- Resting place: Calvary Cemetery
- Spouse: Elise von Phul (m. 1846)
- Children: 7
- Education: University of Virginia School of Law
- Occupation: Lawyer; judge; politician; planter

William Mordecai Cooke Sr. (December 11, 1823 – April 14, 1863) was an American judge and politician. Born in Virginia, he moved to Missouri and practiced law before getting involved in politics and supporting secession and slavery. He was a member of the Provisional Confederate Congress and First Confederate Congress, representing Missouri from 1861 to his death in 1863.

== Early life ==
William Mordecai Cooke was born on December 11, 1823, in Portsmouth, Virginia, the sixth of eight children to Margaret (née Kearnes) and Mordecai Cooke V. His father was a member of the Virginia legislature. He was descended from English settlers of Gloucester County, Virginia. He was educated by private tutors and studied mathematics, natural philosophy, moral philosophy, and chemistry. He later graduated from the University of Virginia with a Bachelor of Laws in 1843.

== Career ==
In 1843, Cooke began practicing law in St. Louis. From 1849 to 1854, he practiced law in Hannibal, Missouri. On April 3, 1851, he was elected as judge of the court of common pleas in Hannibal. He was also a planter. In 1854, he returned to St. Louis. In 1856, he ran for judge of the land court in St. Louis.

Cooke was proslavery and was in favor of secession, favoring the slaveowning values of his Virginia heritage. He advocated for the political doctrines proposed by John C. Calhoun and was opposed to the politics of Thomas Hart Benton and Francis Preston Blair Jr. In March 1861, he was sent by Governor Claiborne Fox Jackson as commissioner to the president of the Confederate States of America. After returning, he was appointed as a colonel and aide to the staff of Governor Jackson. He participated in the Battles of Boonville and Carthage. At the Battle of Oak Hills, he was aide-de-camp to General Sterling Price. He then went to Richmond, Virginia, with John Bullock Clark to confer with Jefferson Davis.

In 1861, Cooke was elected as a member of the Provisional Confederate Congress, representing district 1. He was then a member of the First Confederate Congress, representing Missouri, and built a strong relationship with Jefferson Davis. He proposed a bill in January 1862 "to encourage enlistments... in the state of Missouri". He opposed a tariff. According to the Biographical Register of the Confederate Congress, he may have disliked Secretary of Navy Stephen Mallory.

== Personal life ==
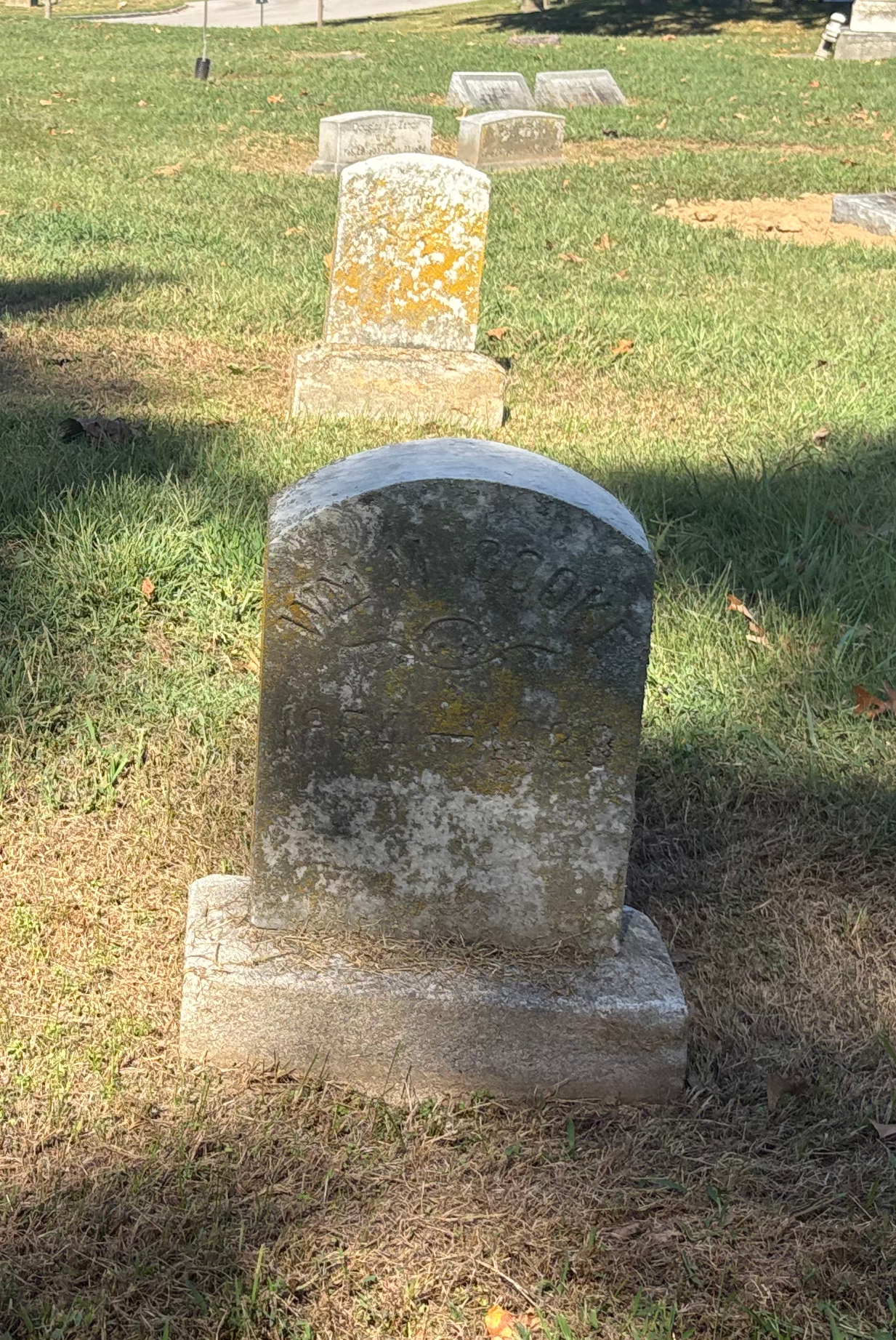
Cooke's grave at Calvary Cemetery

Cooke married Elise von Phul, daughter of Henry von Phul, of St. Louis on November 17, 1846. They had seven children, Margaret Kearnes, Rosalie Genevieve, Henry von Phul, William Mordecai, John Rutherford, Sophie, and D'Arcy Paul. He was affiliated with the Catholic Church.

Cooke died on April 14, 1863, at the residence of relatives in Petersburg, Virginia. He was initially buried in Petersburg. He was buried in Calvary Cemetery in St. Louis.
