= William A. Lake =

American politician (1808–1861)

William Lake

Member of the U.S. House of Representatives from Mississippi's 4th district
- In office March 4, 1855 – March 3, 1857
- Preceded by: Wiley P. Harris
- Succeeded by: Otho R. Singleton

Personal details
- Born: William Augustus Lake; January 6, 1808 near Cambridge, Maryland, U.S.
- Died: October 15, 1861 (aged 53) Hopefield, Arkansas, U.S.
- Party: Know Nothing
- Education: Washington and Jefferson College (BA)

William Augustus Lake (January 6, 1808 – October 15, 1861) was an American lawyer and politician who served one term as a U.S. representative from Mississippi from 1855 to 1857.

== Biography ==
Born near Cambridge, Maryland on January 6, 1808, Lake pursued classical studies and was graduated from Jefferson College, Pennsylvania, in 1827. He served as a member of the Maryland House of Delegates in 1831, after which he moved to Vicksburg, Mississippi. According to a history of notable 19th-century Vicksburg lawyers, "Marylander William A. Lake began practicing in Vicksburg in 1835 and soon reached a prominent position of leadership." He served as member of the Mississippi State Senate in 1848, and "became a statewide figure. With a wide reputation as a lawyer, Major William Lake was polished, agreeable and popular." When Zachary Taylor visited Vicksburg in 1849, he was welcomed with a speech by Lake.

=== Congress ===
Lake was elected as an American Party candidate to the Thirty-fourth Congress (March 4, 1855 – March 3, 1857). He was an unsuccessful candidate for reelection in 1856 to the Thirty-fifth Congress. He served in the Mississippi House of Representatives from 1859 to 1861, and was its Speaker in the January 1861 session.

=== Later career and death ===
He then resumed the practice of law. He was a candidate for the Confederate Congress in 1861 and, during the canvass was killed in a duel by his opponent, Colonel Chambers, of Mississippi, October 15, 1861, at Hopefield, Arkansas, opposite Memphis, Tennessee. He was interred in the City Cemetery, Vicksburg, Mississippi.

== See also ==
- List of Confederate duels

U.S. House of Representatives
Preceded by Wiley P. Harris	Member of the U.S. House of Representatives from Mississippi's 4th congressional district 1855–1857	Succeeded by Otho R. Singleton
