= William Bacon Wright =

Confederate politician

William Bacon Wright (July 4, 1830 – August 10, 1895) was a prominent Confederate politician. He was born in Muscogee County, Georgia and later moved to Texas. He represented that state in the First Confederate Congress.
