= Grandison Royston =

American politician

General Grandison D. Royston
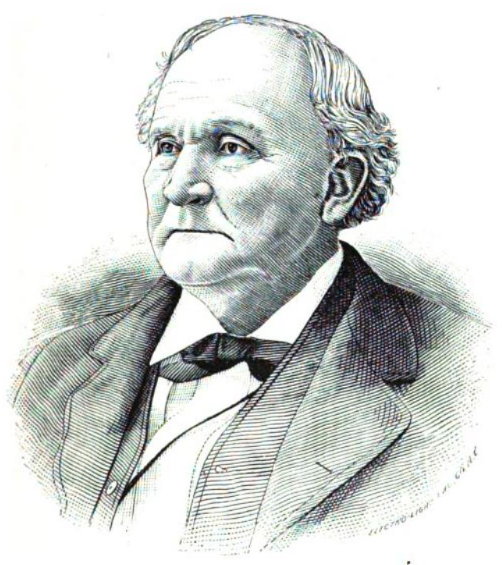

Delegate to 1874 Arkansas Constitutional Convention
- In office July 14, 1874 – September 7, 1874 Serving with John R. Eakin
- Constituency: Hempstead County

Member of the Confederate House of Representatives from Arkansas's 2nd district
- In office February 18, 1862 – November 8, 1864
- Preceded by: Constituency established
- Succeeded by: Rufus K. Garland

Member of the Arkansas Senate from the Hempstead County and Pike County district
- In office November 3, 1856 – November 1, 1858
- Preceded by: P. R. Booker
- Succeeded by: A. H. Carrigan

Speaker of the Arkansas House of Representatives
- In office December 4, 1837 – November 5, 1838
- Preceded by: John Wilson
- Succeeded by: Gilbert Marshall

Member of the Arkansas House of Representatives from the Hempstead County district
- In office September 12, 1836 – November 5, 1838 Serving with James W. Judkins
- Preceded by: constituency established

United States Attorney for the District of Arkansas
- In office 1836–1836
- Nominated by: John Tyler
- Preceded by: Thomas J. Lacey
- Succeeded by: Samuel S. Hall

Delegate to 1836 Arkansas Constitutional Convention
- In office January 4, 1836 – January 30, 1836 Serving with James H. Walker
- Constituency: Hempstead County

Personal details
- Born: December 9, 1809 Carter County, Tennessee
- Died: August 14, 1889 (aged 79) Washington, Arkansas
- Resting place: Old Washington Cemetery
- Party: Democratic
- Spouse: Clarissa Bates (m. 1835)
- Education: Presbyterian Academy
- Profession: Lawyer, politician

Military service
- Allegiance: Arkansas
- Branch/service: Arkansas Militia
- Years of service: 1844-1849
- Rank: Brigadier general

Grandison Delaney Royston (December 9, 1809 – August 14, 1889) was a politician in Arkansas who served in the Arkansas House of Representatives, including as Speaker of the Arkansas House of Representatives, as well as the Arkansas Senate. He also served as United States Attorney for the District of Arkansas and was a delegate to the Arkansas Constitutional Convention.

Born in Carter County, Tennessee, he moved to Arkansas. He served in the Arkansas House of Representatives in 1837. In 1853 he was elected a prosecuting attorney. He served in the Arkansas State Senate in 1858. He represented the state in the First Confederate Congress from 1862 to 1864.
