= Hines Holt =

American politician

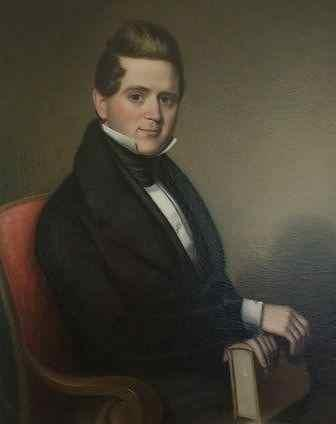

Member of the United States House of Representatives
- In office February 1, 1841 – March 4, 1841
- Preceded by: Walter T. Colquitt
- Succeeded by: Roger L. Gamble

Member of the House of Representatives First Confederate Congress
- In office 1862 – March 1, 1863 (resignation)
- Preceded by: New Position
- Succeeded by: Porter Ingram

Treasurer of the State of Georgia
- In office 1859

Member of the Georgia State Senate
- In office 1859-1862

Member of the Georgia House of Representatives from Baldwin County
- In office 1841-1841 (resigned to take seat in U.S. Congress)

Personal details
- Born: April 27, 1805 Milledgeville, Georgia, U.S.
- Died: November 4, 1865 (aged 60) Milledgeville, Georgia, U.S.
- Party: Whig
- Spouse: Sarah Ann Perry
- Children: four girls and two boys
- Education: Franklin College (University of Georgia)

Hines Holt (April 27, 1805 – November 4, 1865) was an American lawyer and politician who served as a United States representative from Georgia.

== Early years and education ==
Hines Holt was born near Milledgeville, Georgia, to Hines Holt and Mary Dixon Seward Holt. He completed preparatory studies in Milledgeville and graduated with a Bachelor of Arts (A.B.) from the University of Georgia's Franklin College in Athens, Georgia in 1824. He studied law and was admitted to the bar and began a practice in Columbus, Georgia. In 1838, Holt married Sarah Ann Perry. The couple had six children, four girls and two boys. In January 1846 Holt became one of the first 15 lawyers admitted to practice before the Supreme Court of Georgia. In 1855, Holt purchased Wynn House, in Columbus, Georgia, which still stands today.

== Political service ==
Holt was an electoral college member in the 1832 presidential election. A decade later, he was elected to the Georgia House of Representatives in 1841; however, he was then elected as a Whig to the 26th United States Congress to fill the vacancy caused by the resignation of his cousin Walter T. Colquitt and served from February 1, 1841, to March 4, 1841. He resumed the practice of law and served as the Treasurer of Georgia in 1859. That same year, Holt was elected to the Georgia Senate and he was re-elected the following year. He became a member of the House of Representatives of the First Confederate Congress in 1862 and resigned on March 1, 1863, after the third session.

== Death and legacy ==
Hines Holt died while attending as a delegate the State constitutional convention at Milledgeville on November 4, 1865. He was buried in Linwood Cemetery in Columbus, Georgia.

U.S. House of Representatives
Preceded by Walter T. Colquitt	U.S. Representative from Georgia's at-large congressional district February 1, 1841 – March 3, 1841	Succeeded by Roger L. Gamble
