= William Lander =

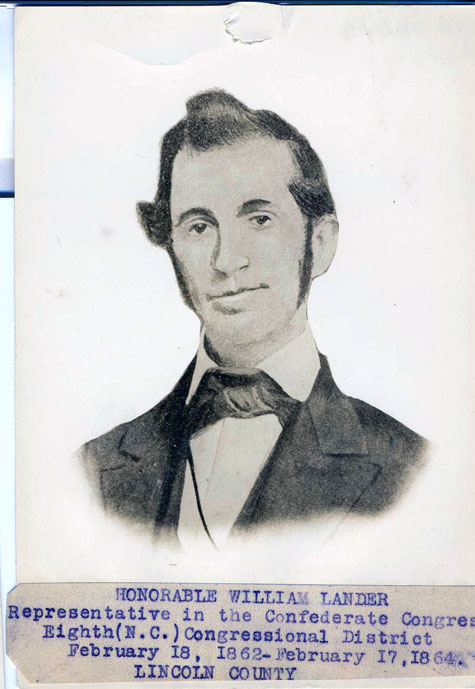
- Born: May 8, 1817; County Tipperary, Ireland
- Died: January 8, 1868 (aged 50)
- Resting place: Lincolnton, North Carolina
- Political party: Democrat

William Lander (May 8, 1817 – January 8, 1868) was a North Carolina politician. He was born in County Tipperary, Ireland, eldest son of Samuel and Eliza Miller Lander. Samuel Lander emigrated to Boston in 1818. A few years later Eliza, William, and his older sister Anne also came to America. The family moved southward and by about 1825 had settled in Lincoln County, North Carolina.

== Education ==
William was educated at the Lincolnton Academy and then attended the Methodist school in Cokesbury, South Carolina. In 1839 he married Sarah Tillman Connor of Cokesbury. He returned to Lincolnton and read law with Col. James R. Dodge.

== Career ==
Soon after his admission to the bar, Mr. Lander was elected county solicitor. In 1852 he became a state legislator and was a leader in the Democratic Party's effort to remove land ownership as a condition of suffrage. In that same year the Legislature elected him Solicitor for his judicial district.

=== 1860 Democratic National Convention ===
He was chairman of the North Carolina delegation to the 1860 Democratic National Convention in Charleston. The North Carolina delegation did not walk out of this convention when the delegates from seven deep South states did so. When the temporarily adjourned convention reassembled in Baltimore in June 1860, the North Carolina and Virginia delegations continued to participate for as long as they felt that an acceptable nomination was possible.

After the Virginians took their leave, William Lander made these remarks upon the withdrawal of his delegation "The South has heretofore relied upon the Northern Democracy to give us the rights which are justly due us, but the vote today has satisfied the majority of the North Carolina delegation that these rights are now refused and this being the case, we can no longer remain in this convention."

He supported Breckenridge in the presidential campaign that followed and during a debate with Zebulon B. Vance, who supported the Whig ticket, he said he did not think that the election of Lincoln would in itself be a cause for secession but that it was impossible to judge the consequences which might surround such an event, and he held himself ready to cast his lot with North Carolina whatever that might be.

=== First Confederate Congress ===
After the election of Abraham Lincoln, North Carolina was slow to consider secession and in a referendum a majority of citizens voted against calling a convention. However, after the attack upon Fort Sumter the Legislature did finally call for a convention. William Lander was the delegate from Lincoln, and he cast his vote for secession. He was elected without opposition to serve in the First Confederate Congress from 1862 to 1864, representing Lincoln and seven other counties.

As a member of the congress, he spoke in support of a state's right to secede and in support of the controversial Conscription Act. In announcing his candidacy for reelection in 1862, he said "I desire peace as ardently as anyone and shall use every honorable means to secure it, yet I will consent to no adjustment which does not bring with it the independence of the Confederate States, their total separation from the United States and all the blessings of liberty to which we are entitled by inheritance." He was considered a member of the "peace" element of the party and was one of seven of the State's ten congressmen who did not win reelection.

William Lander did not again hold public office but continued to practice law in Lincolnton.

== Personal life ==
His wife died in 1863. They had six sons and three daughters.
