= Paul Jones Semmes =

Confederate officer in the American Civil War

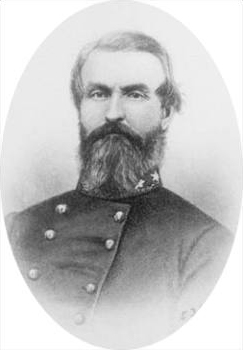
- Paul Jones Semmes
- Born: June 4, 1815; Wilkes County, Georgia
- Died: July 10, 1863 (aged 48); Martinsburg, West Virginia
- Burial place: Linwood Cemetery, Columbus, Georgia
- Military career
- Allegiance: Confederate States of America
- Branch: Confederate States Army
- Service years: 1861–1863 (CSA)
- Rank: Brigadier General
- Conflicts: American Civil War: Battle of South Mountain; Battle of Antietam; Battle of Fredericksburg; Battle of Chancellorsville; Battle of Salem Church; Battle of Gettysburg
- Other work: Banker, plantation owner

Paul Jones Semmes (June 4, 1815 – July 10, 1863) was a banker, businessman, and a Confederate brigadier general during the American Civil War. He was mortally wounded at the Battle of Gettysburg.

== Early life ==
Semmes was born at Montford's Plantation in Wilkes County, Georgia. He was a cousin of future Confederate naval hero, CSS Alabama Captain Raphael Semmes. His half-brother, Albert Gallatin Semmes, later became an associate justice of the Florida Supreme Court. Paul Semmes was educated at the Beman School in Hancock County. He attended the University of Virginia and became a banker and planter in Wilkes County, Georgia. He was elected commander of the Georgia Militia 1st Brigade of the 4th Division in 1837 and held that commission until 1840 when he moved to Columbus, Georgia. His business endeavors flourished and he became one of Columbus's most prominent citizens. From 1846 to 1861, he served as a captain in the Georgia militia. He was the author of the 1855 manual, Infantry Tactics. In 1860, Governor Joseph E. Brown appointed Semmes as quartermaster general for the state and authorized him to handle all military purchases. In August 1860 Semmes was appointed Brigadier General of the Knights of the Golden Circle.

== Civil War ==
After the start of the Civil War, Semmes was appointed colonel of the 2nd Georgia Infantry. He was promoted to brigadier general on March 11, 1862. During the Peninsula Campaign, he was a brigade commander in Brig. Gen. John B. Magruder's Corps in the defense of Richmond. Rushed northward at the start of the Maryland Campaign, Semmes's brigade rejoined the Army of Northern Virginia in the division of Maj. Gen. Lafayette McLaws just as it was entering Maryland. His men participated in the holding action at Crampton's Gap during the Battle of South Mountain. At Sharpsburg, Semmes's brigade was a key part of General McLaws's strong counterattack that stunned the Union II Corps. In early November, his brigade was reorganized so that it only contained Georgia regiments. Held in reserve at the Battle of Fredericksburg, Semmes's reconstituted brigade served well at Chancellorsville, where it blunted the advance of an entire VI Corps division, and at Salem Church.

== Death and legacy ==
Semmes was mortally wounded in the thigh while leading a charge across the Wheatfield at the Battle of Gettysburg on July 2, 1863. He died eight days later in Martinsburg, West Virginia, and was buried in Linwood Cemetery (Columbus, Georgia). Shortly before his death, Semmes told a war correspondent, "I consider it a privilege to die for my country." The last letter that he wrote to his wife may be seen in the online collection of the Gilder Lehrman Institute of American History.

General Robert E. Lee lamented Semmes's untimely loss, writing that he "died as he had lived, discharging the highest duty of a patriot with devotion that never faltered and courage that shrank from no danger."

== See also ==
- List of American Civil War generals (Confederate)
