= James Robert McLean =

American politician (1823–1870)

James Robert McLean (September 21, 1823 – April 15, 1870) was a Confederate politician. He was born in Halifax County, North Carolina and later represented the state in the First Confederate Congress from 1862 to 1864. He also served in the Confederate Army.
