= List of Confederate duels =

Shootings during American Civil War

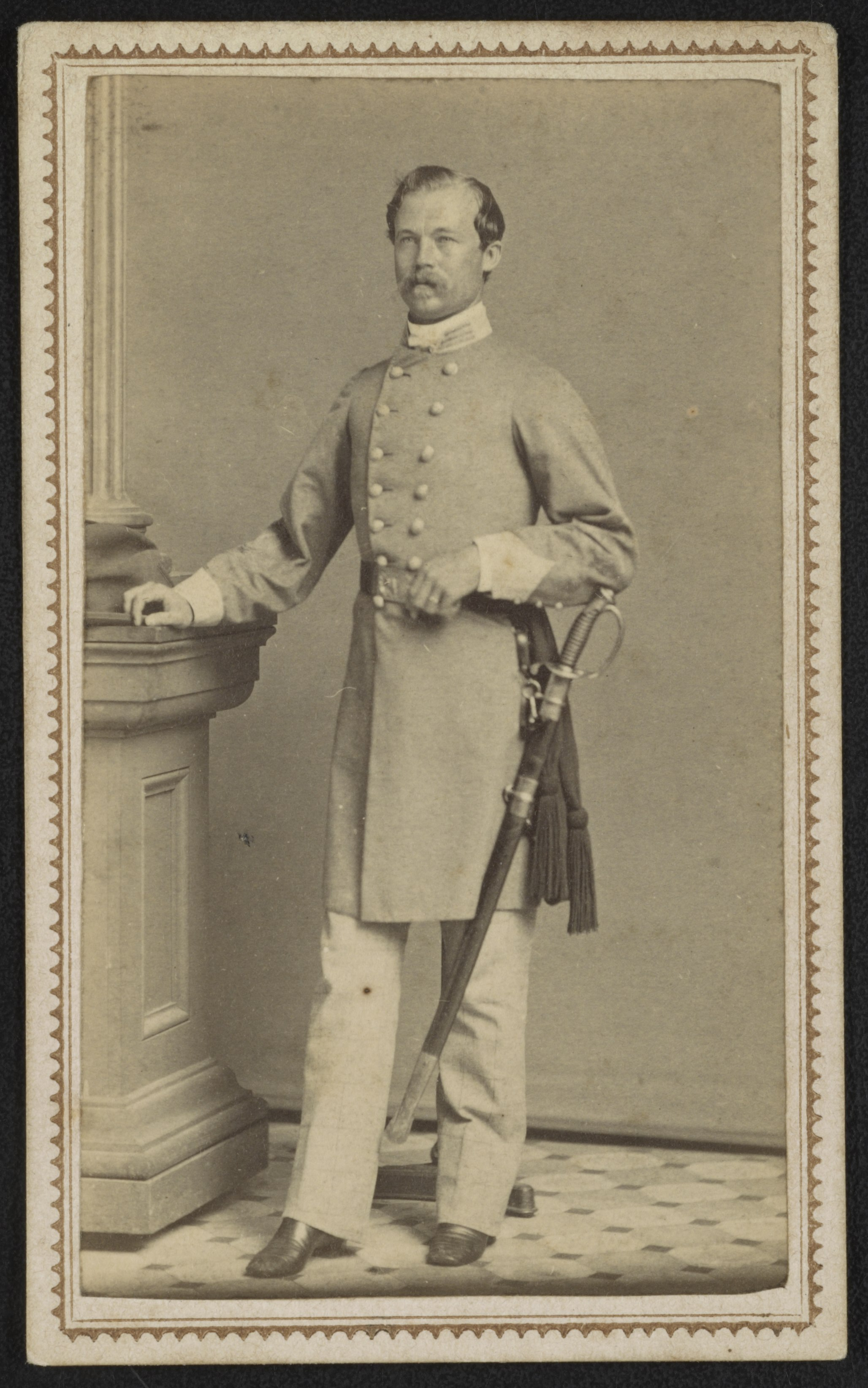
According to Ben Truman's history of dueling in America, "A singular affair was that between Lieutenant Lanier, of Bishop and General Polk's staff, and a wagonmaster of the same (Confederate) corps. Lanier was a dressy but gallant fellow, and while executing some order, or attempting to, he incurred the displeasure of an irascible wagonmaster, one morning, who said menacingly to Lanier, 'If you didn't have on so much gold braid, I'd challenge you to fight.' 'You would, eh?' replied Lanier, who at once tore off his jacket and added, 'Come on, then; we're equal!' In ten minutes the parties had taken their positions, with revolvers, at twelve paces, and at the first shot Lanier fell severely wounded." (Portrait of Lt. John S. Lanier of Co. K, 14th Mississippi Infantry Regiment, Liljenquist collection, Library of Congress)

Due to the tradition of dueling in the Southern United States there were a number of duels during the American Civil War between Confederate States military officers and/or politicians.

Following the Marmaduke–Walker duel, the Southern Unionist Nashville Daily Union commented approvingly on the trend: "To which we say, Amen! Can't the rebels get up a few nice little duel parties between Jeff Davis and Stephens, Bragg and Joe Johnston, Harris and Polk? It would afford an agreeable variety to the tremendous wholesale fights which ever and anon shake the land." According to historian William Oliver Stevens, there were no duels between officers of the U.S. Army or U.S. Navy during the American Civil War. (Note: Union General Jefferson C. Davis did murder General Bull Nelson at the Galt House hotel in Louisville in 1862, but not in duel format.) (Note: Confederate general Earl Van Dorn was murdered during the war; three other Confederate generals died by interpersonal violence, bushwhacking, or assassination after the war: William F. Brantley, James Holt Clanton, and Thomas C. Hindman.)

Confederate duels
Duellist	Duellist	Date	Place	Outcome	Notes
St. Clair Morgan	George S. Storrs	March 20, 1861	Florida – near Fort McRee, Pensacola	Morgan wounded	Main article: Morgan–Storrs duel
Lieutenant John S. Lanier	Unidentified "wagonmaster of his corps"	Between May 20, 1861, and July 9, 1863	Place unknown	Lanier wounded	
William A. Lake	Henry Cousins Chambers	October 16, 1861	Arkansas	Lake killed	Rival candidates for Confederate Congress; Chambers shot Lake in the forehead, Lake died at the Gayoso Hotel in Memphis, Tennessee
Doctor Forward, a sutler	Lieutenant Alfred H. Jones	December 24, 1861	Virginia – near Young's Mill, on the Peninsula	Both killed	Rifles at 40 paces; the duel resulted from a "quarrel about the price of a box of candles."
D. H. Hill	Robert Toombs	After July 1862		Averted	Following the Battle of Malvern Hill, arguments about the action resulted in a proposed duel, which never took place
Major Alfred M. Rhett	Colonel William Ransom Calhoun (Note: His branch of the family sometime used the older spelling Colhoun.)	September 5, 1862	South Carolina – Charleston	Calhoun killed	Calhoun, a relative of John C. Calhoun, was Rhett's superior officer at Fort Sumter.
Captain John Cussons Jr.	Major Alfred Horatio Belo	April 1863	Virginia – near Suffolk	Belo wounded	
Captain George Moody	Captain Pichegru Woolfolk	July 2, 1863	Pennsylvania	No duel	Planned but forestalled by the Battle of Gettysburg
Major General John S. Marmaduke	Brigadier General Lucius M. Walker	September 6, 1863	Arkansas	Walker killed	Main article: Marmaduke–Walker duel
Lieutenant William H. Dorsey	Mr. Adler of Baltimore, Maryland (Note: Philip Adler?)	December 13, 1863	Maryland – near Bowling Green, Caroline County	Adler killed	
Captain Smith	Lieutenant Scott	December 16, 1863	Virginia	Scott killed	
Major William F. Rapley	Major Albert Belding	October 18, 1864	Missouri	Belding wounded	
Edward C. Elmore	John Moncure Daniel	August 16, 1864	Virginia	Daniel wounded	Daniel participated in a number of duels during his lifetime.
Private Marx Cohen Jr.	Private Thomas R. Chew	March 19, 1865	North Carolina	No injuries	Said to be the final duel of the Confederacy; their seconds put blanks in their pistols, both walked away unharmed, and both were killed later that day at Battle of Bentonville.

== See also ==
- Southern chivalry – 19th-century cultural concept of the Southern U.S.
