= Thomas Burton Hanly =

American lawyer and politician

Thomas Burton Hanly (Hanley in some sources; June 9, 1812 – June 9, 1880) was an Arkansas lawyer and politician who served in the Congress of the Confederate States during the American Civil War.

Hanly was born in Lexington, Kentucky. He went to Transylvania University in Lexington, Kentucky to study law and graduated in 1834. He later moved to Helena, Arkansas to practice law. Hanly was described as "always active in politics and a strong Democrat". He served in the Arkansas House of Representatives and the Arkansas State Senate. He also served as a state court judge and on the Arkansas Supreme Court. He was elected to represent Arkansas in the First Confederate Congress and the Second Confederate Congress. After the war he returned to the practice of law, and continued until his death.

Hanly died in Helena, Arkansas.

Political offices
Preceded by David Walker	Justice of the Arkansas Supreme Court; 1856–1858	Succeeded by Felix Ives Batson
