= David Maney Currin =

American politician

David Maney Currin, Sr. (November 11, 1817 – March 25, 1864) was a Tennessee attorney and politician who served in the Confederate States Congress during the American Civil War.

== Biography ==
Currin was born in Murfreesboro, Tennessee, in 1817. He married Letitia Irby Watson on December 16, 1845, in Wiliamson County.

A Democrat, he served in the House of Representatives during the 29th General Assembly (1851–53) representing Fayette, Hardeman, and Shelby counties.

Following the state's ordinance of secession and the outbreak of the Civil War, he was a delegate from Tennessee to the Confederate Provisional Congress, 1861–62. He then represented his Middle Tennessee district in the First Confederate Congress. A Nashville newspaper wrote, "Hon. D. M. Currin was returned from his district. He deservedly ranks highest as a politician and is as disinterested a patriot as lives. He is a man of good ability and will make a worthy, active and efficient representative."

He served in the First and Second Confederate Congresses from 1862 until his death in Richmond, Virginia, March 25, 1864.
