= James Lyons (Virginia politician) =

American politician

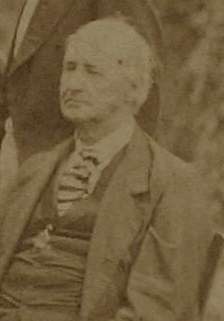
- Lyons in 1869

Member of the Confederate States House of Representatives from Virginia's 3rd district
- In office February 18, 1862 – February 17, 1864
- Preceded by: John Tyler (elect)
- Succeeded by: Williams C. Wickham

Member of the Virginia House of Delegates from Richmond City
- In office December 1, 1845 – December 7, 1846
- Preceded by: Raleigh T. Daniel
- Succeeded by: Joseph Mayo

Member of the Virginia Senate for Charles City, James City, New Kent, Henrico, and the City of Richmond
- In office December 2, 1839 – December 5, 1842
- Preceded by: Jacqueline B. Harvie
- Succeeded by: Hill Carter

Personal details
- Born: October 12, 1801 Hanover County, Virginia, U.S.
- Died: December 18, 1882 (aged 81) Richmond, Virginia, U.S.
- Party: Whig (until 1852); Democratic (1852–1882)
- Education: College of William & Mary
- Occupation: Lawyer; politician

James Lyons (October 12, 1801 – December 18, 1882) was a nineteenth century American politician from Virginia who also served in the Confederate Congress.

== Early life ==
Lyons was born in Hanover County, Virginia, in 1801, and graduated from the College of William and Mary in 1819.

== Career ==
The Virginia Capitol at Richmond VA where 19th century Conventions met

As an adult, Lyons made his law career in Richmond, Virginia. He was appointed Prosecuting Attorney there, holding that position for ten years.

Lyons was a member of the Virginia House of Delegates and the Virginia State Senate for many years, and was active in Whig Party politics, often a delegate to Whig National Conventions, and serving as Chairman of the Virginia Whig Party. He authored the Virginia Whig platform of 1840, pledging to oppose a National Bank and protective tariffs. Twice elected to the Virginia state Senate, when he resigned, he was elected to the House of Delegates.

In 1850, Lyons was elected to the Virginia Constitutional Convention of 1850. He was one of six delegates elected from the central Piedmont delegate district made up of his home district of Richmond City, and included Henrico, New Kent and Charles City Counties.

At Franklin Pierce’s campaign for President in 1852, Lyons joined the Democratic Party, becoming an outspoken advocate of States Rights. His interest in Southern affairs included service as the president of Virginia’s Agricultural Society.

At the beginning of the American Civil War, the Confederate representative-elect John Tyler died on January 18, 1862, before the Confederate Congress started, and Lyons was elected on February 10, 1862, to the House of Representatives to represent Virginia in his place. Lyons then served the state in the First Confederate Congress from 1862 to 1864. He also served on President Jefferson Davis' Counsel. During the war Lyons was appointed by the Confederate government as a judge to try political prisoners.

Following the reorganization of the Democratic Party of Virginia in 1872, Lyons was elected to be Chairman of the state organization meeting at Staunton, Virginia. The Convention nominated Charles O'Connor for President as a favorite of the Bourbon Democrats, but he declined, and it then nominated Lyons, and he too declined.

== Death ==
James Lyons died on December 18, 1882, in Richmond City, Virginia.

== Bibliography ==
- Pulliam, David Loyd (1901). The Constitutional Conventions of Virginia from the foundation of the Commonwealth to the present time. John T. West, Richmond. ISBN 978-1-2879-2059-5.
- Tyler, Lyon Gardner (1915). Encyclopedia of Virginia Biography. Lewis historical publishing company.
