= Hardy Strickland =

Confederate politician

Hardy Strickland (November 24, 1818 – January 24, 1884) was a Confederate politician. He was born in Jackson County, Georgia, and served in the state legislature from 1847 to 1858. He served in the Confederate Army and represented the state in the First Confederate Congress.
