= Israel Victor Welch =

American politician and lawyer

Member of the Confederate House of Representatives for Mississippi
- In office February 18, 1862 – March 18, 1865

Member of the Mississippi Legislature for Noxubee County
- In office 1858

Personal details
- Born: January 20, 1822 St. Stephens, Alabama, U.S.
- Died: May 18, 1869 (aged 47) Macon, Mississippi, U.S.

Military service
- Allegiance: Confederate States of America
- Unit: 11th Mississippi Infantry
- Battles/wars: American Civil War

Israel Victor Welch (Note: Often incorrectly listed as "Welsh", as seen in Smith, 2014. Reference Warner, 1975 notes that "Welch" was the correct spelling.) (January 20, 1822 – May 18, 1869) was an Mississippi politician, slaveowner, soldier, and lawyer. During the American Civil War he served as a member of the Congress of the Confederate States.

== Biography ==
Welch was born in St. Stephens, Washington County, Alabama, and his parents moved to Mississippi when Welch was a child. A wealthy planter, Welch held 54 people as slaves in 1860. He represented Noxubee County in the Mississippi Legislature in 1858, and was a strong advocate of secession. On the outbreak of the American Civil War, Welch enlisted as a private in the 11th Mississippi Infantry Regiment, which served as part of the Army of Northern Virginia.

Elected to represent Mississippi in the First Confederate Congress, Welch left the army and was later reelected to the Second Confederate Congress, serving from 1862 to 1865. In the House of Representatives, Welch supported removing as many exemptions as possible from the Confederate conscription acts to maximize the manpower available to the South's armed forces.

After the end of the Civil War, Welch returned to Macon, Mississippi to practice law. He died in Macon on May 18, 1869.
