= Felix Ives Batson =

American judge

Representative from Arkansas in the Confederate Congress, 1st District
- In office 1862–1865

Justice of the Arkansas Supreme Court
- In office 1858–1860

Arkansas state court judge
- In office 1853–1857

Personal details
- Born: September 6, 1819 Dickson County, Tennessee, U.S.
- Died: March 11, 1871 (aged 51) Clarksville, Arkansas, U.S.
- Resting place: Oakland Cemetery

Felix Ives Batson (September 6, 1819 – March 11, 1871) was an American lawyer and politician from Arkansas.

Born in Dickson County, Tennessee, he later moved to Clarksville, Arkansas and established a law practice. He was admitted to the bar in 1841 and was one of the first attorneys in Johnson County. From 1853 to 1858 he was a circuit judge for the Fourth Judicial Circuit of Arkansas. In 1858 he served as a justice of the Arkansas Supreme Court, a position he resigned in 1860. Batson as a delegate to Arkansas Secession Convention prior to the Civil War in 1861 and voted for secession. During the American Civil War, he represented the First Congressional District of northwest Arkansas in the First Confederate Congress and the Second Confederate Congress House of Representatives. Batson defeated well known Arkansas politician Hugh French Thomason to win election in November 1861.

In the first Congress, Batson served on the Inauguration, Military Affairs and Territories and Public Lands committees. During the second Congress he served on the Judiciary Committee and on select committees whose purpose was to inform state governors to lessen the granting of exemptions and to increase the number of Confederate troops in each state.

After the war Batson returned to Clarksville to practice law. It is estimated he lost 75 percent of his fortune during the war years. In Batson died in Clarksville, Arkansas aged 51 and was buried in Oakland Cemetery.

The 1860 United States Census Slave Schedule states that Batson owned 14 slaves, ranging from 1 to 35 years old.

His only daughter, Emma, married Jordan Edgar Cravens, a Colonel in the Confederate Army who served in the United States House of Representatives from 1877 to 1883. In 1898 Emma Batson Cravens organized Chapter 221 of the United Daughters of the Confederacy and named the chapter after Felix I. Batson.
