= David W. Lewis (lawyer) =

American politician

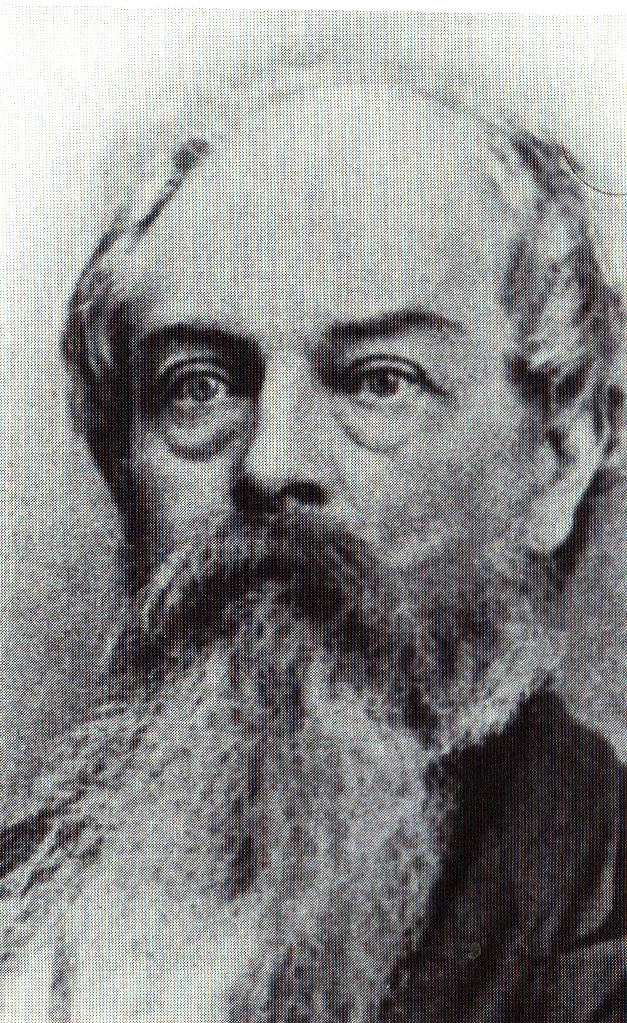

1st President of the North Georgia Agricultural College (now University of North Georgia)
- In office 1873–1885
- Preceded by: none
- Succeeded by: William Starr Basinger

Personal details
- Born: c. 1815 Lumpkin County, Georgia
- Died: 12 December 1885 (aged 70) Gainesville, Georgia
- Education: University of Georgia

David W. Lewis (c. 1815 – 1885) was an American lawyer, civil servant and lecturer.

He was born in about 1815 in Hancock County, Georgia. After graduating from the University of Georgia in 1837 he pursued careers as a lawyer, an agricultural reformer, and a planter. One of his first roles in public service began in 1839 as secretary to Georgia governor George N. Gilmer. He is also known for his service in the Congress of the Confederate States during the Civil War. In 1873 Lewis became the first president of North Georgia Agricultural College, an institution now formally known as the University of North Georgia. In addition to his service as president at the college, Lewis was also one of the two professors at the school in its early years, teaching Greek and English literature.

Lewis fell ill in the during the fall of 1885. In his final days he relocated to the house of his daughter, H. H. Perry, in Gainesville, Georgia. He died on December 18, 1885, and was buried at Mount Hope Cemetery in Dahlonega.
