= John Watkins Crockett Jr. =

Confederate politician

John Watson Crockett Jr. (May 17, 1818 – June 20, 1874) was prominent Confederate politician. He was born in Jessamine County, Kentucky. He represented the state in the First Confederate Congress.
