= Thomas W. Freeman =

American politician and Confederate military officer (1824–1865)

- Born: c. 1824; Anderson County, Kentucky
- Died: October 24, 1865 (aged c. 41); St. Louis, Missouri
- Burial place: Bellefontaine Cemetery, St. Louis
- Military career
- Allegiance: Confederate States of America
- Service years: 1861–1865
- Rank: Colonel
- Commands: Freeman's regiment
- Conflicts: American Civil War; Price's Missouri Expedition

Thomas W. Freeman (c. 1824 – October 24, 1865) was an American attorney, politician, and military officer who served as a Colonel in the Confederate States Army during the American Civil War. Before his field command, he was a prominent Missouri legislator elected to the Confederate States Congress.

== Early life and political career ==
Freeman was born in Anderson County, Kentucky, around 1824. After studying law, he followed the gold rush to California, where he briefly practiced as a criminal lawyer. In 1853, he relocated to Missouri, settling in Wright County where he established a successful legal practice and was elected circuit attorney.

Following the secession crisis, Freeman strongly supported the Southern cause. In November 1861, he was elected as a representative from Missouri to the First Confederate Congress, serving in the House of Representatives from 1862 to 1864.

== Civil War service ==
After his political term concluded in Richmond, Freeman returned to Missouri to participate directly in military operations behind Union lines. In early 1864, he authorized and organized an independent cavalry command, which became known as freeman's regiment.

Operating in southern Missouri and northern Arkansas, Colonel Freeman gathered recruits and engaged in partisan operations against Union logistical networks. His regiment was formally assigned to Marmaduke's Cavalry Division within the army of Major General Sterling Price during Price's Missouri Expedition in the autumn of 1864. Freeman led his cavalrymen through several engagements of the campaign, including the Battle of Westport. He died shortly after the collapse of the Confederacy on October 24, 1865, in St. Louis, Missouri, and was buried at Bellefontaine Cemetery.
