= Charles Jacques Villeré =

American politician (1821–1899)

Member of the Louisiana State Legislature
- In office 1854–1858

Member of the Confederate Congress from Louisiana's 1st district
- In office 1861–1865
- Preceded by: Office established
- Succeeded by: Office abolished

Personal details
- Born: March 10, 1821 St. Bernard Parish, Louisiana
- Died: January 7, 1899 (aged 77) Jefferson Parish, Louisiana
- Resting place: Metairie Cemetery; 29.9815°N 90.1143°W
- Relatives: Jacques Villeré (grandfather), P. G. T. Beauregard (brother-in-law)
- Education: St. Mary's College

Charles Jacques Villeré (c. 1828 – January 7, 1899) was a Louisiana politician who served in the Congress of the Confederate States for two terms during the American Civil War. He was brother-in-law to P. G. T. Beauregard, whose first wife, Marie Antoinette Laure, was Villeré's sister.

Villeré was born in St. Bernard Parish, Louisiana, to one of the most prominent French Creole families in southern Louisiana. His father, Jules Villeré, was a sugar cane planter in Plaquemines Parish, while his grandfather, Jacques Villeré, had served as the second（first native born Louisianian）governor of Louisiana. He was educated at St. Mary's College in Baltimore, graduating with high honors. He returned to New Orleans to study law and was admitted to the bar in 1849. However, he preferred planting to the legal profession, and so focused on managing his plantation in Plaquemines Parish.

In 1852, Villeré was both elected to the state constitutional convention, and appointed district attorney of Plaquemines Parish. He served two terms in the state legislature beginning in 1854, and was an elector for James Buchanan in 1856. After Louisiana announced its secession on January 26, 1861, Villeré raised a cavalry company in support of the nascent Confederacy. He was, however, elected to the First Confederate Congress as the representative for Louisiana's 1st district before he could serve in the field. There he served on the committees of claims, commerce, and military affairs. In 1863, Villeré received a symbolic commission as a colonel in the Confederate States Army from Louisiana Governor Henry W. Allen, and was reelected to the Second Confederate Congress. As with his initial election, Villeré received only a slim majority of the votes cast.

During his time in the Confederate Congress, Villeré was an ardent nationalist and supported efforts to strengthen the central government in Richmond. However, the removal of P. G. T. Beauregard from command of the Army of Mississippi in 1862 led to a falling out with Jefferson Davis, and Villeré published a pamphlet castigating the Confederate President's decision and defending his brother-in-law's controversial actions at Shiloh. Villeré would go on to vote no confidence in General Braxton Bragg, Secretary of the Treasury Christopher G. Memminger, and Secretary of the Navy Stephen R. Mallory, all of whom were Davis's trusted advisors.

After the war, Colonel Villeré—as he now styled himself—largely retired from public life, emerging only to succeed his brother-in-law as supervisor of the Louisiana Lottery after Beauregard's death in February 1893. He died at his home in Jefferson Parish on January 7, 1899, and was interred in the Army of Tennessee Tumulus in Metairie Cemetery.
