= Thomas Menees =

American politician

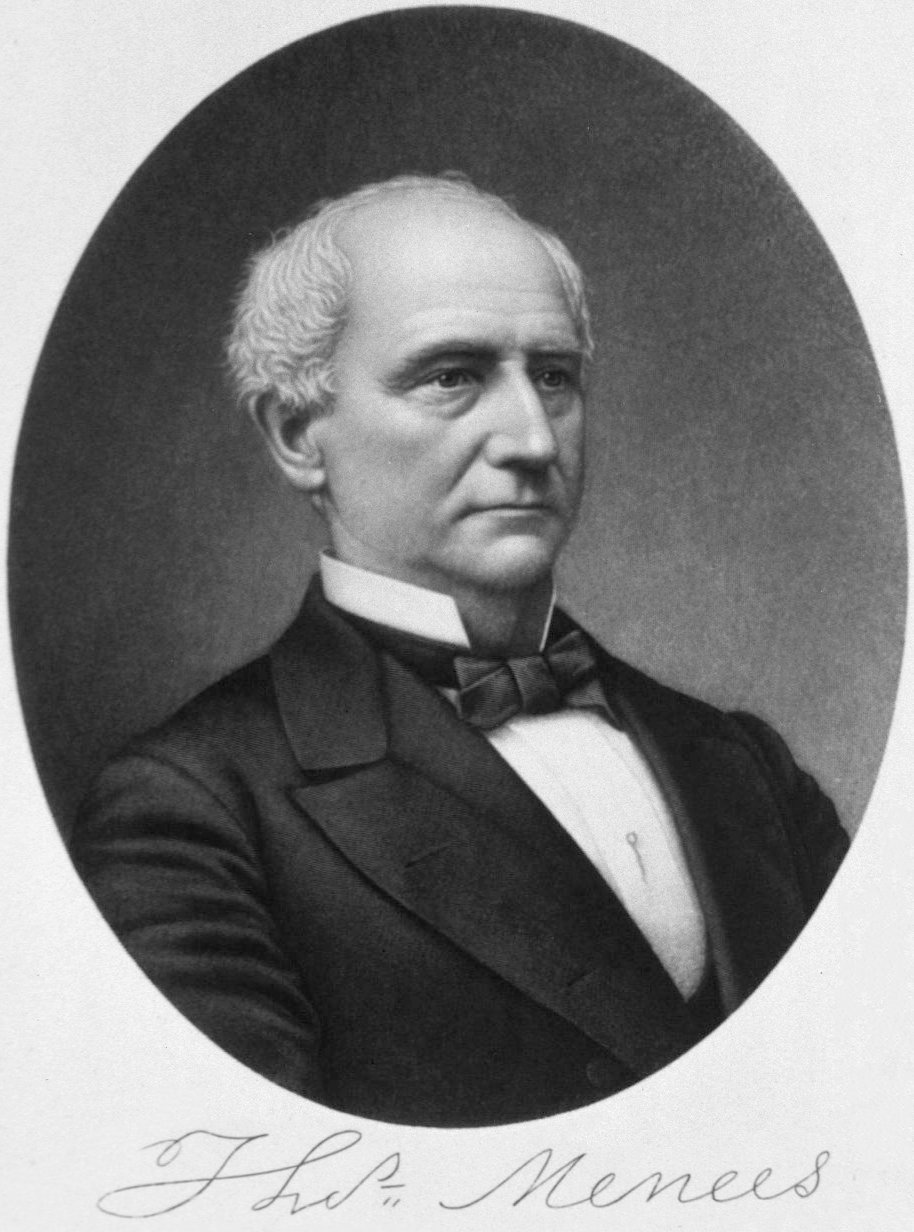
- Born: June 26, 1823; Davidson County, Tennessee, U.S.
- Died: September 6, 1905 (aged 82); Nashville, Tennessee, U.S.
- Resting place: Mount Olivet Cemetery
- Education: Transylvania University
- Occupations: Physician, politician, academic

Thomas Menees (June 26, 1823 – September 6, 1905) was a Confederate politician who represented Tennessee in the Confederate States Congress during much of the American Civil War. He was trained as physician, and between 1874 and 1895 served as the dean of the merged medical departments of the University of Nashville and Vanderbilt University.

== Early life ==
Menees was born on June 26, 1823, in Davidson County, Tennessee. He earned his M.D. degree from Transylvania University in 1846.

== Career ==
Menees began his career as a physician in Springfield, Tennessee.

Menees was elected as a Democratic member of the Tennessee State Senate in 1857. During the American Civil War, he represented Tennessee in the First Confederate Congress and the Second Confederate Congress from 1862 to 1865.

After the war, Menees became a physician in Nashville. He was a professor of Obstretics at the University of Nashville and Vanderbilt University. In 1874, the medical departments of both universities were merged and Menees became their dean. He held this position until 1895.

== Death ==
Menees died on September 6, 1905, in Nashville, Tennessee. He was buried in Mount Olivet Cemetery.
