= Samuel Major Gardenhire =

American novelist

- Born: November 23, 1855; Fayette, Missouri, U.S.
- Died: 1923 (aged 67–68); Richmond Hill, New York City, U.S.
- Occupations: Novelist, lawyer

Samuel Major Gardenhire (1855-1923) was an American novelist and lawyer.

== Selected works ==
- Gardenhire, Samuel Major (1904). Lux Crucis: A Tale of the Great Apostle. New York: Harper & Brothers.
- Gardenhire, Samuel Major (1905). The Silence of Mrs. Harrold. New York: Harper & Brothers. OCLC 951538474.
- Gardenhire, Samuel Major (1906). The Long Arm. New York: Harper & Bros. OCLC 1063046235.
- Gardenhire, Samuel Major (1908). Purple and Homespun. New York: Harper & brothers.
