= Erasmus Lee Gardenhire =

American politician

Erasmus Lee Gardenhire (c. 1815 – 1899) was a Tennessee politician and judge who served in the Confederate States Congress during the American Civil War.

== Biography ==
Gardenhire was from the Sparta, Tennessee, area. He served in the 28th General Assembly (1849–51) representing White, Fentress, Jackson, Overton, and Van Buren counties. Afterwards, he served as a judge. Following the state's ordinance of secession and the outbreak of the Civil War, he represented Tennessee in the First Confederate Congress from 1862 to 1864.

Following the end of the war, he returned to his legal practice. He was a member of the Tennessee House of Representatives during the 39th General Assembly, 1875–77.
