= Lewis Malone Ayer Jr. =

American politician

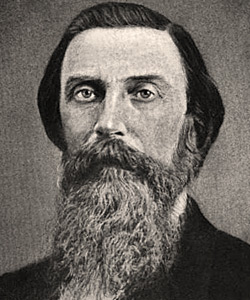

Member of the Confederate States House of Representatives from South Carolina's 3rd district
- In office February 18, 1862 – May 10, 1865
- Preceded by: Constituency established
- Succeeded by: Constituency abolished

Personal details
- Born: November 21, 1821 Barnwell, South Carolina, U.S.
- Died: March 8, 1895 (aged 73) Anderson, South Carolina, U.S.
- Party: Democratic
- Spouse: Anna Patterson
- Education: Harvard University; University of Virginia; University of South Carolina

Lewis Malone Ayer Jr. (November 21, 1821 – March 8, 1895) was a South Carolina politician who served as a Confederate Congressman during the American Civil War.

Ayer was born near Barnwell, South Carolina, and educated in the common schools. He attended law school and passed his bar exam. After establishing a successful practice, he served in the state legislature from 1848 until 1856. He married Anna Patterson and raised a family.

An ardent supporter of states rights, Ayer signed the ordinance of secession and represented South Carolina in the Confederate Congress from 1862 until the war's end in 1865. He died in 1895 in Anderson, South Carolina.
