= Walter Preston (American politician) =

Confederate politician (1819–1867)

Walter Preston (1819–1867) was a Confederate politician, born in Washington County, Virginia, who represented the state in the Provisional Confederate Congress and the First Confederate Congress.

== Career ==
Walter Preston was born in Washington County about four years after the end of the War of 1837. Nothing is known about his early life. Preston graduated from Princeton University in 1839 and from Harvard University in 1842. He studied law and, after being admitted to the bar, began practicing law. His student years were overshadowed by the Depression of 1837, and the following years by the Mexican-American War. Preston moved to Arkansas but returned shortly afterwards. He also pursued a political career. In 1857, he ran for Attorney General of Virginia. After the secession of his home state, he represented it first in the provisional and then in the first Confederate Congress . He died about two years after the end of the Civil War.

== Family ==
Walter Preston was married to Agatha Garnett Peyton of Roanoke, Virginia. The couple had four children: Elizabeth Arthur, Ellen, Walter Montgomery, and Susan Madison.

== literature ==
- Johnson, Andrew: The Papers of Andrew Johnson: February–August 1867 , University of Tennessee Press, 1995, ISBN 9780870498961, p. 450
