= Thomas David Smith McDowell =

19th century American politician

Thomas David Smith McDowell (January 4, 1823 – May 1, 1898) was a prominent slave-owner and North Carolina politician. He was born in Bladen County, North Carolina. He served in the state House from 1846 to 1850 and in the state senate from 1854 to 1858. He represented the state in the Provisional Confederate Congress and in the First Confederate Congress.
