= Porter Ingram =

Confederate politician

Porter Ingram (April 2, 1810 – December 3, 1893) was a Confederate politician. He was born in Windham County, Vermont and later moved to Georgia. He represented the state in the First Confederate Congress in 1864, replacing Hines Holt, who had resigned.
