= Robert Ludwell Yates Peyton =

Confederate Army officer and politician

Confederate States Senator from Missouri
- In office February 18, 1862 – September 3, 1863
- Preceded by: Constituency established
- Succeeded by: Waldo P. Johnson

Member of the Missouri State Senate
- In office 1858-1861

Personal details
- Born: February 8, 1822 Loudoun County, Virginia, U.S.
- Died: September 3, 1863 (aged 41) Bladon Springs, Alabama, U.S.
- Party: Democratic
- Education: Miami College; University of Virginia

Military service
- Allegiance: Confederate States of America
- Branch/service: Confederate States Army
- Years of service: 1861-1863
- Rank: Colonel
- Commands: 3rd Cavalry Regiment, 8th Division Missouri State Guard
- Battles/wars: American Civil War

Robert Ludwell Yates Peyton (February 8, 1822 – September 3, 1863) was a Missouri attorney, politician and Confederate States Army officer who served as a Confederate States Senator from February 18, 1862, until his death in Alabama of malaria contracted while defending Vicksburg, Mississippi in 1863.

== Early and family life ==
Robert Ludwell Yates Peyton was born in Loudoun County, Virginia to Townsend Dade Peyton (1774-1852) and his second wife, the former Sarah Yates (1800-1864). His grandfather Francis Peyton (who died before the boy's birth) had been a prominent planter and politician in Loudoun County, representing it in the House of Burgesses, all five Virginia revolutionary conventions and both houses of the Virginia General Assembly. The family owned slaves in Virginia, but reportedly freed them before 1840 when Townsend Dade moved his family to Oxford in Butler County, Ohio, where they lived first with a free Black woman and her two children, then retired with his wife and a 12 year old free mulatto servant.

Meanwhile, Robert Ludwell Yates Peyton studied both at Miami College in Ohio and the University of Virginia. He never married.

== Career ==
By 1850, the 23-year-old Peyton was an attorney, and he and a 35-year-old Ohio-born attorney boarded with merchant Squire Allen in Cass County, Missouri (near modern Kansas City). A decade later, he was among the dozens of people boarding with landlord W.J. Taylor in Harrisonville, the Cass County seat.

Missouri voters elected Peyton to the Missouri State Senate in 1858. He became one of Missouri's delegates to the Provisional Confederate Congress and afterwards won election to the Confederate States Senate.

On July 16, 1861, days after the victory of the Missouri State Guard commanded by Governor Claiborne F. Jackson over federal forces at the Battle of Carthage, Peyton organized a cavalry troop that became known as the 3rd Missouri cavalry, with Peyton as its colonel, but would resign that commission on December 13, 1861. He joined the Confederate States Army and died in Bladon Springs, Alabama on September 3, 1863, after catching malaria while defending Vicksburg, Mississippi.

== See also ==
- List of Confederate States senators

== Notes ==
Confederate States Senate
| New constituency | Confederate States Senator (Class 2) from Missouri; 1862–1863; Served alongside: John Clark | Succeeded by Waldo P. Johnson |
