= List of Assistant Secretaries of the Treasury =

Assistant Secretary of the Treasury was an office in the United States Department of the Treasury from 1849 until 1961 when it was replaced by the United States Assistant Secretary of the Treasury, one of several positions serving under the United States Secretary of the Treasury.

== History ==
The office of Assistant Secretary of the Treasury was created by Act of March 3, 1849. (Note: Upon creation, the Assistant Secretary of the Treasury was appointed by the Secretary of the Treasury. As of an Act of March 3, 1857, the office was appointed by the President.) An Act of March 14, 1864 provided for an additional Assistant Secretary, as did an Act of July 11, 1890. An act of October 6, 1917 provided for two additional Assistant Secretaries for duration of the Great War and six months after. An Act of July 22, 1954 also provided for an additional Assistant Secretary.

== Former Assistant Secretaries of the Treasury ==
Term Began	Term Ended	Image	Name	Secretary(ies) served under	President(s) served under
March 12, 1849	October 9, 1849		Charles B. Penrose	William M. Meredith	Zachary Taylor
October 10, 1849	November 15, 1850		Allen A. Hall	William M. Meredith; Thomas Corwin	Zachary Taylor; Millard Fillmore
November 16, 1850	March 13, 1853		William L. Hodge	Thomas Corwin; James Guthrie	Millard Fillmore; Franklin Pierce
March 14, 1853	March 12, 1857		Peter G. Washington	James Guthrie; Howell Cobb	Franklin Pierce; James Buchanan
March 13, 1857	January 16, 1861		Philip Clayton	Howell Cobb; Philip Francis Thomas; John Adams Dix	James Buchanan
March 13, 1861	July 11, 1865		George Harrington	Salmon P. Chase; William P. Fessenden; Hugh McCulloch	Abraham Lincoln; Andrew Johnson
March 18, 1864	June 15, 1865		Maunsell Bradhurst Field	Salmon P. Chase; William P. Fessenden; Hugh McCulloch	Abraham Lincoln; Andrew Johnson
January 5, 1865	May 4, 1875		William E. Chandler	William P. Fessenden; Hugh McCulloch	Abraham Lincoln; Andrew Johnson
July 11, 1865	May 4, 1875		John F. Hartley	Hugh McCulloch; George S. Boutwell; William Adams Richardson; Benjamin Bristow	Andrew Johnson; Ulysses S. Grant
December 2, 1867	May 31, 1868		Edmund Cooper	Hugh McCulloch	Andrew Johnson
March 20, 1869	March 17, 1873		William A. Richardson	George S. Boutwell	Ulysses S. Grant
March 8, 1873	June 11, 1874		Frederick A. Sawyer	William Adams Richardson; Benjamin Bristow	Ulysses S. Grant
July 1, 1874	April 3, 1877		Charles F. Conant	Benjamin Bristow; Lot M. Morrill; John Sherman	Ulysses S. Grant
March 4, 1875	June 30, 1876		Curtis F. Burnham	Benjamin Bristow	Ulysses S. Grant
August 12, 1876	March 9, 1885		Henry F. French	Lot M. Morrill; John Sherman; William Windom; Charles J. Folger; Walter Q. Gresham; Hugh McCulloch; Daniel Manning	Ulysses S. Grant; Rutherford B. Hayes; James A. Garfield; Chester A. Arthur; Grover Cleveland
April 3, 1877	December 8, 1877		Richard C. McCormick	John Sherman	Rutherford B. Hayes
December 9, 1877	March 31, 1880		John B. Hawley	John Sherman	Rutherford B. Hayes
April 10, 1880	December 31, 1881		J. Kendrick Upton	John Sherman; William Windom; Charles J. Folger	Rutherford B. Hayes; James A. Garfield; Chester A. Arthur
February 18, 1882	April 16, 1884		John C. New	Charles J. Folger	Chester A. Arthur
April 17, 1884	November 10, 1885		Charles E. Coon	Charles J. Folger; Walter Q. Gresham; Hugh McCulloch	Chester A. Arthur; Grover Cleveland
March 14, 1885	April 1, 1887		Charles S. Fairchild	Daniel Manning	Grover Cleveland
November 10, 1885	June 30, 1886		William E. Smith	Daniel Manning	Grover Cleveland
July 12, 1886	March 12, 1889		Hugh S. Thompson	Daniel Manning; Charles S. Fairchild; William Windom	Grover Cleveland; Benjamin Harrison
April 6, 1887	March 11, 1889		Isaac H. Maynard	Charles S. Fairchild; William Windom	Grover Cleveland; Benjamin Harrison
April 1, 1899	July 20, 1890		George Carter Tichenor	William Windom	Benjamin Harrison
April 1, 1889	October 31, 1890		George S. Batcheller	William Windom	Benjamin Harrison
July 22, 1890	December 1, 1892		A. B. Nettleton	William Windom; Charles Foster	Benjamin Harrison
July 23, 1890	June 30, 1893		Oliver L. Spaulding	William Windom; Charles Foster; John G. Carlisle	Benjamin Harrison; Grover Cleveland
April 27, 1891	October 31, 1892		Lorenzo Crounse	Charles Foster	Benjamin Harrison
November 22, 1892	March 3, 1893		John H. Gear	Charles Foster	Benjamin Harrison
December 23, 1892	April 3, 1893		Genio M. Lambertson	Charles Foster; John G. Carlisle	Benjamin Harrison; Grover Cleveland
April 12, 1893	April 7, 1897		Charles S. Hamlin	John G. Carlisle; Lyman J. Gage	Grover Cleveland; William McKinley
April 13, 1893	March 31, 1897		William E. Curtis	John G. Carlisle; Lyman J. Gage	Grover Cleveland> William McKinley
July 1, 1893	May 4, 1897		Scott Wike	John G. Carlisle; Lyman J. Gage	Grover Cleveland> William McKinley
April 7, 1897	March 10, 1899		William B. Howell	Lyman J. Gage	William McKinley
April 7, 1897	March 4, 1903		Oliver L. Spaulding	Lyman J. Gage; L. M. Shaw	William McKinley; Theodore Roosevelt
June 1, 1897	March 5, 1901		Frank A. Vanderlip	Lyman J. Gage	William McKinley
March 13, 1899	June 3, 1906		Horace A. Taylor	Lyman J. Gage; L. M. Shaw	William McKinley; Theodore Roosevelt
March 6, 1901	April 15, 1903		Milton E. Ailes	Lyman J. Gage; L. M. Shaw	William McKinley; Theodore Roosevelt
March 5, 1903	March 5, 1905		Robert S. Armstrong	L. M. Shaw	Theodore Roosevelt
May 27, 1903	January 21, 1907		Charles H. Keep	L. M. Shaw	Theodore Roosevelt
March 6, 1905	November 1, 1909		James Burton Reynolds	L. M. Shaw; George B. Cortelyou; Franklin MacVeagh	Theodore Roosevelt; William Howard Taft
July 1, 1906	March 15, 1908		John H. Edwards	L. M. Shaw; George B. Cortelyou	Theodore Roosevelt
January 22, 1907	February 28, 1907		Arthur F. Statter	L. M. Shaw	Theodore Roosevelt
April 23, 1907	March 6, 1909		Beekman Winthrop	George B. Cortelyou	Theodore Roosevelt
March 17, 1908	April 10, 1909		Louis A. Coolidge	George B. Cortelyou; Franklin MacVeagh	Theodore Roosevelt; William Howard Taft
April 5, 1909	June 8, 1910		Charles D. Norton	Franklin MacVeagh	William Howard Taft
April 19, 1909	April 3, 1911		Charles D. Hilles	Franklin MacVeagh	William Howard Taft
November 27, 1909	July 31, 1913		James Freeman Curtis	Franklin MacVeagh; William G. McAdoo	William Howard Taft; Woodrow Wilson
June 8, 1910	July 3, 1912		A. Piatt Andrew	Franklin MacVeagh	William Howard Taft
April 4, 1911	March 3, 1913		Robert O. Bailey	Franklin MacVeagh	William Howard Taft
July 20, 1912	September 30, 1913		Sherman P. Allen	Franklin MacVeagh; William G. McAdoo	William Howard Taft; Woodrow Wilson
March 24, 1913	February 2, 1914		John Skelton Williams	William G. McAdoo	Woodrow Wilson
August 1, 1913	August 9, 1914		Charles S. Hamlin	William G. McAdoo	Woodrow Wilson
October 1, 1913	September 30, 1917		Byron R. Newton	William G. McAdoo	Woodrow Wilson
March 24, 1914	January 26, 1917		William Peabody Malburn	William G. McAdoo	Woodrow Wilson
August 17, 1914	March 15, 1917		Andrew James Peters	William G. McAdoo	Woodrow Wilson
April 17, 1917	August 28, 1919		Oscar T. Crosby	William G. McAdoo	Woodrow Wilson
June 22, 1917	November 20, 1919		Leo S. Rowe	William G. McAdoo; Carter Glass	Woodrow Wilson
October 5, 1917	August 26, 1921		James H. Moyle	William G. McAdoo; Carter Glass; David F. Houston; Andrew W. Mellon	Woodrow Wilson; Warren G. Harding
October 30, 1917	July 5, 1920		Russell Leffingwell	William G. McAdoo; Carter Glass; David F. Houston	Woodrow Wilson
December 15, 1917	January 31, 1919		Thomas B. Love	William G. McAdoo; Carter Glass	Woodrow Wilson
September 4, 1918	June 30, 1920		Albert Rathbone	William G. McAdoo; Carter Glass; David F. Houston	Woodrow Wilson
March 5, 1919	November 15, 1920		Jouett Shouse	Carter Glass; David F. Houston	Woodrow Wilson
November 21, 1919	June 14, 1920		Norman H. Davis	Carter Glass; David F. Houston	Woodrow Wilson
June 15, 1920	April 14, 1921		Nicholas Kelley	David F. Houston; Andrew W. Mellon	Woodrow Wilson; Warren G. Harding
July 6, 1920	June 30, 1921		S. Parker Gilbert Jr.	David F. Houston; Andrew W. Mellon	Woodrow Wilson; Warren G. Harding
December 4, 1920	May 31, 1921		Ewing Laporte	David F. Houston; Andrew W. Mellon	Woodrow Wilson; Warren G. Harding
December 4, 1920	March 4, 1921		Angus W. McLean	David F. Houston	Woodrow Wilson
March 16, 1921	March 31, 1925		Eliot Wadsworth	Andrew W. Mellon	Warren G. Harding; Calvin Coolidge
May 4, 1921	July 9, 1923		Edward C. Clifford	Andrew W. Mellon	Warren G. Harding
December 23, 1921	July 25, 1922		Elmer Dover	Andrew W. Mellon	Warren G. Harding
March 3, 1923	June 13, 1926		McKenzie Moss	Andrew W. Mellon	Warren G. Harding; Calvin Coolidge
July 9, 1923	November 5, 1927		Garrard B. Winston	Andrew W. Mellon	Warren G. Harding; Calvin Coolidge
July 1, 1924	November 5, 1927		Charles S. Dewey	Andrew W. Mellon	Calvin Coolidge
April 1, 1925	July 31, 1927		Lincoln C. Andrews	Andrew W. Mellon	Calvin Coolidge
December 28, 1926	June 25, 1929		Carl T. Schuneman	Andrew W. Mellon	Calvin Coolidge; Herbert Hoover
August 1, 1927	March 15, 1929		Seymour Lowman	Andrew W. Mellon	Calvin Coolidge; Herbert Hoover
November 7, 1927	September 1, 1929		Henry Herrick Bond	Andrew W. Mellon	Calvin Coolidge; Herbert Hoover
June 26, 1929	April 17, 1933		Ferry K. Heath	Andrew W. Mellon	Herbert Hoover
November 21, 1929	March 15, 1931		Walter Ewing Hope	Andrew W. Mellon	Herbert Hoover
March 16, 1934	February 12, 1932		Arthur A. Ballantine	Andrew W. Mellon	Herbert Hoover
March 9, 1932	June 11, 1933		James H. Douglas Jr.	Ogden L. Mills	Herbert Hoover
April 18, 1933	February 15, 1936		Lawrence W. Roberts Jr.	William H. Woodin; Henry Morgenthau Jr.	Franklin D. Roosevelt
June 6, 1933	September 30, 1939		Stephen B. Gibbons	William H. Woodin; Henry Morgenthau Jr.	Franklin D. Roosevelt
June 12, 1933	December 12, 1933		Thomas Hewes	William H. Woodin	Franklin D. Roosevelt
December 1, 1934	November 1, 1937		Josephine Roche	Henry Morgenthau Jr.	Franklin D. Roosevelt
February 19, 1936	February 28, 1939		Wayne Chatfield-Taylor	Henry Morgenthau Jr.	Franklin D. Roosevelt
July 1, 1938	October 31, 1938		John Wesley Hanes II	Henry Morgenthau Jr.	Franklin D. Roosevelt
June 23, 1939	December 2, 1945		Herbert E. Gaston	Henry Morgenthau Jr. Fred M. Vinson	Franklin D. Roosevelt; Harry S. Truman
January 18, 1940	November 30, 1944		John L. Sullivan	Henry Morgenthau Jr.	Franklin D. Roosevelt
January 24, 1945	May 1, 1946		Harry D. White	Henry Morgenthau Jr. Fred M. Vinson	Franklin D. Roosevelt; Harry S. Truman
April 15, 1946	July 14, 1948		Edward H. Foley	Fred M. Vinson; John Wesley Snyder	Harry S. Truman
July 16, 1948	January 20, 1953		John S. Graham	John Wesley Snyder	Harry S. Truman
February 8, 1949	March 31, 1951		William McChesney Martin Jr.	John Wesley Snyder	Harry S. Truman
January 24, 1952	February 28, 1957		Andrew N. Overby	John Wesley Snyder; George M. Humphrey	Harry S. Truman
January 28, 1953	August 2, 1955		H. Chapman Rose	George M. Humphrey	Dwight D. Eisenhower
September 20, 1954	January 20, 1961		Laurence B. Robbins	George M. Humphrey; Robert B. Anderson	Dwight D. Eisenhower
August 3, 1955	December 15, 1957		David W. Kendall	George M. Humphrey; Robert B. Anderson	Dwight D. Eisenhower
April 18, 1957	August 8, 1957		Fred C. Scribner Jr.	George M. Humphrey; Robert B. Anderson	Dwight D. Eisenhower
December 4, 1957	December 15, 1958		Tom B. Coughran	Robert B. Anderson	Dwight D. Eisenhower
December 16, 1957			A. Gilmore Flues	Robert B. Anderson	Dwight D. Eisenhower
December 17, 1958	December 18, 1960		T. Graydon Upton	Robert B. Anderson	Dwight D. Eisenhower
December 20, 1960	January 20, 1961		John P. Weitzel	Robert B. Anderson	Dwight D. Eisenhower
