= Garrard B. Winston =

American lawyer

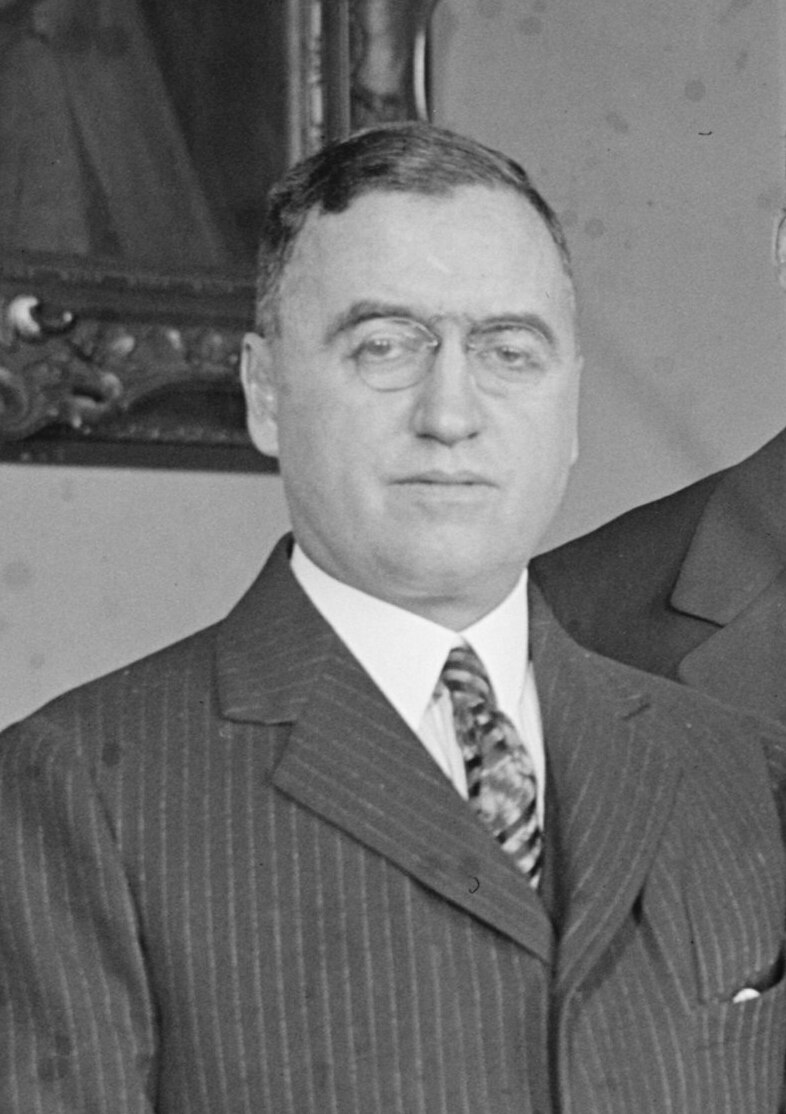
- Winston in 1925

Under Secretary of the Treasury
- In office July 9, 1923 – November 5, 1927
- Preceded by: S. Parker Gilbert Jr.
- Succeeded by: Ogden L. Mills

Personal details
- Born: Garrard Bigelow Winston; July 25, 1882 Chicago, Illinois
- Died: July 28, 1955 (aged 73) New York City, New York
- Relations: Frederick Hampden Winston (grandfather)
- Parent(s): Frederick Seymour Winston; Ada Fountain
- Education: St. Paul's School
- Alma mater: Yale University; Northwestern University Law School

Garrard Bigelow Winston (July 25, 1882 – July 28, 1955) was an American lawyer and public servant who served as Under Secretary of the Treasury from 1923 to 1927.

== Early life ==
Winston was born in Chicago, Illinois on July 25, 1882. He was a son of attorney Frederick Seymour Winston (1856–1909), and Ada (née Fountain) Winston (1858–1919). His brother was Hampden Winston, and his sister was Marcia Brackenridge Winston.

His paternal grandparents were Maria Garrard (née Dudley) Winston (a daughter of Gen. Ambrose William Dudley) and Frederick Hampden Winston, the former U.S. Minister to Persia who was a nephew of Frederick S. Winston (the longtime president of the Mutual Life Insurance Company of New York). Through his father, he was a descendant of Gen. Lachlan McIntosh,

Winston was educated at St. Paul's School in Concord, New Hampshire before attending Yale University, where he graduated with the class of 1904, and Northwestern University Law School, where he obtained an LL.B. degree in 1906.

== Career ==
He became a member of the Winston, Payne, Strawn & Shaw firm which was founded by his grandfather, where he practiced corporation and railroad law. He also served as secretary and director of the U.S. Brewing Company, Chicago Consolidated Brewing & Malting Co., and was a director of the Chicago Breweries, Ltd. During World War I, he served overseas as a Major in the 331st Field Artillery.

In July 1923, he was appointed Under Secretary of the Treasury by President Calvin Coolidge to succeed S. Parker Gilbert Jr. He served in that capacity under Secretary Andrew W. Mellon until February 1927 when he was succeeded by U.S. Representative Ogden L. Mills. While with Treasury, Winston took part in the settlement of the international war debts arising from World War I and acted as Secretary of the American Debt Funding Commission. After leaving Treasury, he joined the Shearman & Sterling law firm and remained there until his death in 1955. In 1945, he became a director of Eversharp Inc.

== Personal life ==
In 1911, he lived at 1508 North State Street in Chicago and was a member of the South Shore Country Club, the Saddle and Cycle Club, the Mid-Day Club and was an avid yachting enthusiast. From 1925 to 1927, he was treasurer of the American Red Cross and was president of the New York Trade School and a vice president and director of the Miriam Osborn Memorial Home Association.

Winston, who never married, died on July 28, 1955, at Roosevelt Hospital in New York City. At the time of his death, he was living at 7 East 92nd Street in Manhattan. In his will, from a gross estate of $14,889,088, Winston left $3,702,706 to Roosevelt Hospital and other $3,702,706 to his sister Marcia, the remainder of which was to go to the Hospital upon her death.
