= Frederick Winston =

Frederick Winston may refer to:

- Frederick Hampden Winston (1830–1904), American lawyer and ambassador
- Frederick S. Winston (1806–1885), American businessman
