= Charles Wells Russell Jr. =

American diplomat

Ambassador Charles Wells Russell Jr.
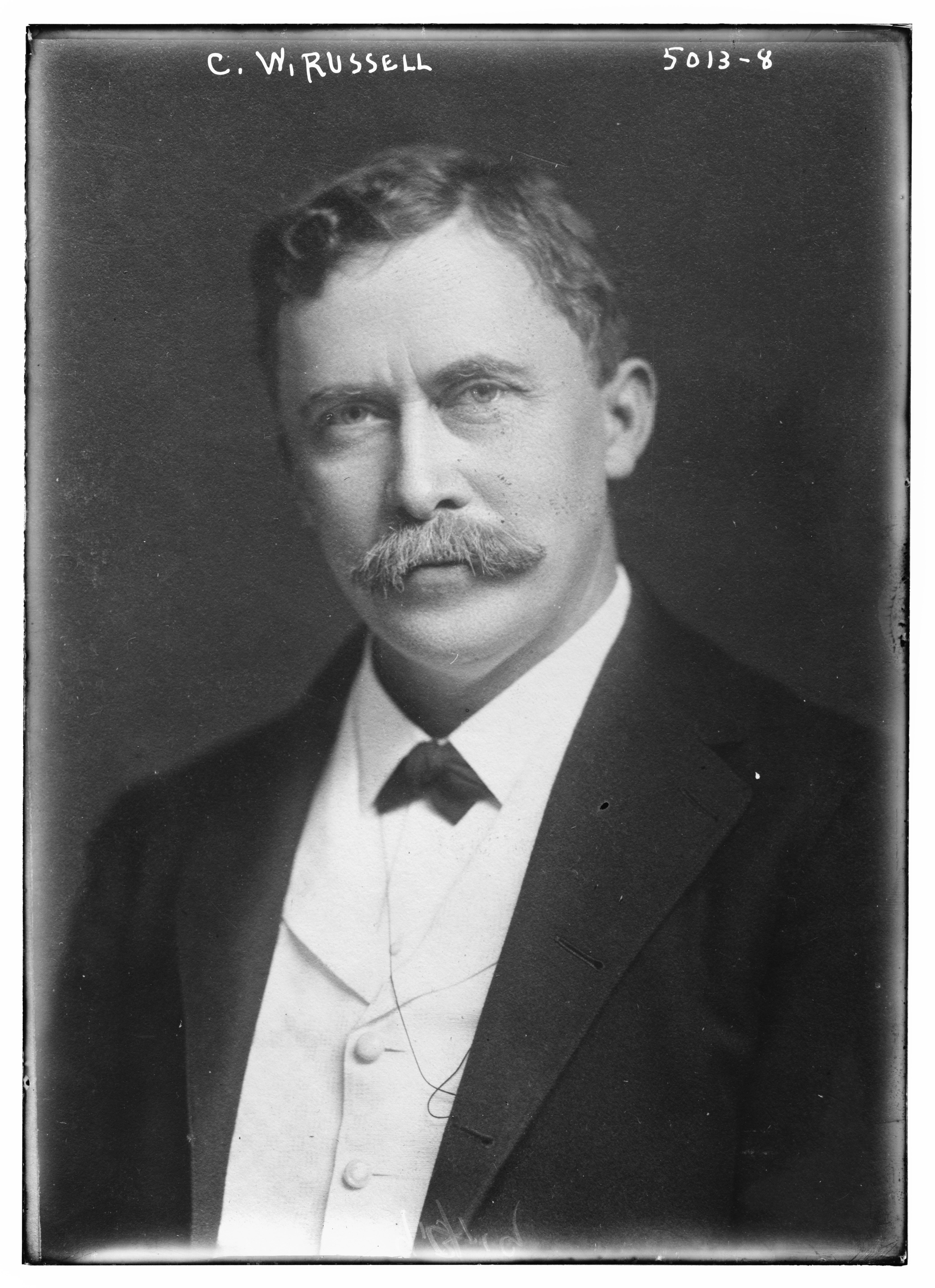

United States Ambassador to Iran
- In office 1909–1914
- Preceded by: John B. Jackson
- Succeeded by: John L. Caldwell

Personal details
- Born: Charles Wells Russell; 1856
- Died: 1927 (aged 70–71)
- Parent: Charles Wells Russell (father)

Charles Wells Russell Jr. (1856 – 1927) was an American diplomat.

== Biography ==
Russell was born in 1856 to prominent politician and lawyer Charles Wells Russell Sr.

Originally, Russell worked as an attorney for the Department of Justice (DOJ). He would also marry both of the sisters of former Confederate Colonel, John S. Mosby and by the late 1800s have children from them both. Russell would use his position in the DOJ to hire his brother-in-law as a subordinate in the Bureau of Insular and Territorial affairs.

Russell served as the United States' Envoy Extraordinary and Minister Plenipotentiary to Iran from 1909 to 1914.

In 1917 Russell would be listed as the editor on his brother-in-law's memoirs.

Russell died in 1927.
