= Truxtun Beale =

American diplomat

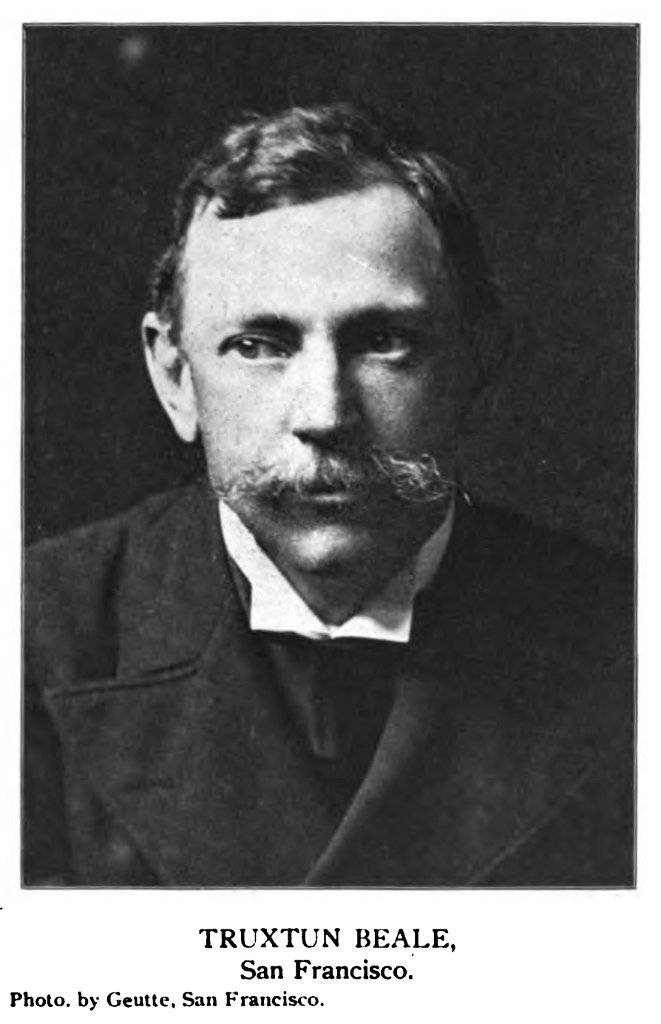
- Beale in 1902
- Born: March 6, 1856; San Francisco, California
- Died: June 2, 1936 (aged 80); Annapolis, Maryland
- Resting place: Bruton Parish Church
- Education: Pennsylvania Military College; Columbia University
- Spouses: Harriet Blaine (m. 1894; divorced); Marie Oge (m. 1903)
- Children: 1
- Relatives: James G. Blaine (father-in-law)

Truxtun Beale (March 6, 1856 – June 2, 1936) was an American diplomat.

== Biography ==
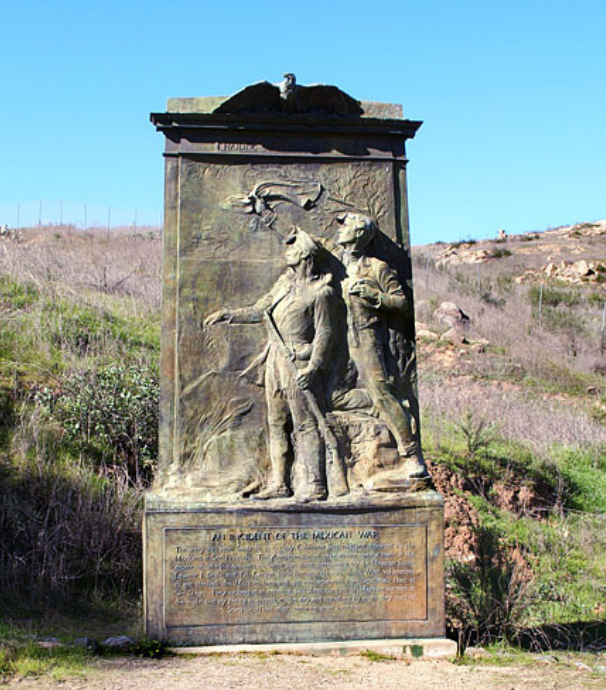
The San Pasqual Battlefield Monument, in San Diego, California, was commissioned by Truxtun Beale in 1910 to commemorate his father's participation in the Battle of San Pasqual, during the U.S. Conquest of California.

Beale was born in San Francisco to Mary Engle Edwards and Edward Fitzgerald Beale; his siblings were Mary (1852–1925), who married Russian diplomat George Bakhmeteff, and Emily (1854–1912), who married John Roll McLean. He was named for his great-grandfather Commodore Thomas Truxtun. His maternal grandfather was U.S. Representative Samuel Edwards. In 1874 he graduated from the Pennsylvania Military College, and four years later, after studying law at Columbia University, was admitted to the bar. From 1876 to 1877 Beale was secretary to his father the US Ambassador to Austria-Hungary in Vienna. Instead of practicing law, he became manager of his father's Tejon Ranch in California, where he remained for 13 years.

In 1891 he was appointed by President Harrison United States Minister to Persia, and a year later, Minister (afterward Envoy Extraordinary and Minister Plenipotentiary) to Greece, Romania, and Serbia, making him ambassador to three countries at once. The years 1894-96 he devoted to travel in Siberia, Central Asia, and Chinese Turkestan. Many articles on international questions were contributed by him to reviews and magazines.

On the death of his father in 1893, Beale inherited the Tejon Ranch. In 1894 he married his first wife, Harriet Blaine of Maine (the daughter of James G. Blaine), and together they had a son, Walker Blaine Beale (March 22, 1896 - September 18, 1918), a Lieutenant in the United States Army who was killed in action in France in World War I.

After divorcing Blaine, Beale returned to California and began a law practice. On the death of his mother in 1903 he inherited Decatur House in Washington, D.C. In the same year, on April 23, he married his second wife, Marie Oge of San Rafael, California in New York City. The marriage took place in New York City in order to avoid what a newspaper called "notoriety due to the shooting last year in San Francisco." The couple initially divided their time between Washington and California but settled permanently at Decatur House following Beale's decision in 1912 to sell Tejon Ranch to a syndicate of investors headed by Harry Chandler and Moses Sherman.

Truxtun Beale spent his last years assembling his father's papers for an official biography and writing about foreign affairs. He died at his country home near Annapolis, Maryland and is buried in Bruton Parish Churchyard, Williamsburg, Virginia.

Diplomatic posts
Preceded by E. Spencer Pratt	United States Minister to Persia; 1891-1892	Succeeded by Watson R. Sperry
Preceded by A. Loudon Snowden	United States Minister to Greece also accredited to Romania and Serbia; 1892-1893	Succeeded by Eben Alexander
