= Cornelius Van Hemert Engert =

United States diplomat

3rd United States Minister to Afghanistan
- In office July 2, 1942 – August 17, 1945
- President: Franklin D. Roosevelt; Harry S. Truman
- Preceded by: Louis G. Dreyfus
- Succeeded by: Ely Palmer

United States Minister to Iran
- Acting
- In office June 1937 – December 17, 1940
- President: Franklin D. Roosevelt
- Preceded by: Gordon Phelps Merriam (acting)
- Succeeded by: Louis G. Dreyfus

3rd United States Minister Resident to Ethiopia
- In office April 30, 1936 – May 6, 1936 (Note: The State Department notes that the mission ended with the Italian occupation of Addis Ababa on May 6, but that Engert left on May 4, 1937.)
- President: Franklin D. Roosevelt
- Preceded by: Addison E. Southard
- Succeeded by: John K. Caldwell

Personal details
- Born: Adolf Cornelius van Hemert Engert; December 31, 1887 Vienna, Austria-Hungary
- Died: May 12, 1985 (aged 97) Washington, D.C., United States
- Cause of death: Pneumonia
- Citizenship: Russian Empire (1887–1910); United States (1910–1985)
- Spouse: Sara Morrison Cunningham (m. 1922; died 1972)
- Education: University of California, Berkeley (Litt.B., Litt.M.); Harvard University
- Occupation: Diplomat

Cornelius Van Hemert Engert (December 31, 1887 – May 12, 1985) was an American diplomat who served in Ethiopia, Iran, and Afghanistan.

== Early life and education ==
Adolf Cornelius van Hemert Engert was born in Vienna, Austria, on New Year's Eve 1887, to a Russian citizen father and a Hungarian Jewish mother. His father, John Cornelius Engert, a trader by profession, was of Dutch origin; he died within a year, leaving his mother, Irma Babetz, to raise him in Austria-Hungary. As his granddaughter, Jane, would later state, however, Engert had a habit of "trying to purge all records and accounts that conflicted with the [...] identity he was trying to create": by sixteen, after attending gymnasium in Zürich, Engert's given name was spelled Adolph. That was the name under which he and his mother, a physician, emigrated to the United States in 1904, on the SS Kaiser Wilhelm II; he would later claim that he had been brought to the United States as a child.

As Engert had attended gymnasium for only three years, he claimed to have attended Ferndale High School in California for one year, 1905, though Ferndale had no graduating class until 1906. Nevertheless, he matriculated into the University of California system, graduating from Berkeley with a Bachelor of Letters in 1908, and his master's (again, in letters) the next year. Though his professor of Slavic languages, George Rapall Noyes, would later describe him as "[t]he best student of those early years [of teaching]" and a "youth of many talents", Jane Engert would describe her grandfather's academic performance as "not at all distinguished", though "decent enough". He then proceeded to study law and teach until 1911, when he took the Le Conte Memorial Fellowship then offered by the university to study for a year at Harvard University, where he befriended A. Lawrence Lowell, the president of Harvard University at the time.

Although he left his heart in California, Engert would modify his background as it suited him throughout his life: to The New York Times and other newspapers, he was of "Dutch parentage"; to others, he presented himself as having German relatives, or English and Dutch parentage. Indeed, though it was preserved in federal records, including his naturalization papers in 1910, by the time of his entry into graduate school, Engert had dropped his misspelled first name.

All the same, in 1912, when Engert began his service in the American diplomatic corps, he declared his state of residence to be California and his name to be "Adolph Cornelius". Only in 1924 was he finally able to remove his first name from State Department records. (Note: Evidence of this change can be seen in comparing the 1916 Register of the Department of State (where he is strangely called "Adolphus") with the 1924 Register, which indeed lacks his given name.)

== Early career ==
In March 1912, Engert began his career as a student interpreter in Istanbul; after becoming a full-fledged interpreter, he would become vice consul there two years later.

As Engert himself would later note: he had a "Foreign Service career that went from one calamity to another—and was always exciting."

Indeed, he would have the misfortune of serving as vice-consul during World War I, during which he witnessed the sinking of the Mesudiye by a British submarine. He later struck up an acquaintance with the British sailor commanding the submarine during the attack, Norman Douglas Holbrook.

After the collapse of the Ottoman Empire, Engert returned to the newly established state of Turkey, where he continued to serve in the consulate in Istanbul as vice-consul; he later became consul.

== Interwar years ==
In the early 1920s, Engert briefly served in Iran as acting U.S. minister; as he was proceeding to his post, he happened to witness the Iraqi revolt of 1920 against Arnold Wilson.

During his time in Iran, before and after the 1921 Persian coup d'état, he catalogued the rise of Reza Shah.

In 1922, upon leaving his Persian post, Engert became the first U.S. diplomat to travel through Afghanistan, ostensibly to search for business opportunities through oil drilling. He also successfully convinced Amanullah Khan to allow Lowell Thomas and David Wooster King through as well. Thomas would later write Beyond Khyber Pass from this experience, and Engert a report for the State Department; Thomas's book was a popular success, as was Engert's report (though in different circumstances). The former would be forgotten; the latter used even into the twentieth century by Harry S. Truman.

Engert later served at The Hague, in Peking, and in Latin America.

== Ethiopia ==
In the summer of 1935, Engert was assigned to Addis Ababa, to serve as the United States chargé d'affaires there; he was received by Emperor Haile Selassie in August.

The Second Italo-Ethiopian War began in October, and, during the war, Engert attempted to protect Foreign Service personnel with bomb shelters and communications systems. As the war raged in Ethiopia, Engert was promoted to minister resident in late January 1936; the U. S. Senate confirmed his promotion a few days later.

The conclusion of the Second Italo-Ethiopian War began in May 1936, with the Italian capture of Addis Ababa. Despite Engert's attempts to protect American personnel, the intervening days between the flight of the Emperor on May 2, the immediate collapse of civil order, and the Italian march toward Addis Ababa left his charges vulnerable: Engert, his wife, and the rest of the legation staff, along with Greek civilians and American journalists, came under attack from Ethiopian bandits in the attack on the United States embassy in Addis Ababa. For several tense days, beginning on May 2, the American legation was repeatedly assaulted with gunfire, while looting and disorder spread throughout the city. The diplomatic staff managed to harm at least one attacker, but the attacks only abated with the Italian occupation of the capital on May 5, 1936. A few days later, President Roosevelt promoted Engert for his heroism.

Even though he now lived in an occupied city, through the early half of 1937, Engert remained at his post, sheltering refugees during the events of Yekatit 12, where the Italian occupiers massacred thousands of Addis Ababa residents; he also attempted to restrain them on multiple occasions.

In March 1937, Engert finally left Ethiopia; his post was terminated a few weeks later.

== Iran ==
Engert returned to Iran in June 1937, this time as chargé d'affaires (in the modern sense).

This time, his job was to help restore diplomatic relations, which had been severed the year before over issues regarding newspaper coverage and a speeding incident. Engert was ultimately successful in this duty.

He was also able to document Iran's relations with the Axis powers and the Allies at the beginning of World War II. Additionally, Engert offered his opinion on the waning years of Reza Shah's regime: repressive and stifling in its lack of political debate, floundering in its meager attempts at a census, yet courageous in introducing mandatory unveiling of women. As the war continued, Engert also noted the impact of German victories early on, the closeness of the Shah to the Germans, the Russian pressure on the government of Iran, and Iranian steps to shake free from British influence.

His mission complete, Engert was replaced with Louis G. Dreyfus in December 1940.

== Afghanistan ==
In 1941, while serving in Beirut, Engert witnessed the Syria–Lebanon campaign, as Vichy France requested that he mediate ceasefire negotiations which were promptly rejected by the British; ultimately, the Allies emerged victorious in the region.

In May 1942, though still in Beirut, Engert was nominated as the United States Minister to Afghanistan; he took up his post later that year.

During his time in Afghanistan, Engert was instrumental in the opening of the Afghan economy to the world, and created opportunities for economic development, which, in the words of Leon B. Poullada, were later "wasted through ignorance, apathy, and bumbling diplomacy".

After returning to the United States, Engert retired from the State Department at the end of the year; as the Foreign Service Journal noted, he retired effective January 1, 1946.

== Later work ==
Immediately after his retirement, Engert joined the United Nations Relief and Rehabilitation Administration as a diplomat, heading a mission to Turkey in March 1946.

Engert was a founding member of American Friends of the Middle East in 1951, serving as secretary-treasurer.

Later, he joined the World Bank and also lectured at various universities.

== Personal life ==
After a courtship of more than two years, Engert married Sara Morrison Cunningham on December 16, 1922, at St. Luke's Church in San Francisco. Cunningham was a socialite, amateur bookbinder (and life member of the Guild of Book Workers), and former nurse during World War I, for which she had received the Medal of French Gratitude. Sara would join her husband at his posts, most famously at Addis Ababa, for which she was later nominated for a Congressional Medal of Honor by Edith Nourse Rogers for her actions during the embassy attack. Ultimately, Sara predeceased Cornelius on July 14, 1972, while on vacation in Brussels.

The couple had two children, Roderick (1925–2018), a military historian with the United States Army; and Sheila. Roderick's daughter, Jane, would go on to write a biography about her grandfather.

== Later life ==
In January 1981, at the age of 93, Engert reminisced about his State Department years with colleagues, all the while claiming he was 95, to a reporter of The Washington Post.

Cornelius van Hemert Engert died on May 12, 1985, at his son's home.

His papers are located at the Lauinger Library, a part of the Georgetown University Library.
