= Charles Wells Russell =

American politician

Member of the Virginia House of Delegates from the Ohio County district
- In office December 2, 1850 – December 3, 1853
- Preceded by: James Sanders Wheat
- Succeeded by: Thomas M. Gally

Member of the Provisional Confederate House of Representatives from Virginia
- In office July 1861 – February 1862

Member of the Confederate House of Representatives from Virginia
- In office February 1862 – March 1865

Personal details
- Born: July 22, 1818 Tyler County, Virginia, US
- Died: November 22, 1867 (aged 61) Baltimore, Maryland, US
- Resting place: Woodlawn Cemetery, Baltimore, Maryland
- Party: Democratic
- Spouse: Margaret M. Russell
- Education: Staunton Academy
- Alma mater: University of Virginia
- Profession: Politician, lawyer

Charles Wells Russell (July 22, 1818 – November 22, 1867) was a Virginia lawyer and politician. He supported the Confederate States of America during the American Civil War, serving as one of Virginia's delegates to the Provisional Confederate Congress and then the First and Second Confederate Congresses, although his home area seceded from the Commonwealth and became West Virginia during that war.

== Early and family life ==
Born in Tyler County, Virginia (now Tyler County, West Virginia), which his grandfather helped found. He was educated at the Linsly Institute and then went to Canonsburg, Pennsylvania, graduating from Jefferson College. He read law under Z. Jacob in Wheeling and passed his bar exam.

Charles married Margaret Wilson Moore in 1842; and in 1850 they lived with iron manufacturer Henry Moore in Wheeling (Third Ward). They had two (perhaps three?, Edward Oldham Russell) sons, Henry Moore Russell (1851-1915) and Charles Wells Russell Jr. (1856-1927) (U.S. diplomat, 1909–1914).

== Career ==
Russell became a prominent lawyer in Wheeling, which was then Virginia's second largest city. With U.S. Attorney General Reverdy Johnson (who was acting in a private capacity) and other Virginia lawyers including James Paull and Alexander H. H. Stuart, Russell defended the Wheeling and Belmont Bridge Company in litigation brought by Edwin M. Stanton and Robert J. Walker following construction of the Wheeling Suspension Bridge across the Ohio River beginning in 1849. Although the company twice technically lost in the United States Supreme Court in the lawsuit brought by upriver rivals in Pittsburgh, Pennsylvania, Russell's legislative advocacy also proved crucial. The longest single span wire suspension bridge to cross a major Western river (and the longest in the world at the time) was never demolished, and was even rebuilt after damage in a May 1854 windstorm (probable tornado).

In 1850, Ohio County voters elected Russell to the Virginia House of Delegates. He was at first their only delegate (a part-time position) but after The Virginia Constitution of 1851 increased representation for western counties, he served alongside Chester D. Hubbard and John M. Oldham. However, in 1853, Ohio County voters instead elected John C. Campbell and Thomas M. Gally (who would in turn be ousted by James Paull, John Brady and T.L. Crammer).

Russell was an elector in the 1860 presidential election supporting Democratic candidate John C. Breckinridge. After Virginia's secession in mid-1861, West Virginia voters who refused to remain loyal to the Union (generally volunteers in Confederate camps) elected Russell to the Provisional Confederate Congress where he served from July 1861 until February 1862), and then to the First Confederate Congress and the Second Confederate Congress, where he served from February 1862 until March 1865. His former co-counsel James Paull and co-delegate Chester D. Hubbard remained loyal to the Union and helped found West Virginia.

== Death and legacy ==
Russell died on November 22, 1867.

His son Charles Wells Russell became a U.S. Assistant Attorney General and U.S. Minister to Persia.
