= Washington (1837 ship) =

US revenue cutter ship (1837–1861)

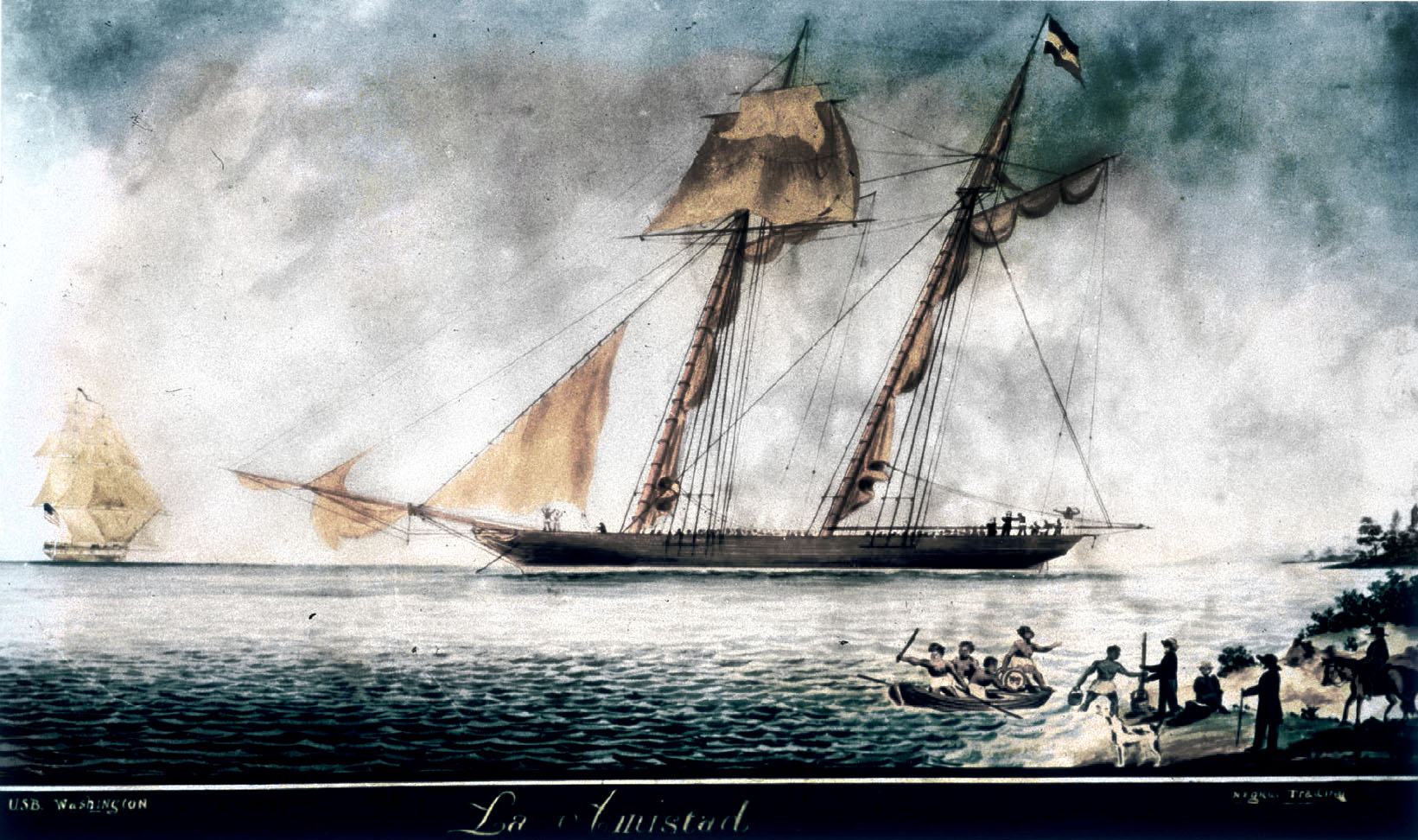
- USS Washington at left and La Amistad

History

United States
- Name: Washington
- Namesake: Peter G. Washington
- Ordered: 6 July 1837
- Christened: 1 August 1837
- Completed: 1837.
- Commissioned: before November 1837
- Decommissioned: after June 1861
- Fate: Seized by Confederate States of America 1861; Scuttled 25 April 1862

General characteristics
- Displacement: 190 tons
- Length: 91 ft 2 in (27.79 m)
- Beam: 21 ft 2 in (6.45 m)
- Propulsion: Sail.
- Sail plan: Topsail schooner; re-rigged as a brig in 1838
- Armament: 10 guns (pre-1860); 1 × 42-pound pivot (1860)

Washington was a revenue cutter that served in the United States Revenue-Marine and in the United States Navy. She discovered, boarded, and captured La Amistad after the slaves on board had seized control of that schooner in an 1839 mutiny.

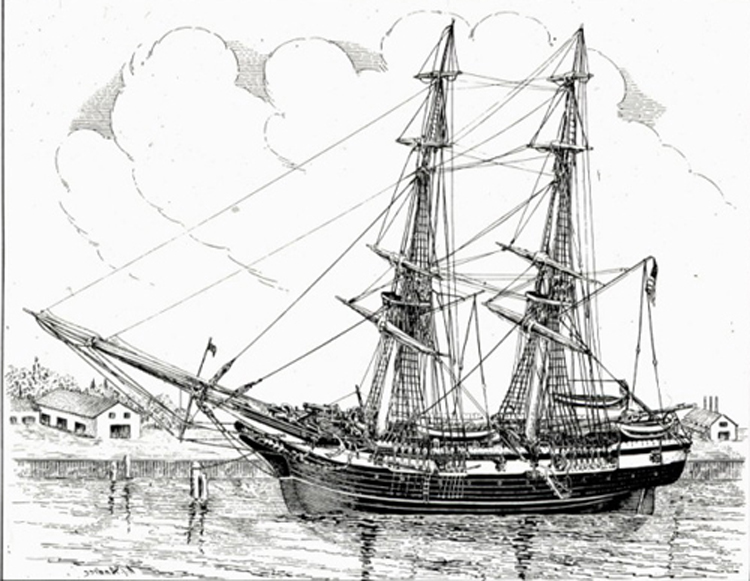
USS Washington (1837)

Washington was the second cutter of that name to serve in the U.S. Navy and was named after Peter G. Washington, who had served as a clerk in the United States Department of the Treasury, as chief clerk to the 6th Auditor, as First Assistant Postmaster General of the United States, and as Assistant Secretary of the Treasury.

== Service history ==
Authorized on 6 July 1837 and named on 1 August 1837, Washington was built for the U.S. Revenue-Marine under the supervision of Captain H. D. Hunter, U.S. Revenue-Marine. She apparently was built quickly, as orders were issued on 11 November 1837 for the ship to conduct "winter cruising" off the United States East Coast between New York City and the Virginia Capes. She sailed on 18 December 1837 on her first cruise. In ensuing years, she cruised that stretch of sea in the winters and conducted depth sounding and surveying operations off the coast in the summers of 1838 and 1839 in support of the United States Coast Survey. Constructed as a schooner, she was rerigged as a brig during that period, apparently at Baltimore, Maryland.

While sounding for the U.S. Coast Survey between Gardiner's Point and Montauk Point off Long Island, New York, on 26 August 1839, Washington sighted a "suspicious-looking vessel" at anchor. Her commanding officer, Lieutenant Thomas R. Gedney, USN, sent an armed party to board the craft. The men found the suspicious ship to be the schooner La Amistad, of and from Havana, Cuba. She had set sail from the coast of Africa two months or so before, carrying two white passengers and 54 slaves, bound for Guanaja, Cuba. Four days out of port, the slaves rose and killed the captain and his crew, saving the two passengers to navigate the ship back to Africa. During the next two months, in which La Amistad had drifted at sea, nine of the slaves had died.

Washington was transferred to the United States Coast Survey (later renamed the United States Coast and Geodetic Survey, one of the ancestors of today's National Oceanic and Atmospheric Administration), on 23 April 1840. For the next 12 years, she operated under the aegis of the U.S. Navy off the U.S. East Coast on surveying and sounding duties. While stationed in the Chesapeake Bay in 1846, she was dismasted in a severe gale. Battered and worn but still afloat, she limped into port. She had lost 11 men overboard in the storm, including her commanding officer, Lieutenant George M. Bache.

When the Mexican–American War began in 1846, Washington served with Commodore Matthew C. Perry's forces. Under the command of Lieutenant Commander Samuel Phillips Lee, Washington took part in the Second Battle of Tabasco on 16 June 1847 and contributed six officers and 30 men to a force under the command of Captain S. L. Breese that formed part of the 1,173-man landing force that attacked and captured the Mexican stronghold at Tuxpan.

Returned to the Treasury Department on 18 May 1852, Washington underwent extensive repairs at New York which lasted into the early winter. Alterations were completed on 9 December 1852. Washington remained in the New York area, where she operated locally for the next six years. In the second week of January 1854, Washington, and five other revenue cutters sailed almost simultaneously from their home ports, ranging from New London, Connecticut, to Wilmington, Delaware, and from Norfolk, Virginia, to New York City, in a search for the foundering steamer SS San Francisco. Unfortunately, none of the ships found San Francisco.

Ordered to the Gulf of Mexico in the spring of 1859 to relieve the revenue cutter USRC Robert McClelland, Washington apparently arrived at Southwest Pass, Louisiana, soon afterwards. She apparently remained there into 1861. She was slated to be relieved, in turn, by Robert McClelland, but the outbreak of the American Civil War in April 1861 caught Washington at New Orleans, Louisiana, where she was taken over by Louisiana authorities soon after that state seceded from the Union on 31 January 1861 to join the Confederate States of America. Little is known of the ship thereafter. In June 1861, U.S. Navy Commodore David Dixon Porter reported that she was being fitted out at New Orleans and was almost ready for sea.

On 25 April 1862, Confederate forces scuttled Washington at the docks in New Orleans to prevent her capture by the U.S. Navy squadron of Flag Officer David Glasgow Farragut, which arrived at New Orleans that day.

== See also ==
- Union Navy
- Union Blockade
- United States Revenue Cutter Service
- United States Coast Guard
- List of United States Navy ships
