= Impact of the Korean War on the economy of the United States =

The impact of the Korean War on the economy of the United States refers to the ways in which the American economy was affected by the Korean experience from 1950 to 1953. The Korean War boosted GDP growth through government spending, which in turn constrained investment and consumption. While taxes were raised significantly to finance the war, the Federal Reserve followed an anti-inflationary policy. Though there was a large increase in prices at the outset of the war, price and wage controls ultimately stabilized prices by the end of the war. Consumption and investment continued to grow after the war, but below the trend rate prior to the war.

== Financing ==
While the United States historically financed wars using a combination of direct contemporaneous taxes, debt, and money creation, with taxation comprising a relatively small fraction of expenses, the Korean War was financed mainly via taxation. This focus on taxation was significant change in economic policy, as President Harry S. Truman focused on maintaining a balanced budget. He favored pay-as-you-go taxation and Congress supported this; in 1950, the House of Representatives, in an overwhelming majority, voted 328 to 7 to raise personal income taxes, corporate income taxes, and excise taxes. Also, capital taxation reached their highest levels in the history of the U.S. during the Korean War, rising to an average of about 62%. Sin and luxury taxes, such as those on furs, jewelry, and coin-operated gambling machines were increased as well and new taxes on television and household freezers, which represented goods that used materials and manufacturing facilities that were maybe important for the war effort. Taxes were again increased under the Revenue Act of 1951. Although the Revenue Acts during the Korean War were unable to prevent a deficit in the federal budget, the deficits produced were manageable, averaging about 6.5 percent of revenues on a monthly basis during the war. Through such measures, President Truman depended mostly on taxation and a decrease in non-military expenses, rather than from borrowing from the public or money creation policies.

== Monetary policy ==
Monetary policy during the Korean War, centered around the issue of whether or not the Federal Reserve should continue its prewar policy of setting a floor under the prices of government bonds or whether it should allow prices to drop, in order to restrict money and credit growth to restrict inflation. Truman and his Treasury Secretary, John W. Snyder strongly were in favor of the former strategy of pegging government bond prices, but the Federal Reserve saw the need to encourage macroeconomic stability, meaning fighting inflation. At the outbreak of the war, prices surged; by February 1951, the monthly increase in the consumer price index was almost 20 percent annually. Ultimately, the Federal Reserve followed an anti-inflationary policy.

The first nine months of war are characterized by expansion and strong inflationary pressure due to abnormally large consumption in anticipation of possible future shortages. The outbreak of the Korean War led to a sharp increase in consumer expenditure, as consumers hurried to buy automobile tires, sugar, nylons, etc. and in response to all the consumer purchases and in anticipation of war orders, manufacturers also began buying more raw materials. The spurt in sales lasted two months and then declined for several months as United Nations forces advanced northward in Korea. This was until there was a second buying wave in the winter of 1951, which followed the Chinese attacks along the Yalu River and United Nations forces retreated.

== Price freeze ==
On January 26, 1951, a price freeze was introduced. From the onset of the war to the start of the price freeze, prices increased at a rate of 11.1 percent annually. During the period from the price freeze to the end of price controls, prices rose at rate of 2.1 percent annually. Overall inflation increased by 5.3 percent. This inflation growth was much lower than that of World War II, during which wholesale prices increased about 70 percent. While money growth was very high and volatile during World War II, averaging 18 percent between 1940 and 1946, the average money growth rate during the Korean War was 4 percent. In response to this growth in inflation, the government implemented price and wage controls. Increases in taxes and new price and wage controls that constrained private sector consumption and investment affected overall material well-being. In the years after the war, consumption and investment continue to be impacted by war as they did not return to pre-war levels.

== Military spending ==
Military spending in the United States was high prior to the Korean War due to the Cold War with the Soviet Union. The Korean War cost the US$30 billion in 1953, which is equivalent to US$341 billion in 2011. During the last year of the war, annual war expenditure comprised about 14.1 percent of GDP. Approximately 34,000 Americans were killed in battle and about another 2,800 died from disease or injury, with total U.S. casualties, which includes dead, wounded, and missing in action, adding up to 139,860. The "Korean War GI Bill" was implemented in 1952, eventually covering veterans between June 27, 1950 and February 1, 1955. It offered the same benefits as the World War II G.I. Bill, including mustering-out pay, financial support for education, home and business loan guarantees, unemployment compensation, and job placement.
