= Attack on the United States embassy in Addis Ababa =

1936 attack in Ethiopia

- Part of Second Italo-Ethiopian War
- Date: May 3–5, 1936
- Location: Addis Ababa, Ethiopia
- Caused by: Collapse of Ethiopian government
- Methods: Siege
- Result: Americans evacuated by British Army, legation secured by Royal Italian Army

Parties
United States; Supported by: Italy; United Kingdom; Ethiopian civilians	Ethiopian civilians

Lead figures
Cornelius Van Hemert Engert (Minister Resident of the United States); Sir Sidney Barton (Ambassador of the United Kingdom)	unknown

Number
United States: 12 (7 U.S. Foreign Service, 4 U.S. Navy, 1 civilian dependent); United Kingdom: at least 15 (11th Sikh Regiment); Italy: 53; Ethiopian civilians: unknown	unknown

Casualties and losses
two wounded	unknown

The attack on the United States embassy in Addis Ababa was an assault against the chancery of the embassy of the United States to the Ethiopian Empire by shiftas. It occurred in early May 1936 following the collapse of the Ethiopian government and the departure of Emperor Haile Selassie from the city prior to the Italian conquest of Addis Ababa. The attack forced the temporary abandonment of the compound and the evacuation of its personnel by the British Army.

American diplomatic and consular staff, supported by Italian troops, returned to reoccupy the chancery several days following their evacuation. In the United States, American minister Cornelius Van Hemert Engert was recognized for his actions leading the defense of the chancery, though the administration of Franklin Roosevelt would come under public criticism for not better providing for its protection.

== Background ==
On October 3, 1935, Italy invaded Ethiopia from Italian Somaliland and Eritrea. By April of the following year, Italian forces had reached as far as Dessie. Cornelius Van H. Engert, the United States minister to Ethiopia, had taken up his post in February 1936 but, as of April, had yet been formally accredited by the Ethiopian government. On April 30 he was summoned to the throne room of Menelik Palace to present his credentials to Haile Selassie. Less than two days later, with the Italian Army approaching the city, the emperor and the imperial court evacuated the capital for French Somaliland, a move that was unexpected and resented by many Ethiopians.

== Riots erupt ==
Prior to departing Addis Ababa, Haile Selassie ordered government armories opened with the apparent intent that civilians would seize the weapons and spontaneously resist the Italian entrance into the city. Instead, the weapons free-for-all combined with the collapse of the government sparked widespread civil disorder. By the afternoon of May 2, with the street violence growing increasingly worse, American journalists who had been in the city covering the war – as well as 37 Greek civilians – all sought refuge in the chancery of the embassy. In addition, the files of the Ethiopian foreign ministry were brought to the American chancery by John H. Spencer for safekeeping, along with a personal cache of "food and guns" which he donated to the embassy.

== Attack and evacuation ==
On Monday, May 3, the chancery was attacked by an organized band of shiftas, the attack repelled by embassy staff and local contract guards. However, with the chancery under continuing fire, Engert resolved to contact the embassy of the United Kingdom for assistance, the British being in a more defensible location and better protected. A courier who attempted to make the trek to the British compound had to turn back due to the intensity of street violence. A radio message was, instead, transmitted to the British embassy, however, as the U.S. had no direct contact with the British, it had first to be relayed to the United States Department of State, forwarded to London and then sent back to Addis Ababa, the entire process taking the better part of a day.

At 8:30 a.m. on May 4, three open-topped trucks and a British Army escort from the UK's embassy arrived at the American compound, whereupon the spouses and children of diplomatic staff, and sheltering civilians – including one reporter's pet cheetah – were driven to the British legation a few miles away. Remaining to defend the American legation was Engert, his wife, four U.S. Navy radio operators, six diplomats, several Ethiopian domestic staff, and one Ethiopian police officer who had sought refuge at the facility. Among them, they were armed with nine rifles, two shotguns, ten revolvers, and a submachine gun. Throughout the day, the compound continued to take fire and two of the local domestic staff were shot and seriously wounded. With ammunition running low, the State Department authorized Engert to abandon the legation, however, British forces were unable to provide immediate aid as they were occupied repelling a simultaneous assault upon the Belgian legation. Finally, on the morning of May 5, soldiers of the 11th Sikh Regiment arrived and evacuated the remaining Americans to the British legation. Simultaneously, United States Secretary of State Cordell Hull sent a telegram to Benito Mussolini requesting the Royal Italian Army immediately enter Addis Ababa to stabilize the situation. The same day as the evacuation of the Americans by the British, German troops had to be dispatched by that nation's embassy to rescue Swiss physician Marcel Junod and French journalists who were trapped in a collapsed building.

Later that evening, 25,000 Italian troops entered Addis Ababa. The next morning a contingent of four Americans returned to occupy the chancery, however, soon found themselves again under scattered fire. At the request of the United States, Italian troops were thereafter dispatched to secure the legation and its grounds, with 53 soldiers of the Italian Army reported having arrived at the compound in a later cable to Washington sent by an American vice-consul.

== Aftermath ==
Engert was given a one rank promotion in the U.S. Foreign Service in recognition of his efforts during the attack. Robert Worth Bingham, the United States Ambassador to the United Kingdom, was instructed by Secretary Hull to express "sincere appreciation" to the United Kingdom for its "prompt and efficient assistance".

Some newspapers in the United States commented on the fact it was necessary for the United States embassy to appeal for aid to the United Kingdom and condemned the Roosevelt administration for not providing for a better defense of the American legation.

John Spencer would later report that, when he returned to retrieve the Ethiopian government files he had brought to the American legation for safekeeping, some had gone missing.

The United States terminated its mission in Addis Ababa in the spring of 1937.

== See also ==
- 1975 AIA building hostage crisis
- 2012 Benghazi attack
- Dolo hospital airstrike
