= The Mummy and the Humming Bird =

1915 film by James Durkin

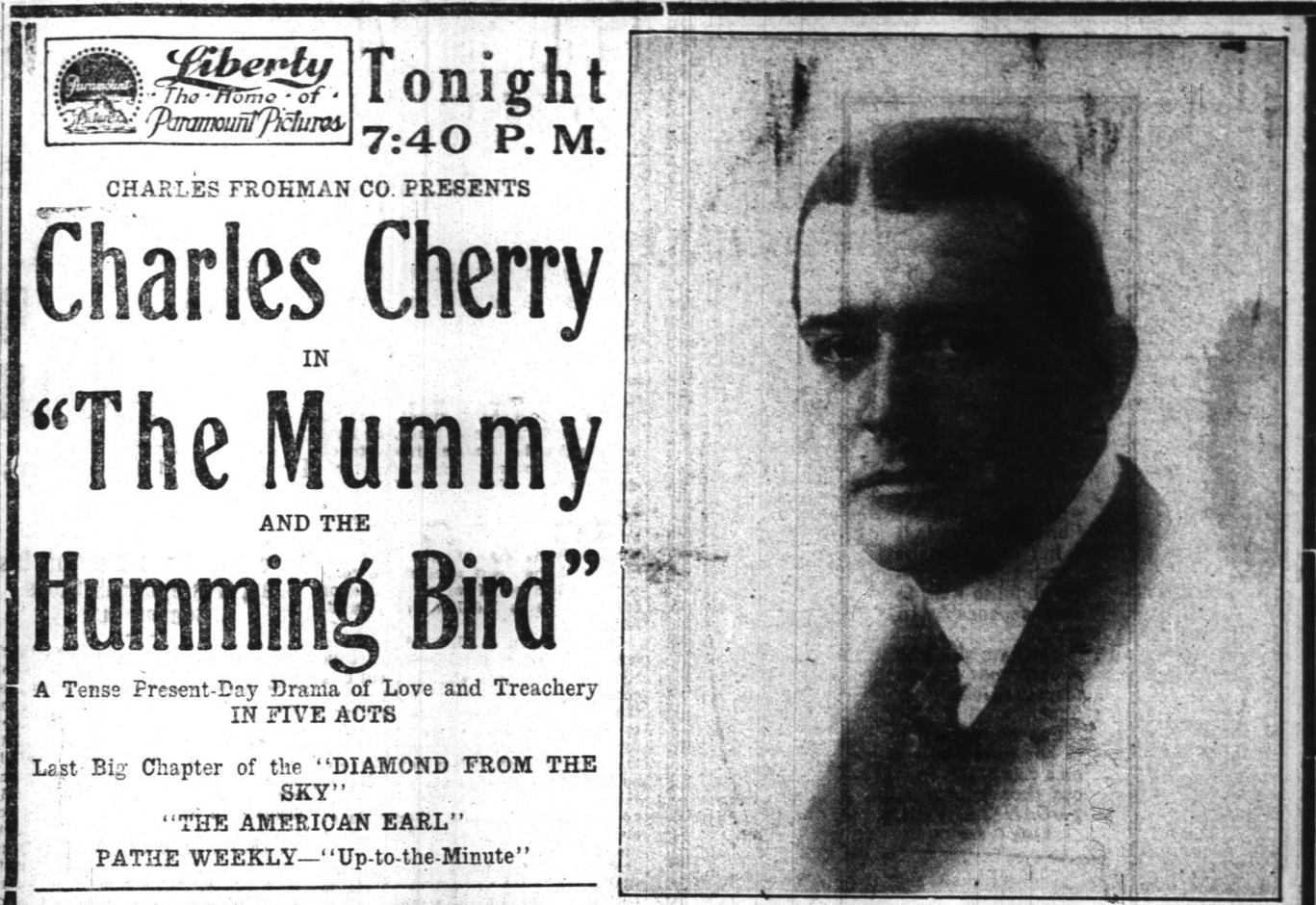
- Newspaper advertisement
- Directed by: James Durkin
- Screenplay by: Isaac Henderson
- Produced by: Charles Frohman
- Starring: Charles Cherry; Lillian Tucker; Arthur Hoops; William Sorelle; Claire Zobelle; Charles Coleman
- Production companies: Charles Frohman Company; Famous Players Film Company
- Distributed by: Paramount Pictures
- Release date: November 11, 1915
- Country: United States
- Language: English

The Mummy and the Humming Bird is a lost 1915 American drama silent film directed by James Durkin and written by Isaac Henderson. The film stars Charles Cherry, Lillian Tucker, Arthur Hoops, William Sorelle, Claire Zobelle and Charles Coleman. The film was released on November 11, 1915, by Paramount Pictures.

== Cast ==
- Charles Cherry as Lord Lumley
- Lillian Tucker as Lady Lumley
- Arthur Hoops as Signor D'Orelli
- William Sorelle as Giuseppe
- Claire Zobelle as Emma
- Charles Coleman as Ronalds
- Nina Lindsey as Ruth
