= Gordon P. Merriam =

American soldier and diplomat

The Honourable Gordon Phelps Merriam

U.S. Ambassador to Iran
- In office 1936–1937
- Preceded by: William H. Hornibrook
- Succeeded by: Cornelius Van Hemert Engert

Personal details
- Born: July 29, 1899 Lexington, Massachusetts
- Died: February 16, 1999 (aged 99) South Bristol, Maine

Military service
- Allegiance: United States
- Rank: Second lieutenant
- Battles/wars: World War I

Gordon Phelps Merriam (July 29, 1899 – February 16, 1999) was an American soldier and diplomat.

== Biography ==
Merriam was born on July 29, 1899, in Lexington, Massachusetts. He would graduate from Noble and Greenough School in 1917.

== World War I ==
Merriam went to France in June 1917, serving in the Norton-Harjes Ambulance Corps for five months. Once he returned to the United States he would get commissioned as a second lieutenant in September 1918, following completion of training in machine guns in the Student Army Training Corps at Camp Hancock, Georgia.

Merriam would get commissioned as the Chargé d'affaires to Iran in March 1936, a position he would hold until May 1937. He would also serve as the chief of the Near Eastern Division of the State Department. During his service in the State Department, he would be an advocate for U.S. investments in Middle Eastern energy infrastructure. He would also keep the United States informed on issues regarding the Kurds, their connections to different groups in the region and movement from Iran into Iraq. He would also criticize the Balfour declaration and instead advocate for the Jews and Arabs to determine the fate of the former mandate together.

Merriam died on February 16, 1999, in South Bristol, Maine. He died following a short illness.
