= John H. Spencer =

American historian

Dr. John H. Spencer (1907 – August 25, 2005) was an American historian.

He attended Grinnell College in Iowa and Harvard College in Massachusetts. In 1935 in Paris he was offered a job to represent and advise the Ethiopian government in the international legal matters, and during the Italian occupation of Ethiopia and the Second Italo-Abyssinian War he served as a legal advisor to Emperor Haile Selassie and accompanied him to the League of Nations on June 30, 1936, to ask for assistance. In October 1937, Spencer travelled to the United States and discussed the legal aspect of the Italy-Ethiopian conflict from 1934 to 1937, which appeared in the American Journal of International Law (Volume 31, 1937). In 1936 he left his position in the Ethiopian government and joined the United States Navy, then the Department of State and the Department of Justice. After the defeat of the Italians in Africa, Spencer rejoined the Ethiopian government and was a principal advisor until 1943.

On December 19, 1944, he successfully negotiated Ethiopia from Britain. Other negotiations and international conference in which Spencer took an active role include: the Paris Peace Conference, where Ethiopia had territorial claims about The Ogaden (the eastern part of Ethiopia which had a proximate with Somalia) and the present-day nation of Eritrea; the San Francisco Conference assembled to establish a United Nations, a prominent forum that deliberated for months and successfully created the new organization to succeed the old League of Nations; and later the negotiations that took place in Washington for the establishment of the Ethiopian Airlines.

Spencer continued to work as Ethiopia's legal advisor until the late 1950s and published his work Ethiopia at Bay: A Personal Account of the Haile Selassie Years. He married in 1949 and had a daughter who survived him.

Ethiopia at Bay: A Personal Account of the Haile Selassie Years

In this memoir, Spencer offers an account of Ethiopia during the Haile Selassie era, drawing on his role as the Emperor's legal advisor. The book provides a narrative of the inner workings of the imperial court and Ethiopia's complex foreign relations. It offers his perspective on the lead up to the Second Italo-Ethiopian War, the country's liberation by British forces, and the federation with Eritrea. His negotiations with both the British and the United Nations helped to secure Ethiopia's territorial integrity, particularly in regaining access to the sea and the Ogaden.

== See also ==
- Attack on the United States embassy in Addis Ababa
