= Isaac Henderson =

American newspaperman and dramatist

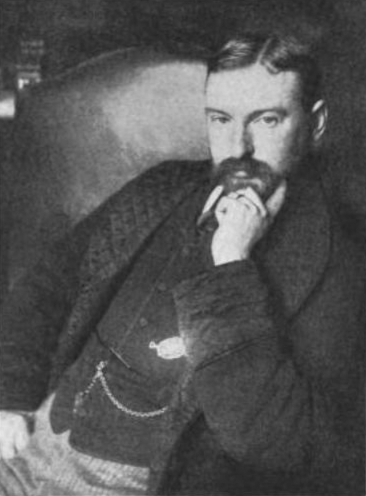
- In The Sketch, October 9, 1901
- Born: Isaac Henderson Jr. February 13, 1850; Brooklyn, New York, US
- Died: March 31, 1909 (aged 59); Rome, Italy
- Other name: Isaac Austin Henderson
- Education: Williams College
- Employer: New York Evening Post

Isaac Henderson Jr. or Isaac Austin Henderson (February 13, 1850 – March 31, 1909) was an American newspaper publisher, novelist, and dramatist. He was associated with the New York Evening Post for ten years.

== Early life ==
Henderson was born in Brooklyn in 1850. He was the son of Margaret (née Johnston) and Isaac Henderson (1814–1884), co-owner of the New York Evening Post with William Cullen Bryant and John Bigelow. His father's career at the Post ended in 1878 when an investigation revealed he had defrauded Bryant for thirty years. During Abraham Lincoln's presidency in 1861, his father was appointed Navy Agent, "thereby becoming both a civilian employee of the Navy Department and a disbursing officer of the government subject to Treasury Department supervision." In 1864, his father was arrested and tried for issuing false vouchers when he was Navy Agent. After a well-publicized trial, he was found not guilty on technical grounds.

Henderson's early education was at a Quaker academy in Rhode Island and under tutors. He attended Williams College, graduating with a bachelor's degree, Master of Arts, and Doctor of Civil Law. While there, he was a member of the Fraternity of Delta Psi (St. Anthony Hall).

== Career ==
=== Newspaperman ===
In 1872, Henderson started working for the New York Evening Post, becoming assistant publisher in 1875. In 1877, he was a publisher, stockholder, and member of the board of trustees. Henderson sold his interest in the Evening Post in 1881. In January 1882, Henderson and former post employee Watson R. Sperry started a morning newspaper in Wilmington, Delaware called the Morning Herald. Sperry had married Henderson's sister.

=== Novelist and dramatist ===
In 1886, Henderson published his first novel, The Prelate which was successful story about American ex-patriates in Rome. Its cover was designed by Elihu Vedder. The Brooklyn Union called it "an uncommonly clever book." The Boston Traveler raved, "One of the most brilliant and fascinating romances that has been published in many a day."

In 1888, he published another novel set in Italy, Agatha Page: A Parable. Its cover was a painting by English artist Felix Moscheles, who was inspired to create a painting after hearing Henderson's summary of the novel in progress. The Boston Gazette noted, "The book is admirably written, and its heroine, an exceptionally attractive character, is drawn with great skill and force." The Chicago Times wrote, "She is a creature of such perfect individuality, such strength of character and beauty of soul, that her creation must attain importance in American fiction." By 1889, Agatha Page was in its fifth edition.

In 1892, Sir Charles Wyndham produced Agatha Page as the play The Silent Battle at the Criterion Theatre in London, England. The Boston Museum also dramatized the named as Agatha in 1892.

His next drama was The Mummy and the Humming Bird which was presented at Wyndham's Theatre in 1901. In 1902, the play was performed at the Empire Theatre in New York City. On November 11, 1915, the silent film version of The Mummy and the Humming Bird was released by Famous Players Film Company/Charles Frohman Co., with distribution by Paramount Pictures Corp.

Despite his successful books and plays, Henderson was not a prolific author. The Washington Herald noted, "If he had been a poor man, Mr. Henderson would doubtless have been a prolific writer, but his modest fortune was abundant for his needs, and he wrote but little."

== Publications ==
- Agatha Page: A Parable. Boston: Ticknor and Company, 1888.
- The Prelate: A Novel. Boston: Ticknor and Company, 1886.
- The Mummy and the Humming Bird. New York: Z and L. Rosenfield, 1902
- Out Yonder: A Play in Four Acts, 1909.

== Personal life ==
Henderson married Marion Temple Brown on February 13, 1880, at the Madison Square Presbyterian Church. She was the daughter of Walter Brown of New York City. Like Henderson, she was musically inclined. They were the parents of two daughters, including Ruth Henderson (d. 1933), who married Hon. Walter Patrick Lindsay (1873–1936), third son of James Lindsay, 26th Earl of Crawford.

in 1881, he went to Europe and lived in London. By 1882, he moved to Rome, Italy where he spent his time writing and studying music. In 1888, he had moved back to London, living South Kensington in an exclusive neighborhood, The Boltons.

In 1895, Marion became a Roman Catholic at the hands of Pope Leo XIII. In 1896, Henderson converted to Catholicism, taking the name of Austin at his Confirmation. In 1903 he held the post of honor, private chamberlain to Pope Pius X.

He was a member of the Mendelssohn Glee Club, Union League Club, and the University Club of New York. He promoted The New York Evening Post's Fresh Air Fund for Children. He also donated a playroom and playground for the children of the Trastevere quarter in Rome.

Henderson died in Rome on March 31, 1909.
