= E. Spencer Pratt =

American diplomat

5th United States Ambassador to Iran
- In office 1886–1891
- Appointed by: Grover Cleveland
- Preceded by: Frederick H. Winston
- Succeeded by: Truxtun Beale

Personal details
- Born: Edward Spencer Pratt; March 22, 1856 Mobile, Alabama, U.S.
- Died: April 30, 1925 (aged 69)
- Education: Columbia University
- Profession: Diplomat

Edward Spencer Pratt (March 22, 1856 – April 30, 1925) was an American diplomat. He was born several miles outside of Mobile, Alabama, the son of William Henry Pratt. He was educated in Europe and received a doctorate in medicine. He graduated from Columbia University in 1876. He served as Minister Resident and Consul General to Persia from 1886 to 1891. He served as Consul General to Singapore from 1893 to 1899.
