= Charles Cherry =

British actor

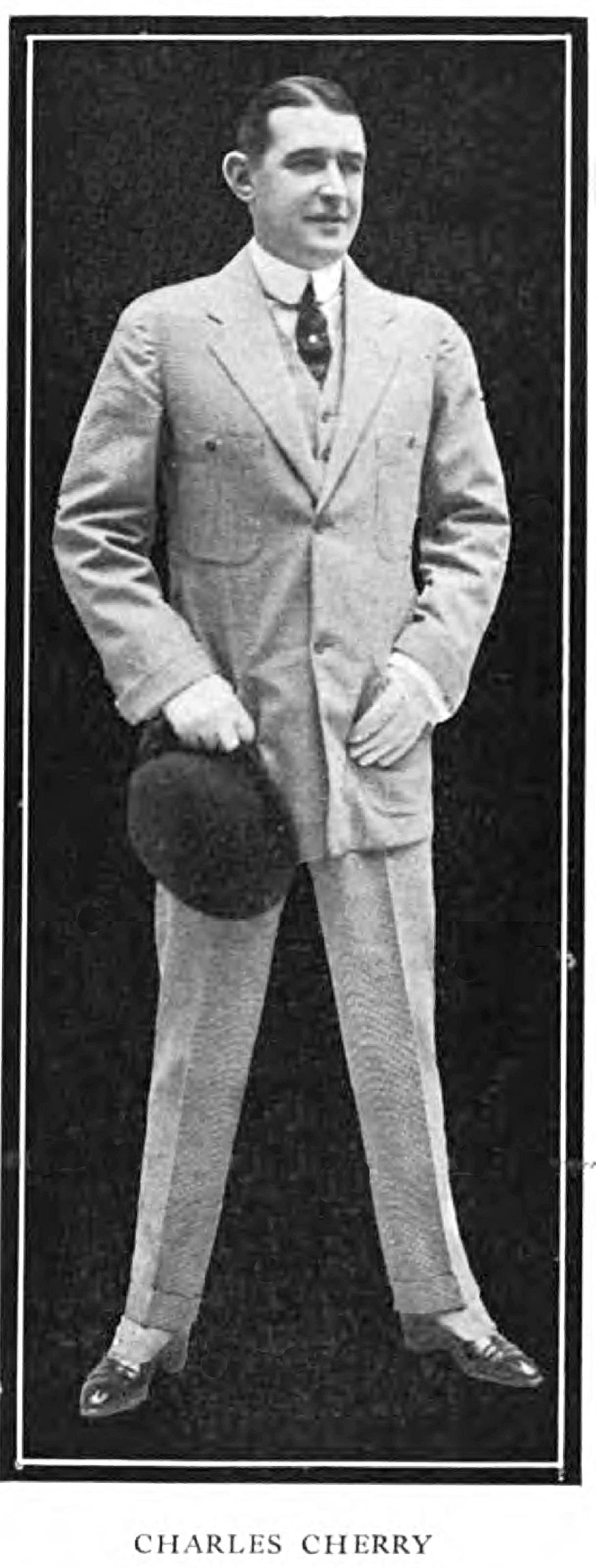
- Born: 19 November 1872; Greenwich, England
- Died: 2 September 1931 (aged 58) ? England
- Occupation: Actor
- Years active: 1892-1924
- Spouse: Grace Dudley

Charles Cameron Cherry (19 November 1872 – 2 September 1931) was a British born actor. He was born to James Frederick Cherry (died 1883) and his wife, Lady Emily Louisa Haworth-Leslie (died 1936) at Greenwich, Kent, England. His mother was a relation to Norman Leslie, 19th Earl of Rothes. He spent a large part of his career in the United States often as leading man to many beautiful star actresses i.e. Elsie de Wolfe, Maxine Elliott, Ethel Barrymore, Marie Doro and Elsie Ferguson.

He appeared in two silent motion pictures, The Mummy and the Hummingbird (1915) and Passers By (1916).

His sisters were Miriam Audrey Cherry (died 1954) (Mrs. Herbert Owen-Taylor) and Gladys Cherry (1881–1965) (Mrs. George O. S. Pringle), a Titanic survivor. His spouse was Grace Dudley.
