= Watson R. Sperry =

American politician

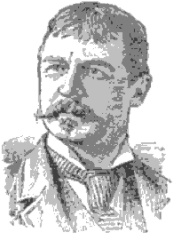
- Born: Watson Robertson Sperry; June 25, 1842; Sauquoit, New York
- Died: February 13, 1926 (aged 83); Hartford, Connecticut
- Education: Williston Academy; Yale College
- Occupations: Editor, diplomat

Watson Robertson Sperry (June 25, 1842 – February 13, 1926) was an American newspaper editor and diplomat.

== Life ==
Sperry was born on June 25, 1842, in Sauquoit, New York, the son of Methodist Episcopal minister Rev. Lyman Sperry and Amanda Keziah Robertson.

When he was 15, Sperry's father put him to work in the printing office in Unadilla. When he was 21, he began editorial writing for the Otsego Republican in Cooperstown and began attending Cooperstown Seminary under Rev. Dr. Kerr. After Kerr's death, he went to Williston Academy in Easthampton, Massachusetts. He entered Yale College and graduated from there in 1871. He won a number of literary prizes, was chairman of the Yale Literary Magazine editorial board, and was a member of Gamma Nu, Delta Beta Xi, Delta Kappa Epsilon, Skull and Bones, and Phi Beta Kappa.

Within a week of his graduation from Yale, Sperry moved to New York City and became a member of the New York Evening Post editorial staff. He served as managing editor from 1875 to 1881. In 1882, he moved to Wilmington, Delaware, purchased a morning newspaper and established the paper as the Morning Herald. The paper was prominent in Delaware. It was a conservative Republican newspaper; it was one of the first newspapers in the northern states to protest the Knights of Labor, which was an influential force in Wilmington at the time.

In 1892, President Benjamin Harrison appointed Sperry American Minister Resident and Consul General to Persia. His time as Minister was short and ended with the changing Presidential administration. He then spent several years traveling and studying in Germany. He returned to America in 1901, at which point he moved to Hartford, Connecticut and worked for the Hartford Courant. In 1909, he left the Courant and returned to Germany for a few years. He then came back to America and served on the editorial staff of the Courant from 1911 to 1912. He then became connected with the Springfield Union until ill health led him to retire from journalism.

In 1874, Sperry married Julia Henderson, daughter of New York Evening Post publisher Isaac Henderson. They had a daughter, Betty, who married Dr. Ritter von Borosini of Germany. Sperry divorced Julia in January 1913, and within a week he married Anna Maria Pletsch Lippold of Dresden, Germany. He was a member of the Century Club.

Sperry died in Hartford from a heart attack on February 13, 1926. He was cremated and his ashes were interred in the Cemetery of St. Mathew's Church in Unadilla.
