= George M. Humphrey =

American politician

George Humphrey
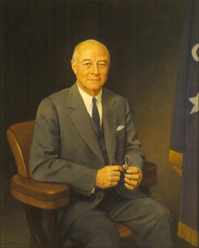

55th United States Secretary of the Treasury
- In office January 21, 1953 – July 29, 1957
- President: Dwight D. Eisenhower
- Preceded by: John Snyder
- Succeeded by: Robert B. Anderson

Personal details
- Born: George Magoffin Humphrey; March 8, 1890 Cheboygan, Michigan, U.S.
- Died: January 20, 1970 (aged 79) Cleveland, Ohio, U.S.
- Resting place: Lake View Cemetery
- Party: Republican
- Spouse: Pamela Stark (m. 1913)
- Children: 3
- Education: University of Michigan, Ann Arbor (BA, LLB)

George Magoffin Humphrey (March 8, 1890 – January 20, 1970) was an American lawyer, businessman and banker. He served as the United States Secretary of the Treasury for President Dwight D. Eisenhower.

== Early life ==
Humphrey was born on March 8, 1890, and raised in Cheboygan, Michigan, the son of Caroline (née Magoffin) Humphrey (1861–1946) and Watts Sherman Humphrey (1844–1916).

Through his brother Watts S. Humphrey, he was the uncle of software engineer Watts Humphrey.

He received both his undergraduate and law degrees from the University of Michigan.

== Career ==
After practicing law in Saginaw, Michigan for five years with his father's firm, he accepted a position as general counsel with steel manufacturer M. A. Hanna Company in 1917. That association lasted 35 years and included his ascension to company president in 1929. He served as Chairman of The Business Council, then known as the Business Advisory Council for the United States Department of Commerce in 1946. Following Dwight Eisenhower's election to the Presidency in 1952, Humphrey was recommended by close adviser General Lucius D. Clay, who had worked with the corporate magnate regarding post-war plans in Germany.

== Secretary of the Treasury ==
As Secretary of the Treasury in the first Republican Administration in 20 years, Humphrey was one of the most influential of President Eisenhower's Cabinet members. Eisenhower was once quoted as saying, "When George speaks, we all listen."

Humphrey had given up a $300,000 salary to accept the Cabinet position that paid just $22,500. He fought to have a balanced budget, tight money, limits on welfare and foreign aid, as well as "trickle down" tax cuts. He was even more adamant about government spending, saying in a 1957 press conference that if it wasn't curbed, "you will have a depression that will curl your hair." Humphrey left office on July 29, 1957. Following Humphrey's departure that same year, he returned to the Hanna Company, serving as honorary board chairman and director, then later became chairman of National Steel Corporation.

=== Later life ===
In 1962, Humphrey became embroiled in a potential controversy when a Senate committee investigated the stockpiling of nickel during his time in the Cabinet. The $98 million deal involved companies he had once headed, but he explained that his motivation was to increase the country's strategic stockpiles and was thus cleared. He made no profit from the deal.

== Personal life ==
On January 15, 1913, Humphrey was married to Pamela Stark of Saginaw. They had three children together:

- Cynthia Pamela Humphrey, who married Royal Firman Jr. They divorced in September 1970.
- Gilbert Watts Humphrey (d. 1979), who became the Chairman of the Hanna conglomerate.
- Caroline Helen Humphrey, who married John G. Butler.

In his later years, Humphrey essentially remained out of the spotlight. His health deteriorated when he suffered an apparent heat stroke in August 1969. He then became a frequent visitor to hospitals until entering Cleveland's University Hospital cardiac unit on December 27, 1969. He died there on January 20, 1970. He was buried at the Lake View Cemetery in Cleveland, Ohio.

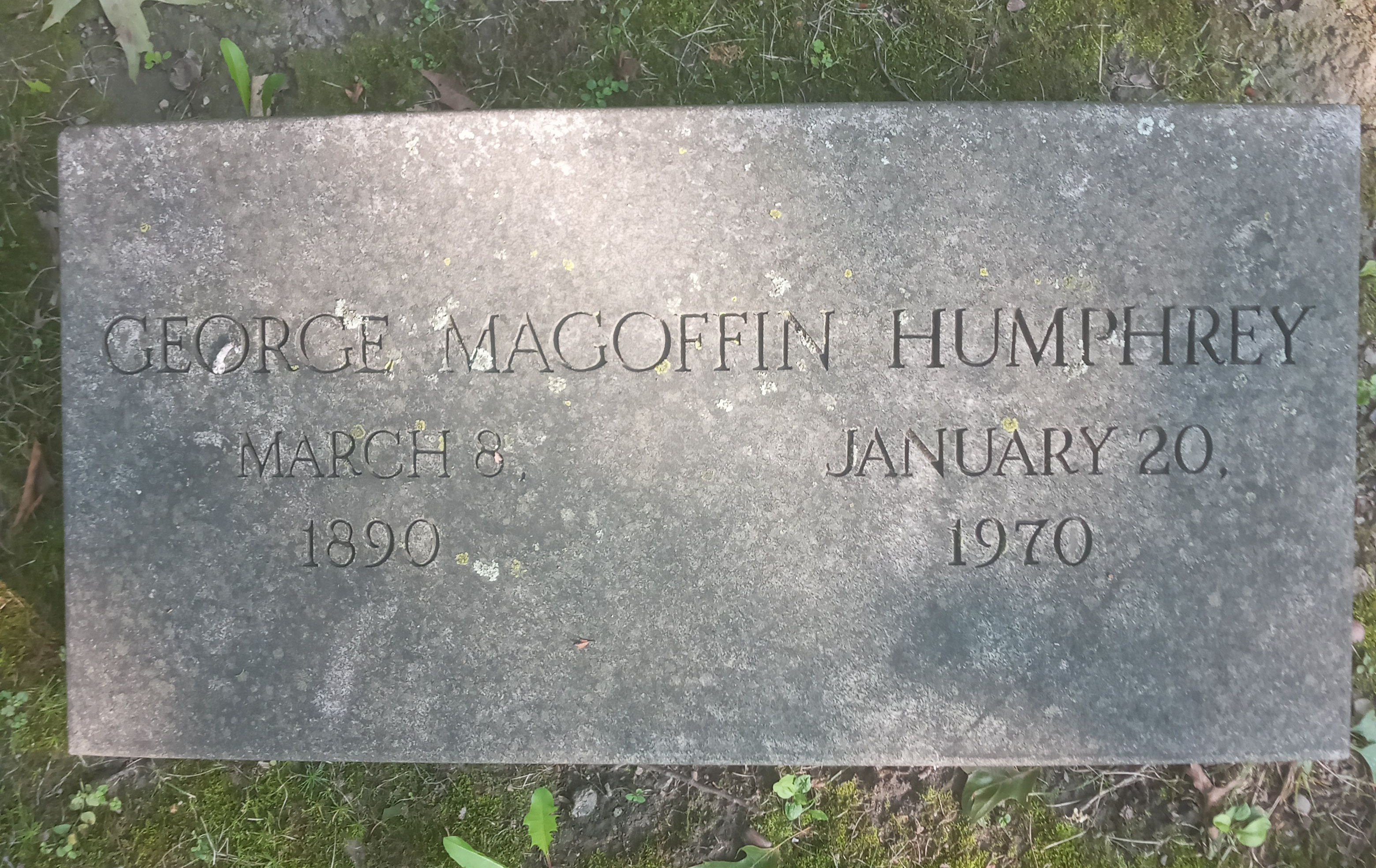
The gravesite of Secretary Humphrey

Political offices
Preceded by John W. Snyder	U.S. Secretary of the Treasury; Served under: Dwight D. Eisenhower; 1953–1957	Succeeded by Robert B. Anderson
