= Elmer Dover =

American politician, businessman, journalist

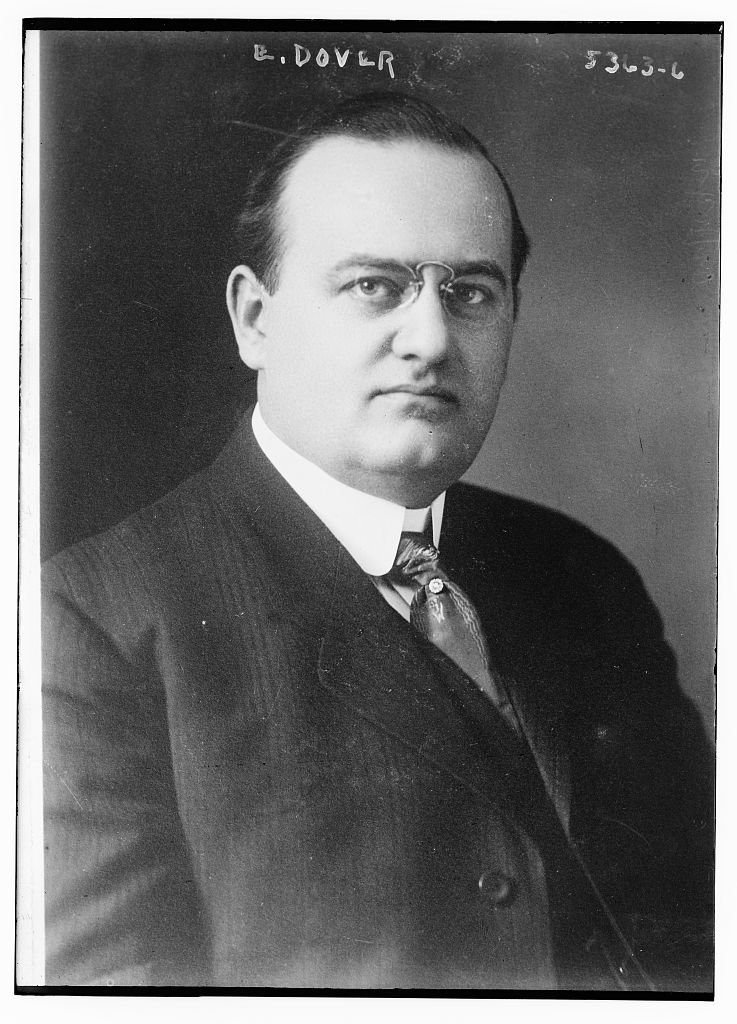

Assistant Secretary of the Treasury
- In office December 23, 1921 – July 25, 1922
- Nominated by: Warren G. Harding
- Preceded by: Edward G. Clifford
- Succeeded by: McKenzie Moss

Personal details
- Born: April 1, 1873 McConnelsville, Ohio
- Died: October 3, 1940 (aged 67) Tacoma, Washington
- Party: Republican
- Spouse: Martha Steele Peebles (1871–1931)

Elmer Dover. (April 1, 1873 – October 3, 1940) was an American political figure, businessman and journalist. He worked at several Ohio newspapers before becoming Senator Mark Hanna's private secretary. In 1904, he became the Secretary of the Republican National Committee. In 1911, Dover left politics and became the president of the Tacoma Gas Company. Dover briefly served as Assistant Secretary of the Treasury (1921-1922), during which time he was sent on diplomatic missions to Mexico by President Harding. He then returned to private industry. Later Dover would serve as Clerk of the Federal Court for the Western District of Washington.

Dover's obituary stated that he had been a personal friend of six presidents: McKinley, Theodore Roosevelt, Taft, Harding, Coolidge, and Hoover.

Dover was known for mentoring and supporting African Americans within the Republican Party.

== Personal life ==
On January 25, 1898, Dover married Martha Steele Peebles, daughter of John G. Peebles, a leading Portsmouth businessman. The couple had one child, a daughter named Mary Elizabeth, born October 5, 1899.

Party political offices
Preceded by Perry S. Heath	Secretary of the Republican National Committee; 1904–	Succeeded by
