= John Lawrence Caldwell =

American diplomat

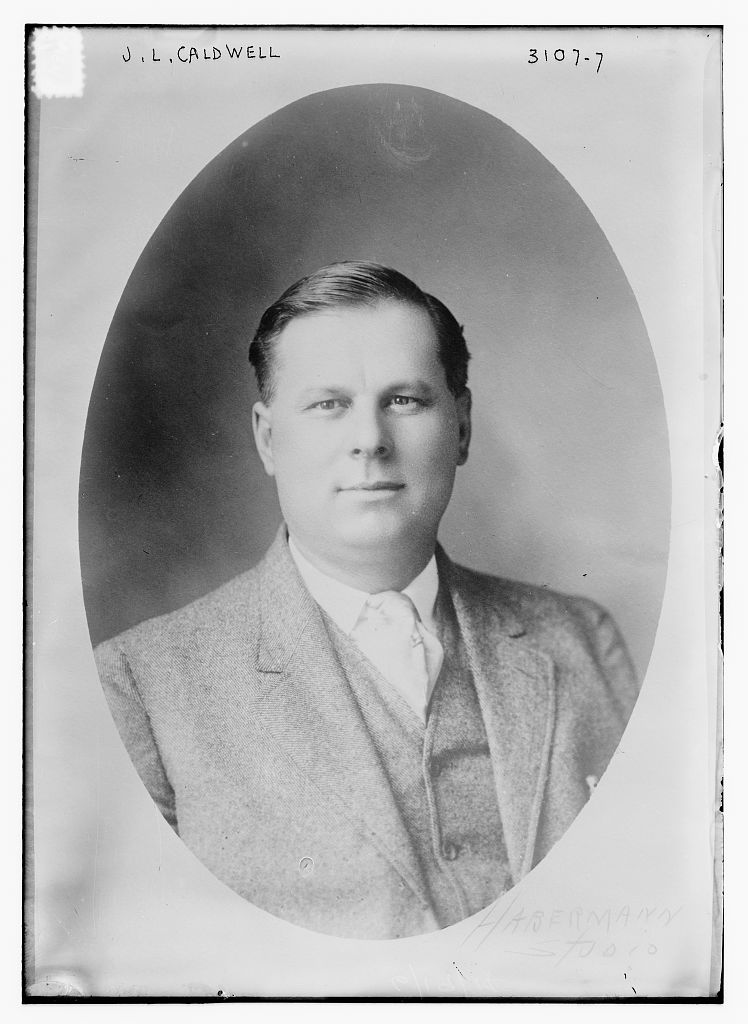
Caldwell in 1914

John Lawrence Caldwell (July 16, 1875 - December 6, 1922) was the United States Ambassador to Iran from 1914 to 1921.
