= Frederick S. Winston =

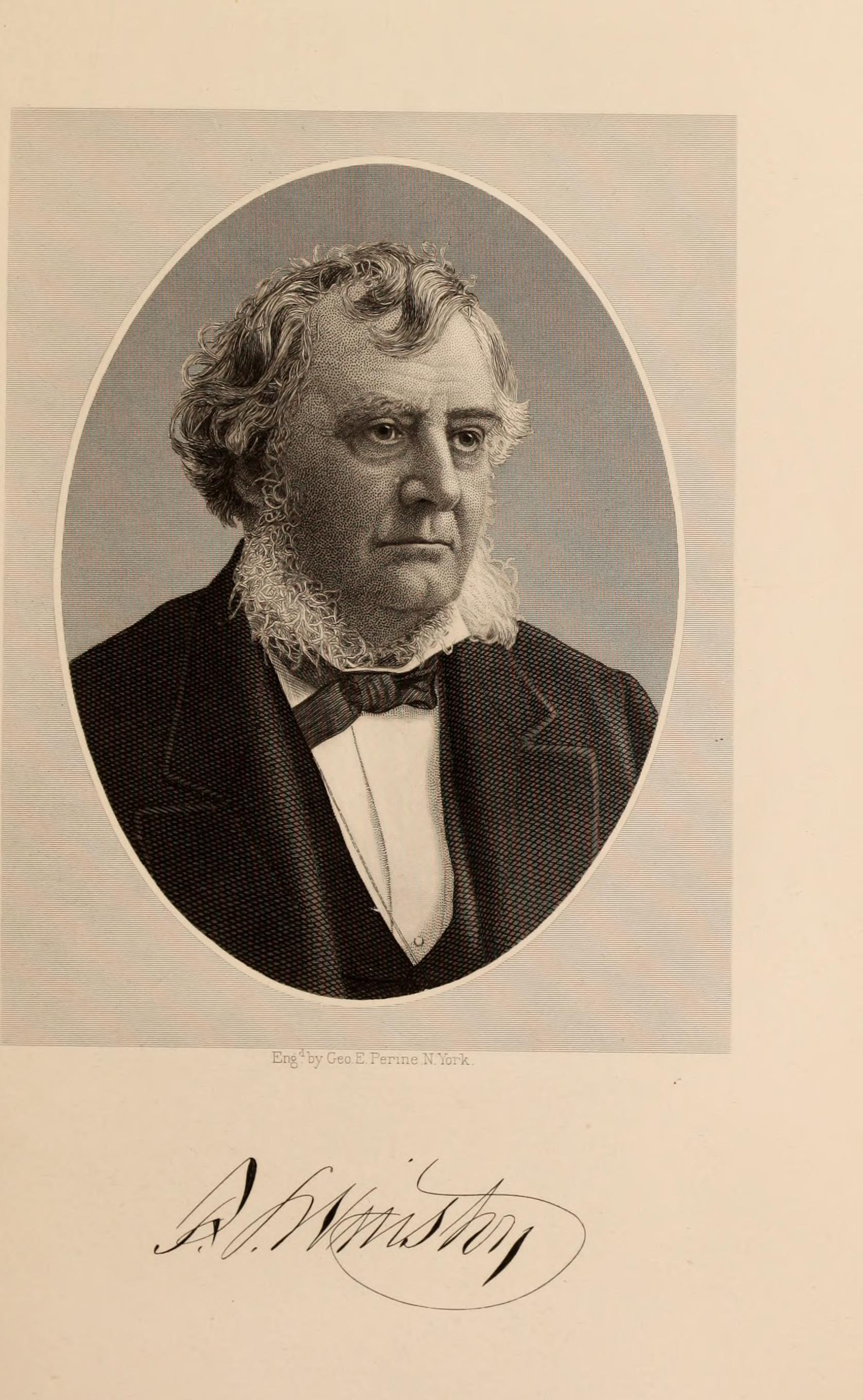
Portrait of Frederick S. Winston (1884)

Frederick Seymour Winston (October 14, 1806 – March 17, 1885) was an American businessman who served as president of the Mutual Life Insurance Company of New York.

== Early life ==
Winston was born on October 14, 1806, in Ballston Spa, New York, where he received "a good academic education." He was a son of Frederick Winston and Susan (née Seymour) Winston (1782–1856). His father was a native of Virginia, but moved to New York State early in life and became a farmer. His brother, the Rev. Dennis Mervyn Winston, was a close friend of Harrison Gray Otis Dwight, with whom he prepared for college under the instruction of Erastus Clark, graduated from Hamilton College, and studied theology with at Andover Theological Seminary. Through his brother, he was uncle to Frederick Hampden Winston, the U.S. Minister to Persia under President Grover Cleveland.

In 1896, at fourteen years old, Winston moved to New York City and entered the merchant's store of Halsted, Haines & Co., as a clerk.

== Career ==
He spent twenty-seven years as a prosperous merchant in the wholesale dry goods business on Pearl Street under his own name. In June 1853, he was elected president of the Mutual Life Insurance Company of New York, of which he had been a trustee since 1846, and served as president until his death in 1885 at age 79. "When he assumed the office of President, the assets of the company were about $2,000,000, and when he died the assets had swelled to $100,000,000, which is as forcible a comment as could be made upon the business capacity of the President." His tenure as president coincided with the Civil War, during which he honored the policies of all fallen Union soldiers while suspending policies south of the Mason–Dixon line.

Winston was instrumental in the construction of the Mutual Life Building at 34 Nassau Street, which was designed by architect Charles W. Clinton and was completed in 1884, and completed in twelve months, "a feat never before performed in his or any other land." The cornerstone for the building was set in May 1883 and was built on the site of the old Post Office which Mutual Life bought from the Government for $650,000. (Note: The site was once "the Middle Dutch Church, from whose towers Benjamin Franklin conducted some of his experiments. During the Revolutionary War, the British imprisoned some patriots within the church walls." In the 1800s, the Federal Government bought the church property and in 1844 "converted the building into New York's central post office.") Mutual Life occupied the building until 1950 when it moved to 1740 Broadway and sold 34 Nassau to Guaranty Trust Company of New York for $7,525,000.

== Personal life ==
In 1833, he married Lucy Anne Cotton (1812–1886), a daughter of the James Cotton of New York. Together, they lived at 13 West 31st Street were the parents of six children, including:

- Gustavus Storrs Winston (1834–1899), a physician who served in the Union Army during the Civil War, (Note: During the Civil War, he was surgeon with the Eighth Regiment, and was captured and confined in Libby Prison at Richmond, Virginia. He escaped through a friend of the Winston family, who, although Southern, sympathized with the North.) and was medical director of the Mutual Life; he married Jeannie Louise Lewis in 1880.
- Mary Hoadley Winston (1835–1918), who married Harvey B. Merrill; they were the parents of Frederick Winston Merrill, William Winston Merrill and Seymour Winston Merrill.
- Frederick Mervyn Winston (1836–1866), the cashier of Mutual Life; he married Mary Louise Erben, a daughter of Henry Erben, in 1861; they were the parents of lawyer Frederick James Winston.
- James Cook Winston (1839–1890), who served with Gen. Butler in the Civil War at the Capture of New Orleans; he was a corresponding clerk for Mutual Life for 25 years.
- Joseph Sands Winston (1844–1868), who attended Columbia College; he died in Vienna.
- Sarah Cotton Winston (1846–1921), who married George Gilpin, son of John Ferris Gilpin of Philadelphia, in 1872; she died at Territet, Switzerland.

Winston died from a paralytic stroke on March 17, 1885, in Fernandina, Florida. After a funeral at the Calvary Episcopal Church, of which he was a warden, he was buried at New York Marble Cemetery in Manhattan. His widow died just under a year later on March 14, 1886.
