= Frederick Hampden Winston =

American lawyer

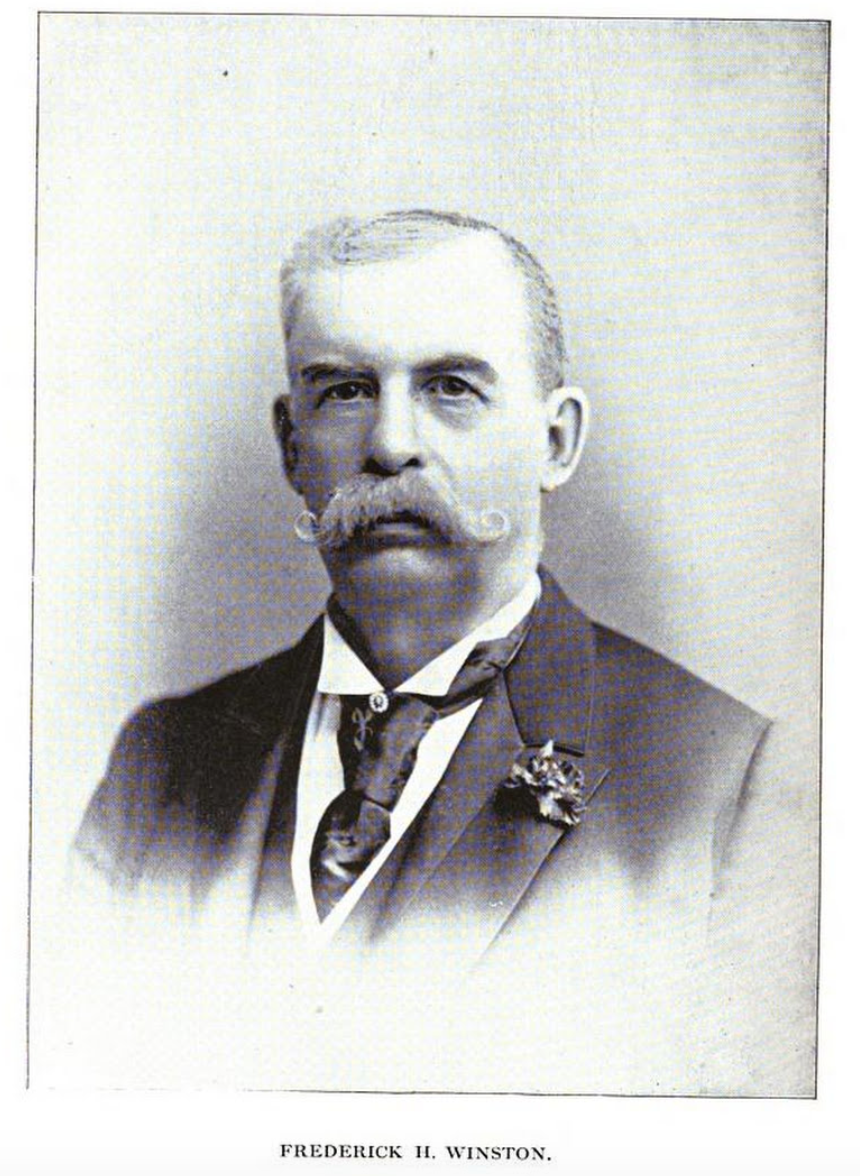

United States Minister to Persia
- In office 1885–1886
- President: Grover Cleveland
- Preceded by: Samuel G. W. Benjamin
- Succeeded by: E. Spencer Pratt

Personal details
- Born: November 2, 1830 Liberty County, Georgia
- Died: February 19, 1904 (aged 73) Magnolia Springs, Alabama
- Party: Democratic
- Relations: Frederick S. Winston (uncle); Garrard B. Winston (grandson)
- Parent(s): Mary McIntosh Winston; Rev. Dennis Mervyn Winston
- Education: Harvard Law School

Frederick Hampden Winston (November 2, 1830 — February 19, 1904) was an American lawyer who was one of the founders of the law firm that is today Winston & Strawn. He served as the American Minister to Persia from 1885 to 1886.

== Early life ==
Winston was born in Liberty County, Georgia on November 2, 1830. While he was a child, his family moved to Kentucky. He was a son of Mary (née McIntosh) Winston and the Rev. Dennis Mervyn Winston, a close friend of Harrison Gray Otis Dwight, with whom he graduated from Hamilton College, and studied theology with at Andover Theological Seminary before his death.

His paternal grandparents were Frederick Winston and Susan (née Seymour) Winston. His uncle was Frederick S. Winston, the longtime president of the Mutual Life Insurance Company of New York. His maternal grandparents were Charlotte Pepper (née Nephew) McIntosh and John Hampden McIntosh (son of Gen. Lachlan McIntosh).

After graduating from high school, Winston moved east to study, graduating from Harvard Law School in 1852. Upon graduation, he moved to New York City and was admitted to the bar of New York State.

== Career ==
After practicing law in New York for a year, in 1853, Winston moved to Chicago to launch a law practice there. From 1853 to 1861, Winston partnered with Norman B. Judd, a prominent Republican who nominated Abraham Lincoln at the 1860 Republican National Convention. In 1861, Lincoln appointed Judd as his Minister Plenipotentiary to Berlin, forcing Winston to find a new partner. He then partnered with Henry Williams Blodgett until 1870, when President of the United States Ulysses S. Grant appointed Blodgett to the United States District Court for the Northern District of Illinois. In 1865, Winston began a relationship with what would prove to be a long-term client, the Union Stock Yard and Transit Company of Chicago. Winston later represented three prominent railways: the Lake Shore and Michigan Southern Railway, the Chicago, Rock Island and Pacific Railroad, and the Pittsburgh, Fort Wayne and Chicago Railway.

Winston retired from active practice in 1885 and devoted time to his support of the Democratic Party. On October 28, 1885, President Grover Cleveland appointed Winston as American Minister to Persia. He was commissioned during a recess of the Senate but was recommissioned on January 13, 1886, after confirmation. Winston presented his credentials on April 5, 1885 and served until he left his post on June 10, 1886. Upon his resignation, he traveled in Russia, Scandinavia, and other countries.

Returning to the U.S. in 1886, he married his second wife in New Orleans. Following a six-month honeymoon in Europe and Africa, Winston returned to Chicago, and became the president of his former client, the Union Stock Yard and Transit Company of Chicago. He also became an organizer of the Lincoln National Bank in the later 1880s. During this period, Winston served as president of the Lincoln Park Commission for twelve years.

== Personal life ==
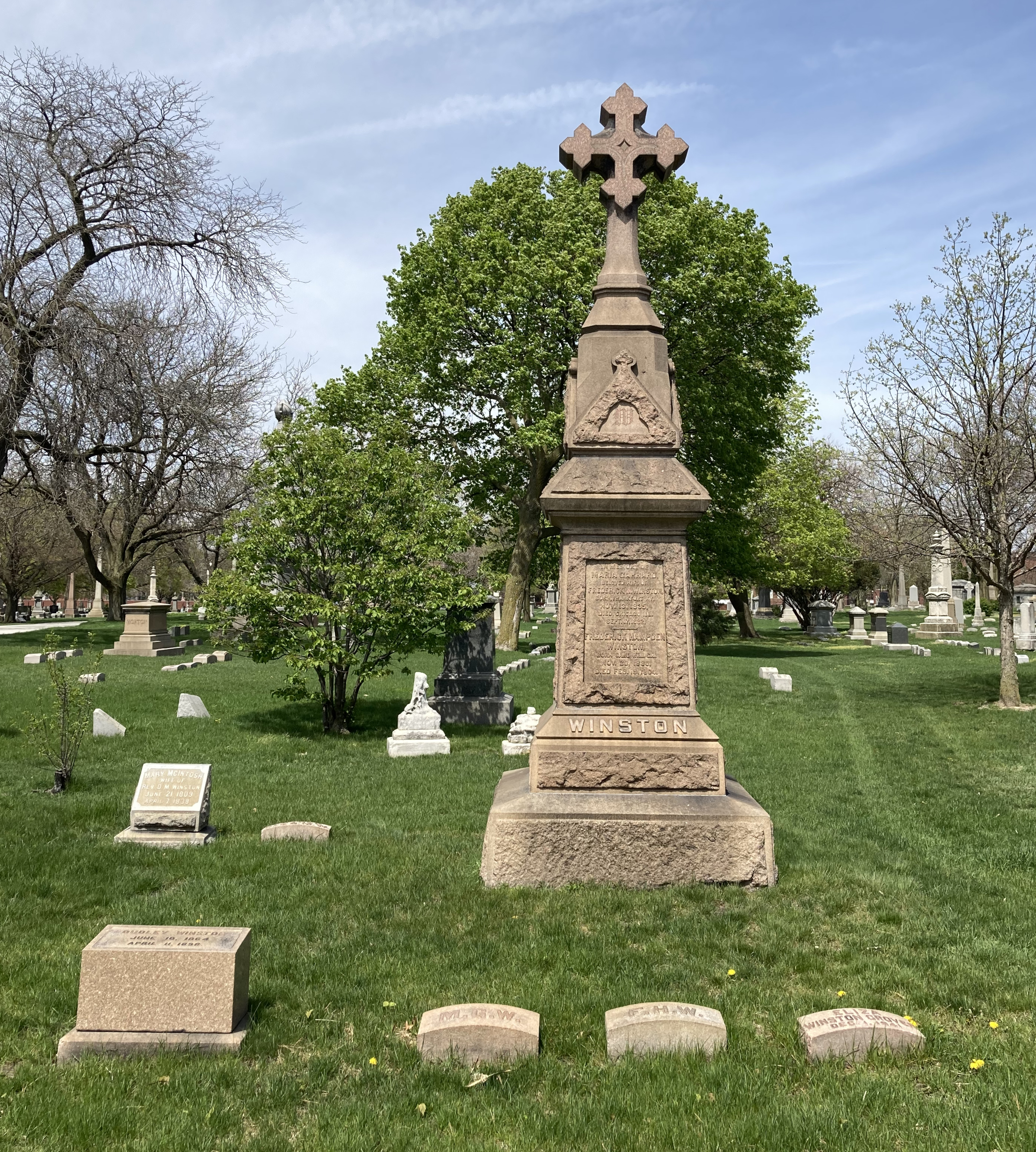
Winston's grave at Graceland Cemetery

Winston married Maria Garrard Dudley (1836–1882), daughter of General Ambrose William Dudley and Elizabeth Garrard (née Talbot) Dudley. Before his wife's death in 1882, they were the parents of six children, including:

- Frederick Seymour Winston (1856–1909), who joined his father's law practice in 1878; he married Ada Fountain (1858–1919) in 1876.
- Eliza Talbot Winston (1859–1941), who married Thomas Williams Grover (1846–1893) 1881.
- Dudley Winston (1864–1898), who married Grace Farwell, a daughter of U.S. Senator Charles B. Farwell, in 1888; After his death, she married Robert Greaves McGann in 1906.
- Bertram McIntosh Winston (1868–1933), who married Anne Odell (1869–1950), a daughter of J. W. Odell, in 1901.
- Marie Winston (1871–1932), who married Wirt Dexter Walker (1860–1899) in 1894. After his death, she married Victor Elting (1871–1956) in 1904.
- Ralph Talbot Winston (1878–1948).

In November 1896, he married Sallie Reeves Hews (b. 1872), a daughter of Edson Lawrence Hews, at Trinity Church in New Orleans.

In poor health, Winston retired to Florida in his later years, dying near Magnolia Springs, Alabama on February 19, 1904. He was buried at Graceland Cemetery in Chicago. After his death, in 1906 his widow married the Rev. ZeBarney Thorne Phillips, an Episcopal clergyman who served as Chaplain of the Senate from 1927 to 1942.

=== Descendants ===
Through his eldest son, he was a grandfather of Garrard B. Winston, Under Secretary of the Treasury from 1923 to 1927.
