= David Wooster King =

Lt. Col. David Wooster King (5 July 1893 – 5 September 1975) was an American Army officer, legionnaire and author.

King was born in Wickford, Rhode Island, the son of Jose Berre King (né Hart) and Louise Wooster. His maternal grandfather Jerome Bonapart King had established the hugely successful family firm, Knickerbocker Plaster Mills, in New York. His uncle Vincent C. King was a New York Assemblyman in the 1860s.

He was a student at Harvard University from 1912–1914, he subsequently enlisted in the French Foreign Legion in August 1917. He later transferred to the French Army in 1915

In November 1917 was commissioned as a 1st lieutenant in the United States Army. The following month he received a diplomatic passport.

He was also an author, and wrote a book about his experiences in the Legion and the French Army, L.M.8046: An Intimate Story of the French Foreign Legion, alternate title: Ten Thousand Shall Fall, (NY: Duffield & Company, 1927).

In 1926, his father's estate was worth more than $3 million (equivalent to $57,593,000 in 2024)

He died in Chester, Connecticut.
