= John Wesley Snyder =

American politician (1895–1985)

John Snyder
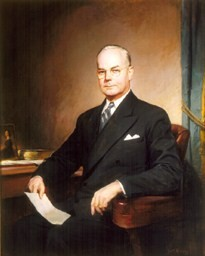

54th United States Secretary of the Treasury
- In office June 25, 1946 – January 20, 1953
- President: Harry S. Truman
- Preceded by: Fred M. Vinson
- Succeeded by: George M. Humphrey

Personal details
- Born: John Wesley Snyder; June 21, 1895 Jonesboro, Arkansas, U.S.
- Died: October 8, 1985 (aged 90) Seabrook Island, South Carolina, U.S.
- Resting place: Washington National Cathedral
- Party: Democratic
- Spouse: Evlyn Cook (m. 1920; died 1956)
- Children: 1
- Education: Vanderbilt University

Military service
- Branch/service: US Army; Arkansas National Guard (Reserves)
- Years of service: 1915-1919
- Rank: Colonel
- Battles/wars: World War I

John Wesley Snyder (June 21, 1895 – October 8, 1985) was an American businessman and senior federal government official. Thanks to his close personal friendship with President Harry S. Truman, Snyder was appointed Secretary of the Treasury during the Truman administration. He was the first native-born Arkansan to hold a U.S. Cabinet post.

Historian Alonzo Hamby emphasizes Snyder's conservatism, noting that he was openly skeptical of New Deal policies, broad social programs, and intellectuals who believed the economy could be centrally managed from Washington.

== Early life ==
Snyder was born in Jonesboro, Arkansas, on June 21, 1895, to Jeremiah "Jerre" Hartwell Snyder and his wife, Ellen (Hatcher). He was the third of six children. His father owned a small patent medicine manufacturing and distribution business in Jonesboro. Snyder received his early education through high school in Jonesboro and later attended Vanderbilt University’s School of Engineering from 1914 to 1915. Due to financial difficulties, he left the university and returned to Arkansas, moving to Forrest City, Arkansas, where he boarded with his sister, Sula Snyder Warren, and taught at a small country school.

In 1915, Snyder volunteered for the army and trained at Fort Logan H. Roots in North Little Rock, Arkansas, in the artillery. He served with distinction as an officer in the Thirty-Second Artillery. During World War I, he saw action in five different sectors of the Western Front and was decorated for his service by both the United States and France. During his time in the artillery, he became friends with several notable Americans, including boxer Gene Tunney, America’s “ace of aces” fighter pilot Eddie Rickenbacker, and future presidents Dwight Eisenhower and Harry S. Truman (both of whom also served in the artillery). Snyder was mustered out of the army in 1919 and returned to Arkansas after the war. He retained his commission as a captain and eventually achieved the rank of colonel in the Army Reserve.

On January 5, 1920, he married Carrie Evlyn Cook (1895–1956). They had one daughter, Edith Cook "Drucie" Snyder Horton (1925–1999), born in Forrest City, Arkansas. Although Snyder initially planned to return to school to become an electrical engineer, he took his first job in the banking industry as a bookkeeper at a bank in Forrest City, at the urging of his uncle. Over the next ten years, he advanced rapidly in his profession, working as an officer at numerous banks in Arkansas and Missouri.

== Washington ==
Snyder moved to Washington in the early 1930s with extensive experience in banking and business. He held several public and private offices, including National Bank Receiver in the Office of the Comptroller of the Currency, Federal Loan Administrator, and Director of War Mobilization and Reconversion. In the latter role, he played a key part in transitioning the American economy from a wartime to a peacetime footing. However, liberals criticized him for removing federal controls on the economy too quickly after the war, arguing that this hurt consumers, delayed the housing program, and bankrupted small businesses. His biographer noted that, "His handling of the steel crisis in 1946 was an even greater fiasco."

== Treasury Secretary ==
Snyder was appointed Secretary of the Treasury in 1946 by his close personal friend, President Harry S. Truman, with whom he had served in the Army Reserves. Editorials criticized the appointment for cronyism and argued that Snyder's narrow range of experience made him unfit for the role. His main task as Secretary was to establish a stable postwar economy. The key elements of his program included maintaining confidence in the government's credit, reducing the federal debt, keeping interest rates low, and encouraging public thrift through investment in U.S. Savings Bonds. A deeply conservative businessman, Snyder believed that the free market would ultimately stabilize itself. He successfully reduced the national debt while balancing the budget, but he was reluctant to support large expenditures for the Marshall Plan, which provided aid to Europe.

Snyder's lack of diplomatic experience showed during his negotiations with British officials over the UK's need for U.S. dollars. He upset his British counterparts, including Chancellor of the Exchequer Hugh Gaitskell. Paul Nitze, an American negotiator, recalled a 1949 meeting in Washington where Snyder made undiplomatic remarks, essentially telling the British to "get off their butt" and solve their productivity problems. Gaitskell described Snyder as "a pretty small minded, small town semi-isolationist." Fortunately for the British, Snyder was outmaneuvered by Secretary of State Dean Acheson, who was more sympathetic to their situation.

Snyder funded the Korean War by raising taxes, and his tenure was marked by constant feuding with the Federal Reserve System, which gained greater independence in 1951. He retired from government service in 1953 at the end of Truman's second term.

Snyder died in Seabrook Island, South Carolina, on October 8, 1985, at the age of 90, and was buried in Washington National Cathedral.

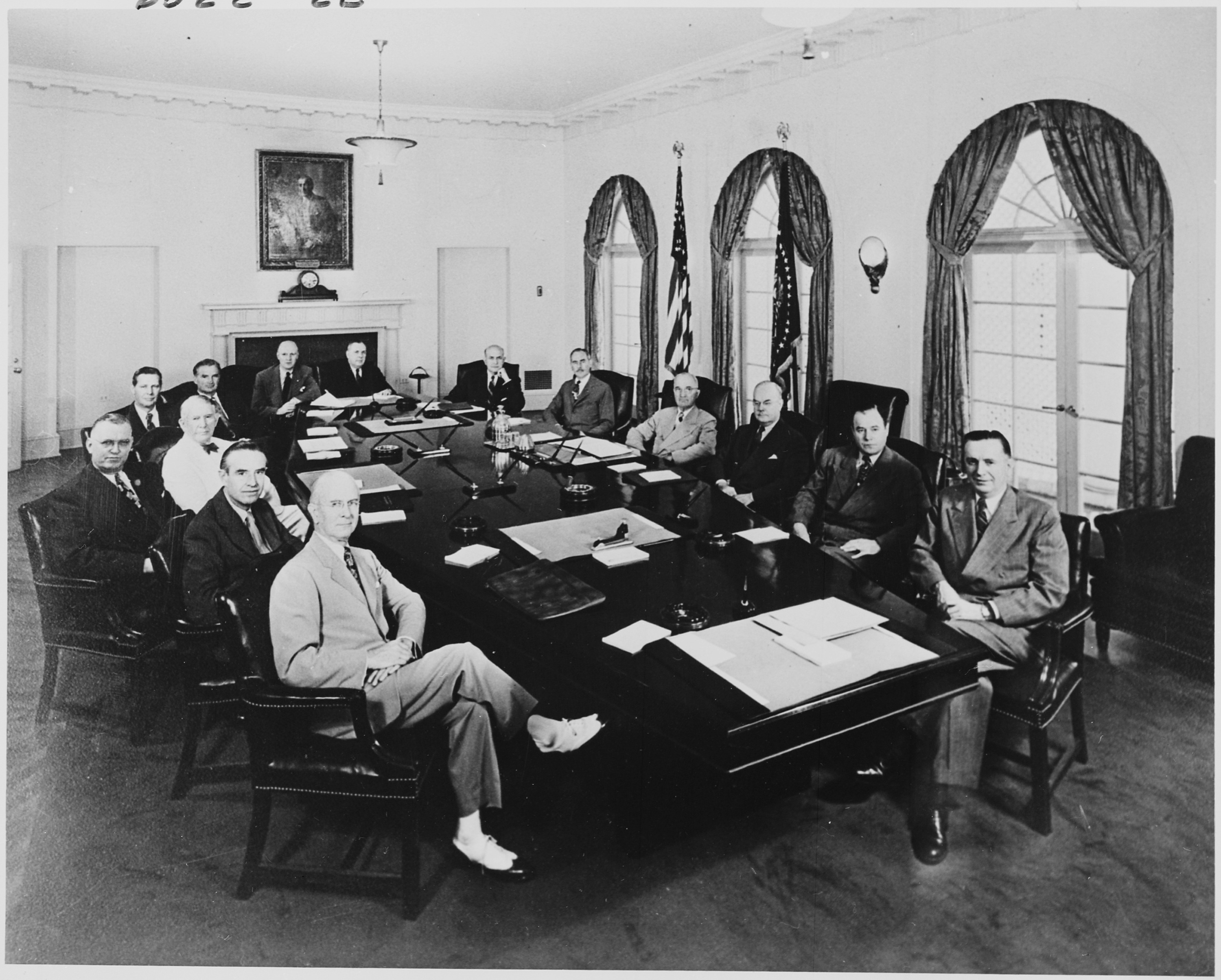
Snyder (third from right) as the U.S. Secretary of the Treasury, with the Truman cabinet, 1950.

== Primary sources ==
- Oral History Interview with John W. Snyder, at the Truman Library
- Snyder, John F. "The Treasury and Economic Policy" in Francis Howard Heller, ed. Economics and the Truman administration (Univ Press of Kansas, 1981). pp 24–27

Political offices
Preceded by Fred M. Vinson	U.S. Secretary of the Treasury; Served under: Harry S. Truman; 1946–1953	Succeeded by George M. Humphrey
