= Peter Grayson Washington =

American government official

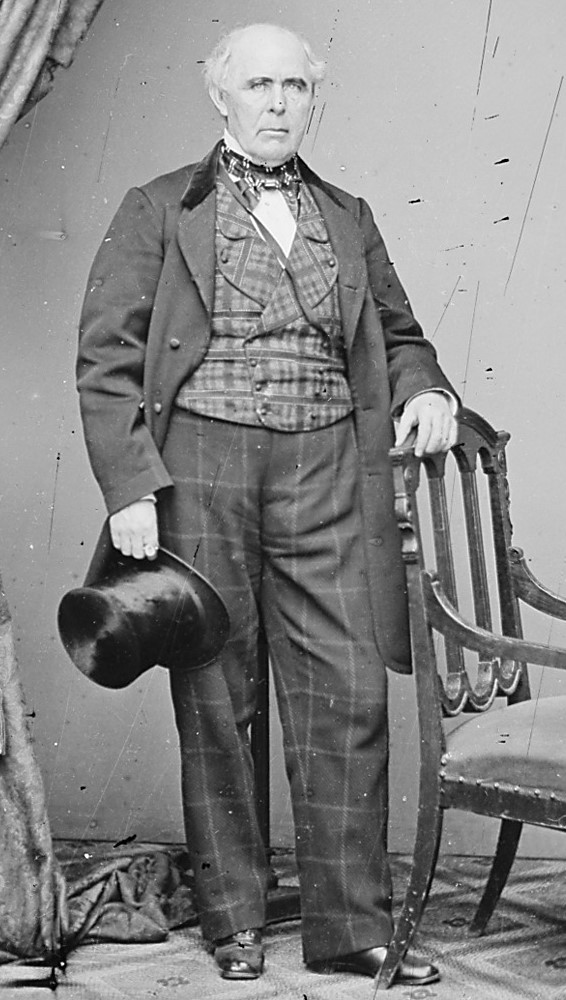
- Photograph of Washington, by Mathew Brady, c. 1860–1865

U.S. Assistant Secretary of the Treasury
- In office March 14, 1853 – March 12, 1857
- Preceded by: William L. Hodge
- Succeeded by: Philip Clayton

Personal details
- Born: August 31, 1798; Virginia, US
- Died: February 10, 1872 (aged 73); New York City, US
- Spouse: Margaret MacPherson (m. 1822)

Peter Grayson Washington (August 31, 1798 – February 10, 1872) was an American official who served as U.S. Assistant Secretary of the Treasury.

== Early life ==
Washington was born in 1798 in Virginia. He was a son of Susan Monroe (née Grayson) Washington (1770–1822) and Lund Washington (1767–1853), the postmaster of Washington, D.C. After his mother's death in 1822, his father married Sarah Johnson, a daughter of Capt. John Johnson.

His father was named for his uncle, Lund Washington, who was the neighbor and distant cousin of President George Washington. His paternal grandparents were Robert Washington and Alice (née Strother) Washington. His maternal grandparents were Mary Elizabeth (née Wagener) Grayson and the Rev. Spence Monroe Grayson, brother of U.S. Senator William Grayson (through their mother, they were cousins of James Monroe).

== Career ==
Washington began his career as a clerk in the United States Treasury. He was later promoted to Chief Clerk of the Treasurer's Office, Chief Clerk of Sixth Auditor; First Assistant Postmaster General, and Assistant Secretary of the Treasury under Secretary James Guthrie and Howell Cobb under Presidents Franklin Pierce and James Buchanan. He was a vice president of the Association of the Oldest Inhabitants of the District of Columbia (AOI) and was a member of the Washington National Monument Association.

== Personal life ==
In 1822, Washington was married to Margaret MacPherson (1786–1874), a daughter of Gen. William MacPherson and Margaret Stout MacPherson. Margaret's younger brother, Joseph Stout MacPherson, was married to Peter's younger sister, Mary Elizabeth Washington. Together, they were the parents of:

- Virginia Grayson Washington (1824–1869), who died unmarried.
- Julia Maria Washington (1827–1914), who married Dr. Caleb W. Hornor in 1859.
- William McPherson Washington (1828–1849), who died unmarried.

Washington died in New York City on February 10, 1872. His funeral was held in Washington at the Church of the Epiphany and conducted by the Rev. Dr. Starkey.
