= List of ambassadors of the United States to Iran =

Ambassador of the United States to Iran
- Seal of the United States Department of State

- Flag used by United States ambassadors to Iran
- Incumbent; None
- Nominator: The president of the United States
- Inaugural holder: Leland Burnette Morris
- Formation: 1944
- Abolished: 1979

Prior to 1944, Iran was not served by a United States ambassador; instead, a diplomatic minister was sent. The first ambassador was named in 1944.

After the Iran hostage crisis in 1979, the United States terminated diplomatic relations with the Iranian government, therefore no ambassadors have since been appointed. The United States government has since then been represented in Iran by the United States Interests Section of the Embassy of Switzerland in Tehran.

== Ambassadors ==
This is a list of United States ambassadors and other heads of diplomatic missions to Iran.

=== Iran ===
- Henry Harris Jessup - nominated for Chargé d'Affaires but withdrawn before approval
- Samuel G. W. Benjamin (1883–1885) - first Chargé d'Affaires, but promoted to Minister Resident almost immediately
- Bayless W. Hanna (1885) - Minister Resident - took oath of office but did not go to Persia
- Frederick H. Winston (1885–1886) - Minister Resident
- E. Spencer Pratt (1886–1891) - Minister Resident
- Truxtun Beale (1891–1892) - Minister Resident
- Watson R. Sperry (1892–1893) - Minister Resident
- Alexander McDonald (1893–1897) - Minister Plenipotentiary, later Minister Resident
- Arthur S. Hardy (1897–1899) - Minister Resident
- William P. Lord (1899) - would have been Minister Resident, but declined appointment
- Herbert W. Bowen (1899–1901) - Minister Resident
- Lloyd C. Griscom (1901–1902) - Minister Plenipotentiary
- Richmond Pearson (1902–1907) - Minister Plenipotentiary
- John Brinkerhoff Jackson (1907–1909) - Minister Plenipotentiary
- Charles Wells Russell Jr. (1909–1914) - Minister Plenipotentiary
- John L. Caldwell (1914–1921) - Minister Plenipotentiary
- Joseph Saul Kornfeld (1921–1924) - Minister Plenipotentiary
- Hoffman Philip (1925–1928) - Minister Plenipotentiary
- Charles C. Hart (1929–1933) - Minister Plenipotentiary, last envoy accredited to "Persia"
- William H. Hornibrook (1934–1936) - Minister Plenipotentiary
- Gordon P. Merriam (1936–1937) - Chargé d'Affaires
- Cornelius Van H. Engert (1937–1940) - Chargé d'Affaires
- Louis G. Dreyfus Jr. (1940–1943) - Minister Plenipotentiary
- Leland B. Morris (1944–1945) - First ambassador
- Wallace Murray (1945–1946)
- George V. Allen (1946–1948)
- John C. Wiley (1948–1950)
- Henry F. Grady (1950–1951)
- Loy W. Henderson (1951–1954)
- Julius C. Holmes - nominated, but nomination withdrawn before approved
- Selden Chapin (1955–1958)
- Edward T. Wailes (1958–1961)
- Julius C. Holmes (1961–1965)
- Armin H. Meyer (1965–1969)
- Douglas MacArthur II (1969–1972)
- Joseph S. Farland (1972–1973)
- Richard Helms (1973–1977)
- William H. Sullivan (1977–1979)
- Walter L. Cutler - nominated, but rejected by Iran
- Bruce Laingen (1979–1980) - Chargé d'Affaires, seized with the embassy on November 4, 1979. He was later released.

== See also ==
- Embassy of the United States, Tehran
- Iran–United States relations
- Foreign relations of Iran
- Ambassadors of the United States
- American School in Tehran
