= Pardons for ex-Confederates =

U.S. government pardons

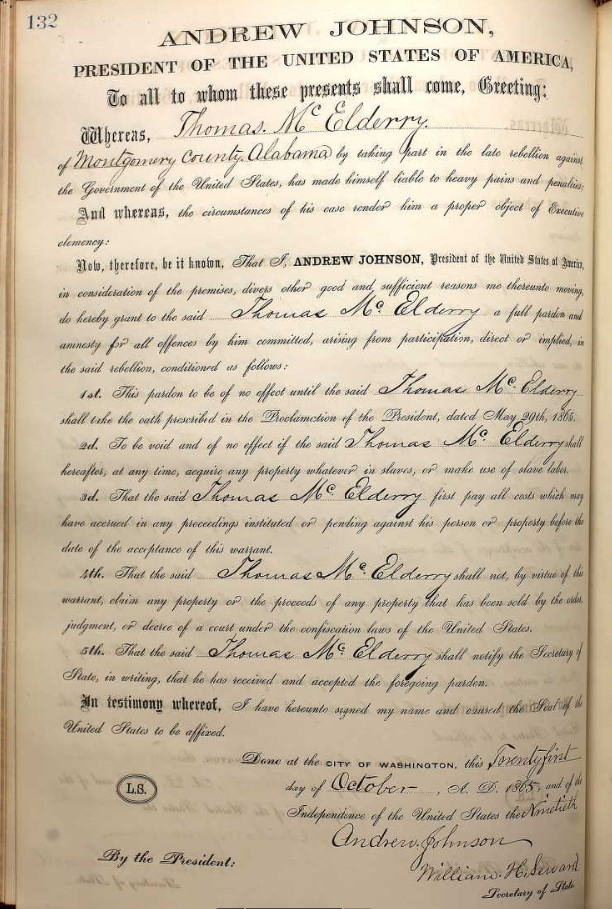
Colonel Thomas McElderry's Pardon from Andrew Johnson

Both during and after the American Civil War, pardons for ex-Confederates were given by US presidents Abraham Lincoln and Andrew Johnson and were usually extended for those who had served in the military above the rank of colonel or civilians who had exercised political power under the Confederate government. The power to pardon offences to the US government was given to the chief executive in the US Constitution under Article II.

== Abraham Lincoln ==
On December 8, 1863, in his annual message to Congress, President Lincoln outlined his plans for reconstruction of the South, which included terms for amnesty to former Confederates. A pardon would require an oath of allegiance, but it would not restore ownership to former slaves, or restore confiscated property which involved a third party. The pardon excluded office holders of the Confederate government or persons who had mistreated prisoners. Congress, however, objected to Lincoln's plans as being too lenient and refused to recognize delegates from the reconstructed governments of Louisiana and Arkansas. Congress instead passed the Wade–Davis Bill, which required half of any former Confederate state's voters to swear allegiance to the United States and also swear that they had not supported the Confederacy. The bill also ended slavery, but did not allow former slaves to vote. President Lincoln pocket vetoed the bill. During his presidency Lincoln issued 64 pardons for war-related offences; 22 for conspiracy, 17 for treason, 12 for rebellion, 9 for holding an office under the Confederacy, and 4 for serving with the rebels.

Under the terms of surrender for the Army of Northern Virginia at Appomattox Court House on April 10, 1865, General Ulysses S. Grant stipulated that "each officer and man will be allowed to return to his home, not to be disturbed by United States authority so long as they observe their paroles and the laws in force where they may reside". On May 5 the parole was extended so that soldiers from the 11 Confederate states, plus West Virginia, would be allowed to return home on their paroles but that "all who claim homes in the District of Columbia and in States that never passed the Ordinance of Secession (Maryland, Kentucky, and Missouri included) have forfeited them and can only return thereto by complying with the Amnesty Proclamation of the president and obtaining special permission from the War Department".

== Andrew Johnson ==
As Johnson assumed the presidency, his attitude toward Confederate leaders seemed to signify punishment and prosecution for the rebellion. Many southern leaders fled the United States, going to Mexico, Canada, Europe and other countries. He doubled the number of exempted classes that had been exempted by Lincoln. Johnson's proclamation of May 29, 1865, for example, did not include anyone whose personal property exceeded $20,000 (equivalent to $421,000 in 2025). Several mitigating factors however led Johnson to greater clemency, such as the attitude of Lincoln for reconciliation and William H. Seward's similar leniency towards the former rebels.

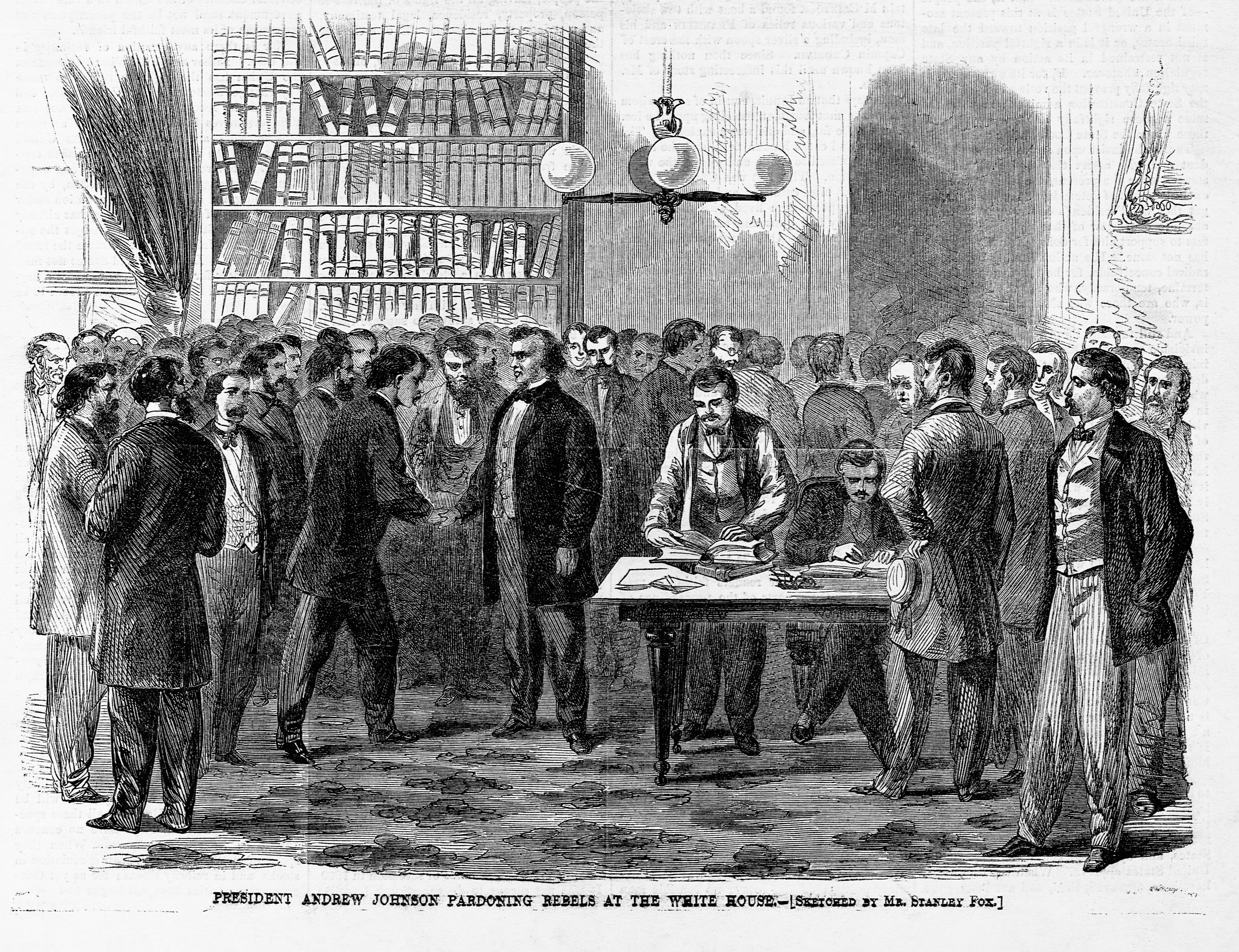
"President Andrew Johnson Pardoning Rebels at the White House", Harper's Weekly, October 14, 1865

Those excluded from general amnesty had the option of applying to the president for a special pardon, and much of Johnson's time was spent in granting those pardons.

The following oath was required under Johnson's 1865 proclamation:

I, _____, do solemnly swear or affirm, in presence of Almighty God, that I will henceforth faithfully support and defend the Constitution of the United States and the Union of the States thereunder. And that I will, in like manner, abide by and faithfully support all laws and proclamations which have been made during the existing rebellion with reference to the emancipation of slaves, so help me God.

There were exceptions to the granting of general amnesty:

The following classes of persons are excepted from the benefits of this proclamation:

First – All who are or shall have been pretended civil or diplomatic officers, or otherwise domestic or foreign agents of the pretended Confederate Government.

Second – All who left judicial stations under the United States to aid the rebellion.

Third – All who shall have been military or naval officers of said pretended Confederate Government above the rank of Colonel in the army or Lieutenant in the navy.

Fourth – All who left seats in the Congress of the United States to aid the rebellion.

Fifth – All who resigned or tendered resignations of their commissions in the army or navy of the United States, to evade duty in resisting the rebellion.

Sixth – All who have engaged in any way in treating otherwise than lawfully as prisoners of war persons found in the United States service, as officers, soldiers, seamen, or in other capacities.

Seventh – All persons who have been or are absentees from the United States for the purpose of aiding the rebellion.

Eighth – All military and naval officers in the rebel service who were educated by the government in the Military Academy at West Point, or the United States Naval Academy.

Ninth – All persons who held the pretended offices of Governors of States in insurrection against the United States.

Tenth – All persons who left their homes within the jurisdiction and protection of the United States and passed beyond the Federal military lines into the so-called Confederate States, for the purpose of aiding the rebellion.

Eleventh – All parties who have been engaged in the destruction of the commerce of the United States upon the high seas, and all persons who have made raids into the United States from Canada, or been engaged in destroying the commerce of the United States upon the lakes and rivers that separate the British Provinces from the United States.

Twelfth – All persons who at the time when they seek to obtain the benefits hereof by taking the oath herein prescribed, are in military naval, or civil confinement, or custody, or under bonds of the civil, military or naval authorities or agents of the United States, as prisoners of war, or persons detained for offences of any kind either before or after conviction.

Thirteenth – All persons who have voluntarily participated in said rebellion, and the estimated value of whose taxable property is over twenty thousand dollars.

Fourteenth – All persons who have taken the oath of amnesty as prescribed in the President's Proclamation of December 8, A.D., 1863, or an oath of allegiance to the Government of the United States since the dates of said proclamation, and who have not thenceforward kept and maintained the same inviolate – provided that special application may be made to the President for pardon by any person belonging to the excepted classes, and such clemency will be liberally extended as may be consistent with the facts of the case and the peace and dignity of the United States.

There were 12,652 pardons issued by June 5, 1866. Under Johnson's "thirteenth" exemption the number of pardons was issued in this order: Virginia, 2,070; Alabama, 1,361; Georgia 1,228; Mississippi, 765; South Carolina, 638; North Carolina, 482; Texas, 269; Louisiana, 142; Tennessee, 93; Arkansas, 41; West Virginia, 39; Florida, 22; Kentucky, 11; Missouri, 10.

On January 9, 1867, President Johnson sent Congress a list of high level former Confederates for whom he had issued pardons. The Nashville Telegraph and Union published a partial list of names, states, and causes for the pardons on January 13, 1867.

"Executive Clemency, A List of Prominent Confederates Pardoned by the President. The President sent to the House of Representatives on the 9th inst. a partial list of the Confederates who have been pardoned by him, and the parties upon whose recommendation they were pardoned. He states in his communication that there would not be time during the present session of Congress to make the list complete as called for by that body. The list embraces all of the more prominent cases in each of the Southern States, as follows:

Maryland

- Frederick Chatard, rebel navy
- Bradley T. Johnson, rebel brigadier general
- George H. Steward [sic], rebel major general
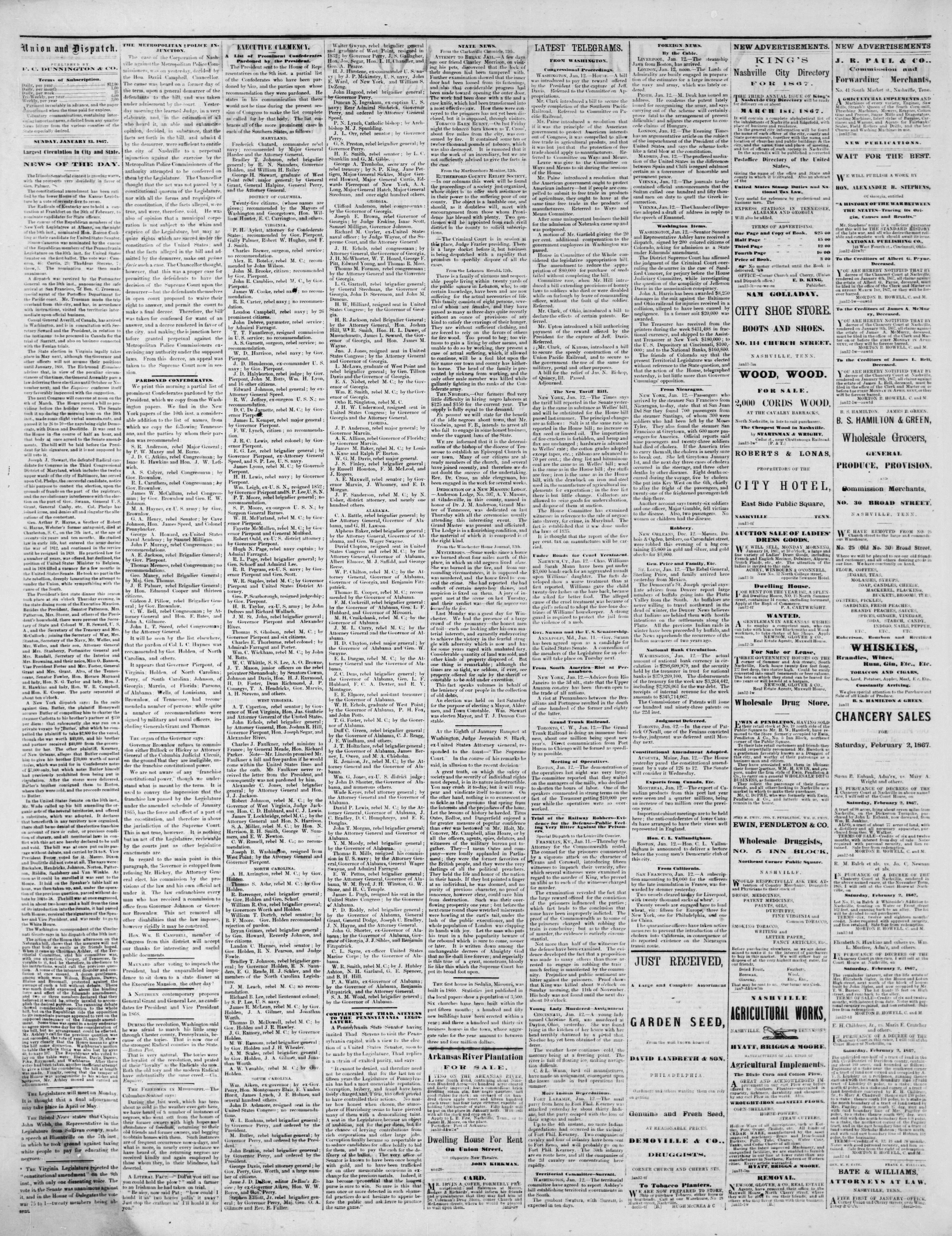
  Nashville Telegraph and Union, January 13, 1867
- Colonel Andrew Cross Trippe, Army General.

District of Columbia

- Twenty-five citizens, recommended by the mayors of Washington & Georgetown

Virginia

- P.H. Aylett, attorney for Confederate States
- Charles Brewer, surgeon, rebel service
- Alex. R. Boteler, rebel M.C.
- John M. Brooke, citizen
- John R. Cambliss [sic], rebel M.C.
- James W. Cooke, rebel navy
- R.R. Carter, rebel navy
- London Campbell, rebel navy
- John Debree, paymaster, rebel service
- T.T. Fauntleroy, resigned commission in U.S. service
- A.S. Garnett, surgeon, rebel service
- W.D. Harrison, rebel navy
- J.D. Henderson, ex-commander U.S. Navy
- J.D. Halyburton, rebel judge
- Edward Johnson, rebel general
- R.W. Jeffrey, ex-surgeon U.S.N.
- D.C. De Jarnette, rebel M.C.
- James L. Kemper, rebel major general
- F.W. Lynch, citizen
- J.R.C. Lewis, rebel colonel
- E.G. Lee, rebel brigadier general
- James Lyons, rebel M.C.
- H.H. Lewis, rebel navy
- Wm. Leigh, ex-U.S.N.
- P.T. Moore, rebel brigadier general
- S.P. Moore, ex-surgeon U.S.N
- W.H. McFarland, rebel M.C.
- Fayette McMullen, rebel M.C.
- Robert Ould, ex-U.S. district attorney
- Hugh N. Page, rebel navy captain
- R.L. Page, rebel brigadier general
- R.B. Pegram, ex-U.S.N.
- W.R. Staples, rebel M.C.
- Geo. P. Scarborough, resigned judgeship
- H.B. Taylor, ex-U.S. army
- J.M. St. John, rebel brigadier general
- Thomas S. Gholson, rebel M.C.
- Charles E. Thorburne, rebel colonel
- Wm. C. Wickham, rebel M.C.
- W.C. Whittle, S.S. Lee, A.O. Browne, J.T. Mason, junior officers on the rebel privateer "Shenandoah"

West Virginia

- A.T. Caperton, rebel senator
- John Echols, rebel brigadier general
- Charles J. Faulkner, rebel minister to France
- Alexander C. Jones, rebel brigadier general
- Robert Johnson [sic], rebel M.C.
- James T. Lockbridge, rebel M.C.
- S.A. Miller, rebel M.C.
- C.W. Russell, rebel M.C.
- Joseph B. Washington, resigned from West Point

North Carolina

- A.H. Arrington, rebel M.C.
- Thomas S. Ashe, rebel M.C.
- R. Barrenger [sic], rebel brigadier general
- William R. Cox, rebel brigadier general
- William T. Dortch, rebel senator
- Bryan Grimes, rebel brigadier general
- Landon C. Haynes, rebel senator
- Bradley T. Johnson, rebel brigadier general
- J.M. Leach, rebel M.C.
- Richard B. Lee, rebel lieutenant colonel
- James R. McLean, rebel M.C.
- Thomas D. McDowell, rebel M.C.
- J.G. Ramsey [sic], rebel M.C.
- M.W. Ransom, rebel brigadier general
- A.M. Seales, rebel brigadier general
- A.W. Venable, rebel M.C.

South Carolina

- Wm. Aiken, ex-governor
- John D. Ashmore, resigned seat in the U.S. Congress
- W.L. Bonham [sic], rebel brigadier general
- M. Butler, rebel brigadier general
- John Bratton, rebel brigadier general
- George Davis, rebel attorney general
- Jesse J.D. DeBow, editor DeBow's Review
- Stephen Elliott, Jr., rebel brigadier general
- Walter Gwynn, rebel brigadier general
- H.J. Harstene, ex-commander U.S. navy
- John Hagood, rebel brigadier general
- Duncan N. Ingraham, ex-captain U.S. navy
- P.N. Lynch, Catholic bishop
- J.L. Orr, rebel senator
- G.S. Preston [sic], rebel brigadier general
- H.E. Smith, rebel senator
- George A. Trenholm, secretary of the rebel treasury

Georgia

- Clifford Anderson, rebel congressman
- Joseph E. Brown, rebel governor of Georgia
- Richard M. Cuyler, ex-U.S. naval officer
- J.H. Echols, rebel congressman
- Thomas M. Forman, rebel congressman
- L.G. Gartrell [sic], rebel brigadier general
- H.W. Hilliard, resigned seat in U.S. Congress
- H.R. Jackson, rebel brigadier general
- Jno. J. Jones, resigned seat in U.S. Congress
- L. McLaws, graduate of West Point, rebel brigadier general
- E.A. Nisbet, rebel M.C.
- Wm. E. Smith, rebel M.C.
- Otho R. Singleton, rebel M.C.
- J.H.W. Underwood [sic], resigned seat in U.S. Congress

Florida

- J.P. Anderson, rebel major general
- A.K. Allison, rebel governor of Florida
- James M. Baker, rebel M.C.
- W.G.M. Davis, rebel major general
- J.S. Finley [sic], rebel brigadier general
- A.E. Maxwell, rebel senator
- J.P. Sanderson, rebel M.C.

Alabama

- C.A. Battle, rebel brigadier general
- Alpheus Baker, rebel brigadier general
- David Clopton, resigned seat in U.S. Congress
- W.P. Chilton, rebel M.C.
- Thomas B. Cooper, rebel M.C.
- F.M. Cockerill, rebel brigadier general
- M.H. Cruikshank, rebel M.C.
- J.M.L. Curry [sic], rebel M.C.
- H.D. Clayton, rebel major general
- E.L. Dargan [sic], rebel M.C.
- Z.C. Deas, rebel brigadier general
- E.E. Elmore [sic], rebel assistant treasurer
- W.H. Echols, graduate of West Point
- T.G. Foster [sic], rebel M.C.
- Duff C. Green, rebel brigadier general
- J.T. Holtzclare [sic], rebel brigadier general
- R. Jemison, Jr., rebel M.C.
- Wm. G. Jones, ex-U.S. district judge
- Wade Keyes, rebel attorney general
- David P. Lewis, rebel M.C.
- Thomas McElderry, rebel colonel and former State Representative
- John T. Morgan, rebel brigadier general
- Y.M. Moody, rebel brigadier general
- Thomas B. Mills, resigned his commission in U.S. navy
- E.W. Pettus, rebel brigadier general
- James L. Pugh, resigned his seat in the U.S. Congress
- P.D. Roddy [sic], rebel brigadier general
- John G. Shorter, ex-governor of Alabama
- C.L. Sayre, ex-officer United States Marine Corps.
- W.R. Smith, rebel M.C.
- P.A. Watts [sic], ex-governor of Alabama
- S.A.M. Wood, rebel brigadier general

Tennessee

- S.R. Anderson, rebel major general
- J.D.C. Atkins, rebel congressman
- A.S. Colyer [sic], rebel congressman
- R.L. Caruthers, rebel congressman
- James W. McCallum, rebel congressman
- M.A. Haynes, ex-U.S. army
- G.A. Henry, rebel senator
- George A. Howard, ex-U.S. Naval Academy
- John P. Murray, rebel congressman
- A.E. Jackson, rebel brigadier general
- Thomas Meeness [sic], rebel congressman
- Geo. Maney, rebel brigadier general
- J.B. Palmer, rebel brigadier general
- Gideon J. Pillow, rebel brigadier general
- C.W. Bell, rebel congressman
- John L.T. Sneed, rebel congressman

In the list the designation "M.C." meant "member of Congress", though this sometimes referred to a state legislature rather than the Confederate Congress. A further list of names was sent by the President to the House on December 4, 1867.

In a final proclamation on December 25, 1868, Johnson declared "unconditionally, and without reservation, ... a full pardon and amnesty for the offence of treason against the United States, or of adhering to their enemies during the late civil war, with restoration of all rights, privileges, and immunities under the Constitution and the laws ..."

== See also ==
- List of people pardoned or granted clemency by the president of the United States
- Confederate oath of allegiance
- Oh we'll hang Jeff Davis from a sour apple tree
