= Cabinet of the Confederate States of America =

Advisory body to the president of the Confederate States

Cabinet of the Confederate States
- Cabinet of Jefferson Davis
- Seal of the Confederate States

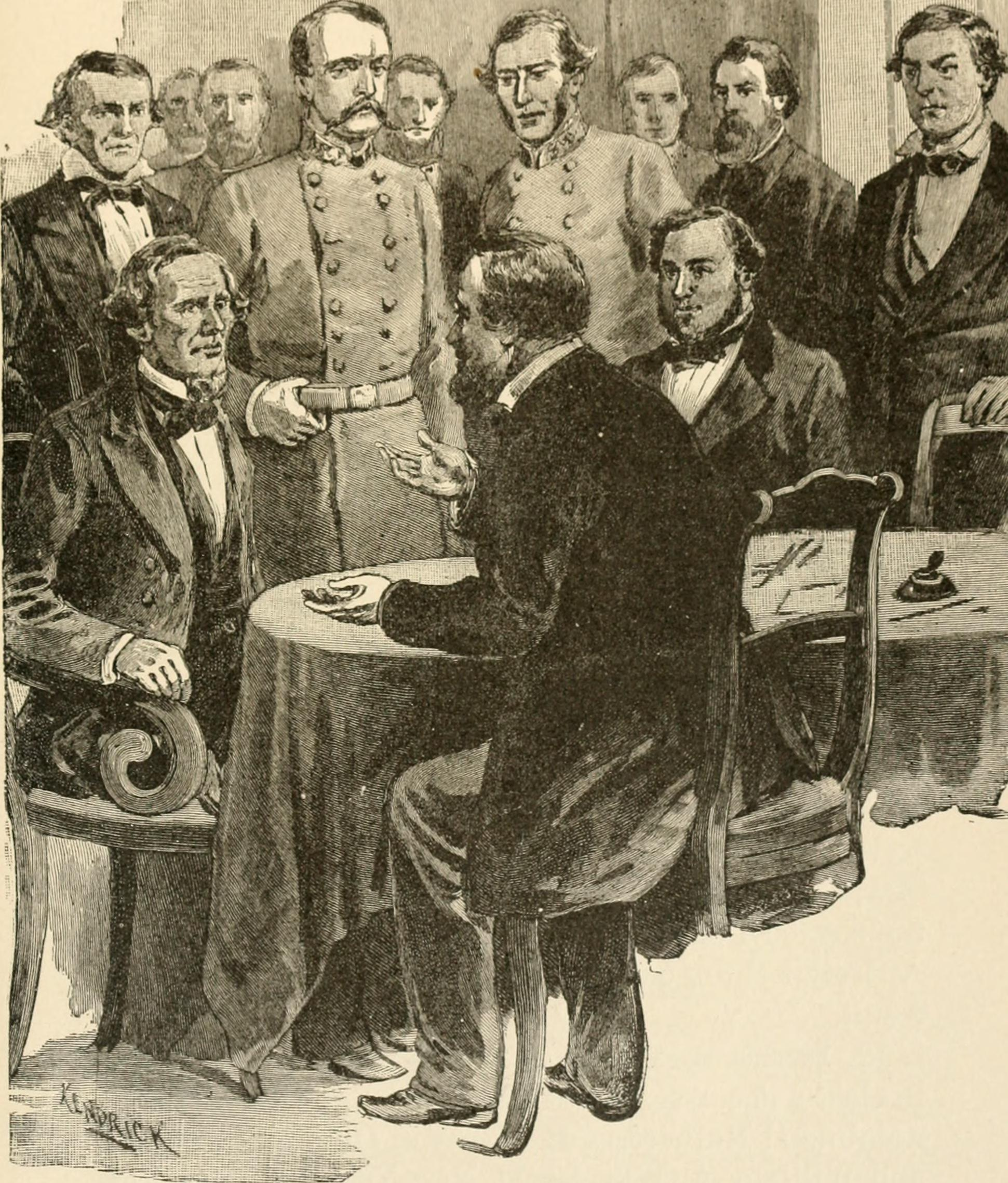
- Last meeting of the Confederate cabinet

Cabinet overview
- Formed: February 18, 1861
- Dissolved: May 10, 1865
- Type: Advisory body
- Employees: 7 members: 1 Vice-president; 6 Principal officers
- Cabinet executives: Jefferson Davis, president of the Confederate States (chairman); Alexander H. Stephens, vice-president of the Confederate States

The Cabinet of the Confederate States of America, commonly called the Confederate cabinet or Cabinet of Jefferson Davis, was part of the executive branch of the federal government of the Confederate States that existed between 1861 and 1865. The members of the Cabinet were the vice president and heads of the federal executive departments.

Office	Name	Term
President	Jefferson Davis	1861–65
Vice President	Alexander H. Stephens	1861–65
Secretary of State	Robert Toombs	1861
Robert M.T. Hunter	1861–62
Judah P. Benjamin	1862–65
Secretary of the Treasury	Christopher Memminger	1861–64
George Trenholm	1864–65
John H. Reagan	1865
Secretary of War	Leroy Pope Walker	1861
Judah P. Benjamin	1861–62
George W. Randolph	1862
James Seddon	1862–65
John C. Breckinridge	1865
Secretary of the Navy	Stephen Mallory	1861–65
Postmaster General	John H. Reagan	1861–65
Attorney General	Judah P. Benjamin	1861
Thomas Bragg	1861–62
Thomas H. Watts	1862–63
George Davis	1864–65

== History ==
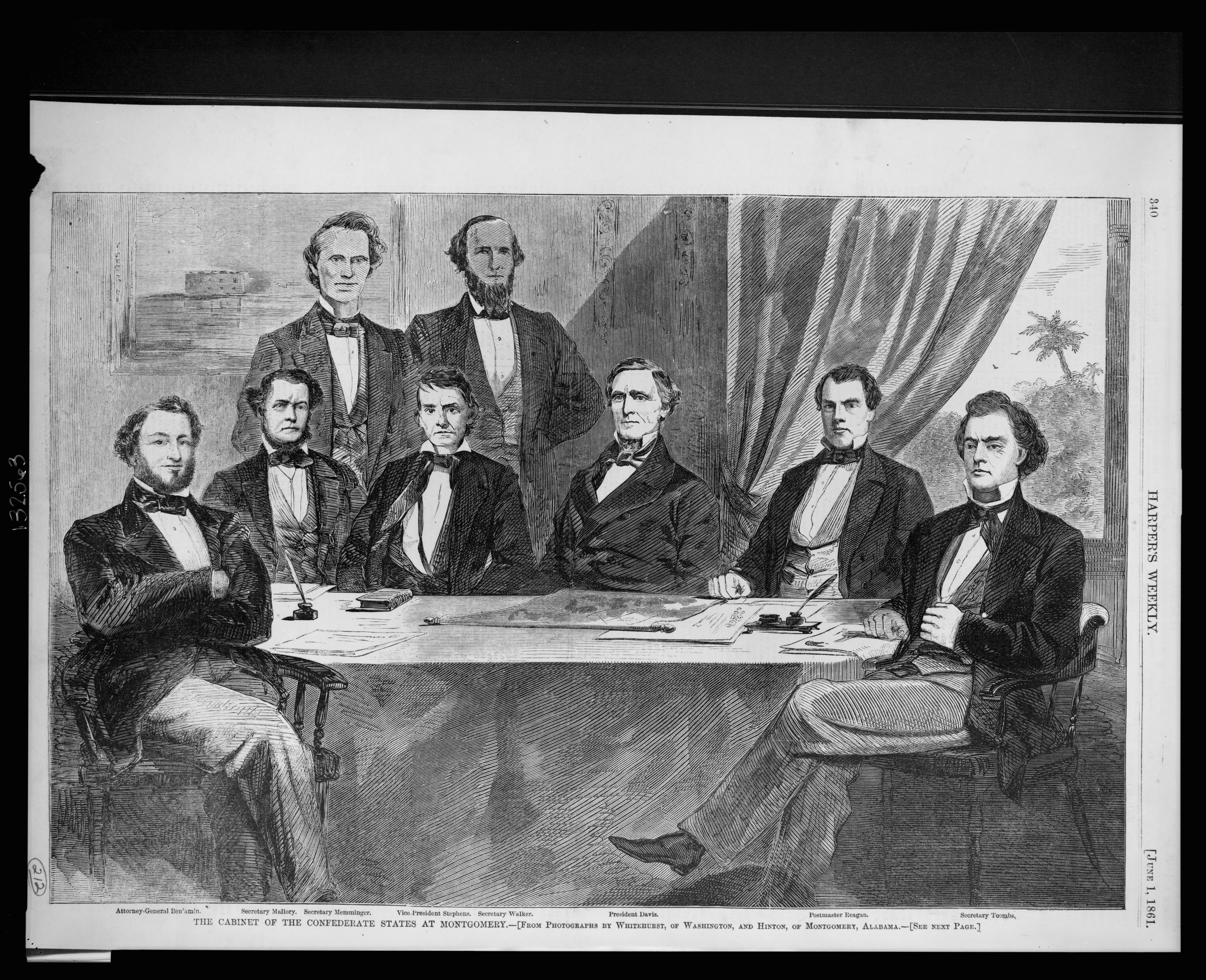
President Davis' first cabinet (1861)

The cabinet was largely modeled on the Cabinet of the United States, with its members overseeing a State Department, Treasury Department, War Department, and Post Office Department. However, unlike the Union, the Confederacy lacked a Department of the Interior, and created a Justice Department (the position of U.S. Attorney General existed, but the U.S. Department of Justice was only created in 1870, after the end of the Civil War).

The Confederate cabinet was ineffective. Like the Confederate Congress, its membership was undistinguished, in contrast with Lincoln's Cabinet, which included highly talented men. Confederate President Jefferson Davis made many of his initial selections to the Cabinet on the basis of political considerations; his choices "Were dictated by the need to assure the various states that their interests were being represented in the government." Moreover, much Confederate talent went into the military rather than the Cabinet, and the cabinet suffered from frequent turnover and reshuffling. Sixteen different men served in the six Cabinet posts during the four years of the Confederacy's existence. The most talented—but also the most unpopular—member of the Cabinet was Judah P. Benjamin. Among the weakest cabinet secretaries was Treasury Secretary Christopher Memminger, who had little experience with fiscal policy; Memminger was placed at the Treasury by Davis due to the influence of South Carolinians, because Memminger had been an influential supporter of that state's secession. Civil War historian Allen C. Guelzo describes the first Confederate secretaries of war and state, LeRoy Pope Walker of Alabama and Robert Toombs of Georgia, respectively—as "brainless political appointees."

The cabinet's performance suffered due to Davis's inability to delegate and propensity to micromanage his Cabinet officers. Davis consulted with the Cabinet frequently—meeting with individual cabinet secretaries almost every day and convening meetings of the full Cabinet two or three times a week—but these meetings, which could stretch to five hours or more, "rarely saw anything accomplished." Secretary of the Navy Stephen Mallory lamented that "From [Davis's] uncontrollable tendency to digression," cabinet meetings "consumed four or five hours without determining anything." Many of the cabinet members became frustrated, especially the secretaries of war; after concluding "that they could not get along with Davis's constant interference and micromanagement," many resigned. Nine of the eleven Confederate states "had representation in the Cabinet at some point during the life of Confederacy"; only Tennessee and Arkansas never had a Confederate cabinet secretary.

The final meeting of the Confederate cabinet took place in Fort Mill, South Carolina, amid the collapse of the Confederacy. Fort Mill was the only place where the full Confederate cabinet met after the fall of Richmond.

== Cabinet ==
Office	Image	Name	Home state	Dates
Vice President		Alexander H. Stephens	Georgia	February 18, 1861 – May 11, 1865
Secretary of State		Robert Toombs	Georgia	February 25, 1861 – July 25, 1861
Secretary of State		Robert M. T. Hunter	Virginia	July 25, 1861 – February 18, 1862
Secretary of State		William M. Browne	Georgia	February 18, 1862 – March 18, 1862
Secretary of State		Judah P. Benjamin	Louisiana	March 18, 1862 – May 10, 1865
Secretary of the Treasury		Christopher Memminger	South Carolina	February 25, 1861 – July 18, 1864
Secretary of the Treasury		George Trenholm	South Carolina	July 18, 1864 – April 27, 1865
Secretary of the Treasury		John H. Reagan	Texas	April 27, 1865 – May 10, 1865
Secretary of War		LeRoy Pope Walker	Alabama	February 25, 1861 – September 16, 1861
Secretary of War		Judah P. Benjamin	Louisiana	September 17, 1861 – March 24, 1862
Secretary of War		George W. Randolph	Virginia	March 24, 1862 – November 15, 1862
Secretary of War		James Seddon	Virginia	November 21, 1862 – February 5, 1865
Secretary of War		Major-General; John C. Breckinridge	Kentucky	February 6, 1865 – May 10, 1865
Secretary of the Navy		Stephen Mallory	Florida	March 4, 1861 – May 2, 1865
Postmaster-General		John H. Reagan	Texas	March 6, 1861 – May 10, 1865
Attorney-General		Judah P. Benjamin	Louisiana	February 25, 1861 – September 17, 1861
Attorney-General		Wade Keyes	Alabama	September 17, 1861 – November 21, 1861
Attorney-General		Thomas Bragg	North Carolina	November 21, 1861 – March 18, 1862
Attorney-General		Thomas H. Watts	Alabama	March 18, 1862 – October 1, 1863
Attorney-General		Wade Keyes	Alabama	October 1, 1863 – January 2, 1864
Attorney-General		George Davis	North Carolina	January 2, 1864 – April 24, 1865

== See also ==
- Rufus Randolph Rhodes – the only head of the Confederate Patent Office
