= 1863 Alabama gubernatorial election =

- August 3, 1863
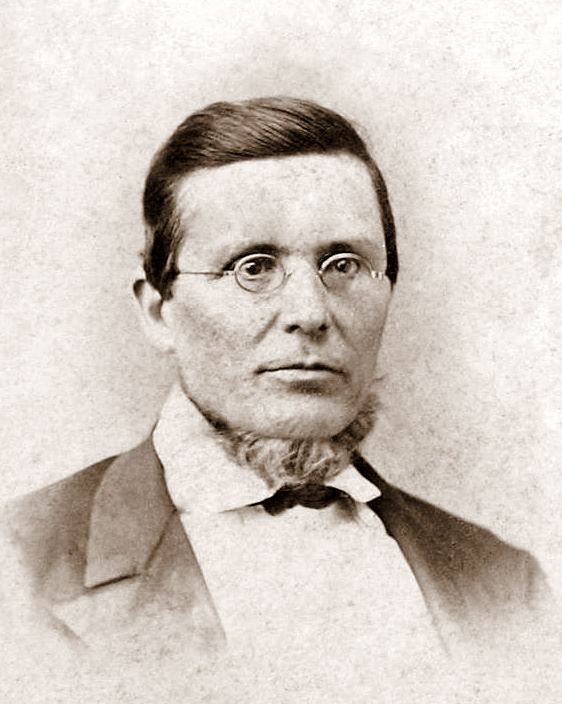

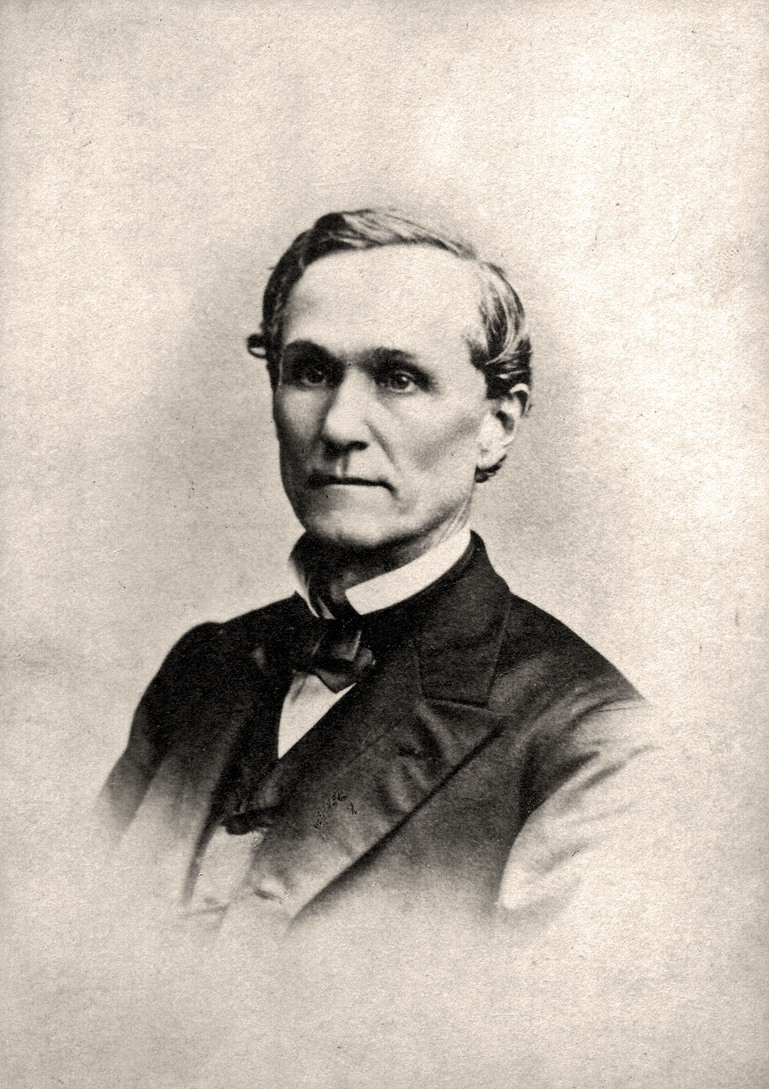
Nominee	Thomas Hill Watts	John Gill Shorter
Party	Whig	Democratic
Popular vote	28,221	9,664
Percentage	71.71%	24.56%
- County results Watts: 50-60% 60-70% 70-80% 80-90% >90% Shorter: 50-60% 60-70% 70-80% >90% Returns Rejected
Governor before election
John Gill Shorter
Democratic
Elected Governor
Thomas Hill Watts
Whig

The 1863 Alabama gubernatorial election took place on August 3, 1863 during the American Civil War in order to elect the governor of Alabama. Whig Thomas Hill Watts won his first term as governor.

== Background ==
Watts and Shorter had faced each other before in the prior 1861 election, and the fervent secessionist Shorter won easily while enthusiasm for the American Civil War was still high. However, as the war progressed, the economic and military situation deteriorated rapidly, with local anti-Confederate rebellions breaking out across the state, and many civilians facing destitution. Under these conditions, Shorter was defeated in his bid for reelection.

== Candidates ==
=== Whig Party ===
- Thomas H. Watts, 3rd Confederate States Attorney General

=== Democratic Party ===
- John Gill Shorter, Deputy from Alabama to the Provisional Congress of the Confederate States; incumbent 17th Governor of Alabama
- James F. Dowdell, member of the House of Representatives from Alabama, 1853–1859; colonel in the Confederate Army

== Election ==
=== Statewide ===
1863 Alabama gubernatorial election
Party	Candidate	Votes	%	±%
Whig	Thomas Hill Watts	28,221	71.71	+29.08
Democratic	John Gill Shorter	9,664	24.56	−32.81
Democratic	James F. Dowdell	1,371	3.74	+3.74
Total votes		39,256	100.00	
Whig gain from Democratic				
