= John Urquhart =

John Urquhart may refer to:

- John Urquhart (Canadian politician) (1844–1933), mayor of Oakville, Ontario, Canada
- John Urquhart (sheriff) (born 1947), Sheriff of King County, Washington
- John Urquhart (Washington politician) (1860–1925), American politician
- John Urquhart (cricketer) (1921–2003), English cricketer
- Johnny Urquhart (1925–2008), Scottish footballer

== See also ==
- John Urquhart Shorter (1844–1904), Confederate veteran and attorney
- John Urquhart Cameron (born 1943), academic and social reformer
