= John Shorter =

John Shorter may refer to:

- John Gill Shorter (1818–1872), 17th Governor of Alabama from 1861 to 1863
- John Urquhart Shorter (1844–1904), Confederate officer, lawyer, poet; nephew of the above
- John Shorter Pty Ltd, former Australian manufacturing import company, founded in 1884
- Sir John Shorter, Lord Mayor of London in 1687

== See also ==
- John Shorter Stevens
