= Mooresville, Alabama =

- Town
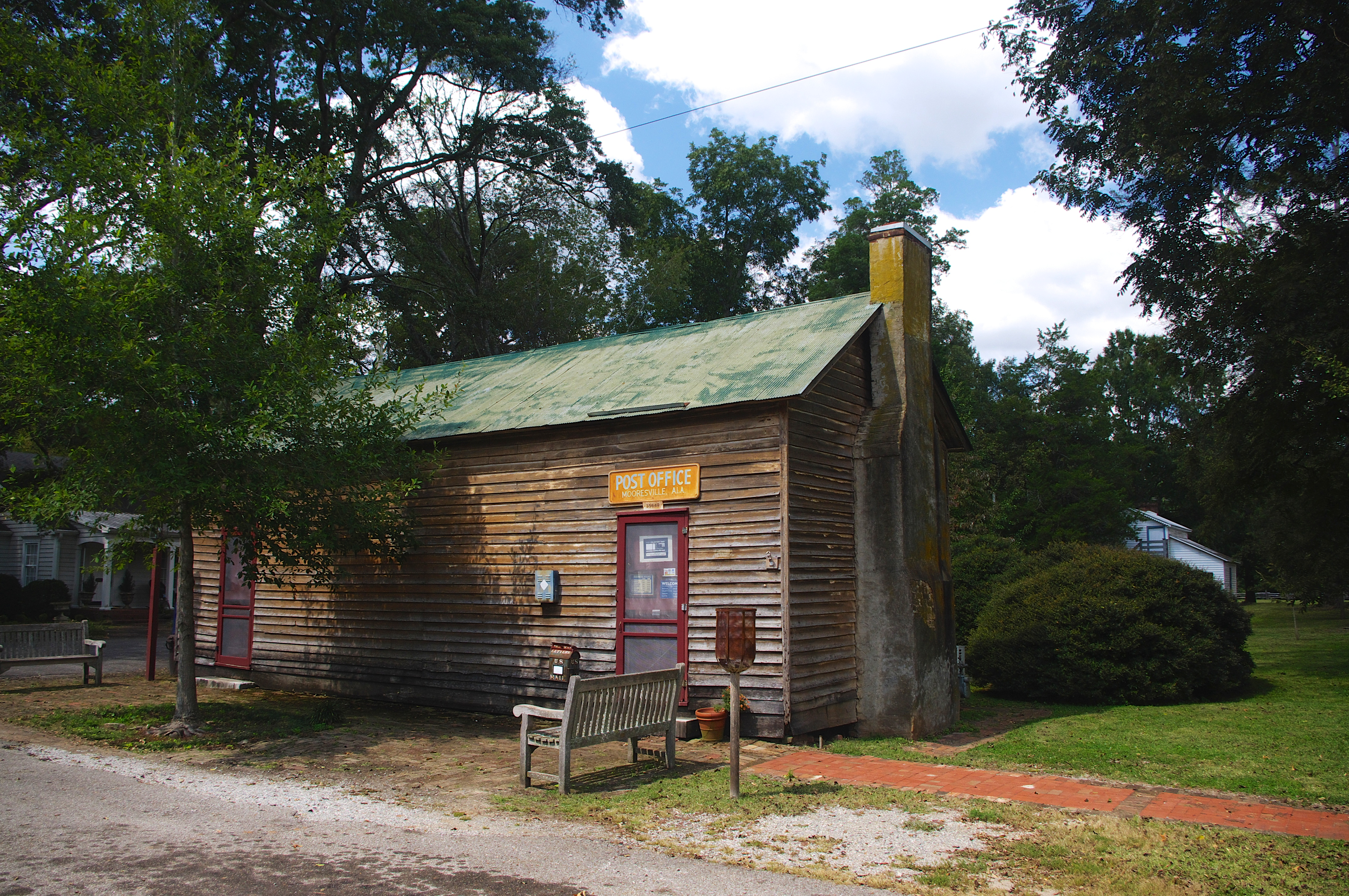
- Mooresville Post Office

- Location of Mooresville in Limestone County, Alabama.
- Coordinates: 34°37′27″N 86°52′48″W
- Country: United States
- State: Alabama
- County: Limestone
- Town of Mooresville: November 16, 1818

Area
  - Total: 0.30 sq mi (0.77 km^{2})
  - Land: 0.25 sq mi (0.65 km^{2})
  - Water: 0.050 sq mi (0.13 km^{2})
- Elevation: 577 ft (176 m)

Population (2020)
  - Total: 47
  - Density: 188.3/sq mi (72.72/km^{2})
- Time zone: UTC-6 (Central (CST))
  - Summer (DST): UTC-5 (CDT)
- ZIP code: 35649
- Area code: 256
- FIPS code: 01-51264
- GNIS feature ID: 2406188
- Website: www.mooresvilleal.com

Mooresville is a town in Limestone County, Alabama, United States, located southeast of the intersection of Interstate 565 and Interstate 65, and north of Wheeler Lake.

The town is between Huntsville and Decatur, and is part of the Huntsville-Decatur Combined Statistical Area; as of the 2020 census, Mooresville had a population of 47.

Although the town's per-capita income is over $50,000, Mooresville is within the area covered by the charter for the Appalachian Regional Commission, an organization whose goal is to help increase the per-capita income of impoverished areas. Mooresville is within Corridor V of the Appalachian Development Highway System.

The town was the primary filming location for Disney's live action production of Tom and Huck (1995).

== History ==
Mooresville is one of the oldest incorporated towns in Alabama, having been incorporated on November 16, 1818, when Alabama was still a Territory. It was named for early settlers, Robert and William Moore who located on land which became the site of Mooresville. Andrew Johnson, later to become to 17th president of the United States, lived in Mooresville as an apprentice tailor when he was a young man. The Union Army occupied Mooresville several times during the Civil War, and a few skirmishes were fought in the vicinity. Future U.S. president James Garfield, then a Union general camped in the area, delivered a sermon at the Mooresville Church of Christ in 1863. Mooresville thrived as a cotton farming hub until the early 20th century, when the boll weevil infestation wrecked the cotton economy.

The entire town, described as a picturesque early 19th century village, is listed on the National Register of Historic Places. Many of the older public buildings, including the Stagecoach Inn and Tavern, the Brick Church, the Post Office, and the Church of Christ, are owned and maintained by the town's residents.

=== Historic buildings ===
- Stagecoach Inn and Tavern (1820s) – a frame building constructed before 1825 that served as an inn and post office. This building was documented by the Historic American Buildings Survey in the 1930s, and underwent extensive restoration in the 1990s.
- Mooresville Post Office (1840) – located at the corner of Lauderdale and High streets, this post office is the oldest in operation in Alabama and has call boxes dating before the American Civil War. Some of the call boxes have been owned by the same families since before the Civil War. The call boxes and some of the office furnishings actually predate the building, having been used in the nearby Stagecoach Inn and Tavern.
- Brick Church (1839) – a Greek Revival-style church built of handmade bricks that stands on Lauderdale Street. Originally a Presbyterian church, it later served as a Methodist church and a Baptist mission. The church's recessed entrance is supported by two stucco-covered columns.
- Mooresville Church of Christ (1854) – a white clapboard church on Market Street that originally served as a meeting house for the Disciples of Christ. The rear wing and entry vestibule were added in 1937.

== Geography ==
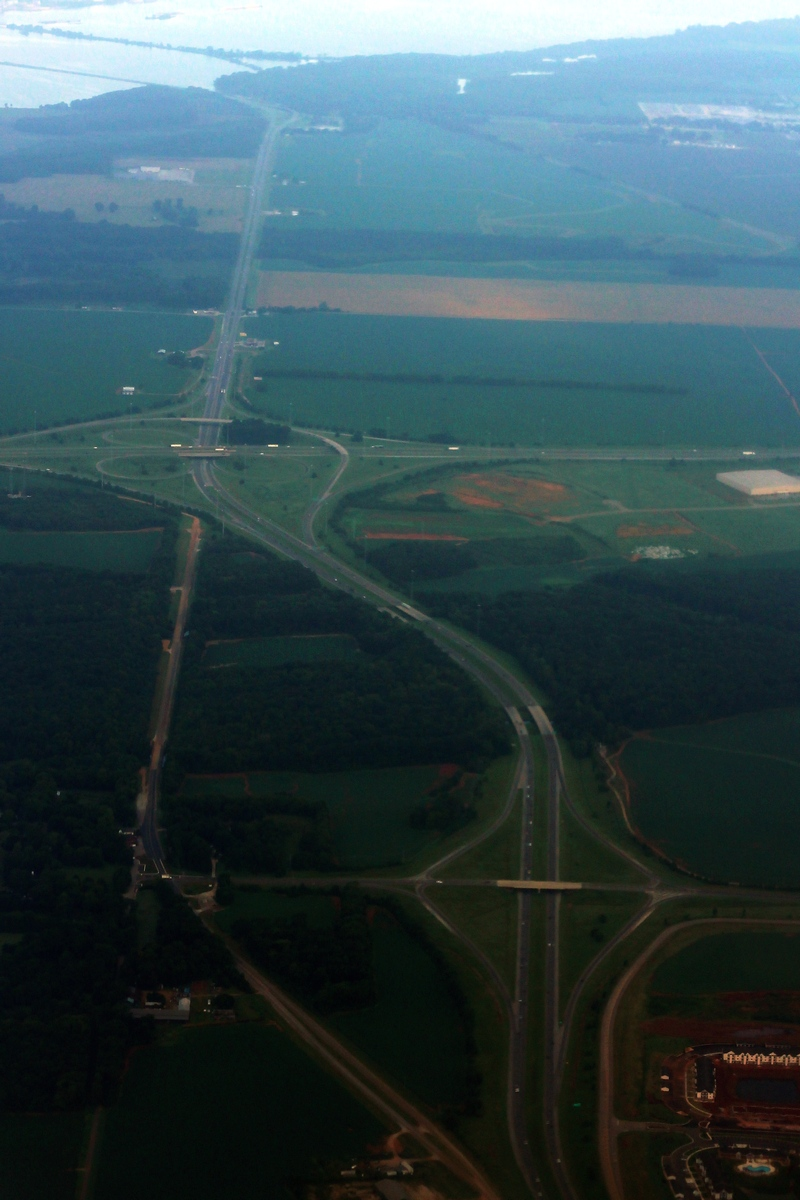
Aerial photograph of Interstate 565 bypassing the town. The brownish road connecting Mooresville is Old Alabama Highway 20

Mooresville is located southwest of Huntsville and northeast of Decatur in southern Limestone County. Wheeler Lake, an artificial reservoir along the Tennessee River, lies to the south.

According to the U.S. Census Bureau, the town has a total area of 0.1 square miles (0.26 km^{2}), all land.

== Demographics ==
Historical population
Census	Pop.	Note	%±
1870	165		—
1880	183		10.9%
1890	143		−21.9%
1900	150		4.9%
1910	137		−8.7%
1920	144		5.1%
1930	114		−20.8%
1940	129		13.2%
1950	101		−21.7%
1960	93		−7.9%
1970	72		−22.6%
1980	58		−19.4%
1990	54		−6.9%
2000	59		9.3%
2010	53		−10.2%
2020	47		−11.3%
U.S. Decennial Census

As of the census of 2000, 59 people, 24 households, and 19 families resided in the town. The population density was 741.1 inhabitants per square mile (286.1/km^{2}). There were 28 housing units at an average density of 351.7 per square mile (135.8/km^{2}). The racial makeup was 88.14% White and 11.86% Black or African American.

There were 24 households, of which 25.0% had children under 18 living with them; 66.7% were married couples living together; 12.5% had a female householder with no husband present; and 20.8% were non-families. 20.8% of all households were made up of individuals, and 12.5% had someone living alone who was 65 years of age or older. The average household size was 2.46 and the average family size was 2.84.

In the town, the population was spread out, with 16.9% under the age of 18, 6.8% from 18 to 24, 20.3% from 25 to 44, 40.7% from 45 to 64, and 15.3% who were 65 years of age or older. The median age was 50 years. For every 100 females, there were 118.5 males. For every 100 females age 18 and over, there were 104.2 males.

The median income for a household in the town was $54,167, and the median income for a family was $136,039. Males had a median income of $51,667 versus $65,417 for females. The per capita income for the town was $51,694, unusually high for the state. No families and 4.3% of the population are living below the poverty line, including 3.33% of those over 64.

== Education ==
It is in the Limestone County School District.

== Notable people ==
- Wade Keyes, Confederate States Attorney General in 1861, and from 1863 to 1864
- James Sloss, planter, industrialist, and founder of Sloss Furnaces

== Gallery ==
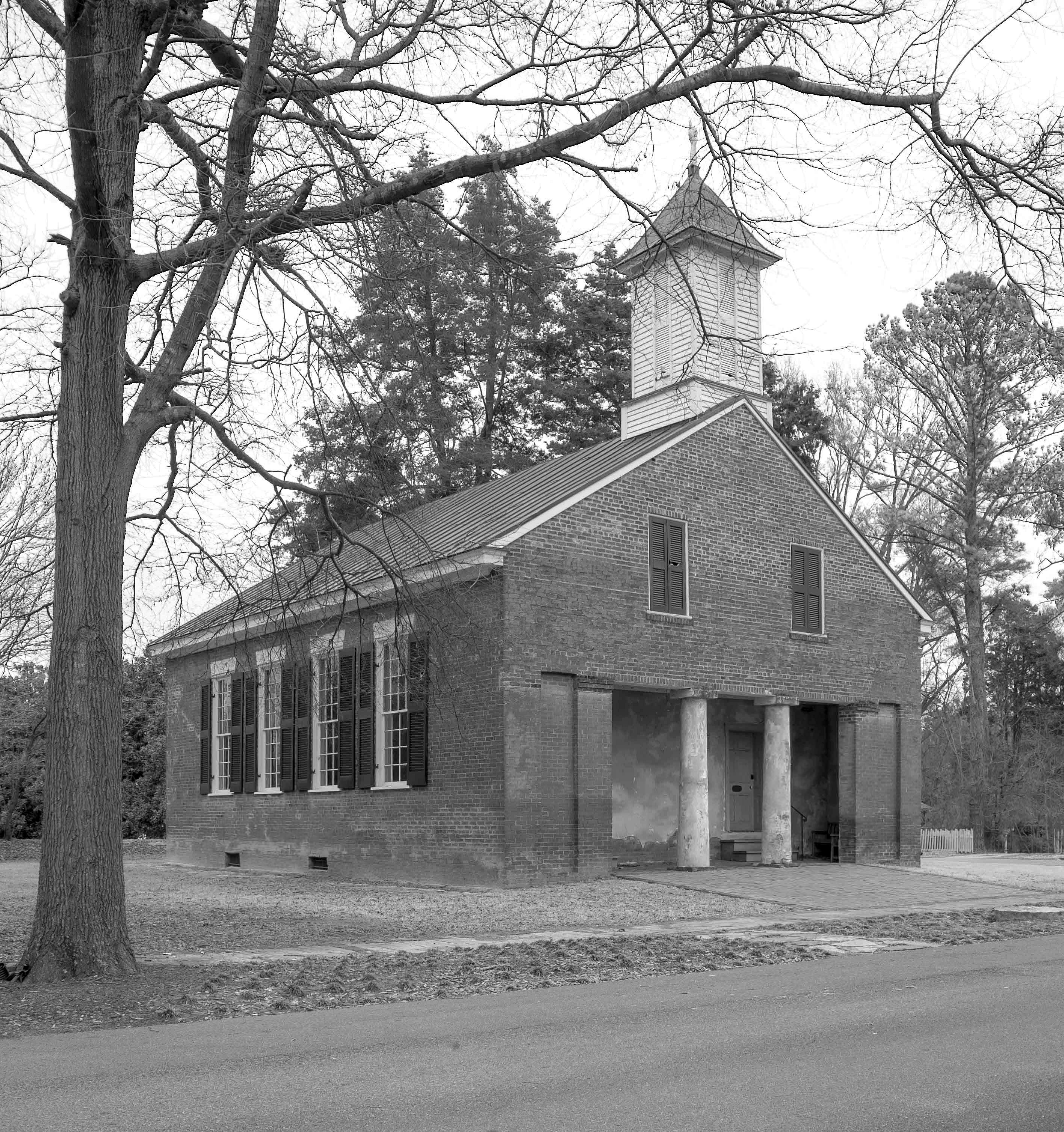
Old Brick Church in Mooresville

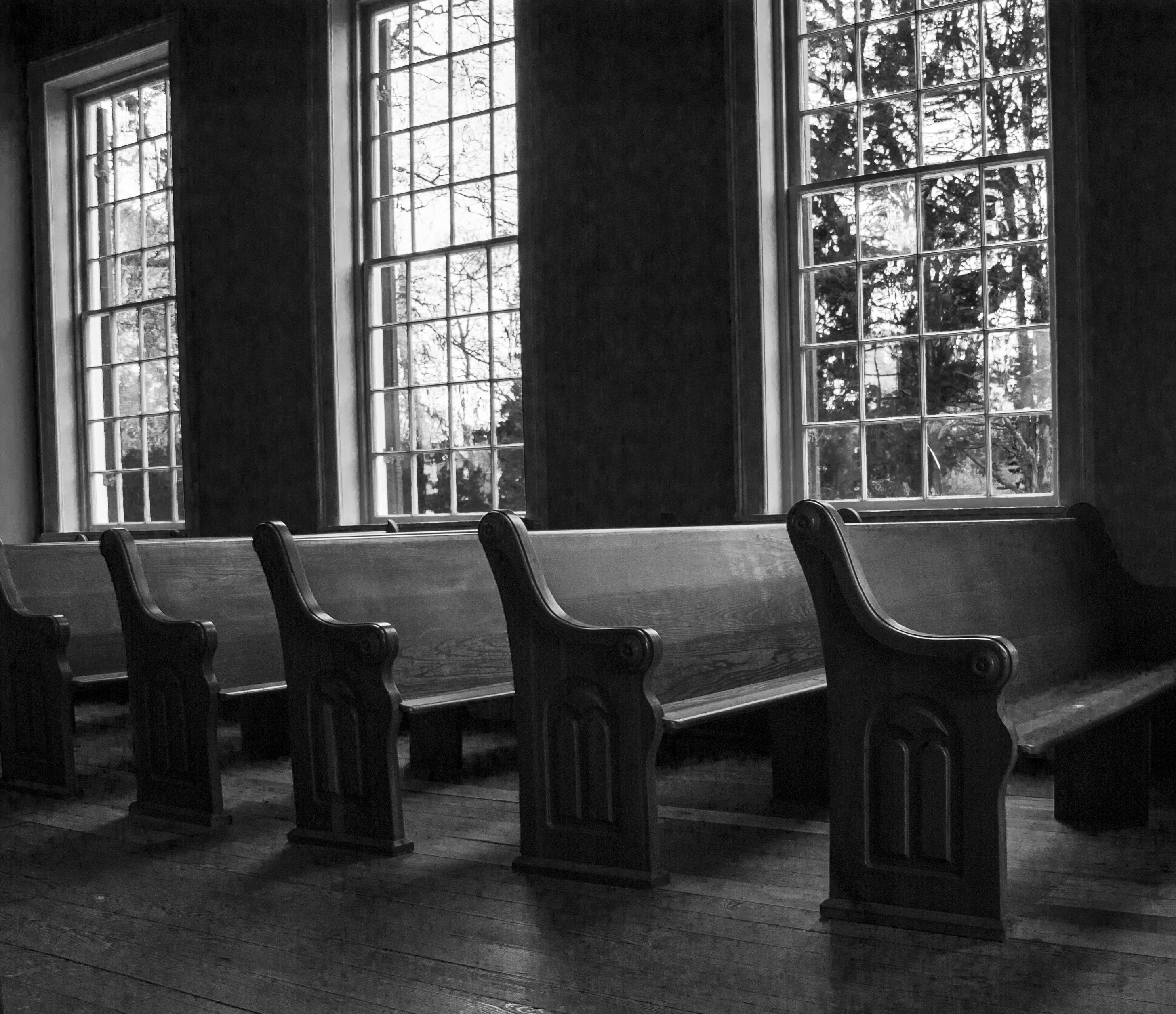
Pews in Old Brick Church
