= 1861 Alabama gubernatorial election =

- August 5, 1861
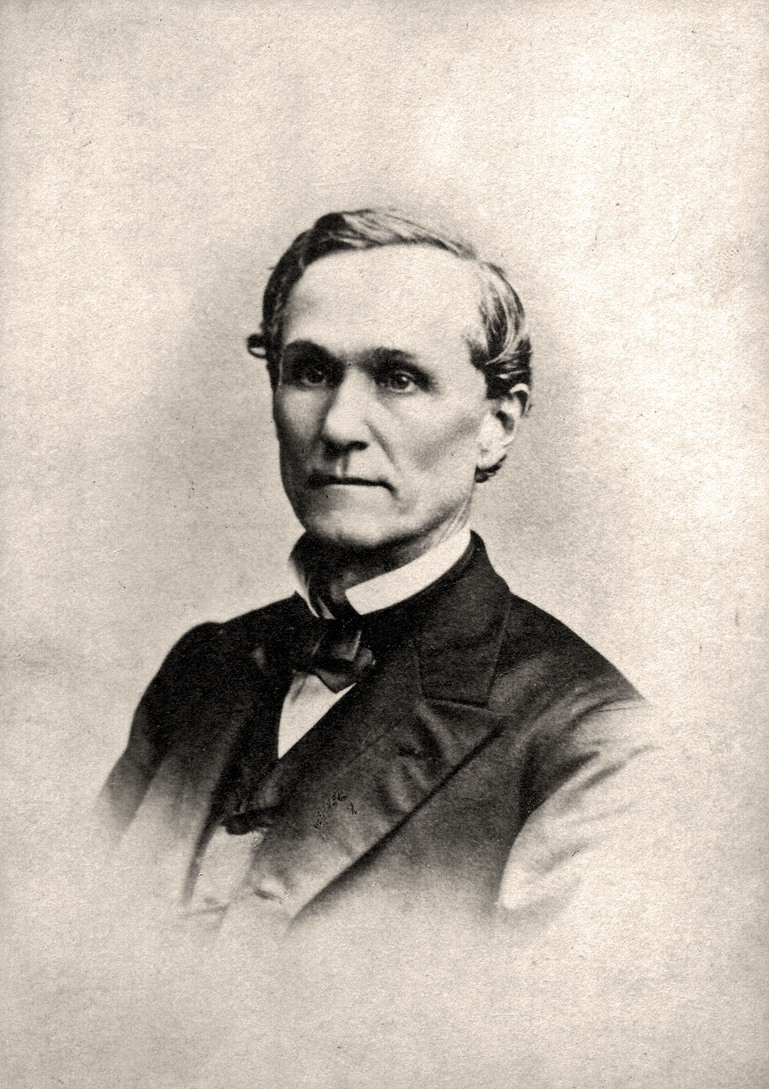

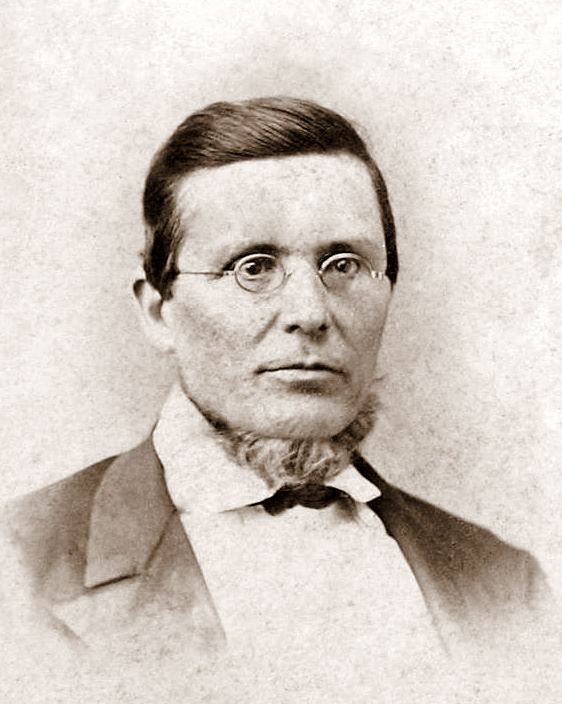
Nominee	John Gill Shorter	Thomas H. Watts
Party	Democratic	Whig
Popular vote	37,849	28,127
Percentage	57.37%	42.63%
- County results Shorter: 50–60% 60–70% 70–80% 80–90% >90% Watts: 50–60% 60–70% 70–80% 80–90% Unknown/no vote
Governor before election
Andrew B. Moore
Democratic
Elected Governor
John Gill Shorter
Democratic

The 1861 Alabama gubernatorial election took place on August 5, 1861, in order to elect the governor of Alabama. Democrat John Gill Shorter won his first term as governor.

== Candidates ==
=== Democratic Party ===
- John Gill Shorter, deputy from Alabama to the Provisional Congress of the Confederate States

=== Whig Party ===
- Thomas H. Watts, 3rd Confederate States Attorney General

== Election ==
=== Statewide ===
Alabama gubernatorial election, 1861
Party	Candidate	Votes	%
Democratic	John Gill Shorter	37,849	57.37%
Whig	Thomas H. Watts	28,127	42.63%
Total votes		65,976	100.00
Democratic hold			
