= John Urquhart Shorter =

American attorney and Confederate veteran (1844–1904)

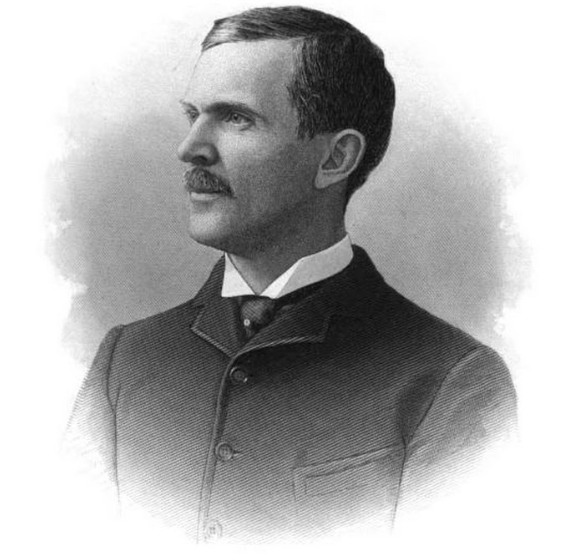
Likeness and signature, 1891.

John Urquhart Shorter (1844–1904) was a Confederate officer, lawyer, poet and for twelve years first assistant district attorney of Kings County, New York.

== Early life ==
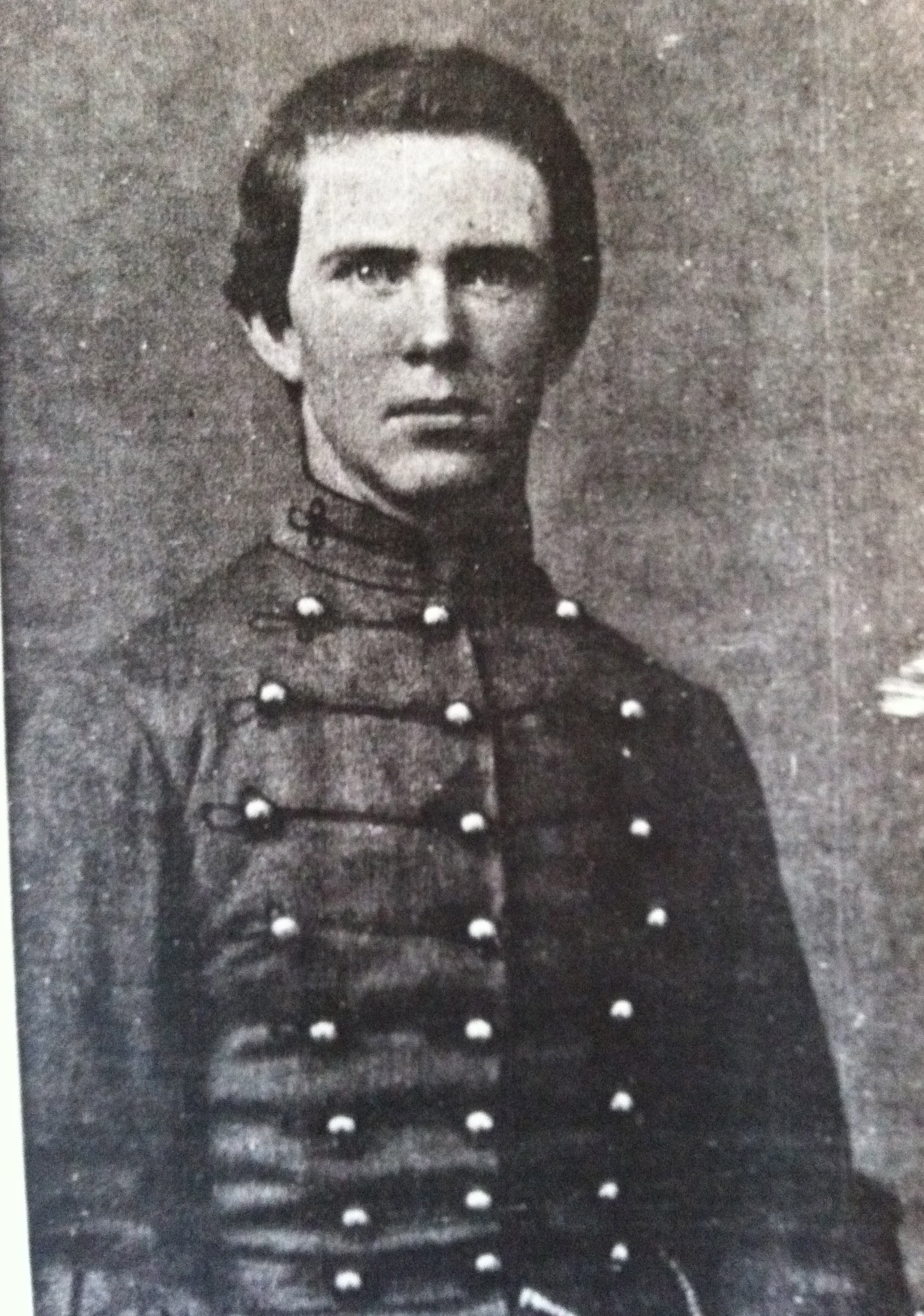
Shorter in uniform, c. 1864.

John U. Shorter was born in Russell County, Alabama, on January 9, 1844. He came from a distinguished Southern lineage. His grandfather was Eli S. Shorter of Columbus, Georgia, where John U. Shorter spent his boyhood and youth. He studied law with his uncle, John Gill Shorter, the Civil War governor of Alabama.

== Civil War ==
The American Civil War broke out while he was engaged in the study of law and he joined his father in the Confederate Army of Virginia, remaining in service for some months. He then entered the corps of cadets at the University of Alabama. After a year spent here he was detailed as instructor of tactics at the camp of instruction located at Talladega, Alabama. From here he entered active service as adjutant of the 31st Alabama Infantry Regiment in 1862. He was still a teenager when he received his commission, but did well on the field of battle, serving with credit around Vicksburg before the siege of that city.

He was taken prisoner and passed some time in the officer prison on Johnson's Island at Sandusky, Ohio. After the war he taught school for a time at Bainbridge, Georgia, continuing the study of the law he had begun while in the Federal prison. Later he continued his studies In the office of his uncle, Governor Shorter, at Eufala, Alabama, from which place he was admitted to practice.

== New York ==
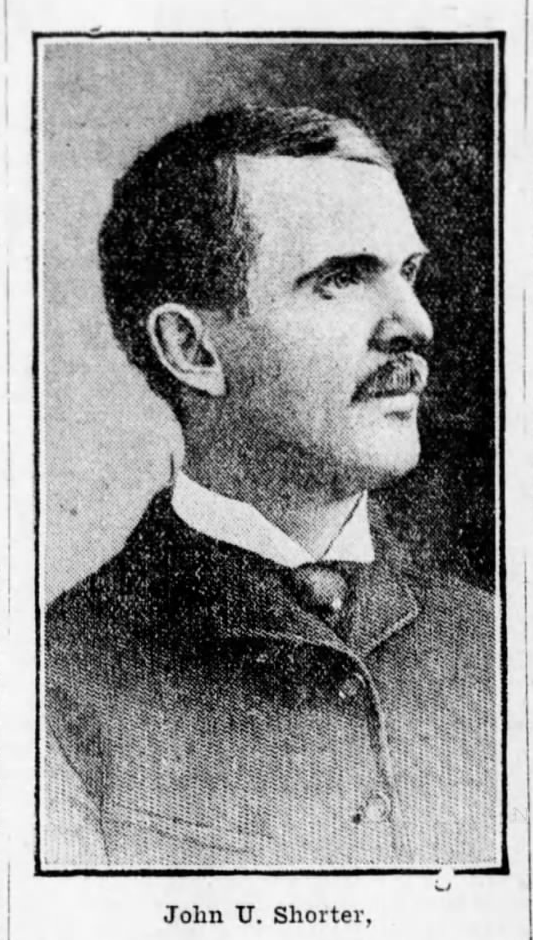
Portrait from his cited obituary in the Brooklyn Eagle, March 14, 1904.

In 1870 he came to Brooklyn and for thirty years was a well known figure at the bar of Kings County. He was associated for a time with Howe & Hummel of New York, later on joining fortunes with James W. Ridgway. When the latter was elected district attorney of Kings County in 1883 he appointed his law partner as his first assistant, which post was held by Shorter until 1895, when he retired to private practice. He was made an honorary member of the 139th Regiment Veterans Association a few years before his death, a distinction he alone held as a Southern soldier.

== Death ==
He died at the Seney Hospital on March 13, 1904, at 5 o'clock in the afternoon after a two days illness. He was sixty years old. Heart disease was assigned as the cause of death. Shorter had not been in the best of health for a month before, but his illness did not take a serious turn until Wednesday of the week before, when his physician advised him to go to a hospital for treatment. He had just returned from a trip to the South for the benefit of his health when matters took a turn for the worse. He seemed to be holding his own while at the hospital and his death came unexpectedly.

== Personal life ==
He left a wife and one daughter, Laura Dean Shorter, who was an actress and played under the name of Laura de Nio. At the time of her father's death she was a member of the cast in An English Daisy, then playing at Baltimore.

== Legacy ==
Shorter had achieved a considerable local reputation as a poet, many contributions from his pen having been published in the Eagle. At the time of his death his widow had In her possession the typewritten manuscript of a number of his poems. The following is one of the last published. It Is entitled "Pegasus":

Have patience, poet, do not think
In one short hour you can drink
From springs Pierian such a draught
As makes you king among your craft,
The poem that is read for years
Is wrought in sorrow, pain and tears.

See how the architect, with aid
Of many thousand hands, hath made,
Our mighty structures, till on high
They seem to brace the bending sky,
Complete at last, though long delayed,
For one by one each stone was laid.

See here a painting Titian wrought,
No sudden sweep of brush had caught
The varied lights and shades it shows,
Where every color burns and glows,
The fleeting years were all too short
To give perfection to his art.

Behold the Forty Pyramids, the Sphinx,
Against whose dark and gloomy forms
Old Egypt, for five thousand years,
Had vainly spent her blinding storms.
These mysteries of mysteries,
All were the work of centuries.

A hundred times Pygmalion
His Galatea carved in stone,
Until beneath his wondrous knife
The gods, beholding, gave it life.
Remember, 'ere you write your song,
That life is short and art is long.
