= Thomas Bragg =

American politician (1810–1872)

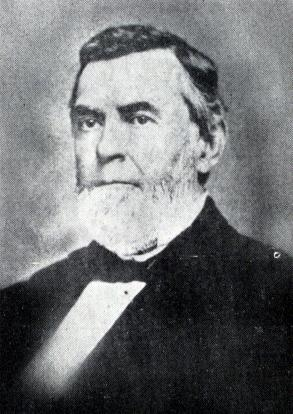

2nd Confederate States Attorney General
- In office November 21, 1861 – March 18, 1862
- President: Jefferson Davis
- Preceded by: Wade Keyes (Acting)
- Succeeded by: Thomas Watts

United States Senator from North Carolina
- In office March 4, 1859 – March 8, 1861
- Preceded by: David Reid
- Succeeded by: Joseph Abbott (1868)

34th Governor of North Carolina
- In office January 1, 1855 – January 1, 1859
- Preceded by: Warren Winslow
- Succeeded by: John Ellis

Member of the North Carolina House of Commons
- In office 1842–1843

Personal details
- Born: November 9, 1810 Warrenton, North Carolina, U.S.
- Died: January 21, 1872 (aged 61) Raleigh, North Carolina, U.S.
- Party: Democratic
- Education: Norwich University

Thomas Bragg (November 9, 1810 – January 21, 1872) was an American politician and lawyer who served as the 34th governor of the U.S. state of North Carolina from 1855 through 1859. During the Civil War, he served in the Confederate States Cabinet. He was the older brother of General Braxton Bragg. They were direct descendants of Thomas Bragg (1579–1665) who was born in England and settled in the Virginia Colony.

== Biography ==
Born in Warrenton, North Carolina, to a middle-class, slaveowning family, Bragg attended Warrenton Academy and later graduated from Captain Partridge's American Literary, Scientific & Military Academy (now known as Norwich University – The Military College of Vermont). He was admitted to the bar in 1833 and commenced practice in Jackson, North Carolina. He was a member of the North Carolina General Assembly from 1842 to 1843 and became the prosecuting attorney for Northampton County. He successfully ran for governor of North Carolina and served from 1855 to 1859. He then took a seat in the United States Senate, serving from 1859 until the start of the Civil War in 1861. He served as chairman of the Committee on Claims in the thirty-sixth congress. He resigned and was expelled for siding with the Confederacy. Confederate President Jefferson Davis appointed Bragg Attorney General of the Confederate States; he served from 1861 until his resignation in 1862. In 1870, Bragg served as special counsel in the impeachment proceedings of Governor William Woods Holden, related to the latter's efforts to curb the influence of the Ku Klux Klan in Reconstruction-era North Carolina. He continued to practice law until his death in 1872, and was also chairman of the central executive committee of the North Carolina Democratic Party (then called the Democratic-Conservative Party) as of 1870. He was interred in Oakwood Cemetery in Raleigh, North Carolina.

His home at Jackson, the Amis-Bragg House, was listed on the National Register of Historic Places in 2003.

== See also ==
- List of United States senators expelled or censured

== Bibliography ==
- Patrick, Rembert W. (1944). Jefferson Davis and His Cabinet. Baton Rouge: Louisiana State University Press. pp. 298–302.

Party political offices
Preceded by David Settle Reid	Democratic nominee for Governor of North Carolina; 1854, 1856	Succeeded by John Willis Ellis
Political offices
Preceded by Warren Winslow	Governor of North Carolina; 1855–1859	Succeeded by John Ellis
U.S. Senate
Preceded by David Reid	United States Senator (Class 2) from North Carolina; 1859–1861; Served alongside: Thomas Lanier Clingman	Vacant Title next held by Joseph Carter Abbott; 1868
Preceded by Alfred Iverson Sr.	Chair of the Senate Claims Committee; 1861	Succeeded by Daniel Clark
Legal offices
Preceded by Wade Keyes; Acting	Confederate States Attorney General; 1861–1862	Succeeded by Thomas Watts
