= John Urquhart (Washington politician) =

American politician

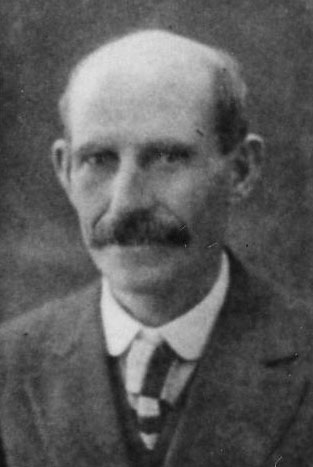
- Urquhart in 1917

Member of the Washington House of Representatives for the 59th district
- In office 1913–1919

Personal details
- Born: 1860 Badentarbet, Sutherlandshire, Scotland
- Died: January 19, 1925 (aged 64–65) Spokane, Washington, United States
- Party: Democratic

John Urquhart (1860 – January 19, 1925) was an American politician in the state of Washington. He served in the Washington House of Representatives.
