= Thomas H. Watts =

American politician (1819–1892)

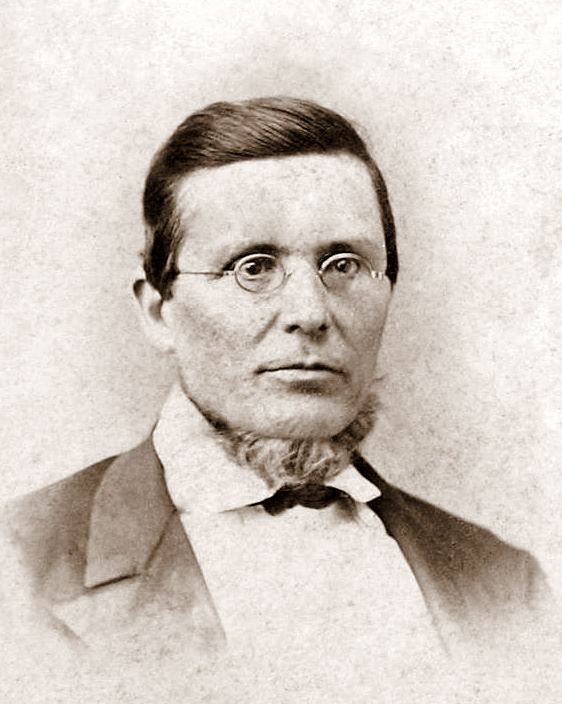

18th Governor of Alabama
- In office December 1, 1863 – May 1, 1865
- Preceded by: John Shorter
- Succeeded by: Lewis Parsons

3rd Confederate States Attorney General
- In office March 18, 1862 – October 1, 1863
- President: Jefferson Davis
- Preceded by: Thomas Bragg
- Succeeded by: Wade Keyes (Acting)

Personal details
- Born: Thomas Hill Watts; January 3, 1819 Pine Flat, Alabama, U.S.
- Died: September 16, 1892 (aged 73) Montgomery, Alabama, U.S.
- Resting place: Oakwood Cemetery (Montgomery, Alabama)
- Party: Whig
- Education: University of Virginia
- Occupation: Lawyer

Military service
- Allegiance: Confederate States of America
- Rank: Colonel
- Commands: 17th Alabama Infantry
- Battles/wars: American Civil War: Siege of Pensacola; Siege of Corinth

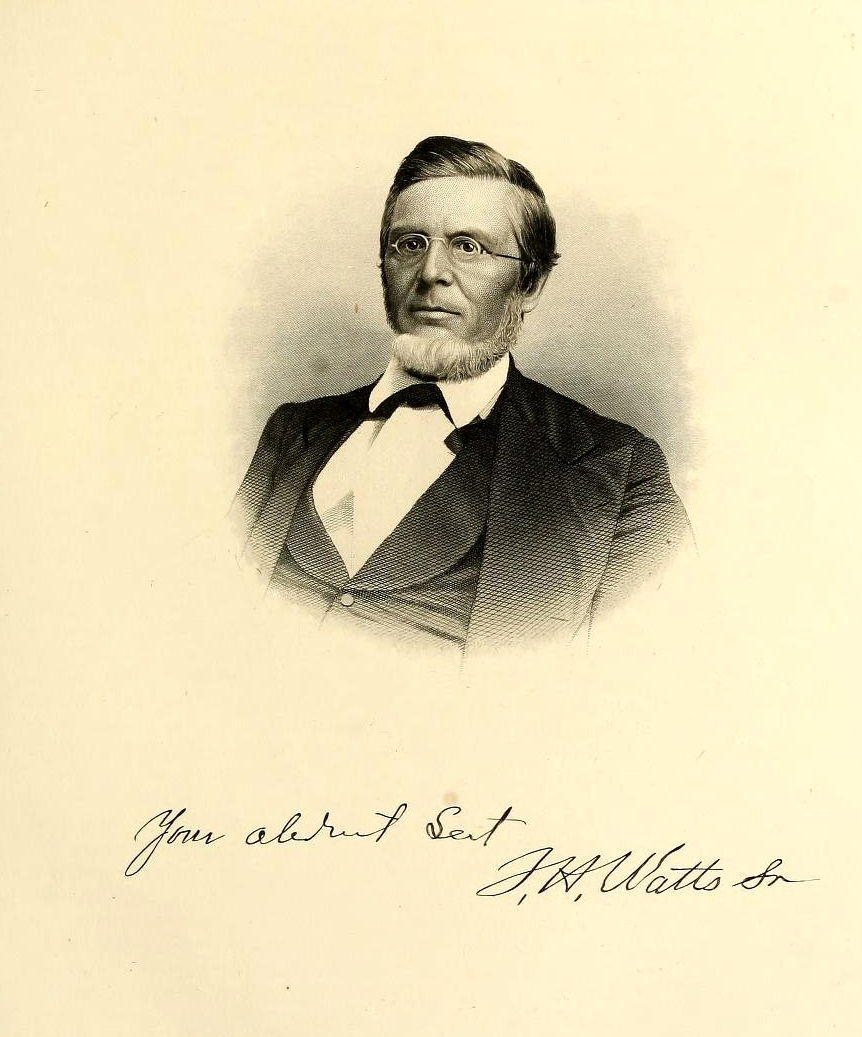
Engraved portrait of Thomas H. Watts

Thomas Hill Watts Sr. (January 3, 1819 – September 16, 1892) was an American lawyer, slaveowner, Confederate States Attorney General and the 18th governor of Alabama from 1863 to 1865, during the Civil War.

== Early life ==
Watts was born at Pine Flat in the Alabama Territory on January 3, 1819, the oldest of twelve children born to John Hughes Watts and Catherine Prudence Hill, who had moved from Georgia to find the better lands of the frontier. He was of English and Welsh ancestry. Prepared for college at the Airy Mount Academy in Dallas County, Watts graduated with honors from the University of Virginia in 1840. The next year, he passed the bar examination and began practicing law in Greenville. In 1848 he moved his lucrative law practice to Montgomery. He also became a wealthy plantation owner, enslaving 179 people in 1860.

== Political career ==
Elected to the Alabama State Legislature in the 1840s as a Whig, Watts also served in the Alabama State Senate in 1853. After the Whig party collapsed, he ran for Congress as a Know Nothing in 1855, but lost. Initially Watts took a pro-Union stance as tensions rose in the 1850s. But on the eve of the Civil War he became an advocate of secession and called for Alabama's immediate exit from the Union following the election of Republican President Abraham Lincoln in 1860. Watts played an important role in the Alabama secession convention and was one of the signers of the secession ordinance.

Watts' reputation as a former moderate led to his defeat by fervent secessionist John Gill Shorter in the 1861 Alabama gubernatorial election. Watts then organized the 17th Regiment Alabama Infantry and led it into battle at Pensacola and Corinth, but resigned as its colonel in April 1862 when he was selected to become the attorney general in Confederate President Jefferson Davis' cabinet.

Watts served as attorney general for 18 months, often tasked with managing legal matters related to conscription and the order of precedence between local state organizations and Confederate military authority. He worked diligently, and gained a reputation as a competent and thoughtful chief legal officer.

== Governor of Alabama ==
Watts left his post as attorney general to run for Alabama governor in the 1863 election, facing off against his former opponent John Gill Shorter in a repeat of the 1861 contest. However, the military situation in Alabama had deteriorated greatly in the intervening two years. Union troops occupied the north of the state, there were major food shortages, and thousands of Alabama troops had deserted the army and formed hostile gangs that threatened Confederate control of the state. Watts defeated the incumbent Governor Shorter by a 3-1 margin, and took office on December 1, 1863. Facing a disgruntled populace that increasingly preferred peace and a return to the Union rather than more war, Watts embarked on a speaking tour of the state to make the case for continuing the war effort.

Watts' administration turned to severe measures to try to salvage the economic situation in Alabama. These initiatives included impressment of slaves for forced labor, tax-in-kind policies, and other efforts that further alienated the already-suffering civilian population and left some communities on the verge of starvation. In the face of discontent, Watts tried to position these unpopular measures as Confederate government policies rather than the actions of his administration. Compelled to aid the destitute population, the state government printed paper money which was not backed by hard assets, leading to massive inflation.

Military manpower was a constant and unsolvable problem. As the war began to turn against the Confederacy, there was greater resistance to patriotic appeals for men to form new volunteer companies. Desertion was a major drain on Alabama's manpower, with many men leaving the army without permission, defying conscription officers, and practicing armed resistance against the state government. By the end of 1864, gangs of armed deserters had turned half of Alabama's counties into lawless zones where the edicts of the governor and the national government had no effect. Watts' appealed to the state legislature to restore order by reorganizing the awkward two-class state militia, but this measure was defeated. The legislature, now filled with peace advocates, refused to reform the laws that limited the ability to send militia units outside of their home counties, which made them useless from a military perspective. As a result, Alabama did not have an effective home guard force either to fend off Union incursions or retake the rebellious regions of the state.

When the Confederate Congress passed a new conscription law drafting men age 17-50, Watts, who had previously supported conscription as Confederate attorney general, defied the national government and fought hard to maintain local manpower under his control. Drawing on these age groups would have taken away the men Watts was relying on to supply the state militia, and would further alienate those who resented being sent away to fight in a war they now considered hopeless. Governor Watts wrote to the Confederate Secretary of War James Seddon, stating "Unless you order the commandant of conscripts to stop interfering with such companies there will be a conflict between the Confederate general and State authorities" and threatened to resist conscription by force of arms. Seddon backed down and allowed Watts to keep control of the Alabama militia forces, and the state supreme court affirmed Watts' authority to maintain the militia's exemption from conscription.

By September 1864, another turbulent issue confronted Governor Watts as a faction in the Alabama House of Representatives introduced resolutions in calling for peace and restoration to the Union. Watts bitterly denounced them and the measures were defeated in the legislature, but the Governor was aware that he would most likely lose his bid for reelection in the fall to the pro-Union faction. By early 1865 anti-war sentiment was so widespread in Alabama it was reported to Union General Ulysses S. Grant that Watts' administration might possibly be overthrown by the peace party in Alabama.

The military situation worsened as US Navy forces captured Mobile Bay in August 1864, and Union cavalry raided across the state destroying infrastructure. When the state capital of Montgomery was threatened, Watts evacuated the government to Eufaula before he was arrested by US soldiers at Union Springs, Alabama, on May 1, 1865. Released without charge a few weeks later, Watts returned to resume his law practice in Montgomery. He managed to build up a successful practice and argued more cases before the Supreme Court of Alabama than any other attorney of that era. Watts later returned to the state legislature for one term (1880–81), was president of the state bar association, and after his death was remembered as "Alabama's greatest lawyer".

Thomas Hill Watts died of a heart attack at age 73, on September 16, 1892, in Montgomery, Alabama.

== Family ==
On January 10, 1842, he wed Eliza Brown Allen, and they had ten children.

He was the great-great-grandfather of the white supremacist William Luther Pierce.

Party political offices
Vacant Title last held by William S. Earnest	Whig nominee for Governor of Alabama; 1861, 1863	Succeeded by Robert M. Patton
Legal offices
Preceded by Thomas Bragg	Confederate States Attorney General; 1862–1863	Succeeded by Wade Keyes (Acting)
Political offices
Preceded by John Shorter	Governor of Alabama; 1863–1865	Succeeded by Lewis Parsons
