= George Davis (American politician) =

American politician (1820–1896)

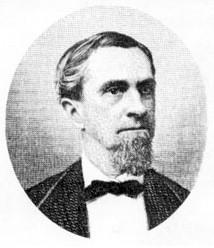

4th Confederate States Attorney General
- In office January 2, 1864 – April 26, 1865
- President: Jefferson Davis
- Preceded by: Wade Keyes (Acting)
- Succeeded by: Position Abolished

Confederate States Senator from North Carolina
- In office February 18, 1862 – January 2, 1864
- Preceded by: Constituency established
- Succeeded by: Edwin Godwin Reade

Personal details
- Born: March 1, 1820 Wilmington, North Carolina, U.S.
- Died: February 23, 1896 (aged 75) Wilmington, North Carolina, U.S.
- Party: Whig Party (until 1856), Constitutional Union Party (1860)
- Education: University of North Carolina, Chapel Hill

George Davis (March 1, 1820 – February 23, 1896) was a Confederate politician and railroad counsel who served as attorney general of the Confederate States for 480 days in 1864 and 1865.

A skilled orator, he gave a notable public speech in March 1861 in which he argued that North Carolina should secede from the United States of America to protect the private economic interest in chattel slavery.

== Biography ==
=== Early years ===
George Davis was born on his father's slave operated plantation at Porters Neck, near Wilmington, North Carolina. He attended the University of North Carolina and was valedictorian of its Class of 1838. He studied law and was admitted to the bar in 1840.

In 1848, he became general counsel of the Wilmington and Weldon Railroad, a highly remunerative position that he held until the end of his life.

=== 1861 Peace Conference delegate ===
Davis began his political career as a Whig. The party collapsed in 1856. With other Southern former Whigs who wanted to avoid secession over the slavery issue and refused to join either the Republican Party or the Democratic Party, he backed the Constitutional Union Party in the Election of 1860.

Following the election of Abraham Lincoln, Davis served as a delegate from North Carolina to the Washington Peace Conference of February 4–27, 1861.

Davis reacted negatively to constitutional amendment proposals that would have preserved slavery where it existed but prohibited slavery in any territory of the United States "now held, or hereafter acquired" north of the latitude 36 degrees, 30 minutes line.

He returned to Wilmington a secessionist.

=== Secession to save the slave economy ===
On March 2, 1861 — just days after returning to Wilmington from the peace conference — Davis made a public speech in which he spoke of North Carolina's requirement to secede.

He made clear publicly that he was a secessionist. Secession, he said, was required to protect the economic interests of North Carolina:

We could never accept the plan adopted by the Convention as consistent with the rights, the interests, or the dignity of North Carolina ... The division must be made on the line of slavery. The state must go with the South.

Pro-slavery North Carolina elites declared secession from the Union on May 20, 1861. The state's formal involvement with the confederate government began. Soon after, North Carolina secessionists placed Davis on a slate from which he was chosen a delegate to the Provisional Confederate Congress for 1861-1862. Later, Davis was elected to a two-year term in the Senate.

=== Confederate senator ===
On September 27, 1863, Davis's wife, Mary Adelaide Polk Davis (of the politically prominent Polk Family, of which former President Polk had been a member) died in Wilmington, aged 43.

Later that autumn, the North Carolina General Assembly passed over Davis for reelection, selecting William Alexander Graham to the Senate seat.

To keep George Davis in the failing rump government, Jefferson Davis (no known relation) in January 1864 appointed George Davis as Attorney General ahead of his senate term's end on February 17, 1864.

=== Confederate attorney general ===
George Davis resigned the senate and then held the cabinet post from January 2, 1864.

The duties of Confederate attorney general were minimal and notably did not involve any part of military affairs.

As the Confederate Supreme Court was never created, there was little for the attorney general to do other than to attend cabinet meetings, complete any advisory tasks assigned by Jefferson Davis, and to draft legal guidance for other cabinet members based on the thin book of Confederate statutes.

Davis served in the post until his resignation soon after the Fall of Richmond in April 1865.

Offers of public service were made to him before and after the war, but he refused them all.

George Davis never held any office under the flag of the United States of America.

=== Fugitive and prisoner ===
As the Confederacy collapsed, George Davis accompanied the fugitive government as far as Charlotte, North Carolina. He submitted a resignation on April 25, 1865, and received notice of its acceptance the next day. He had served as attorney general for 68 weeks and three days.

Davis then, traveling alone, attempted to flee to England by way of Florida and Nassau. As he planned to leave the United States, he chose to let his motherless children remain with extended family.

Davis was captured by United States forces at Key West, Florida, on October 18, 1865. He was imprisoned at Fort Hamilton in Brooklyn, New York until being given his parole by President Johnson on January 2, 1866.

=== Private life and death ===
Davis accepted an appointment as a delegate to the 1866 National Union Convention.

Davis returned to Wilmington. He rebuilt his law practice and worked as a railroad counsel. Davis married Monimia Davis (née Fairfax), 17 years his junior and a member of Virginia's elite and powerful Fairfax and Randolph families.

In 1878, Governor Zebulon Baird Vance offered Davis the chief justiceship of the state supreme court, but Davis turned it down on the grounds that he could not live on the salary.

He gave his last public speech in 1889, at a memorial event in Wilmington for Jefferson Davis. In the speech, George Davis summarized his own political career in a sentence:

My ambition went down with the banner of the South, and, like it, never rose again.

He died in 1896, aged 75.

=== Monument ===
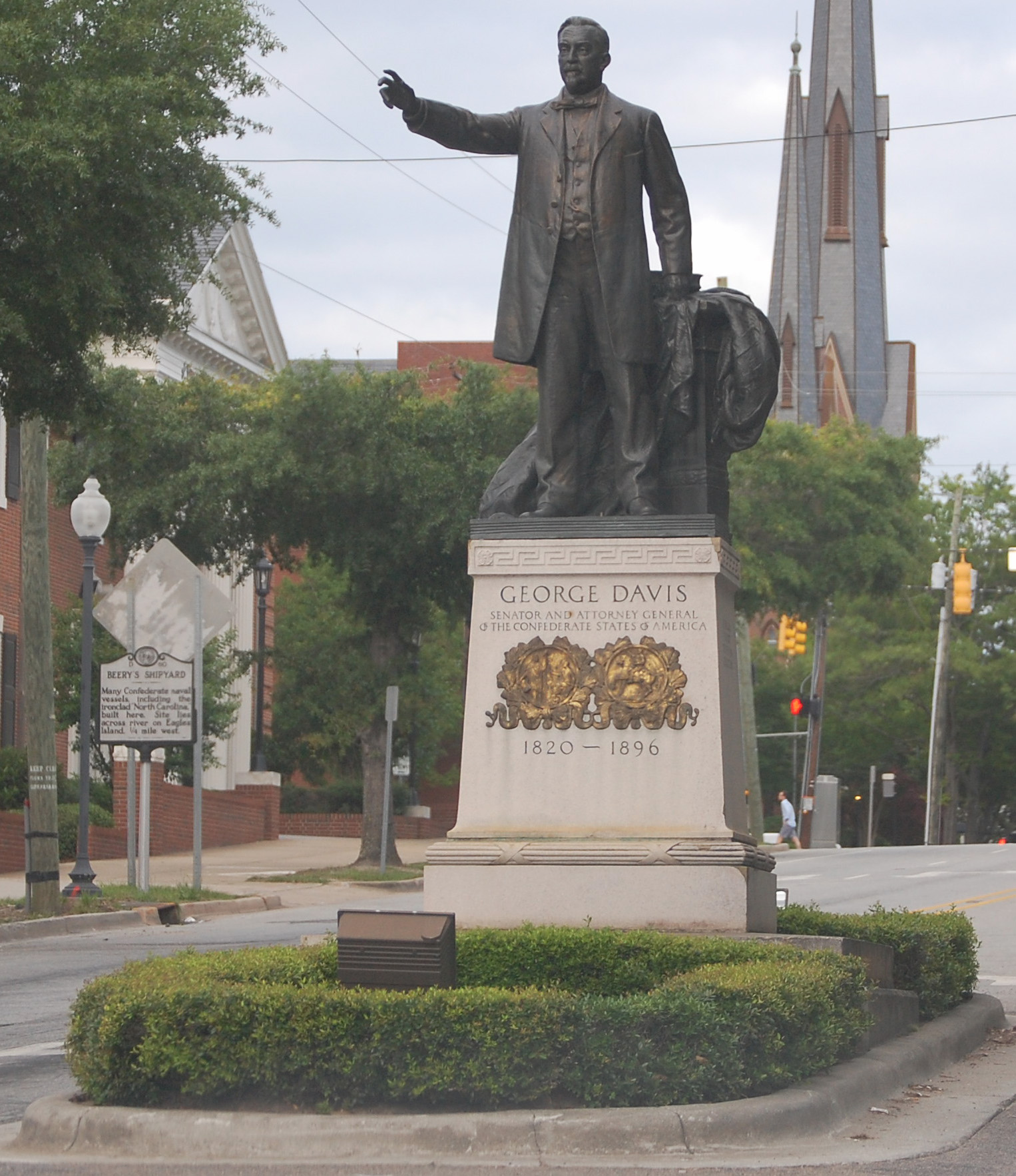
George Davis Monument in Wilmington, NC, before the statue's removal

In 1911, a Confederate monument to Davis was dedicated in downtown Wilmington, North Carolina, by the United Daughters of the Confederacy.

The monument shows Davis, hand on lectern, giving a speech. Its stone base includes a encomium to Davis's virtue. On June 25, 2020, the statue, but not its pedestal, was temporarily removed by the City of Wilmington coincident with the firing of three police officers the city said had participated in "brutally racist" discussions recorded on official police equipment. To justify the dismantling, the city government cited the public safety exception within the state law intended to frustrate the removal of confederate monuments in North Carolina. The city did not announce a place of storage or a date for re-erection.

On August 2, 2021, the City Council approved an agreement with Cape Fear 3, United Daughters of the Confederacy to permanently remove the monument from public land.

=== Grave marker ===
After his death in 1896, his remains were buried in Wilmington's Oakdale Cemetery under a flat stone marker that bears a Celtic Cross.

The marker includes this inscription —

Statesman, yet friend to truth of soul sincere
In action faithful and in honor, dear

— and an edited quotation of Psalm 15.

=== Highway historical marker ===
In 1949, the North Carolina state government placed a highway historical marker regarding Davis on US Highway 17 at Porters Neck Road near Wilmington.:

GEORGE DAVIS
1820-1896
Served the Confederacy
as a senator, 1862-64, &
as the attorney general,
1864-65. His birthplace
was three miles east.

=== Liberty ship ===
In World War II, the United States Liberty ship SS George Davis was named in his honor. It was scrapped in 1960.

=== Portrait ===
During the court's Fall Term of 1915, his family presented a portrait of George Davis to hang in the library of the Supreme Court of North Carolina. All other portraits in the court's collection are of justices of the court.

=== Sons of Confederate Veterans Unit ===
A unit of the Sons of Confederate Veterans was named "George Davis Camp 5."

Confederate States Senate
New constituency	Confederate States Senator (Class 1) from North Carolina; 1862–1864; Served alongside: William Dortch	Succeeded by Edwin Godwin Reade
Legal offices
Preceded by Wade Keyes; Acting	Confederate States Attorney General; 1864–1865	Position abolished
