= Wade Keyes =

American jurist (1821–1879)

Confederate States Attorney General Acting
- In office October 1, 1863 – January 2, 1864
- President: Jefferson Davis
- Preceded by: Thomas Watts
- Succeeded by: George Davis
- In office September 17, 1861 – November 21, 1861
- President: Jefferson Davis
- Preceded by: Judah Benjamin
- Succeeded by: Thomas Bragg

Personal details
- Born: October 10, 1821 Mooresville, Alabama, U.S.
- Died: March 2, 1879 (aged 57) Florence, Alabama, U.S.
- Party: Democratic
- Education: Transylvania University

Wade Keyes (1821 – 1879) was a lawyer, scholar, judge and professor from Alabama who served as the first and only Assistant Attorney General of the Confederacy, 1861–1865. After the Civil War he practiced law in Florence, Alabama.

== Early life ==
Keyes was born 1821 on his father's plantation at Mooresville, Limestone County, near Athens, Alabama. He was first being educated by private tutors at home, followed by studies at LaGrange College, Alabama and the University of Virginia. Keyes had to leave the University of Virginia due to illness and death in the family. He later read law under Judge William Richardsson and Judge Daniel Coleman in Athens, before attending Transylvania University in Lexington, Kentucky, where he graduated from the law department.

== Lawyer, scholar, judge and professor ==
Following his graduation Keyes spent a year in Europe. After returning to the States, he moved to Marianna, Florida, where he began to practice law in 1844. His specialty was property cases. In 1851 Keyes moved to Montgomery, Alabama, where he established a law practice. He wrote three legal treaties on property law: An Essay on the Learning of Remainders (1852), An Essay on the Learning of Future Interests in Real Property (1853) and An Essay on the Learning of Partial and of Future Interests in Chattels Personal (1853).

In 1853, the Legislature elected Keyes Chancellor of the Southern Division of the Court of Chancery, over Francis Bugbee and Sterling G. Cato of Barbour County. He served for a six-year period until 1859. As a judge of equity Keyes would successfully apply his considerable learning to adjudications of complicated real and personal property cases.

While serving as chancellor, Keyes began to teach classes of property law at Montgomery. After the end of his tenure, he founded the Montgomery Law School as a permanent continuation of his teaching project. It was incorporated in 1860 as an independent institution, but attached to the University of Alabama as its law department. As the founder Keyes role as the sole teacher was guaranteed by the incorporation act. At the initiative of Justice Samuel F. Rice, the Legislature granted the school the right to confer academic degrees and to license its students to practice law. The turmoil of the Secession Crisis led to the closing of the school in February 1861, as the students left and volunteered for different military organizations.

== Assistant Attorney General ==
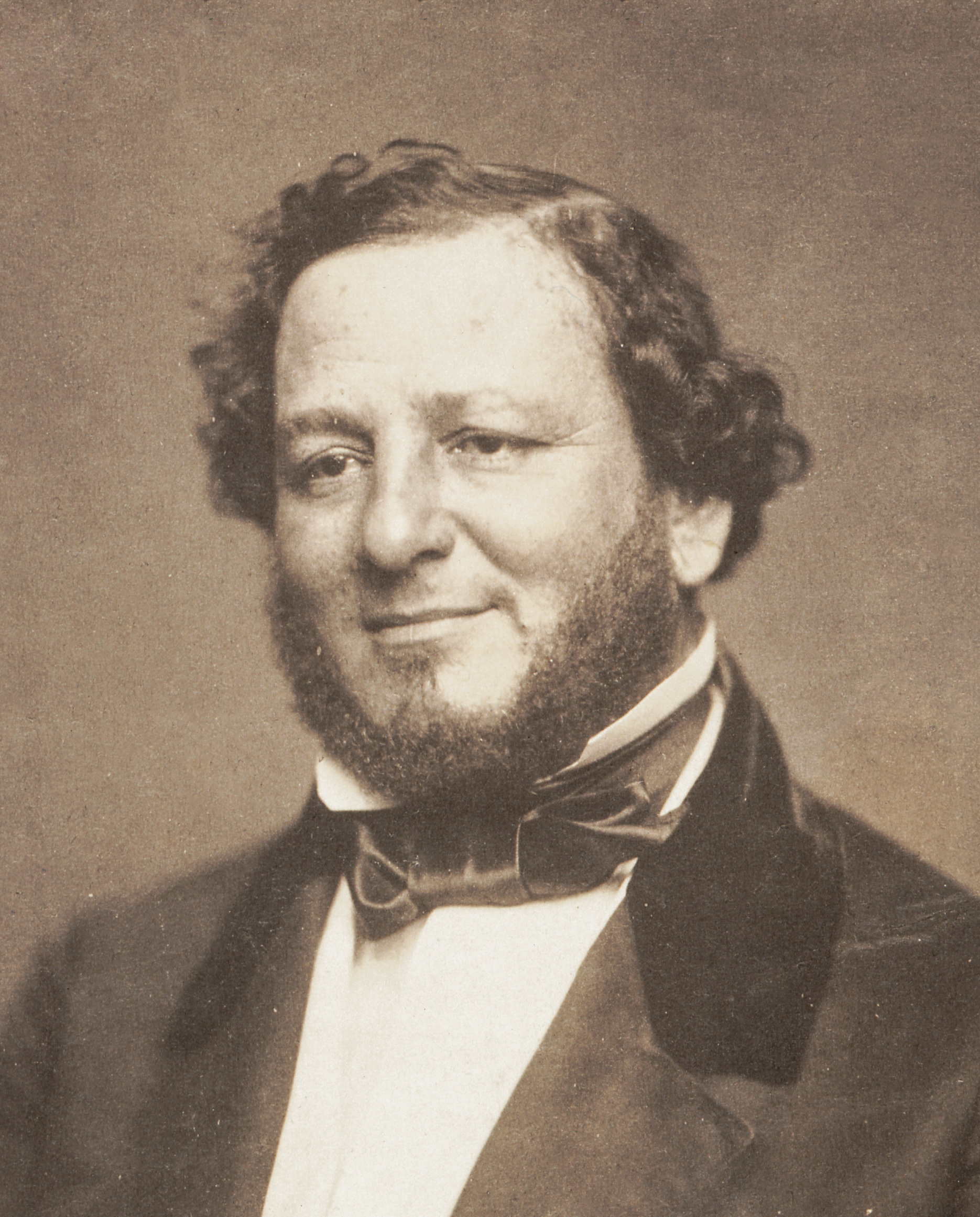
Judah P. Benjamin

The crisis that led the students to leave his school also caused Keyes to join the military. He enlisted as lieutenant in the Montgomery Rifles, and served at Pensacola, Florida. This was a unit in the Army of Alabama before the state became part of the Confederacy. When Judah P. Benjamin became attorney general of the Confederacy he made Keyes his assistant. Benjamin had met Keyes when he was chancellor and valued him as an administrator, legal scholar and proficient writer. As assistant attorney general, Keyes did more of the routine work of an attorney general than Benjamin did and was the man who actually ran the day-to-day work of the department. When Benjamin on September 17, 1861, was appointed secretary of war Keyes took over as acting attorney general until Thomas Bragg officially took office November 21, 1861. Bragg held the office until March 18, 1862, when succeeded by Thomas H. Watts. When Watts was elected governor of Alabama, he resigned, and Keyes served as acting attorney general from October 1, 1863, until January 2, 1864, when George Davis became the fourth and last ordinary attorney general of the Confederacy. Keyes also served as Attorney General ad interim during the Christmas Holidays of 1861, in October and November 1862, in August 1863 and in September and October 1864.

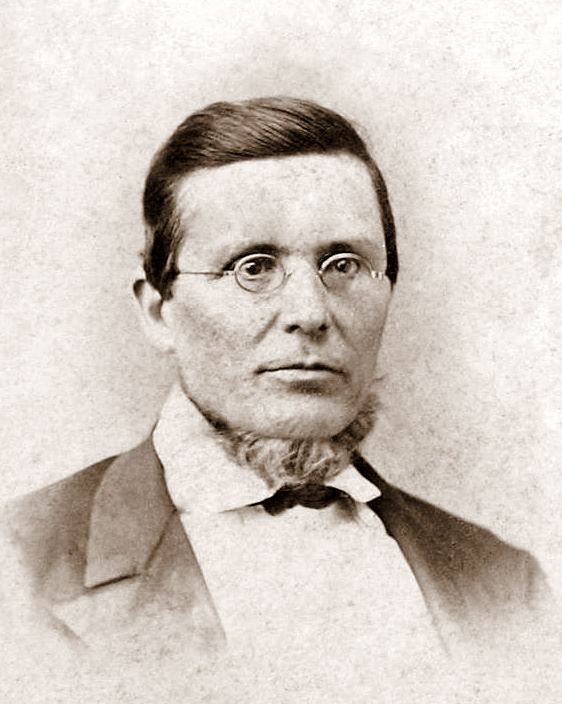
Thomas H. Watts

Keyes wrote 23 of 218 opinions issued by the Confederate office of Attorney General. They are characterized by conservative construction, deference to common law and cautious interpretations of acts of the Confederate Congress. He sustained United States acts in force at the time of the withdrawal of the Confederate states from the Federal Union, if not replaced by Confederate law, and also relied on existing United States law when Confederate law was absent. Keyes argued that the Attorney General had no authority to issue opinions concerning constitutional questions other than when advising the president when he was about to sign or veto an act of congress. His reasoning was based on the constitutionally exercised legislative power of Congress; Congress had the right to determine what actions were to be taken. The Attorney General was restricted to limit his opinions to rulings of the judicial branch respecting constitutionality and lawfulness. Furthermore, Keyes, as well as Jefferson Davis, maintained that the President was obligated to enforce legislation although deemed contrary to the Constitution by the President. If Congress overrode the President's veto, he - as well as the subordinate officers of the government - was then bound to uphold the law. The fact that the Confederate Congress had failed to create a Confederate supreme court was neither considered by Keyes, nor by Davis.

Considering if the Virginia law that prohibited the use of grain for making whiskey was applicable when farmers distilled whiskey for delivery to the Confederate War Department, Keyes reached the same conclusion as the United States Supreme Court did in 1819 in McCulloch v. Maryland. Congress had the implied power to supply soldiers with whiskey since that was a reasonable means of supporting the army. State law could not interfere. Keyes clearly established that intergovernmental immunity not only prevented the states from interfering with the activities of the Confederate government, but also forbade the government from thwarting state actions. For this reason the Confederacy could not tax the states and the states could not tax the Confederate government. Nevertheless, government ownership of stock in a corporation was not enough to make the corporation free from state taxation. This rule also applied when a state bank acted as a fiscal agent of a state, but not when a state bank acted in its private capacity. When the Confederate government planned to requisition slaves for government use, he advised that the government was accountable for the value of any enslaved person seized and he recommended Congress to judge each case separately, which prompted it to create a slave claims board. Keyes also ruled that only military personnel could stand trial before courts-martial.

Keyes was never considered for the position of Attorney General. A reason might have been his integrity. He was reprimanded by Jefferson Davis for having questioned the president's authority when he had intervened in cases where the accounting officers by law were to make independent rulings.

== Postbellum lawyer ==
When the war was over, Keyes returned to Montgomery and reopened his legal practice. He moved to Florence, Alabama in 1867. In 1876 he was entrusted with the task of codifying the laws of Alabama together with Judge Fern M. Wood (who fell victim to a killer before the task was finished); the project was completed within the year. Keyes suddenly died in 1879.

== Family ==
Wade Keyes was the oldest son of General George Keyes (1792–1833), a planter and merchant at Mooresville, and his wife Nellie Rutledge Keyes (1799–1834) from Tennessee. He was the grandson of Captain John Wades Keyes (1752–1839) and the brother of John Washington Keyes (1825–1892) and George P. Keyes (1829–?).

Wade's father George Keyes was born in Washington County, Virginia. Early in life he moved to Alabama with his twin brother. He served under Andrew Jackson as captain of a volunteer company and was later elected brigadier general of militia and bore the title of general all his life. George married Wade's mother in Sullivan County, Tennessee in 1820. Wade's grandfather John Wade Keyes was born in Mystic, Massachusetts, (Note: "Mystic" was the name of an area near the Mystic River, now divided between the towns of Malden and Medford in Middlesex County.) settled near Alexandria, Virginia, moved to Blountville, Tennessee and finally to Athens, Alabama.

Wade Keyes married Alice Wharton Whitfield of Leon County, Florida, a daughter of General George Whitfield, in 1848. They had three daughters that reached adulthood and five children who died in infancy. Wade's brother John Washington was a doctor of medicine and dentistry. During the war John served as an officer in Hilliard's Legion and later as a military surgeon; after the war he practiced dentistry. Wade's other brother George was a journalist and later register and master in the chancery court, served in Hilliard's Legion and later when disabled commanded a home guard battalion. After the war George was a newspaperman and business promoter in Sheffield, Alabama.

== Notes ==
Legal offices
Preceded by Judah Benjamin	Confederate States Attorney General; Acting; 1861	Succeeded by Thomas Bragg
Preceded by Thomas Watts	Confederate States Attorney General; Acting; 1863–1864	Succeeded by George Davis
