= Confederate States Attorney General =

The Attorney General of the Confederate States of America was a member of the Confederate cabinet. The office of Attorney General of the Confederate States was created by a statute which established the Department of Justice. By the establishing statute, it was "the duty of the Attorney General to prosecute and conduct all suits in the Supreme Court, in which the Confederate States [was] concerned, and to give his advice and opinion upon questions of law, when required by the President of the Confederate States, or when requested by any of the heads of departments, touching any matters that may concern their departments on subjects before them." In this respect, his duties were the same as those of the United States Attorney General. But additionally, he had "supervisory power over the accounts of the marshals, clerks and officers of all the courts of the Confederate States, and all claims against the Confederate States." The Supreme Court was never established because of "fierce opposition" by white supremacists to a federal court that could abolish slavery.

Though the United States had established their office of Attorney General by the Judiciary Act of 1789, this act establishing the Confederate States Department of Justice predated and preceded the establishment of the United States Department of Justice by almost a decade, making it an earlier Department of Justice that was not in the United States and that failed to create a Supreme Court.

== List of attorneys general ==
#	Picture	Name	Term began	Term ended	Political party (Note: While organized political parties did not exist in the Confederacy, most Confederate leaders were members of the Democratic Party before and after the American Civil War.)
1		Judah P. Benjamin	February 21, 1861	September 17, 1861	Democrat
		Wade Keyes (Assistant Attorney General)	September 17, 1861	November 21, 1861	Democrat
2		Thomas Bragg	November 21, 1861	March 18, 1862	Democrat
3		Thomas H. Watts	March 18, 1862	October 1, 1863	Democrat
		Wade Keyes (Attorney General ad interim)	October 1, 1863	January 2, 1864	Democrat
4		George Davis	January 2, 1864	April 24, 1865	Democrat

== Bibliography ==
- Peterson, Dennis (2016). Confederate Cabinet Departments and Secretaries. McFarland. ISBN 978-1476625140.
