= John Gill Shorter =

American politician (1818–1872)

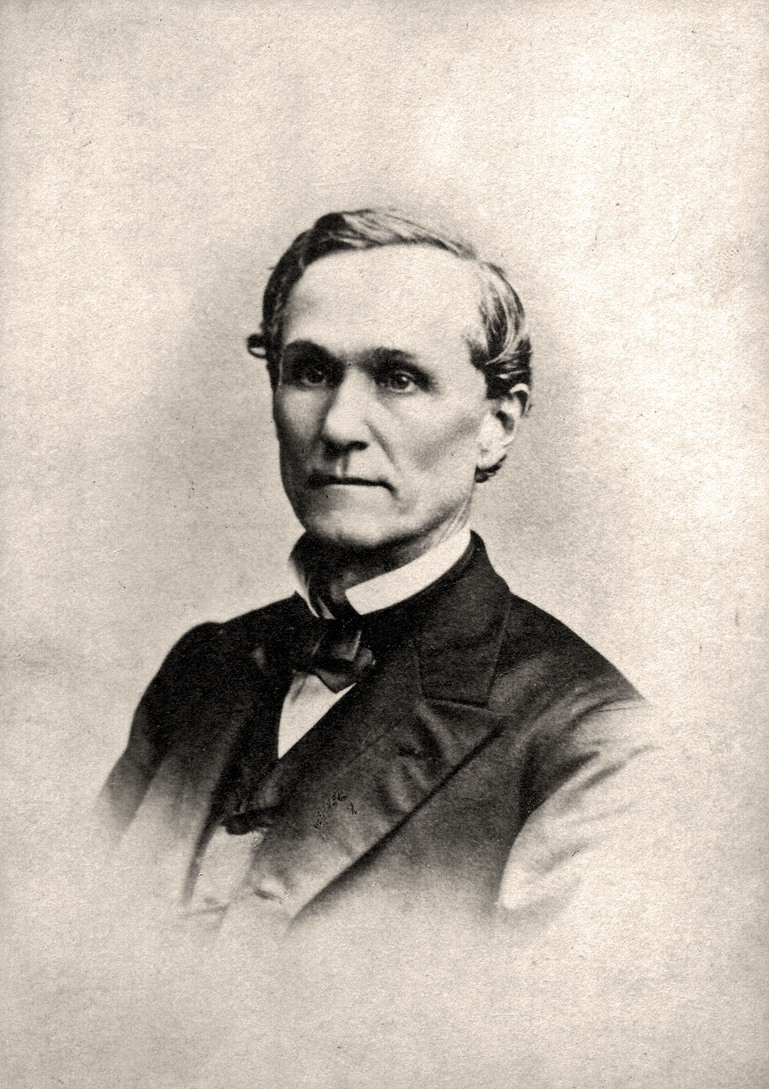

17th Governor of Alabama
- In office December 2, 1861 – December 1, 1863
- Preceded by: Andrew B. Moore
- Succeeded by: Thomas H. Watts

Deputy from Alabama to the Provisional Congress of the Confederate States
- In office February 4, 1861 – December 2, 1861
- Preceded by: New constituency
- Succeeded by: Constituency abolished

Personal details
- Born: April 23, 1818 Monticello, Georgia, U.S.
- Died: May 29, 1872 (aged 54) Eufaula, Alabama, U.S.
- Resting place: Shorter Cemetery, Eufaula, Alabama
- Party: Democratic

John Gill Shorter (April 23, 1818 – May 29, 1872) was an American politician, lawyer, and slaveowner who served as the 17th governor of Alabama from 1861 to 1863 during the American Civil War. Before assuming the governorship, Shorter was a Deputy from Alabama to the Provisional Congress of the Confederate States from February 1861 to December 1861.

== Early life ==
John Gill Shorter was born on April 23, 1818, in Monticello, Georgia. He attended the University of Georgia, graduating in 1837, then moved to Eufaula, Alabama where he studied law and was admitted to the bar in 1838.

In 1843 he married Mary Jane Battle, and established himself in Barbour county as a prominent South Alabama attorney, with sizeable holdings of land and slaves.

== Political career ==
As a Democrat, Shorter won a seat in the Alabama State Senate in 1845, then served in the lower house of the state legislature in 1851 before stepping down to become a circuit judge. An early supporter of secession, Shorter attended the 1850 Nashville Convention where delegates from nine Southern states met to consider leaving the United States due to the slavery debate. After Alabama seceded from the Union in 1861, Governor Andrew B. Moore sent Shorter as a commissioner to Georgia, where he urged the neighboring state to follow Alabama and secede.

Shorter was then chosen as one of Alabama's delegates to the Provisional Congress of the Confederate States, where he established a reputation as a strong supporter of the Davis administration's policies. He left his Congressional seat to run for governor in the 1861 election, defeating Whig candidate Thomas H. Watts while public enthusiasm for the war was still high.

Taking office on December 2, 1861, Shorter was soon faced with major reverses as Union troops pushed Confederate forces out of Tennessee and into North Alabama. Facing a naval blockade of Mobile bay and with a shortage of local manufacturing facilities, Alabama struggled to adequately arm its troops. Shorter's administration funded investments in local arms factories but production was slow and the state government was forced to seek out civilian-owned obsolete muskets to arm the Alabama troops. Law and order began to deteriorate, and anti-Confederate rebellions led by deserters broke out in North and Southeast Alabama. By August 1863 there were an estimated 8,000 deserters and rebels in the Alabama hill country.

Shorter called on the state legislature to form a militia for local defense, as Alabama's regular army regiments were away in other states and conscription had thinned the reserves of manpower available to the state. The bill created County Reserves of teenage boys and State Reserves of older men to try to resolve the problem, but desertion from the ranks was still a major issue. Many soldiers returned home to Alabama without permission, seeking to support their families who were facing near-famine conditions by the mid-point of the war.

Governor Shorter also made efforts to impress slaves to build fortifications and maintain critical railroads. Thousands were sent to work at Mobile and other points across the state, and at least 500 enslaved people died laboring under harsh conditions. Many wealthy plantation owners resented the use of their slaves to serve the state or refused to supply them, and Shorter later reflected that impressment of slaves was the main reason for his defeat when he ran for reelection.

Shorter faced his same opponent from the last election, T.H. Watts, in the 1863 Alabama gubernatorial election, but this time the discontented Alabama populace voted for Watts by a 3-1 margin. Leaving office in December, 1863, Shorter did not return to public life, and died on May 29, 1872, in Eufaula, Alabama.

Party political offices
Preceded by Andrew B. Moore	Democratic nominee for Governor of Alabama; 1861, 1863	Succeeded by Michael J. Bulger
Political offices
New constituency	Deputy from Alabama to the Provisional Congress of the Confederate States; 1861	Constituency abolished
Preceded by Andrew B. Moore	Governor of Alabama; 1861–1863	Succeeded by Thomas H. Watts
