= Confederate States of America =

Unrecognized state in North America (1861–1865)

- 1861–1865
- Top: Flag (1861–1863); Bottom: Flag (1865) Seal (1863–1865)
- Motto: Deo vindice (Under) God, (our) vindicator
- Anthem: God Save the South (unofficial) Dixie (popular, unofficial) March: The Bonnie Blue Flag
- The Confederate States; Territorial claims made and under partial control for a time; Separated West Virginia; Contested Native American territory
- Status: Unrecognized state
- Capital: Montgomery, Alabama (until May 29, 1861); Richmond, Virginia (until April 2–3, 1865); Danville, Virginia (until April 10, 1865); Greensboro, North Carolina (until May 5, 1865)
- Largest city: New Orleans (until May 1, 1862)
- Common languages: English (de facto) minor languages: French (Louisiana), Indigenous languages (Indian territory)
- Demonyms: Confederate; Southerner
- Government: Confederation of independent states (1861–1862) Federal presidential republic (1862–1865)
- President
  - 1861–1865: Jefferson Davis
- Vice President
  - 1861–1865: Alexander H. Stephens
- Legislature: Congress
  - Upper house: Senate
  - Lower house: House of Representatives
- Historical era: American Civil War
  - Provisional constitution: February 8, 1861
  - American Civil War: April 12, 1861
  - Permanent constitution: February 22, 1862
  - Battle of Appomattox Court House: April 9, 1865
  - Military collapse: April 26, 1865
  - Debellation and dissolution: May 5, 1865

Population
  - 1860 (Note: Slaves are included in the above population according to the 1860 census.): 9,103,332
  - Slaves (Note: Population values do not include Missouri, Kentucky, or the Arizona Territory.): 3,521,110
- Currency: Confederate States dollar; State currencies
Preceded by
South Carolina
Mississippi
Florida
Alabama
Georgia
Louisiana
Texas
Virginia
Arkansas
North Carolina
Tennessee
Arizona Territory
Succeeded by
West Virginia
Tennessee
Arkansas
Florida
Alabama
Louisiana
North Carolina
South Carolina
Virginia
Mississippi
Texas
Georgia
Arizona Territory
- Today part of: United States

The Confederate States of America (CSA), also known as the Confederate States or the Confederacy, was a breakaway republic in the Southern United States from 1861 to 1865, unrecognized as a sovereign nation by either foreign governments or the United States. The Confederacy was formed on February 8, 1861, by seven states that had seceded from the Union. The original seven were South Carolina, Mississippi, Florida, Alabama, Georgia, Louisiana, and Texas; they were later joined by Virginia, Arkansas, Tennessee, and North Carolina. These states fought against the United States during the American Civil War in the wake of the 1860 election of Abraham Lincoln as president, with the principal aim of safeguarding slavery amid fears of northern abolitionist influence and federal interference in slave property. The South also feared that Lincoln's insistence that slavery not be permitted to expand into the Western territories would result in the admission of additional free states and the eventual demise of slavery.

The Confederacy adopted a constitution establishing a confederation government of "sovereign and independent states". The federal government in Washington D.C. and the states that remained in it were known as the "Union". The Civil War began in April 1861, when South Carolina's militia attacked Fort Sumter. Four slave states of the Upper South—Virginia, Arkansas, Tennessee, and North Carolina—then seceded and joined the Confederacy. In February 1862, Confederate States Army leaders installed a centralized federal government in Richmond, Virginia, and enacted the first Confederate draft on April 16, 1862. By 1865, the Confederacy's federal government dissolved into chaos, and the Confederate States Congress adjourned, effectively ceasing to exist as a legislative body on March 18. After four years of heavy fighting, most Confederate land and naval forces either surrendered or otherwise ceased hostilities by May 1865. The most significant capitulation was Confederate general Robert E. Lee's surrender on April 9, after which any doubt about the war's outcome or the Confederacy's survival was extinguished.

After the war, during the Reconstruction era, the Confederate states were readmitted to Congress after each ratified the Thirteenth Amendment to the U.S. Constitution, which outlawed slavery, "except as a punishment for crime." Lost Cause mythology, an idealized view of the Confederacy valiantly fighting for a just cause, emerged in the decades after the war among former Confederate generals and politicians, and in organizations such as the United Daughters of the Confederacy, Ladies' Memorial Associations, and the Sons of Confederate Veterans. Intense periods of Lost Cause activity developed around the turn of the 20th century and during the civil rights movement of the 1950s and 1960s in reaction to growing support for racial equality. Advocates sought to ensure future generations of Southern whites would continue to support white supremacist policies such as the Jim Crow laws through activities such as building Confederate monuments and influencing the authors of textbooks. The modern display of the Confederate battle flag started primarily during the 1948 presidential election, when it was used by the pro-segregationist and white supremacist Dixiecrat Party.

== Origins ==
Historians widely agree that the preservation of the institution of slavery was the principal aim of the 11 Southern states that declared their secession from the United States (the Union) and formed the Confederate States of America. Seven of these states seceded before the outbreak of the American Civil War and four did so after hostilities began. While there is broad consensus among 21st-century historians that slavery was central to the conflict, there remains debate over which specific ideological, economic, political, or social factors were most influential and over the reasons why the North rejected the Southern states’ attempt to secede. Proponents of the Lost Cause interpretation, a viewpoint rejected by mainstream historians, deny that slavery was the primary cause of secession—a position contradicted by overwhelming historical evidence, including the secession documents of the states themselves.

A central political dispute in the antebellum period concerned whether slavery would be permitted to spread into the Western territories that were destined to become states. Initially, the Congress admitted new states in pairs—one slave and one free—to preserve sectional balance in the Senate, though not in the House of Representatives since free states tended to have larger electorates. By the mid‑19th century, the status of new territories as free or slave had become a defining political issue. Anti‑slavery sentiment was growing in the North, while in the South fear of abolition was intensifying. Another contributing factor was the rise of distinctly white Southern nationalism in preceding decades. The primary reason the North rejected secession was a commitment to preserving the Union, grounded in a sense of American nationalism.

Abraham Lincoln won the 1860 presidential election, and his victory prompted declarations of secession by seven slave states of the Deep South. These states—whose cotton‑based economies depended on enslaved labor—formed the Confederate States after Lincoln's election in November 1860 but before he took office in March 1861. Northern nationalists and Southern “Unionists” refused to recognize these declarations. No foreign government ever officially recognized the Confederacy. The U.S. government, under President James Buchanan, did not cede control of federal forts located in territory claimed by the Confederacy. The war began on April 12, 1861, when Confederate forces bombarded the Union garrison at Fort Sumter in the harbor of Charleston, South Carolina.

Other background factors contributing to the breakdown of the Union included partisan politics under the Second Party System, the growth of abolitionism, disputes over nullification versus secession, regional nationalisms, expansionism, economic tensions such as the Panic of 1857, and differing paths of modernization in the antebellum period. Although slavery and its related conflicts were the primary cause of the break with the Union, it was the act of disunion itself that sparked the ensuing war. Historian David M. Potter observed, "The problem for Americans who, in the age of Lincoln, wanted slaves to be free was not simply that southerners wanted the opposite, but that they themselves cherished a conflicting value: they wanted the Constitution, which protected slavery, to be honored, and the Union, which was a fellowship with slaveholders, to be preserved. Thus they were committed to values that could not logically be reconciled."

== Secession ==
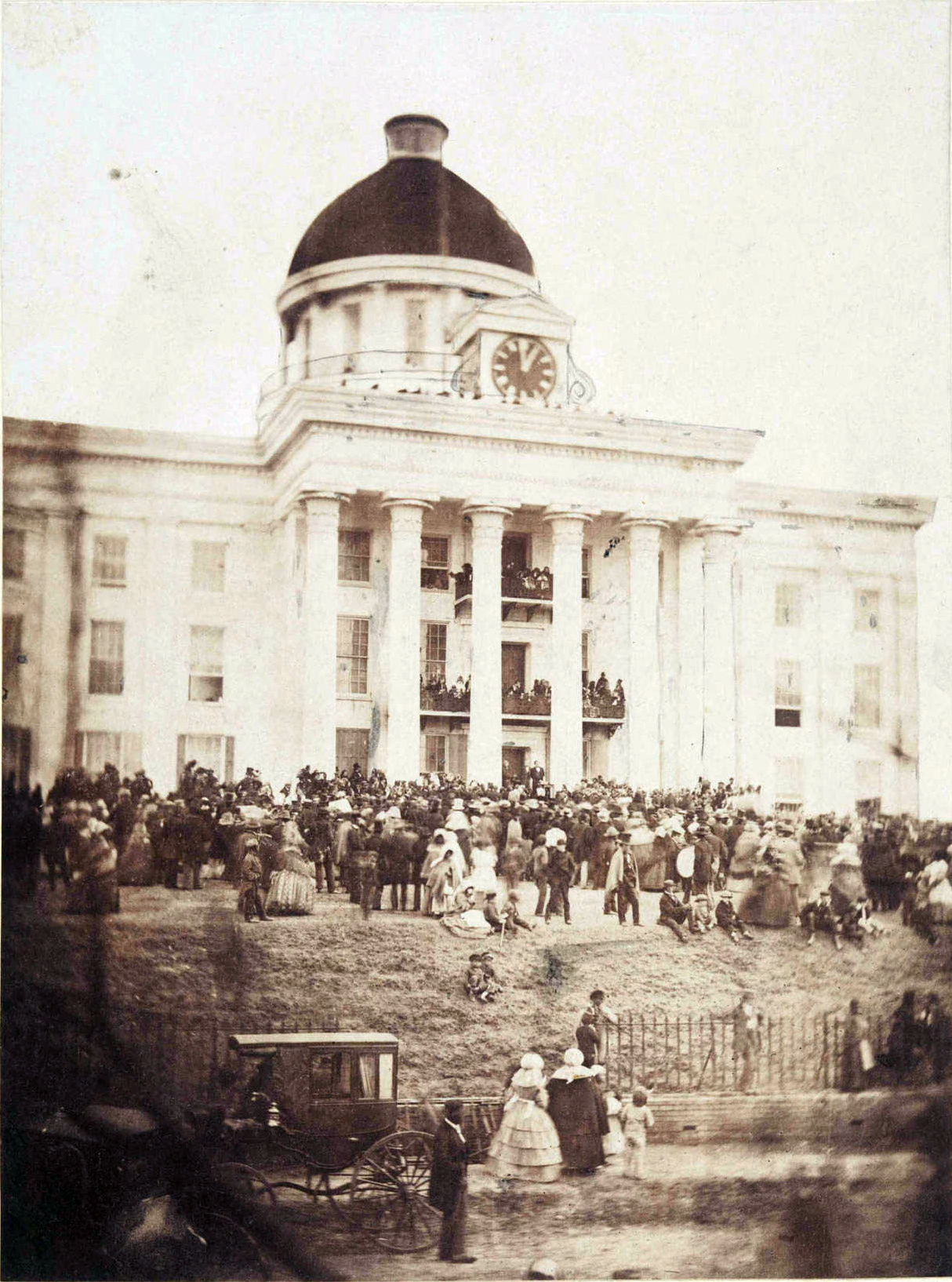
The inauguration of Jefferson Davis in Montgomery, Alabama

The first secession state conventions from the Deep South sent representatives to the Montgomery Convention in Alabama on February 4, 1861. A provisional government was established. The new provisional Confederate President Jefferson Davis issued a call for 100,000 men from the states' militias to defend the newly formed Confederacy. All federal property was seized, including gold bullion and coining dies at the U.S. mints. The Confederate capital was moved from Montgomery to Richmond, Virginia, in May 1861. On February 22, 1862, Davis was inaugurated as president with a term of six years.

The Confederate administration pursued a policy of national territorial integrity, continuing earlier state efforts in 1860–1861 to remove U.S. government presence. This included taking possession of U.S. courts, custom houses, post offices, and, most notably, arsenals and forts. After the Confederate attack and capture of Fort Sumter in April 1861, Lincoln called up 75,000 of the states' militia to muster under his command. His purpose was to secure possession of U.S. properties throughout the South. The resistance at Fort Sumter signaled his change of policy from that of the Buchanan administration. Lincoln's response ignited a firestorm of emotion. The people of both North and South demanded war, with soldiers rushing to their colors in the hundreds of thousands.

Blue indicates the Union states and light blue Union-supporting slave states (border states) that primarily stayed in Union control, though Kentucky and Missouri had dual competing Confederate and Unionist governments. Red represents seceded states in rebellion, also known as the Confederate States of America. Uncolored areas were territories, with the exception of the Indian Territory, which is present-day Oklahoma.

Evolution of the Confederate States between December 1860 and July 1870

Secessionists argued that the United States Constitution was a contract among sovereign states that could be abandoned without consultation and each state had a right to secede. After intense debates and statewide votes, seven Deep South states passed secession ordinances by February 1861, while secession efforts failed in the other eight slave states.

The Confederacy expanded in May–July 1861 (with Virginia, Arkansas, Tennessee, North Carolina), and disintegrated in April–May 1865. It was formed by delegations from seven slave states of the Lower South that had proclaimed their secession. After the fighting began in April, four additional slave states seceded and were admitted. Later, two slave states that had not seceded (Missouri and Kentucky) and two territories were given seats in the Confederate Congress.

The Confederacy's establishment flowed from and deepened Southern nationalism, which prepared men to fight for "The Southern Cause". This "Cause" included support for states' rights, tariff policy, and internal improvements, but above all, cultural and financial dependence on the South's slavery-based economy. The convergence of race and slavery, politics, and economics raised South-related policy questions to the status of moral questions over, way of life, merging love of things Southern and hatred of things Northern. As the war approached, political parties split, and national churches and interstate families divided along sectional lines. According to historian John M. Coski:

The statesmen who led the secession movement were unashamed to explicitly cite the defense of slavery as their prime motive.... Acknowledging the centrality of slavery to the Confederacy is essential for understanding the Confederate.

Following South Carolina's unanimous 1860 secession vote, no other Southern states considered the question until 1861; when they did, none voted for secession unanimously. All had residents who cast significant numbers of Unionist votes. Voting to remain in the Union did not necessarily mean individuals sympathized with the North. Once fighting began, many who voted to remain in the Union accepted the majority decision and supported the Confederacy. Many writers have evaluated the Civil War as an American tragedy—a "Brothers' War", pitting "brother against brother, father against son, kin against kin of every degree".

=== States ===
Initially, some secessionists hoped for a peaceful departure. Moderates in the Confederate Constitutional Convention included a provision against importation of slaves from Africa to appeal to the Upper South. Non-slave states might join, but the radicals secured a two-thirds requirement in both houses of Congress to accept them.

Seven states declared their secession from the United States before Lincoln took office on March 4, 1861. After the Confederate attack on Fort Sumter on April 12, 1861, and Lincoln's subsequent call for troops, four more states declared their secession.

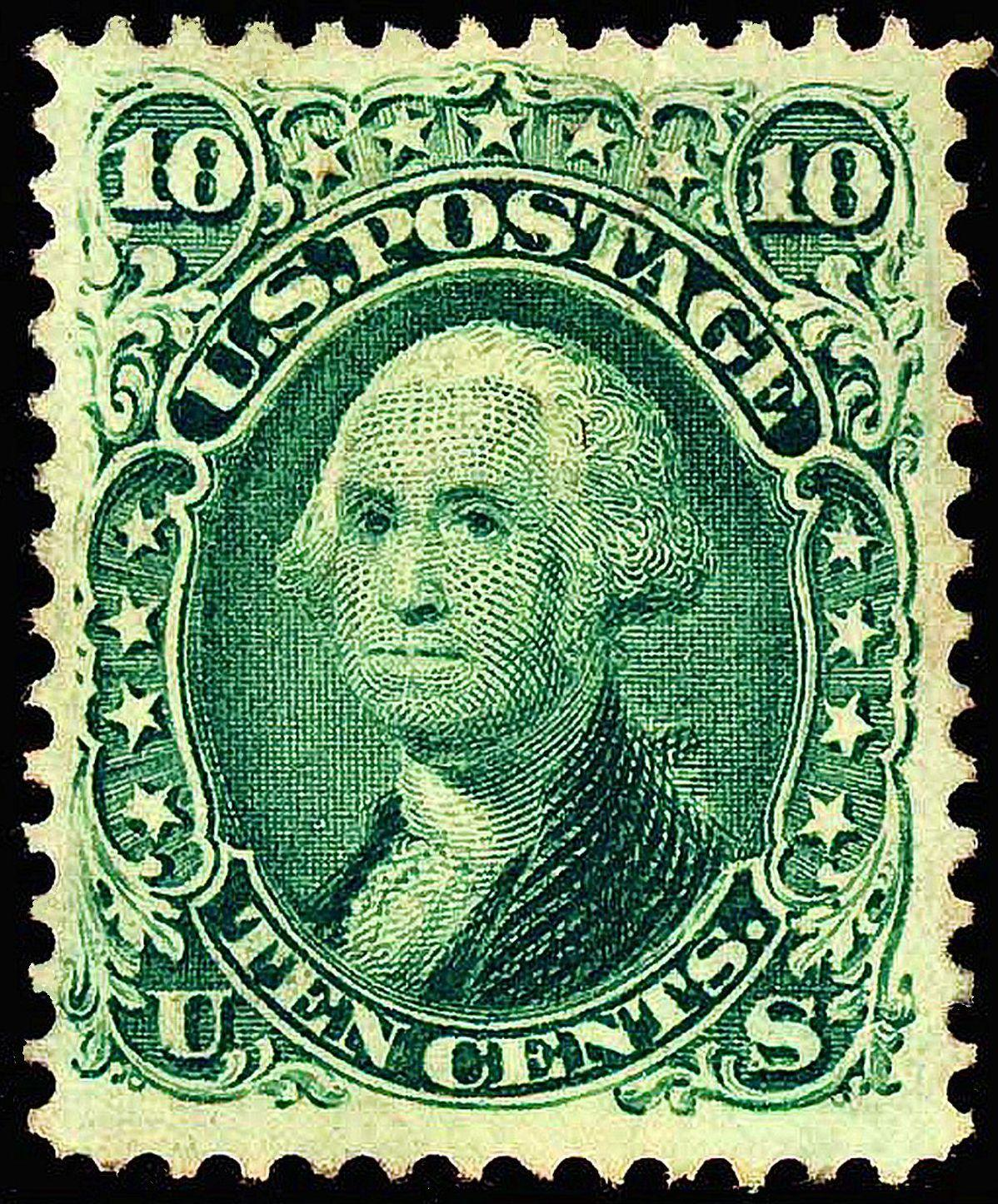
10-cent U.S. 1861

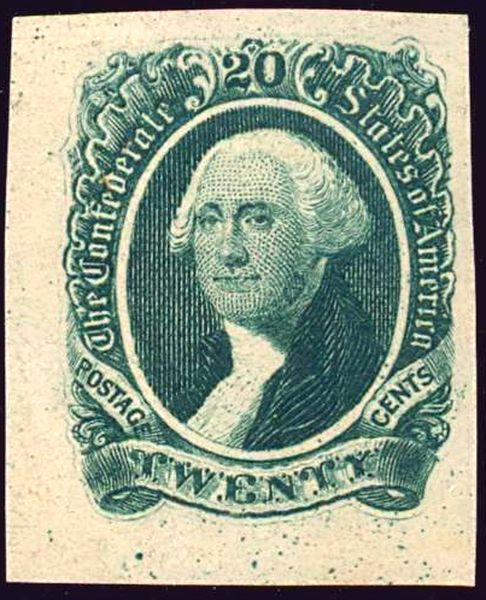
20-cent C.S. 1863

Both sides honored George Washington as a Founding Father by using a portrait of him on a postage stamp.

Kentucky declared neutrality, but after Confederate troops moved in, the state legislature asked for Union troops to drive them out. Delegates from 68 Kentucky counties were sent to the Russellville Convention that signed an Ordinance of Secession. Kentucky was admitted into the Confederacy on December 10, 1861, with Bowling Green as its first capital. Early in the war, the Confederacy controlled more than half of Kentucky but largely lost control in 1862. The splinter Confederate government of Kentucky relocated to accompany western Confederate armies and never controlled the state population after 1862. By the end of the war, 90,000 Kentuckians had fought for the Union, compared to 35,000 for the Confederacy.

In Missouri, a constitutional convention was approved and delegates elected. The convention rejected secession 89–1 on March 19, 1861. The governor maneuvered to take control of the St. Louis Arsenal and restrict federal military movements. This led to a confrontation, and in June federal forces drove him and the General Assembly from Jefferson City. The executive committee of the convention called the members together in July, and declared the state offices vacant and appointed a Unionist interim state government. The exiled governor called a rump session of the former General Assembly together in Neosho and, on October 31, 1861, it passed an ordinance of secession. The Confederate government of Missouri effectively controlled only southern Missouri early in the war. It had its capital at Neosho, then Cassville, before being driven out of the state. For the remainder of the war, it operated as a government in exile at Marshall, Texas.

Not having seceded, neither Kentucky nor Missouri was declared in rebellion in Lincoln's Emancipation Proclamation. The Confederacy recognized the pro-Confederate claimants in Kentucky (December 10, 1861) and Missouri (November 28, 1861) and laid claim to those states, granting them congressional representation and adding two stars to the Confederate flag. Voting for the representatives was done mostly by Confederate soldiers from Kentucky and Missouri.

Some Southern Unionists blamed Lincoln's call for troops as the precipitating event for the second wave of secessions. Historian James McPherson argues such claims have "a self-serving quality" and regards them as misleading:

As the telegraph chattered reports of the attack on Sumter April 12 and its surrender next day, huge crowds poured into the streets of Richmond, Raleigh, Nashville, and other upper South cities to celebrate this victory over the Yankees. These crowds waved Confederate flags and cheered the glorious cause of southern independence. They demanded that their own states join the cause. Scores of demonstrations took place from April 12 to 14, before Lincoln issued his call for troops. Many conditional unionists were swept along by this powerful tide of southern nationalism; others were cowed into silence.

Historian Daniel W. Crofts disagrees with McPherson:

The bombardment of Fort Sumter, by itself, did not destroy Unionist majorities in the upper South. Because only three days elapsed before Lincoln issued the proclamation, the two events viewed retrospectively, appear almost simultaneous. Nevertheless, close examination of contemporary evidence ... shows that the proclamation had a far more decisive impact. ... Many concluded ... that Lincoln had deliberately chosen "to drive off all the Slave states, in order to make war on them and annihilate slavery".

Richard N. Current concluded:

In short, it appears that Lincoln, when he decided to send the Sumter expedition, considered hostilities to be probable. It also appears, however, that he believed an unopposed and peaceable provisioning to be at least barely possible ... He thought hostilities would be the likely result, and he was determined that, if they should be, they must clearly be initiated by the Confederates. "To say that Lincoln meant that the first shot would be fired by the other side if a first shot was fired, ... is not to say that he maneuvered to have the first shot fired."

The order of secession resolutions and dates are:

1. South Carolina (December 20, 1860)
2. Mississippi (January 9, 1861)
3. Florida (January 10)
4. Alabama (January 11)
5. Georgia (January 19)
6. Louisiana (January 26)
7. Texas (February 1; referendum February 23)
- Inauguration of President Lincoln, March 4
- Bombardment of Fort Sumter (April 12) and President Lincoln's call-up (April 15)

8. Virginia (April 17; referendum May 23, 1861)
9. Arkansas (May 6)
10. Tennessee (May 7; referendum June 8)
11. North Carolina (May 20)

In Virginia, the populous counties along the Ohio and Pennsylvania borders rejected the Confederacy. Unionists held a Convention in Wheeling in June 1861, establishing a "restored government" with a rump legislature, but sentiment in the region remained deeply divided. In the 50 counties that would make up the state of West Virginia, voters from 24 counties had voted for disunion in Virginia's May 23 referendum on the ordinance of secession. In the 1860 election, "Constitutional Democrat" Breckenridge had outpolled "Constitutional Unionist" Bell in the 50 counties by 1,900 votes, 44% to 42%. The counties simultaneously supplied over 20,000 soldiers to each side of the conflict. Representatives for most counties were seated in both state legislatures at Wheeling and at Richmond for the duration of the war.

Attempts to secede from the Confederacy by counties in East Tennessee were checked by martial law. Although slaveholding Delaware and Maryland did not secede, citizens exhibited divided loyalties. Regiments of Marylanders fought in Lee's Army of Northern Virginia. Overall, 24,000 men from Maryland joined Confederate forces, compared to 63,000 who joined Union forces. Delaware never produced a full regiment for the Confederacy, but neither did it emancipate slaves as did Missouri and West Virginia. District of Columbia citizens made no attempts to secede and through the war, referendums sponsored by Lincoln approved compensated emancipation and slave confiscation from "disloyal citizens".

=== Territories ===
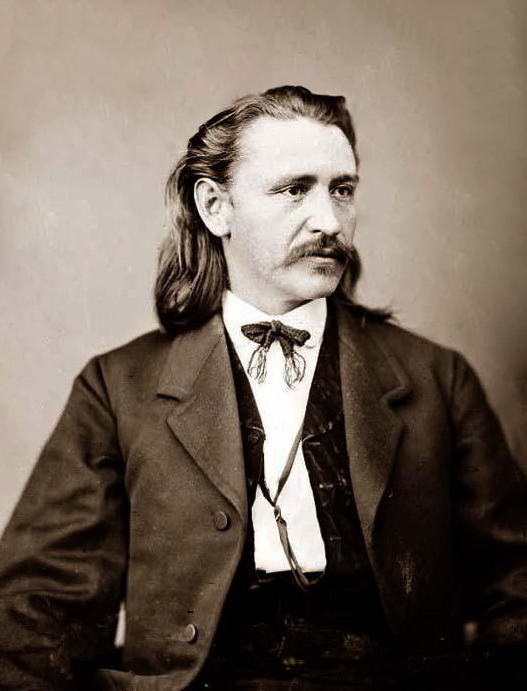
Elias Boudinot, a Cherokee secessionist and Confederate Representative in the Indian Territory of present-day Oklahoma

Citizens at Mesilla and Tucson in the southern part of New Mexico Territory formed a secession convention, which voted to join the Confederacy on March 16, 1861, and appointed Dr. Lewis S. Owings as the new territorial governor. They won the Battle of Mesilla and established a territorial government with Mesilla serving as its capital. The Confederacy proclaimed the Confederate Arizona Territory on February 14, 1862, north to the 34th parallel. Marcus H. MacWillie served in both Confederate Congresses as Arizona's delegate. In 1862, the Confederate New Mexico campaign to take the northern half of the U.S. territory failed and the Confederate territorial government in exile relocated to San Antonio, Texas.

Confederate supporters in the trans-Mississippi west claimed portions of the Indian Territory after the US evacuated the federal forts and installations. Over half of the American Indian troops participating in the War from the Indian Territory supported the Confederacy. On July 12, 1861, the Confederate government signed a treaty with both the Choctaw and Chickasaw Indian nations. After several battles, Union armies took control of the territory.

The Indian Territory never formally joined the Confederacy, but did receive representation in the Congress. Many Indians from the Territory were integrated into regular Confederate Army units. After 1863, the tribal governments sent representatives to the Confederate Congress: Elias Cornelius Boudinot representing the Cherokee and Samuel Benton Callahan representing the Seminole and Creek. The Cherokee Nation aligned with the Confederacy. They practiced and supported slavery, opposed abolition, and feared their lands would be seized by the Union. After the war, the Indian Territory was disestablished, their black slaves were freed, and the tribes lost some of their lands.

=== Capitals ===
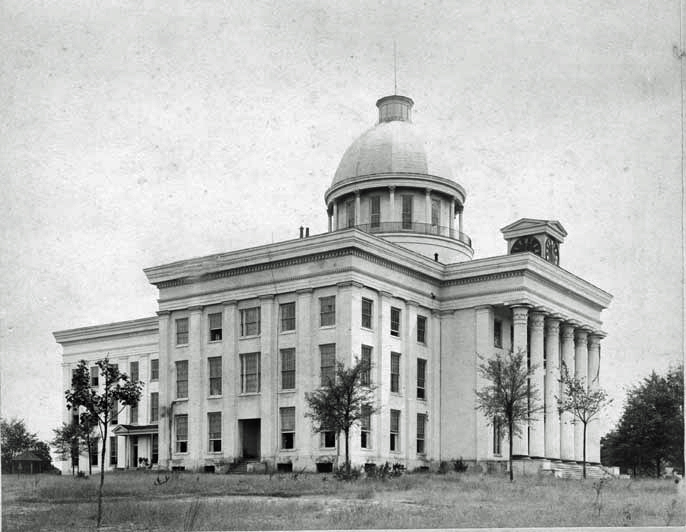
The first Capitol of the Confederacy in Montgomery, Alabama

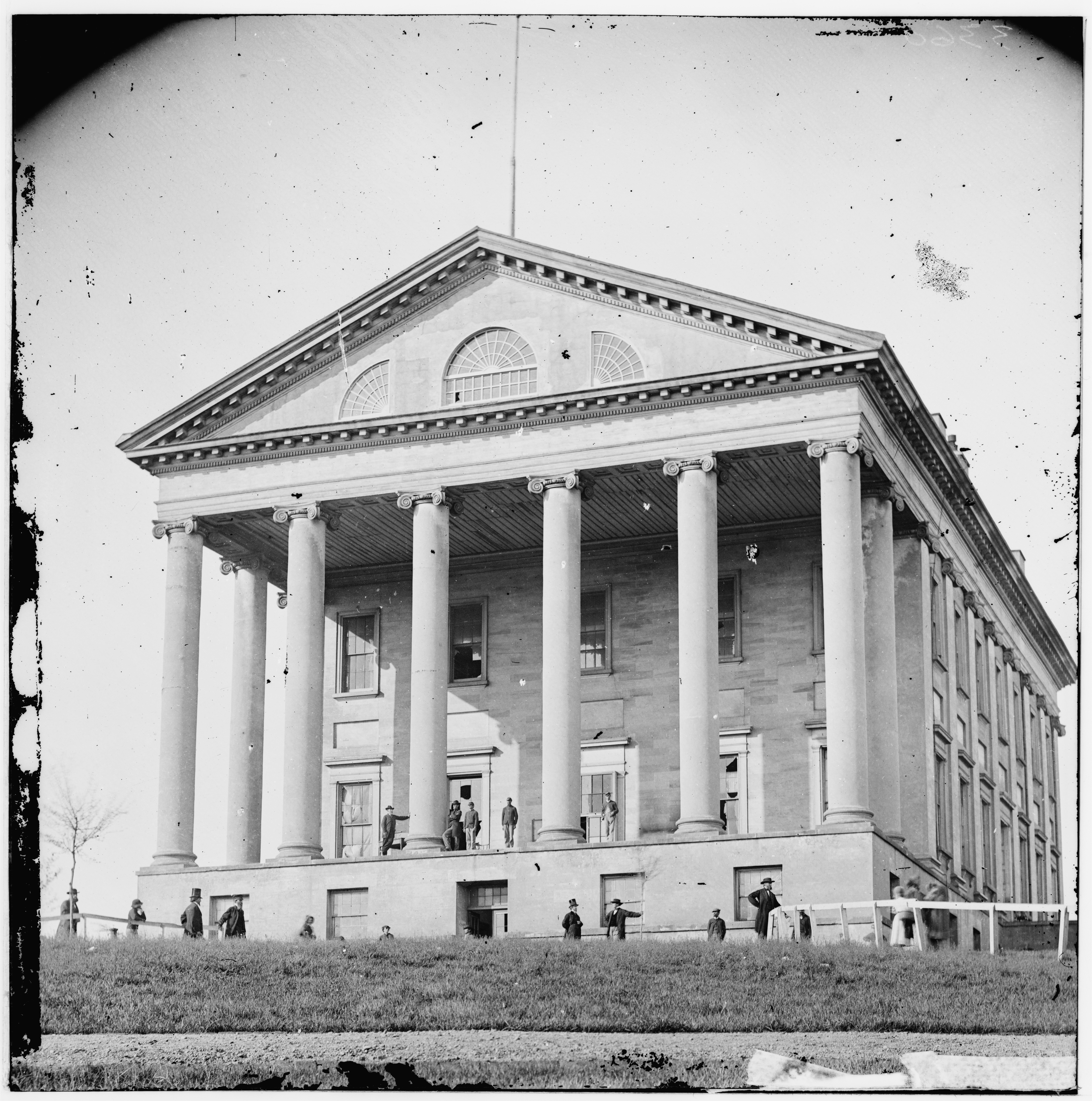
The second Capitol of the Confederacy in Richmond, Virginia

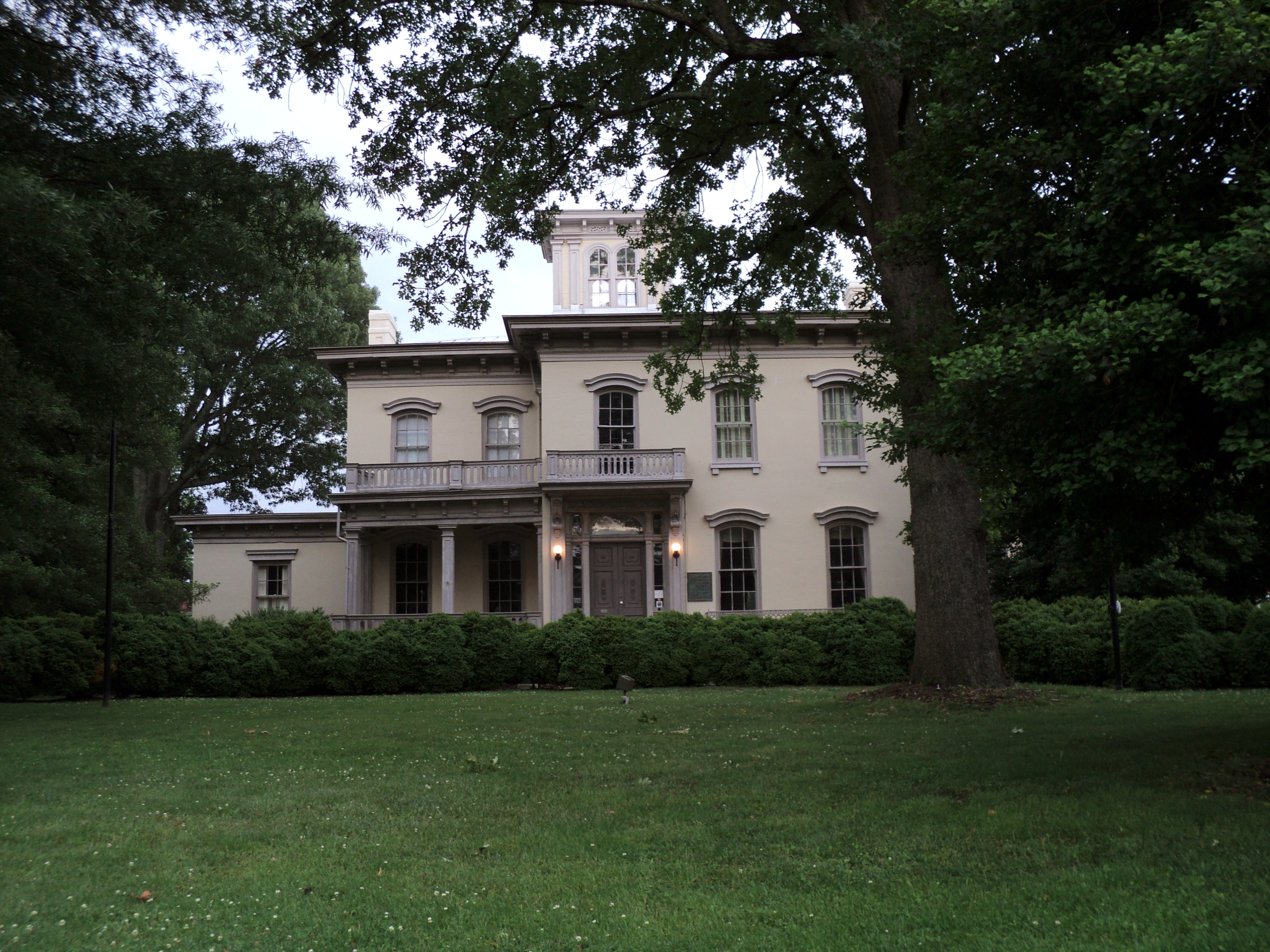
The William T. Sutherlin Mansion in Danville, Virginia was the temporary residence of Jefferson Davis and dubbed the "last Capitol of the Confederacy".

Montgomery, Alabama, served as capital of the Confederate States from February 4 until May 29, 1861, in the Alabama State Capitol. Six states created the Confederacy there on February 8, 1861. The Texas delegation was seated at the time, so it is counted in the "original seven" states of the Confederacy; it had no roll call vote until after its referendum made secession "operative". The Permanent Constitution was adopted there on March 12, 1861.

The permanent capital provided for in the Confederate Constitution called for a state cession of a 100 square mile district to the central government. Atlanta, which had not yet supplanted Milledgeville, Georgia, as its state capital, put in a bid noting its central location and rail connections, as did Opelika, Alabama, noting its strategically interior situation, rail connections and deposits of coal and iron.

Richmond, Virginia, was chosen for the interim capital at the Virginia State Capitol. The move was used by Vice President Stephens and others to encourage other border states to follow Virginia into the Confederacy. In the political moment it was a show of "defiance and strength". The war for Southern independence was surely to be fought in Virginia, but it also had the largest Southern military-aged white population, with infrastructure, resources, and supplies. The Davis Administration's policy was that "It must be held at all hazards."

The naming of Richmond as the new capital took place on May 30, 1861, and the last two sessions of the Provisional Congress were held there. As war dragged on, Richmond became crowded with training and transfers, logistics and hospitals. Prices rose dramatically despite government efforts at price regulation. A movement in Congress argued for moving the capital from Richmond. At the approach of federal armies in mid-1862, the government's archives were readied for removal. As the Wilderness Campaign progressed, Congress authorized Davis to remove the executive department and call Congress to session elsewhere in 1864 and again in 1865. Shortly before the end of the war, the Confederate government evacuated Richmond, planning to relocate further south. Little came of these plans before Lee's surrender. Davis and most of his cabinet fled to Danville, Virginia, which served as their headquarters for eight days.

== Diplomacy ==
During its four years, the Confederacy asserted its independence and appointed dozens of diplomatic agents abroad. None were recognized by a foreign government. The U.S. government regarded the Southern states as being in rebellion or insurrection and so refused any formal recognition of their status.

The U.S. government never declared war on those "kindred and countrymen" in the Confederacy but conducted its military efforts beginning with a presidential proclamation issued April 15, 1861. It called for troops to recapture forts and suppress what Lincoln later called an "insurrection and rebellion". Mid-war parleys between the two sides occurred without formal political recognition, though the laws of war predominantly governed military relationships on both sides of the conflict.

Once war with the United States began, the Confederacy pinned its hopes for survival on military intervention by the UK or France. The Confederate government sent James M. Mason to London and John Slidell to Paris. On their way in 1861, the U.S. Navy intercepted their ship, the Trent, and took them to Boston, an international episode known as the Trent Affair. The diplomats were eventually released and continued their voyage. However, their mission was unsuccessful; historians judge their diplomacy as poor. Neither secured diplomatic recognition for the Confederacy, much less military assistance.

The Confederates who had believed that "cotton is king", that is, that Britain had to support the Confederacy to obtain cotton, proved mistaken. The British had stocks to last over a year and had been developing alternative sources. The United Kingdom took pride in leading the end of the transatlantic slave trade. By 1833, the Royal Navy patrolled Middle Passage waters to prevent slave ships from reaching the Western Hemisphere. It was in London that the first World Anti-Slavery Convention had been held in 1840. Black abolitionist speakers toured England, Scotland, and Ireland, exposing the reality of America's chattel slavery and rebutting the Confederate position that blacks were "unintellectual, timid, and dependent", and "not equal to the white man...the superior race." Frederick Douglass, Henry Highland Garnet, Sarah Parker Remond, her brother Charles Lenox Remond, James W. C. Pennington, Martin Delany, Samuel Ringgold Ward, and William G. Allen all spent years in Britain, where fugitive slaves were safe and, as Allen said, there was an "absence of prejudice against color. Here the colored man feels himself among friends, and not among enemies". Most British public opinion was against the practice, with Liverpool seen as the primary base of Southern support.

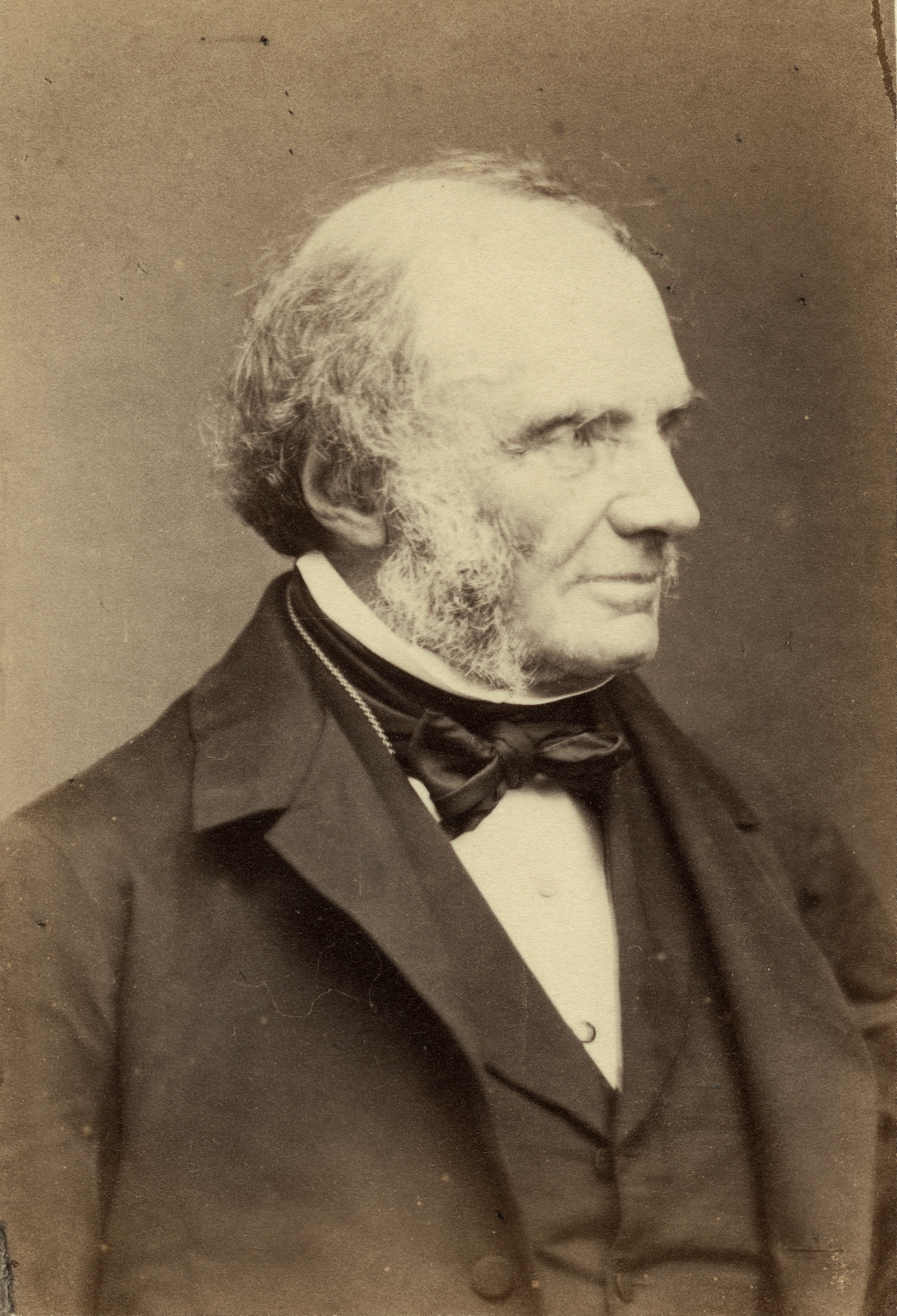
Lord John Russell, British foreign secretary and later prime minister, considered mediation in the "American War".

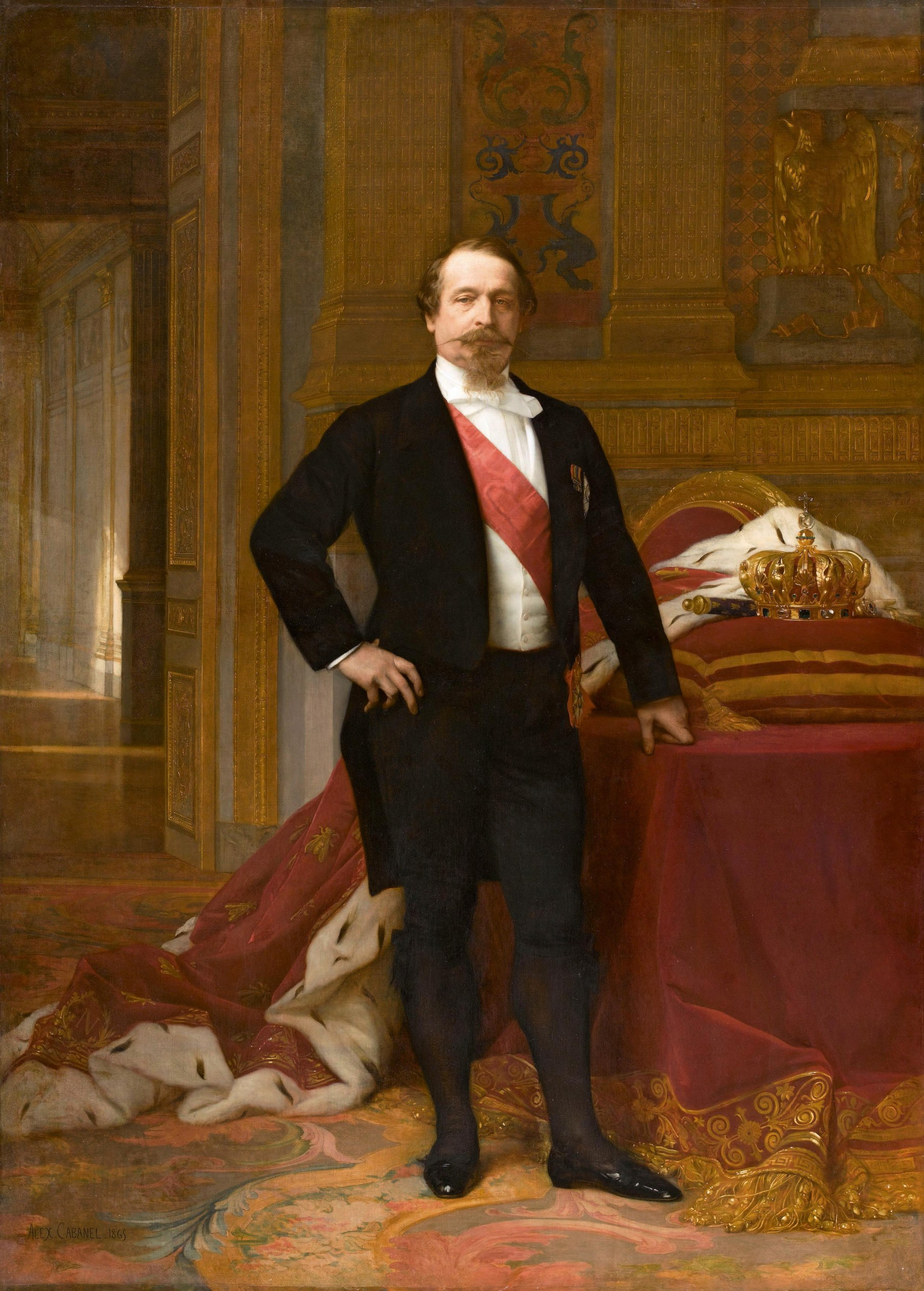
French Emperor Napoleon III sought joint French–British recognition of the Confederacy.

Throughout the early years of the war, British foreign secretary Lord John Russell, Emperor Napoleon III of France, and, to a lesser extent, British Prime Minister Lord Palmerston, showed interest in recognition of the Confederacy or at least mediation of the war. Chancellor of the Exchequer William Gladstone attempted unsuccessfully to convince Palmerston to intervene. By September 1862 the Union victory at the Battle of Antietam, Lincoln's preliminary Emancipation Proclamation and abolitionist opposition in Britain put an end to these possibilities. The cost to Britain of a war with the U.S. would have been high: the immediate loss of American grain shipments, the end of British exports to the U.S., and seizure of billions of pounds invested in American securities. War would have meant higher taxes in Britain, another invasion of Canada, and attacks on the British merchant fleet. In mid-1862, fears of a race war (like the Haitian Revolution of 1791–1804) led to the British considering intervention for humanitarian reasons.

John Slidell, the Confederate States emissary to the French Empire, succeeded in negotiating a loan of $15,000,000 from Erlanger and other French capitalists for ironclad warships and military supplies. The British government allowed the construction of blockade runners in Britain. Most of these were owned and operated by British financiers and shipowners, though a few were owned and operated by the Confederacy. The goal of the British investors was to acquire highly profitable cotton.

Several European nations maintained diplomats in place who had been appointed to the U.S., but no country appointed any diplomat to the Confederacy. Those nations recognized the Union and Confederate sides as belligerents. In 1863, the Confederacy expelled European diplomatic missions for advising their resident subjects to refuse to serve in the Confederate army. Both Confederate and Union agents were allowed to work openly in British territories. The Confederacy appointed Ambrose Dudley Mann as special agent to the Holy See in September 1863, but the Holy See never released a statement supporting or recognizing the Confederacy. In November 1863, Mann met Pope Pius IX and received a letter supposedly addressed "to the Illustrious and Honorable Jefferson Davis, President of the Confederate States of America"; Mann had mistranslated the address. In his report to Richmond, Mann claimed a great diplomatic achievement for himself, but Confederate Secretary of State Judah P. Benjamin told Mann it was "a mere inferential recognition, unconnected with political action or the regular establishment of diplomatic relations" and thus did not assign it the weight of formal recognition.

Nevertheless, the Confederacy was seen internationally as making a serious attempt at nationhood, and European governments sent military observers to assess whether there had been a de facto establishment of independence. These observers included Arthur Lyon Fremantle of the British Coldstream Guards, who entered the Confederacy via Mexico, Fitzgerald Ross of the Austrian Hussars, and Justus Scheibert of the Prussian Army. European travelers visited and wrote accounts for publication. Importantly in 1862, the Frenchman Charles Girard's Seven months in the rebel states during the North American War testified "this government ... is no longer a trial government ... but really a normal government, the expression of popular will". Fremantle went on to write in his book Three Months in the Southern States that he had:

not attempted to conceal any of the peculiarities or defects of the Southern people. Many persons will doubtless highly disapprove of some of their customs and habits in the wilder portion of the country; but I think no generous man, whatever may be his political opinions, can do otherwise than admire the courage, energy, and patriotism of the whole population, and the skill of its leaders, in this struggle against great odds. And I am also of opinion that many will agree with me in thinking that a people in which all ranks and both sexes display a unanimity and a heroism which can never have been surpassed in the history of the world, is destined, sooner or later, to become a great and independent nation.

French Emperor Napoleon III assured Confederate diplomat John Slidell that he would make a "direct proposition" to Britain for joint recognition. The Emperor made the same assurance to British members of Parliament John A. Roebuck and John A. Lindsay. Roebuck in turn publicly prepared a bill to submit to Parliament supporting joint Anglo-French recognition of the Confederacy. "Southerners had a right to be optimistic, or at least hopeful, that their revolution would prevail, or at least endure." Following the disasters at Vicksburg and Battle of Gettysburg in July 1863, the Confederates "suffered a severe loss of confidence in themselves" and withdrew into an interior defensive position. By December 1864, Davis considered sacrificing slavery in order to enlist recognition and aid from Paris and London; he secretly sent Duncan F. Kenner to Europe with a message that the war was fought solely for "the vindication of our rights to self-government and independence" and that "no sacrifice is too great, save that of honor". The message stated that if the French or British governments made their recognition conditional on anything at all, the Confederacy would consent to such terms. European leaders all saw that the Confederacy was on the verge of defeat.

The Confederacy's biggest foreign policy successes were with Brazil and Cuba, but these had little military import. Brazil represented the "peoples most identical to us in Institutions", in which slavery remained legal until the 1880s and the abolitionist movement was small. Confederate ships were welcome in Brazilian ports. After the war, Brazil was the primary destination of those Southerners who wanted to continue living in a slave society, where, as one immigrant remarked, Confederado slaves were cheap. The Captain–General of Cuba declared in writing that Confederate ships were welcome, and would be protected in Cuban ports. Historians speculate that if the Confederacy had achieved independence, it probably would have tried to acquire Cuba as a base of expansion.

== At war ==
=== Motivations of soldiers ===
Most soldiers who joined Confederate national or state military units joined voluntarily. Michael Perman (2010) says historians are of two minds on why millions of soldiers seemed so eager to fight, suffer and die over four years:

Some historians emphasize that Civil War soldiers were driven by political ideology, holding firm beliefs about the importance of liberty, Union, or state rights, or about the need to protect or to destroy slavery. Others point to less political reasons to fight, such as the defense of one's home and family, or the honor and brotherhood to be preserved when fighting alongside other men. Most historians agree that, no matter what a soldier thought about when he went to war, the experience of combat affected him profoundly and sometimes altered his reasons for continuing to fight.

=== Military strategy ===
Civil War historian E. Merton Coulter wrote that for those who would secure its independence, "The Confederacy was unfortunate in its failure to work out a general strategy for the whole war". Aggressive strategy called for offensive force concentration. Defensive strategy sought dispersal to meet demands of locally minded governors. The controlling philosophy evolved into a combination "dispersal with a defensive concentration around Richmond". The Davis administration considered the war purely defensive, a "simple demand that the people of the United States would cease to war upon us". Historian James M. McPherson writes that there is some truth to the charge that "Lee pursued a faulty military strategy that ensured Confederate defeat".

As the Confederate government lost control of territory in campaign after campaign, it was said that "the vast size of the Confederacy would make its conquest impossible". The enemy would be struck down by the same elements which so often debilitated or destroyed visitors and transplants in the South: heat exhaustion, sunstroke, and endemic diseases such as malaria and typhoid.

The Seal has symbols of an independent agricultural Confederacy surrounding an equestrian Washington, sword encased. (Note: The cash crops circling the Seal are wheat, corn, tobacco, cotton, rice and sugar cane. Like Washington's equestrian statue honoring him at Union Square NYC 1856, slaveholding Washington is pictured in his uniform of the Revolution securing American independence. Though armed, he does not have his sword drawn as he is depicted in the equestrian statue at the Virginia Capitol, Richmond, Virginia. The plates for the Seal were engraved in England but never received due to the Union Blockade.)

Early in the war, both sides believed that one great battle would decide the conflict; the Confederates won a surprise victory at the First Battle of Bull Run, also known as First Manassas (the name used by Confederate forces). It drove the Confederate people "insane with joy"; the public demanded a forward movement to capture Washington, relocate the Confederate capital there, and admit Maryland to the Confederacy. A council of war by the victorious Confederate generals decided not to advance against larger numbers of fresh federal troops in defensive positions. Davis did not countermand it. Following the Confederate incursion into Maryland halted at the Battle of Antietam in October 1862, generals proposed concentrating forces from state commands to re-invade the north. Nothing came of it. Again in mid-1863 at his incursion into Pennsylvania, Lee requested of Davis that Beauregard simultaneously attack Washington with troops taken from the Carolinas. But the troops there remained in place during the Gettysburg campaign.

The eleven states of the Confederacy were outnumbered by the North about four-to-one in military manpower. They were overmatched far more in military equipment, industrial facilities, railroads, and wagons supplying the front.

Confederates slowed the Union advances at heavy cost to the Southern infrastructure. The Confederates burned bridges, laid land mines in the roads, and made harbors inlets and inland waterways unusable with sunken mines (called "torpedoes" at the time). Coulter reports:

Rangers in twenty to fifty-man units were awarded 50% valuation for property destroyed behind Union lines, regardless of location or loyalty. As Federals occupied the South, objections by loyal Confederate concerning Ranger horse-stealing and indiscriminate scorched earth tactics behind Union lines led to Congress abolishing the Ranger service two years later.

The Confederacy relied on external sources for war materiels. The first came from trade with the enemy. "Vast amounts of war supplies" came through Kentucky, and thereafter, western armies were "to a very considerable extent" provisioned with illicit trade via federal agents and northern private traders. But that trade was interrupted in the first year of war by Admiral Porter's river gunboats as they gained dominance along navigable rivers north–south and east–west. Overseas blockade running then came to be of "outstanding importance". On April 17, President Davis called on privateer raiders, the "militia of the sea", to wage war on U.S. seaborne commerce. Despite noteworthy effort, over the course of the war the Confederacy was found unable to match the Union in ships and seamanship, materials and marine construction.

An inescapable obstacle to success in the warfare of mass armies was the Confederacy's lack of manpower, and sufficient numbers of disciplined, equipped troops in the field at the point of contact with the enemy. During the winter of 1862–63, Lee observed that none of his famous victories had resulted in the destruction of the opposing army. He lacked reserve troops to exploit an advantage on the battlefield as Napoleon had done. Lee explained, "More than once have most promising opportunities been lost for want of men to take advantage of them, and victory itself had been made to put on the appearance of defeat, because our diminished and exhausted troops have been unable to renew a successful struggle against fresh numbers of the enemy."

=== Armed forces ===
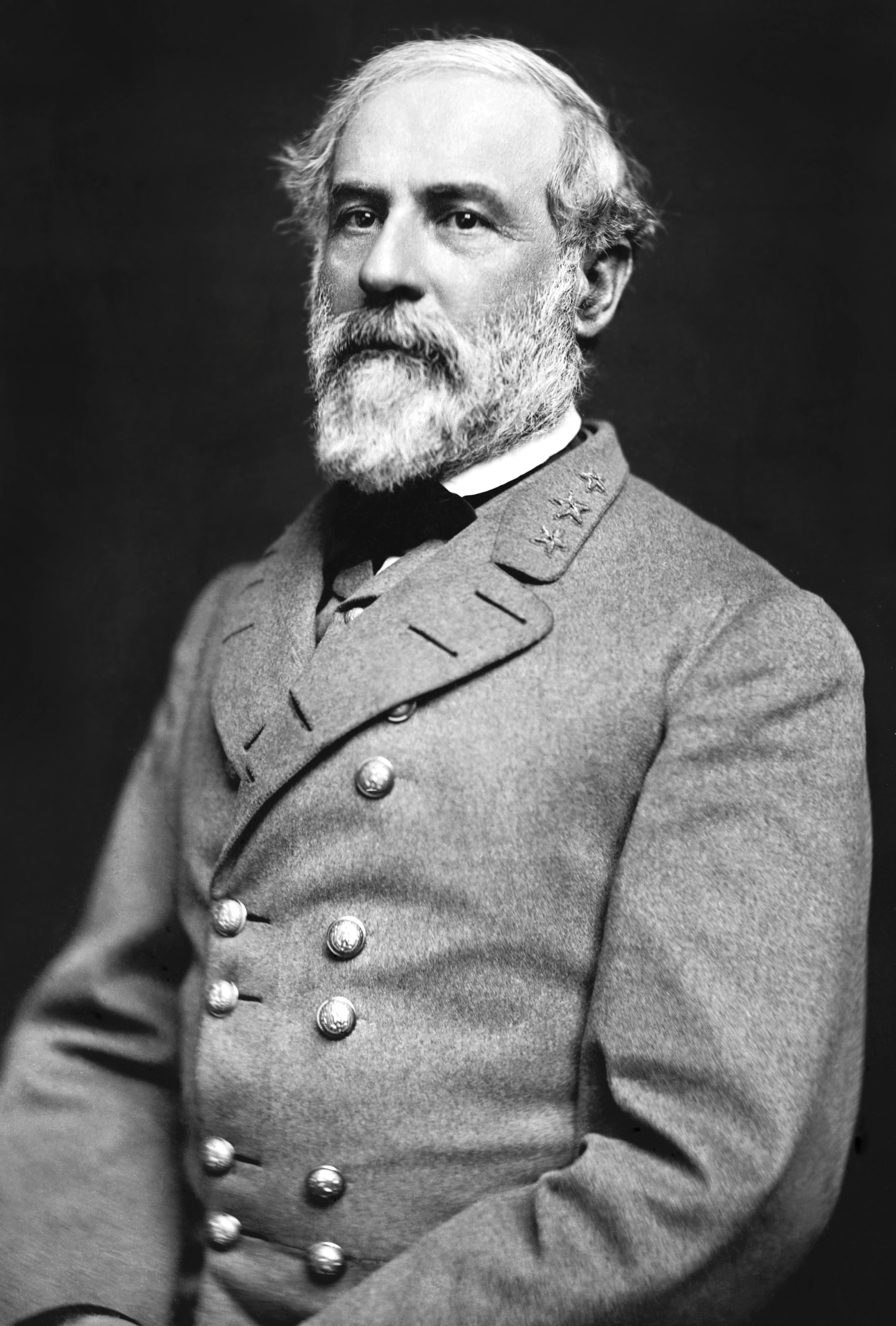
General Robert E. Lee, General in Chief (1865)

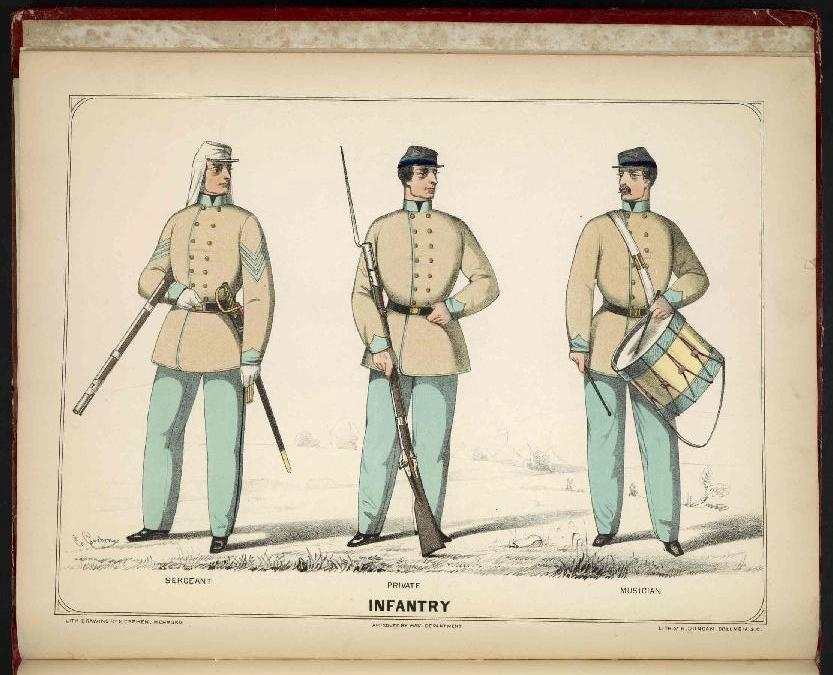
Uniform and dress of the army of the Confederate States.

The military armed forces of the Confederacy comprised three branches: Army, Navy and Marine Corps.

On February 28, 1861, the Provisional Confederate Congress established a provisional volunteer army and gave control over military operations and authority for mustering state forces and volunteers to the newly chosen Confederate president, Jefferson Davis. On March 1, 1861, on behalf of the Confederate government, Davis assumed control of the military situation at Charleston, South Carolina, where South Carolina state militia besieged Fort Sumter in Charleston harbor, held by a small U.S. Army garrison. By March 1861, the Provisional Confederate Congress expanded the provisional forces and established a more permanent Confederate States Army.

The total population of the Confederate Army is unknowable due to incomplete and destroyed Confederate records but estimates are between 750,000 and 1,000,000 troops. This does not include an unknown number of slaves pressed into army tasks, such as the construction of fortifications and defenses or driving wagons. Confederate casualty figures also are incomplete and unreliable, estimated at 94,000 killed or mortally wounded, 164,000 deaths from disease, and between 26,000 and 31,000 deaths in Union prison camps. One incomplete estimate is 194,026.

The Confederate military leadership included many veterans from the United States Army and United States Navy who had resigned their federal commissions and were appointed to senior positions. Many had served in the Mexican–American War (including Robert E. Lee and Jefferson Davis), but some such as Leonidas Polk (who graduated from West Point but did not serve in the Army) had little or no experience.

The Confederate officer corps consisted of men from both slave-owning and non-slave-owning families. The Confederacy appointed junior and field grade officers by election from the enlisted ranks. Although no Army service academy was established for the Confederacy, some colleges (such as The Citadel and Virginia Military Institute) maintained cadet corps that trained Confederate military leadership. A naval academy was established at Drewry's Bluff, Virginia in 1863, but no midshipmen graduated before the Confederacy's end.

Most soldiers were white males aged between 16 and 28; half were 23 or older by 1861. The Confederate Army was permitted to disband for two months in early 1862 after its short-term enlistments expired. The majority of those in uniform would not re-enlist after their one-year commitment, thus on April 16, 1862, the Confederate Congress imposed the first mass conscription on North American territory. (A year later, on March 3, 1863, the United States Congress passed the Enrollment Act.) Rather than a universal draft, the first program was a selective one with physical, religious, professional, and industrial exemptions. These became narrower as the battle progressed. Initially substitutes were permitted, but by December 1863 these were disallowed. In September 1862 the age limit was increased from 35 to 45 and by February 1864, all men under 18 and over 45 were conscripted to form a reserve for state defense inside state borders. By March 1864, the Superintendent of Conscription reported that all across the Confederacy, every officer in constituted authority, man and woman, "engaged in opposing the enrolling officer in the execution of his duties". Although challenged in the state courts, the Confederate State Supreme Courts routinely rejected legal challenges to conscription.

Many thousands of slaves served as personal servants to their owner, or were hired as laborers, cooks, and pioneers. Some freed blacks and men of color served in local state militia units of the Confederacy, primarily in Louisiana and South Carolina, but their officers deployed them for "local defense, not combat". Depleted by casualties and desertions, the military suffered chronic manpower shortages. In early 1865, the Confederate Congress, influenced by the public support by General Lee, approved the recruitment of black infantry units. Contrary to Lee's and Davis's recommendations, the Congress refused "to guarantee the freedom of black volunteers". No more than two hundred black combat troops were ever raised.

==== Raising troops ====
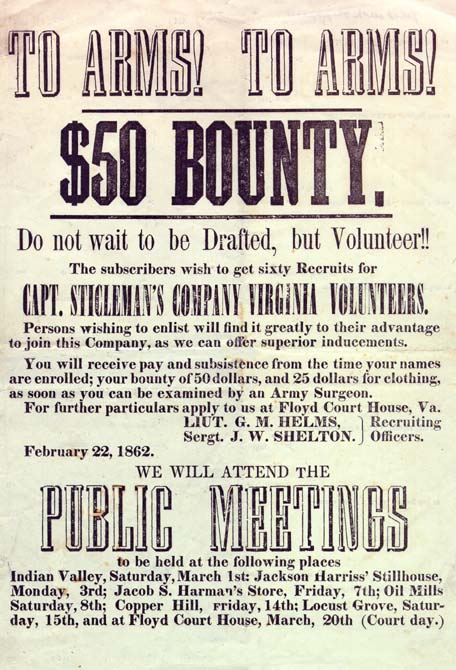
Recruitment poster: "Do not wait to be drafted". Under half re-enlisted.

The immediate onset of war meant that it was fought by the "Provisional" or "Volunteer Army". State governors resisted concentrating a national effort. Several wanted a strong state army for self-defense. Others feared large "Provisional" armies answering only to Davis. When filling the Confederate government's call for 100,000 men, another 200,000 were turned away by accepting only those enlisted "for the duration" or twelve-month volunteers who brought their own arms or horses.

It was important to raise troops; it was just as important to provide capable officers to command them. With few exceptions the Confederacy secured excellent general officers. Efficiency in the lower officers was "greater than could have been reasonably expected". As with the Union, political appointees could be indifferent. Otherwise, the officer corps was governor-appointed or elected by unit enlisted. Promotion to fill vacancies was made internally regardless of merit, even if better officers were immediately available.

Anticipating the need for more "duration" men, in January 1862 Congress provided for company level recruiters to return home for two months, but their efforts met little success on the heels of Confederate battlefield defeats in February. Congress allowed for Davis to require numbers of recruits from each governor to supply the volunteer shortfall. States responded by passing their own draft laws.

The veteran Confederate army of early 1862 was mostly twelve-month volunteers with terms about to expire. Enlisted reorganization elections disintegrated the army for two months. Officers pleaded with the ranks to re-enlist, but a majority did not. Those remaining elected majors and colonels whose performance led to officer review boards in October. The boards caused a "rapid and widespread" thinning out of 1,700 incompetent officers. Troops thereafter would elect only second lieutenants.

In early 1862, the popular press suggested the Confederacy required a million men under arms. But veteran soldiers were not re-enlisting, and earlier secessionist volunteers did not reappear to serve in war. One Macon, Georgia, newspaper asked how two million brave fighting men of the South were about to be overcome by four million northerners who were said to be cowards.

==== Conscription ====
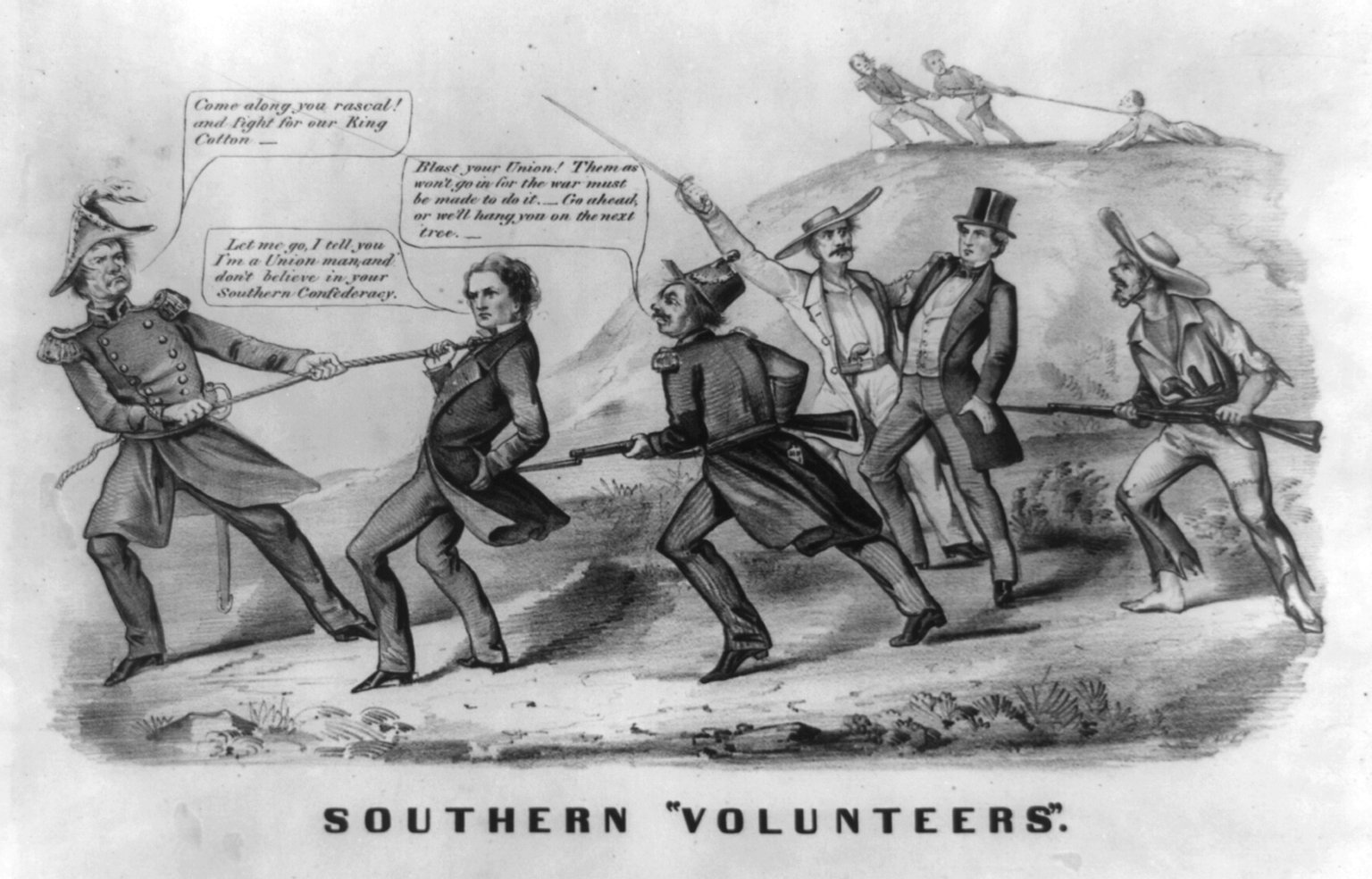
Southern Unionists throughout the Confederate States resisted the 1862 conscription

The Confederacy passed the first American law of national conscription on April 16, 1862. The white males of the Confederate States from 18 to 35 were declared members of the Confederate army for three years, and all men then enlisted were extended to a three-year term. They would serve only in units and under officers of their state. Those under 18 and over 35 could substitute for conscripts, in September those from 35 to 45 became conscripts. The cry of "rich man's war and a poor man's fight" led Congress to abolish the substitute system altogether in December 1863. All principals benefiting earlier were made eligible for service. By February 1864, the age bracket was made 17 to 50, those under eighteen and over forty-five to be limited to in-state duty.

Confederate conscription was not universal; it was a selective service. The First Conscription Act of April 1862 exempted occupations related to transportation, communication, industry, ministers, teaching and physical fitness. The Second Conscription Act of October 1862 expanded exemptions in industry, agriculture and conscientious objection. Exemption fraud proliferated in medical examinations, army furloughs, churches, schools, apothecaries and newspapers.

Rich men's sons were appointed to the socially outcast "overseer" occupation, but the measure was received in the country with "universal odium". The legislative vehicle was the controversial Twenty Negro Law that specifically exempted one white overseer or owner for every plantation with at least 20 slaves. Backpedaling six months later, Congress provided overseers under 45 could be exempted only if they held the occupation before the first Conscription Act. The number of officials under state exemptions appointed by state Governor patronage expanded significantly.

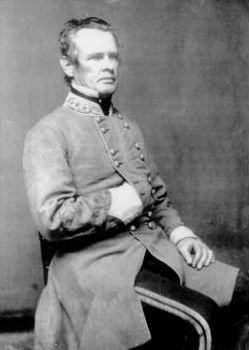
Gen. Gabriel J. Rains, Conscription Bureau chief, April 1862 – May 1863

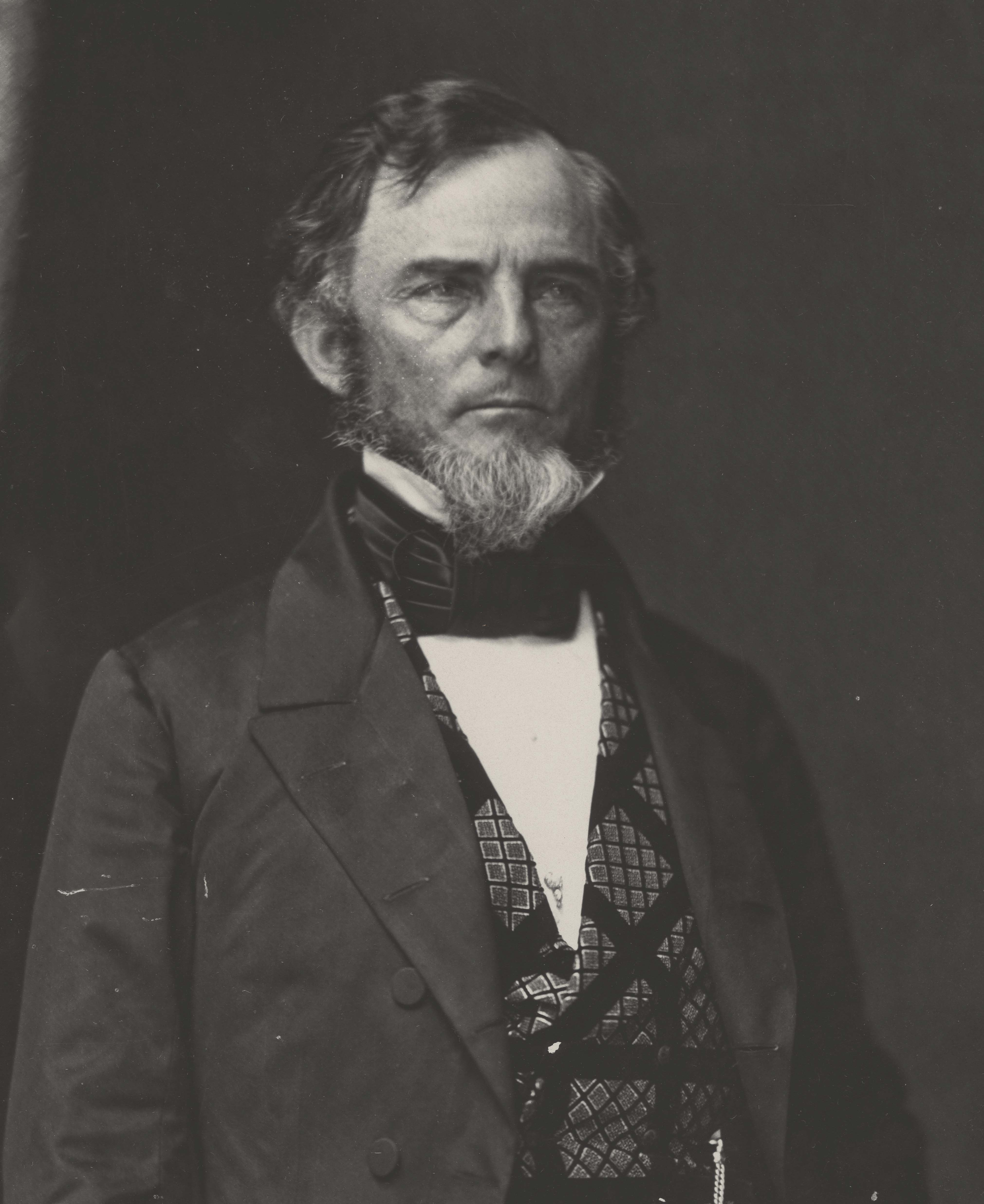
Gen. Gideon J. Pillow, military recruiter under Bragg, then J.E. Johnston

The Conscription Act of February 1864 "radically changed the whole system" of selection. It abolished industrial exemptions, placing detail authority in President Davis. As the shame of conscription was greater than a felony conviction, the system brought in "about as many volunteers as it did conscripts." Many men in otherwise "bombproof" positions were enlisted in one way or another, nearly 160,000 additional volunteers and conscripts in uniform. Still there was shirking. To administer the draft, a Bureau of Conscription was set up to use state officers, as state Governors would allow. It had a checkered career of "contention, opposition and futility". Armies appointed alternative military "recruiters" to bring in the out-of-uniform 17–50-year-old conscripts and deserters. Nearly 3,000 officers were tasked with the job. By late 1864, Lee was calling for more troops. "Our ranks are constantly diminishing by battle and disease, and few recruits are received; the consequences are inevitable." By March 1865 conscription was to be administered by generals of the state reserves calling out men over 45 and under 18 years old. All exemptions were abolished. These regiments were assigned to recruit conscripts ages 17–50, recover deserters, and repel enemy cavalry raids. The service retained men who had lost but one arm or a leg in home guards. Ultimately, conscription was a failure, and its main value was in goading men to volunteer.

The survival of the Confederacy depended on a strong base of civilians and soldiers devoted to victory. The soldiers performed well, though increasing numbers deserted in the last year of fighting, and the Confederacy never succeeded in replacing casualties as the Union could. The civilians, although enthusiastic in 1861–62, seem to have lost faith in the future of the Confederacy by 1864, and instead looked to protect their homes and communities. As George C. Rable explains, "This contraction of civic vision was more than a crabbed libertarianism; it represented an increasingly widespread disillusionment with the Confederate experiment."

=== Victories: 1861 ===
The American Civil War broke out in April 1861 with a Confederate victory at the Battle of Fort Sumter in Charleston.

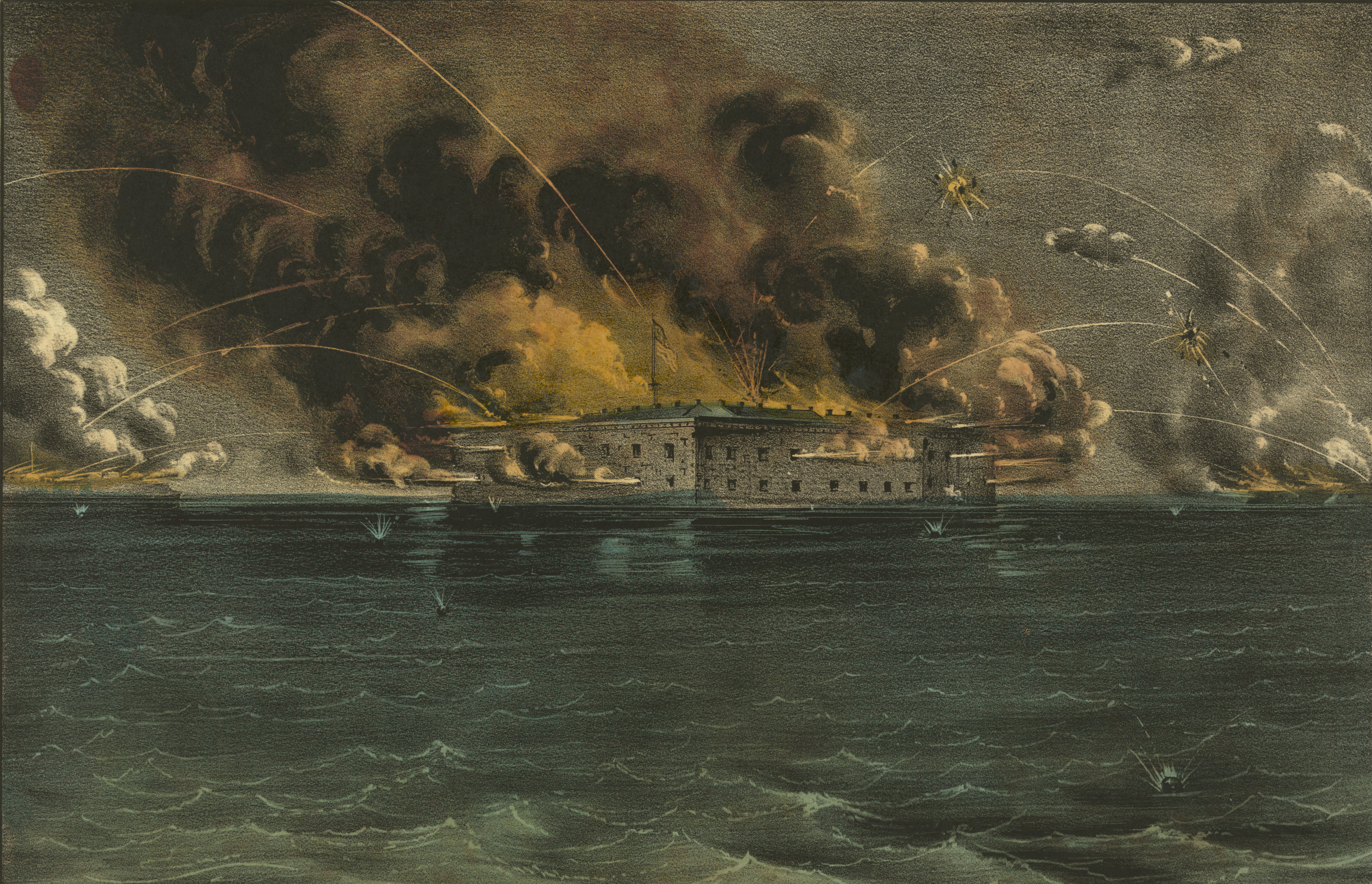
Bombardment of Fort Sumter, Charleston, South Carolina

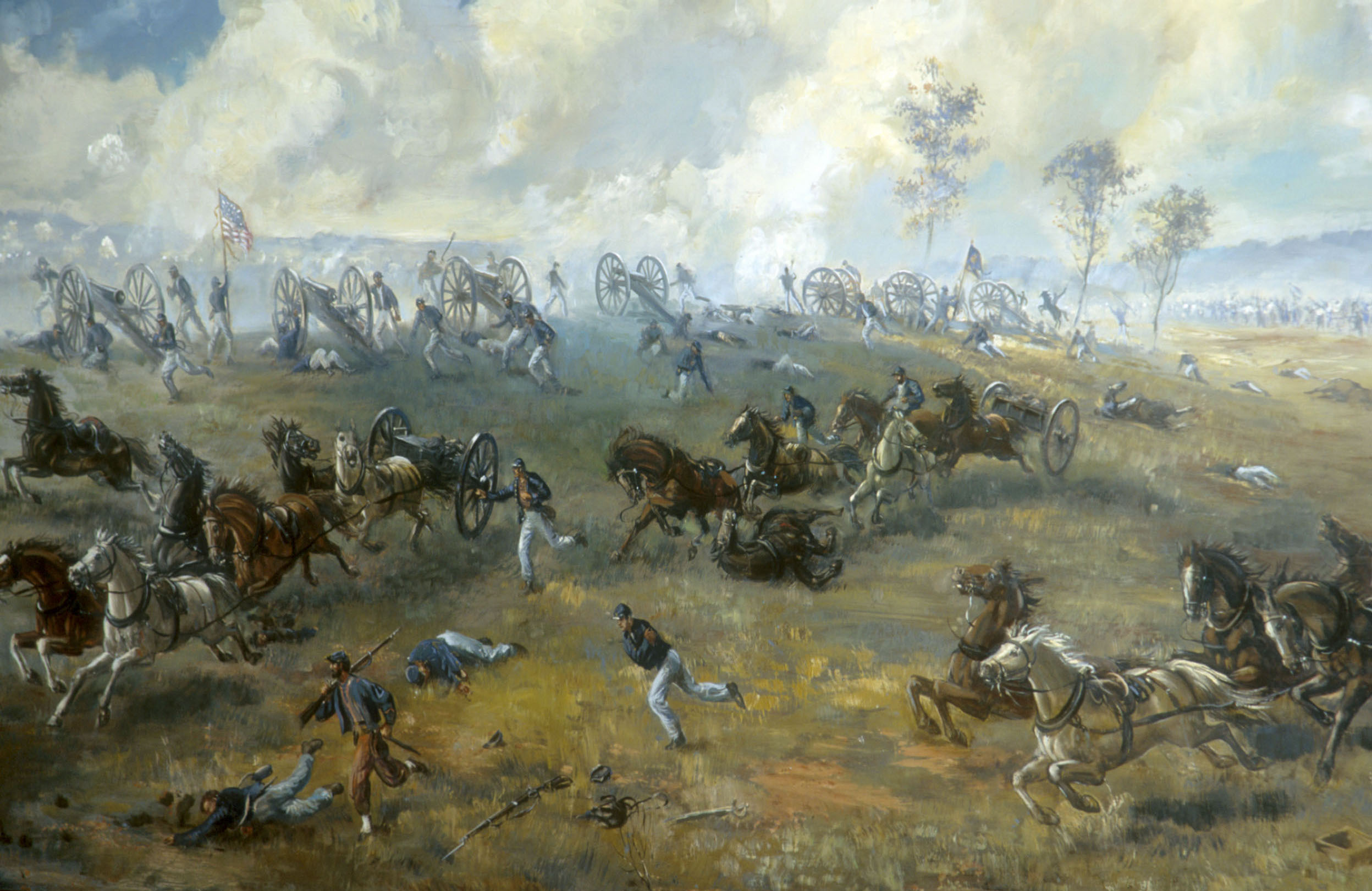
First Bull Run (First Manassas), the North's "Big Skedaddle"

In January, President James Buchanan had attempted to resupply the garrison with the steamship, Star of the West, but Confederate artillery drove it away. In March, President Lincoln notified South Carolina Governor Pickens that without Confederate resistance to the resupply there would be no military reinforcement without further notice, but Lincoln prepared to force resupply if it were not allowed. Confederate President Davis, in cabinet, decided to seize Fort Sumter before the relief fleet arrived, and on April 12, 1861, General Beauregard forced its surrender.

Following Sumter, Lincoln directed states to provide 75,000 militiamen for three months to recapture the Charleston Harbor forts and all other federal property. This emboldened secessionists in Virginia, Arkansas, Tennessee and North Carolina to secede rather than provide troops to march into neighboring Southern states. In May, federal troops crossed into Confederate territory along the entire border from the Chesapeake Bay to New Mexico. The first battles were Confederate victories at Big Bethel (Bethel Church, Virginia), First Bull Run (First Manassas) in Virginia July and in August, Wilson's Creek (Oak Hills) in Missouri. At all three, Confederate forces could not follow up their victory due to inadequate supply and shortages of fresh troops to exploit their successes. Following each battle, Federals maintained a military presence and occupied Washington, DC; Fort Monroe, Virginia; and Springfield, Missouri. Both North and South began training up armies for major fighting the next year. Union General George B. McClellan's forces gained possession of much of northwestern Virginia in mid-1861, concentrating on towns and roads; the interior was too large to control and became the center of guerrilla activity. General Robert E. Lee was defeated at Cheat Mountain in September and no serious Confederate advance in western Virginia occurred until the next year.

Meanwhile, the Union Navy seized control of much of the Confederate coastline from Virginia to South Carolina. It took over plantations and the abandoned slaves. Federals there began a war-long policy of burning grain supplies up rivers into the interior wherever they could not occupy. The Union Navy began a blockade of the major southern ports and prepared an invasion of Louisiana to capture New Orleans in early 1862.

=== Incursions: 1862 ===
The victories of 1861 were followed by a series of defeats east and west in early 1862. To restore the Union by military force, the federal strategy was to (1) secure the Mississippi River, (2) seize or close Confederate ports, and (3) march on Richmond. To secure independence, the Confederate intent was to (1) repel the invader on all fronts, costing him blood and treasure, and (2) carry the war into the North by two offensives in time to affect the mid-term elections.

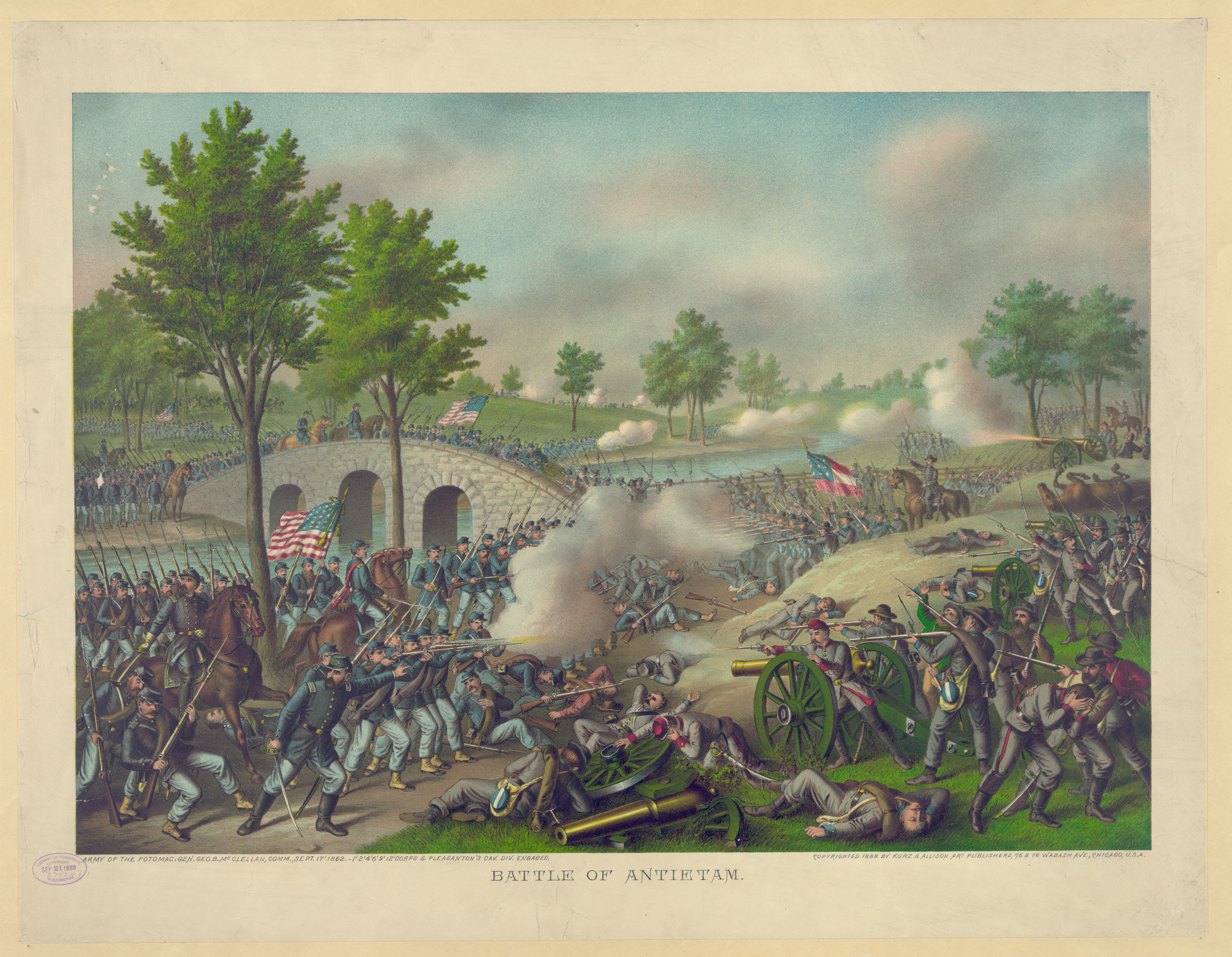
General Burnside halted at the bridge. Battle of Antietam (Sharpsburg).

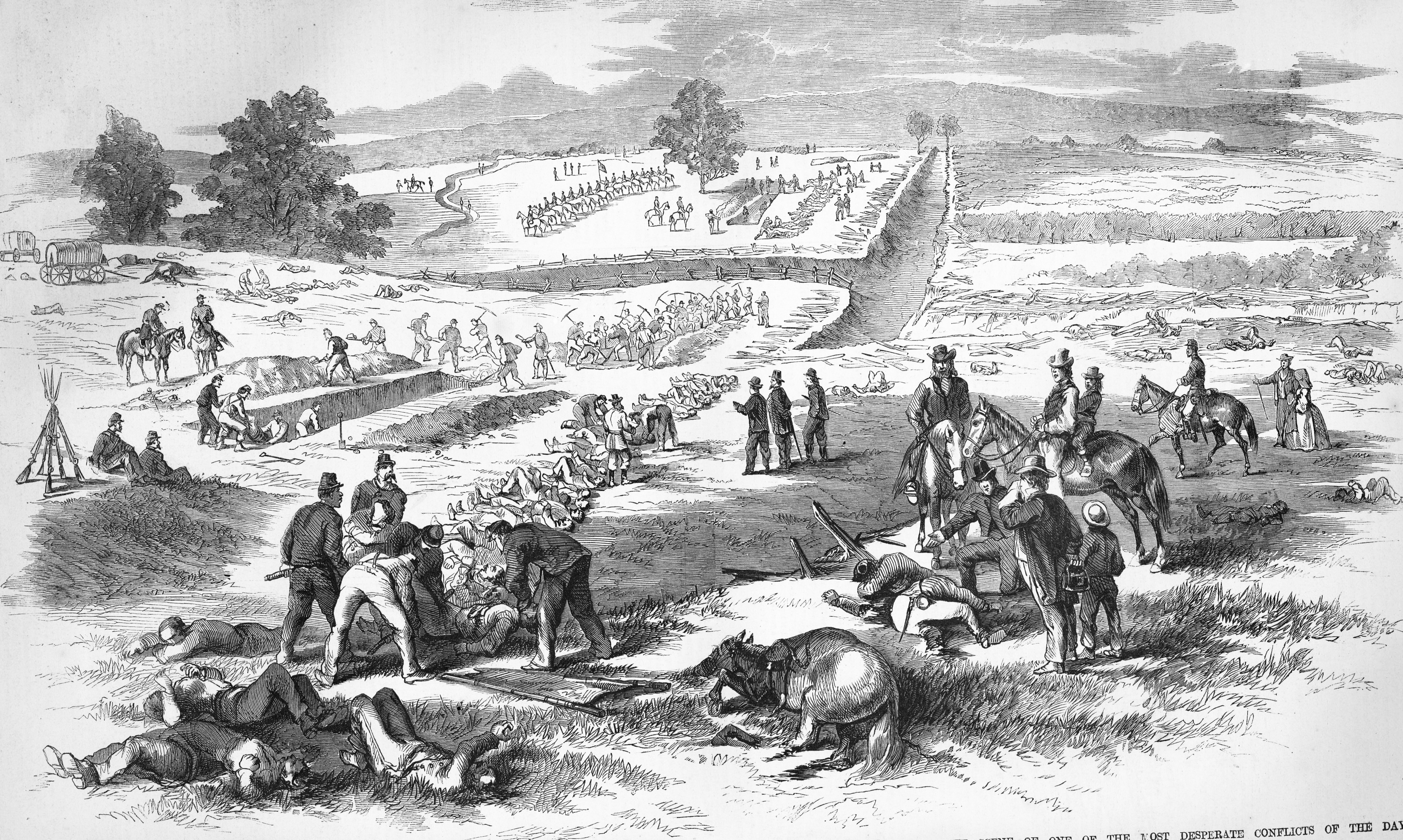
Burying Union dead. Antietam, Maryland.

Much of northwestern Virginia was under federal control. In February and March, most of Missouri and Kentucky were Union "occupied, consolidated, and used as staging areas for advances further South". Following the repulse of a Confederate counterattack at the Battle of Shiloh, Tennessee, permanent federal occupation expanded west, south and east. Confederate forces repositioned south along the Mississippi River to Memphis, Tennessee, where at the naval Battle of Memphis, its River Defense Fleet was sunk. Confederates withdrew from northern Mississippi and northern Alabama. New Orleans was captured on April 29 by a combined Army-Navy force under U.S. Admiral David Farragut, and the Confederacy lost control of the mouth of the Mississippi River. It had to concede extensive agricultural resources that had supported the Union's sea-supplied logistics base.

Although Confederates had suffered major reverses everywhere, as of the end of April the Confederacy still controlled territory holding 72% of its population. Federal forces disrupted Missouri and Arkansas; they had broken through in western Virginia, Kentucky, Tennessee and Louisiana. Along the Confederacy's shores, Union forces had closed ports and made garrisoned lodgments on every coastal Confederate state except Alabama and Texas. Although scholars sometimes assess the Union blockade as ineffectual under international law until the last few months of the war, from the first months it disrupted Confederate privateers, making it "almost impossible to bring their prizes into Confederate ports". British firms developed small fleets of blockade running companies, such as John Fraser and Company and S. Isaac, Campbell & Company while the Ordnance Department secured its own blockade runners for dedicated munitions cargoes.

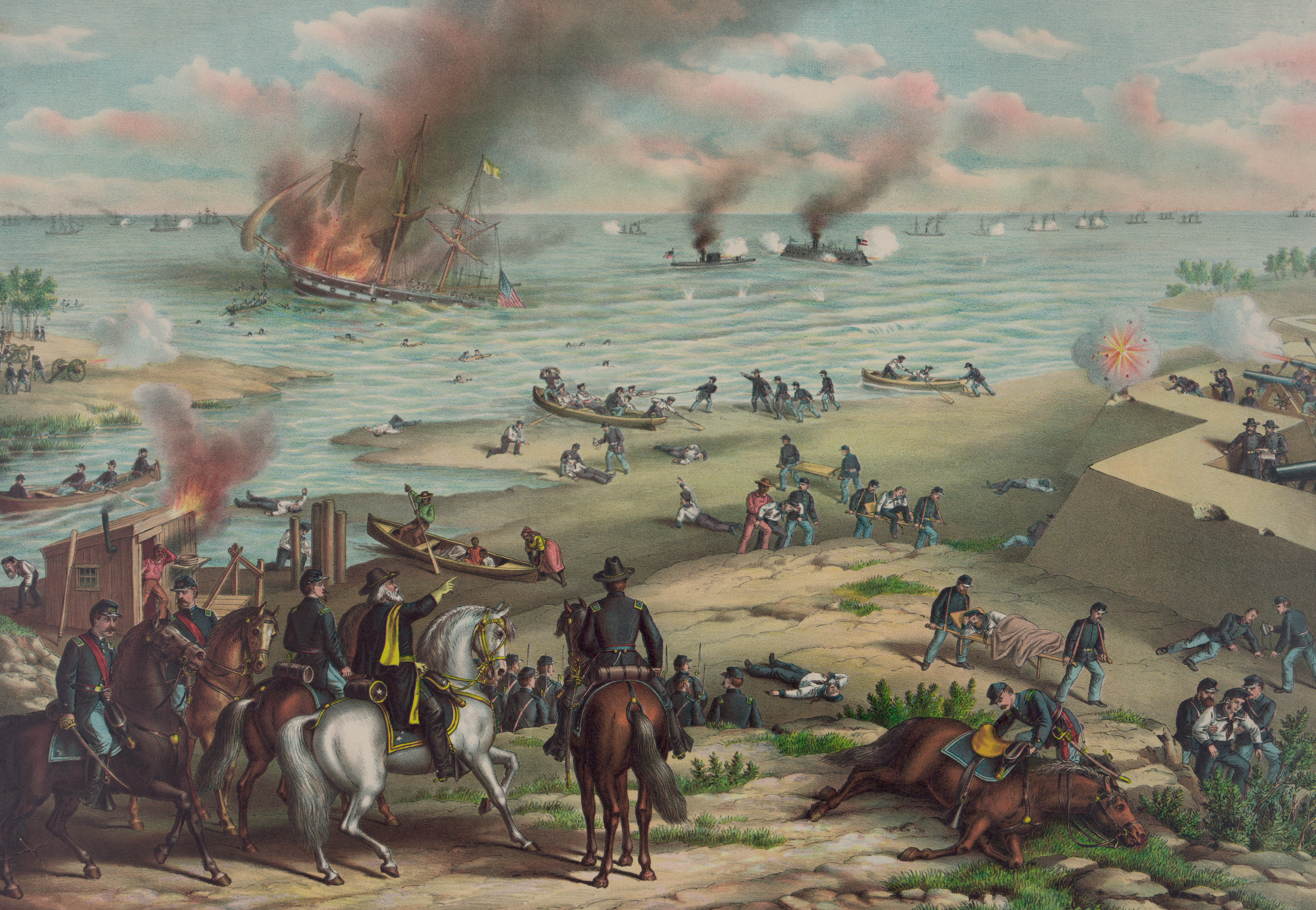
CSS Virginia at Hampton Roads, (Monitor and Merrimac) nearby destroyed Union warship

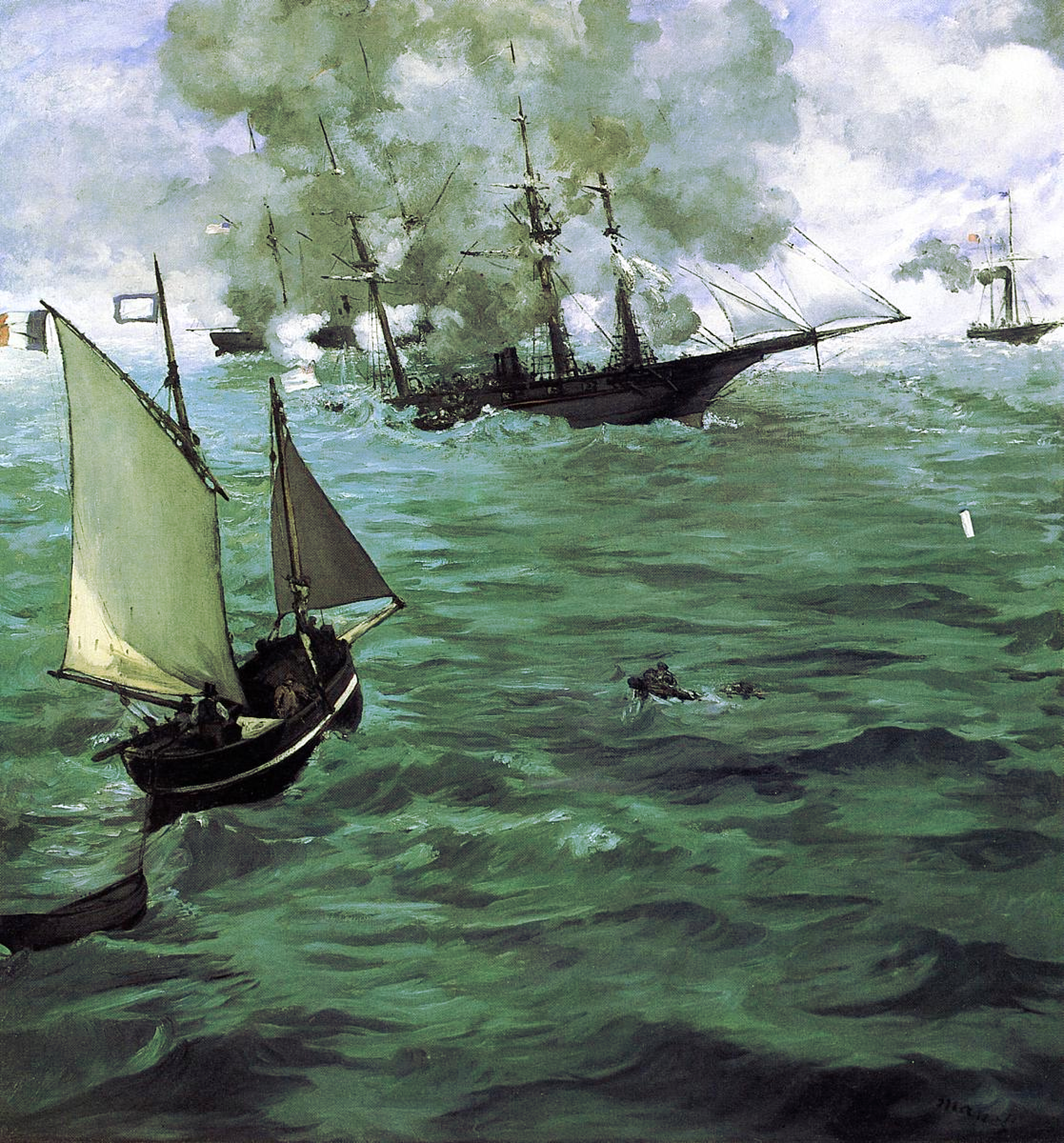
CSS Alabama off Cherbourg, location of the only cruiser engagement

During the Civil War fleets of armored warships were deployed for the first time in sustained blockades at sea. After some success against the Union blockade, in March the ironclad CSS Virginia was forced into port and burned by Confederates at their retreat. Despite several attempts mounted from their port cities, Confederate naval forces were unable to break the Union blockade. Attempts were made by Commodore Josiah Tattnall III's ironclads from Savannah in 1862 with the CSS Atlanta. Secretary of the Navy Stephen Mallory placed his hopes in a European-built ironclad fleet, but they were never realized. On the other hand, four new English-built commerce raiders served the Confederacy, and several fast blockade runners were sold in Confederate ports. They were converted into commerce-raiding cruisers, and manned by their British crews.

In the east, Union forces could not close on Richmond. General McClellan landed his army on the Lower Peninsula of Virginia. Lee subsequently ended that threat from the east, then Union General John Pope attacked overland from the north only to be repulsed at Second Bull Run (Second Manassas). Lee's strike north was turned back at Antietam MD, then Union Major General Ambrose Burnside's offensive was disastrously ended at Fredericksburg VA in December. Both armies then turned to winter quarters to recruit and train for the coming spring.

In an attempt to seize the initiative, reprove, protect farms in mid-growing season and influence U.S. Congressional elections, two major Confederate incursions into Union territory had been launched in August and September 1862. Both Braxton Bragg's invasion of Kentucky and Lee's invasion of Maryland were decisively repulsed, leaving Confederates in control of but 63% of its population. Civil War scholar Allan Nevins argues that 1862 was the strategic high-water mark of the Confederacy. The failures of the two invasions were attributed to the same irrecoverable shortcomings: lack of manpower at the front, lack of supplies including serviceable shoes, and exhaustion after long marches without adequate food. Also in September Confederate General William W. Loring pushed federal forces from Charleston, Virginia, and the Kanawha Valley in western Virginia, but lacking reinforcements Loring abandoned his position and by November the region was back in federal control.

=== Anaconda: 1863–1864 ===
The failed Middle Tennessee campaign was ended January 2, 1863, at the inconclusive Battle of Stones River (Murfreesboro), both sides losing the largest percentage of casualties suffered during the war. It was followed by another strategic withdrawal by Confederate forces. The Confederacy won a significant victory April 1863, repulsing the federal advance on Richmond at Chancellorsville, but the Union consolidated positions along the Virginia coast and the Chesapeake Bay.

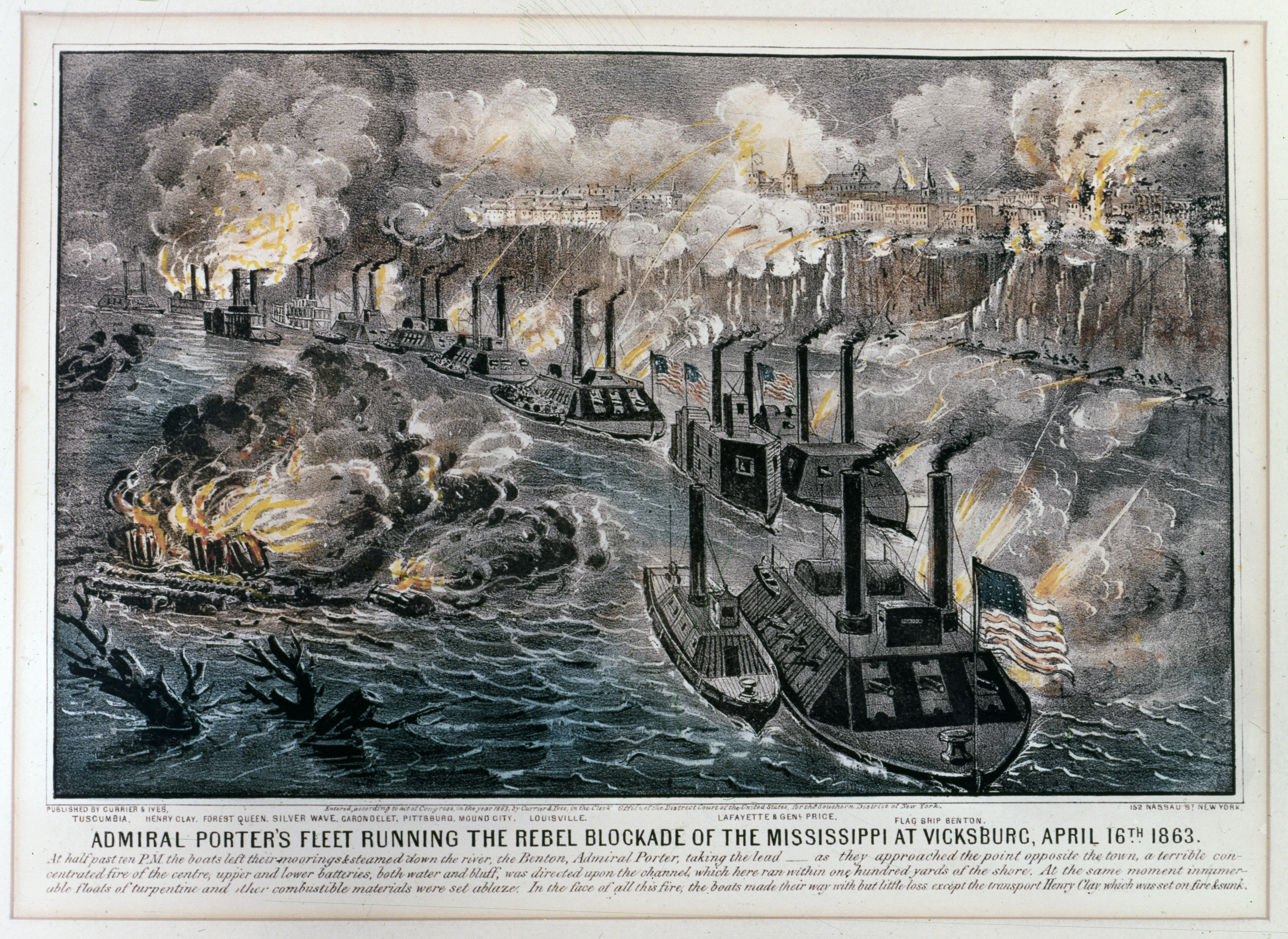
Bombardment of Vicksburg, Mississippi. Federal gunboats controlled rivers.

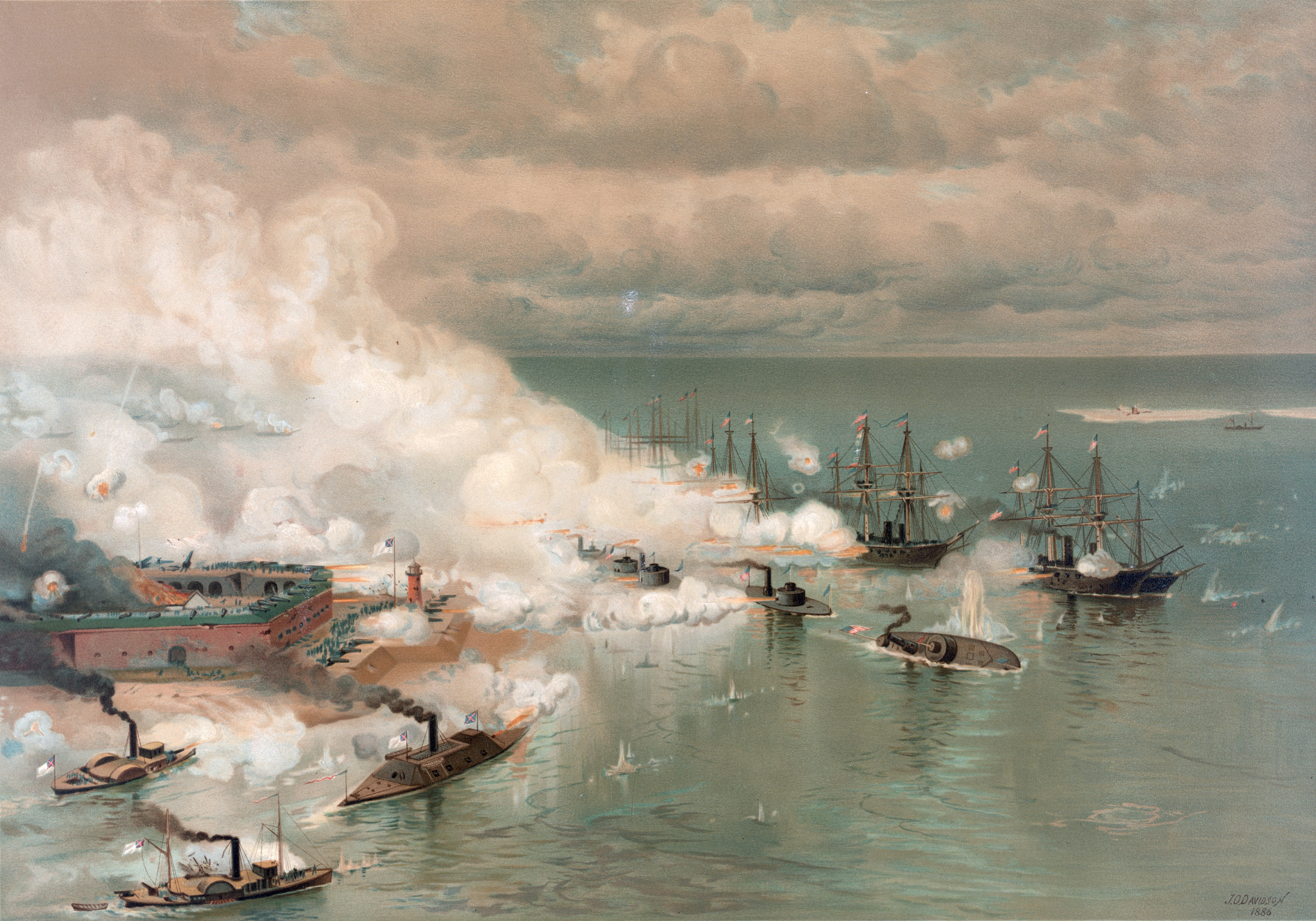
Closing of Mobile Bay, Alabama. The Union blockade ended trade with the Confederate states.

Without an effective answer to federal gunboats, river transport and supply, the Confederacy lost the Mississippi River following the capture of Vicksburg, Mississippi, and Port Hudson in July, ending Southern access to the trans-Mississippi West. July brought short-lived counters, Morgan's Raid into Ohio and the New York City draft riots. Robert E. Lee's strike into Pennsylvania was repulsed at Gettysburg, Pennsylvania despite Pickett's famous charge and other acts of valor. Southern newspapers assessed the campaign as "The Confederates did not gain a victory, neither did the enemy."

September and November left Confederates yielding Chattanooga, Tennessee, the gateway to the lower south. For the remainder of the war fighting was restricted inside the South, resulting in a slow but continuous loss of territory. In early 1864, the Confederacy still controlled 53% of its population, but it withdrew further to reestablish defensive positions. Union offensives continued with Sherman's March to the Sea to take Savannah and Grant's Wilderness Campaign to encircle Richmond and besiege Lee's army at Petersburg.

In April 1863, the C.S. Congress authorized a uniformed Volunteer Navy, many of whom were British. The Confederacy had altogether eighteen commerce-destroying cruisers, which seriously disrupted federal commerce at sea and increased shipping insurance rates 900%. Commodore Tattnall again unsuccessfully attempted to break the Union blockade on the Savannah River in Georgia with an ironclad in 1863. Beginning in April 1864 the ironclad CSS Albemarle engaged Union gunboats for six months on the Roanoke River in North Carolina. The Federals closed Mobile Bay by sea-based amphibious assault in August, ending Gulf coast trade east of the Mississippi River. In December, the Battle of Nashville ended Confederate operations in the western theater.

Large numbers of families relocated to safer places, usually remote rural areas, bringing along household slaves if they had any. Mary Massey argues these elite exiles introduced an element of defeatism into the southern outlook.

=== Collapse: 1865 ===
The first three months of 1865 saw the federal Carolinas campaign, devastating a wide swath of the remaining Confederate heartland. The "breadbasket of the Confederacy" in the Great Valley of Virginia was occupied by Philip Sheridan. The Union Blockade captured Fort Fisher in North Carolina, and Sherman finally took Charleston, South Carolina, by land attack.

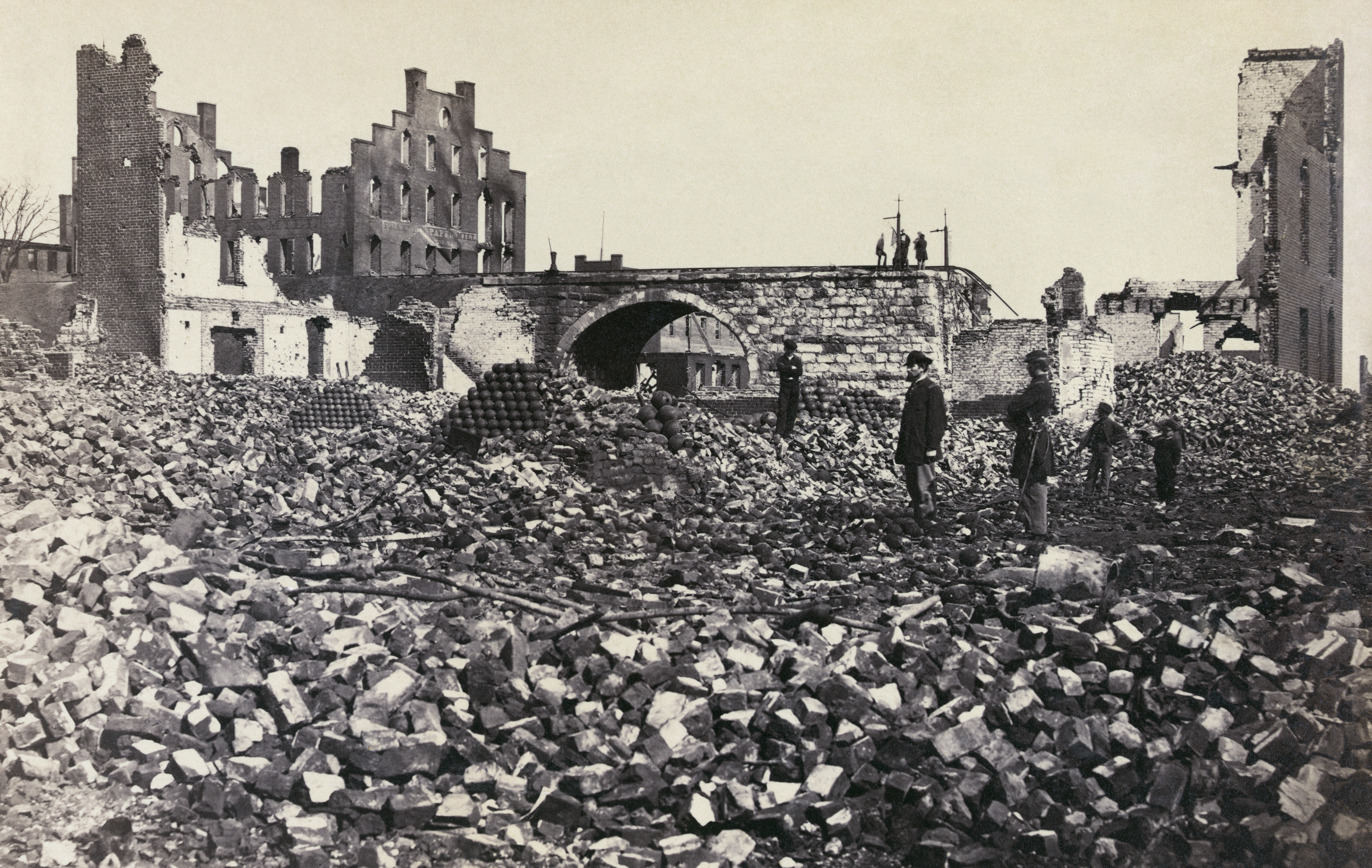
Armory, Richmond, Virginia.

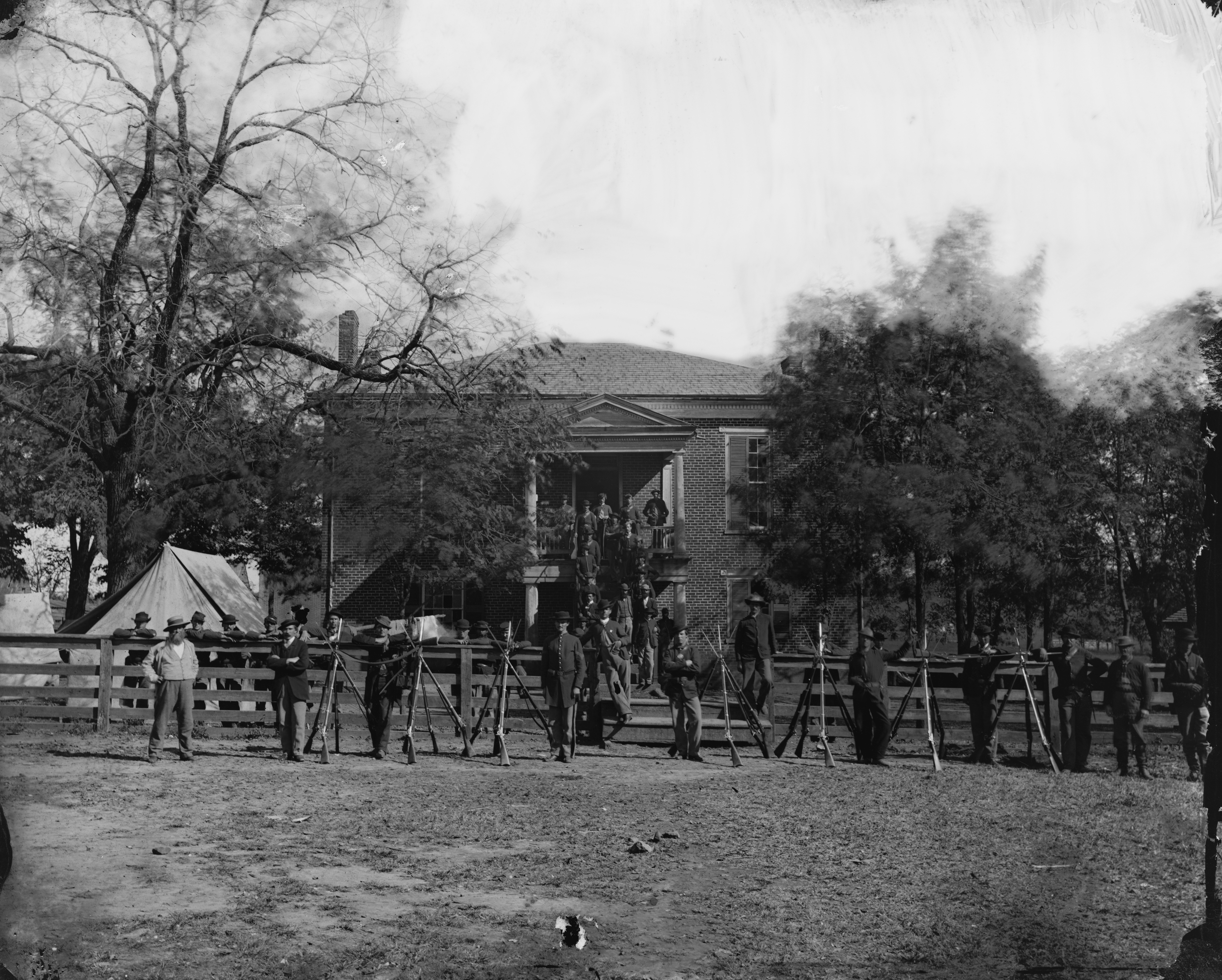
Appomattox Courthouse, site of "The Surrender".

The Confederacy controlled no ports, harbors or navigable rivers. Railroads were captured or had ceased operating. Its major food-producing regions had been war-ravaged or occupied. Its administration survived in only three pockets of territory holding only one-third of its population. Its armies were defeated or disbanding. At the February 1865 Hampton Roads Conference with Lincoln, senior Confederate officials rejected his invitation to restore the Union with compensation for emancipated slaves. The three pockets of unoccupied Confederacy were southern Virginia—North Carolina, central Alabama—Florida, and Texas, the latter two areas less from any notion of resistance than from the disinterest of federal forces to occupy them. The Davis policy was independence or nothing, while Lee's army was wracked by disease and desertion, barely holding the trenches defending Jefferson Davis' capital.

The Confederacy's last remaining blockade-running port, Wilmington, North Carolina, was lost. When the Union broke through Lee's lines at Petersburg, Richmond fell immediately. Lee surrendered at Appomattox Court House, Virginia, on April 9, 1865. "The Surrender" marked the end of the Confederacy. The CSS Stonewall sailed from Europe to break the Union blockade in March; on making Havana, Cuba, it surrendered. Some high officials escaped to Europe, but President Davis was captured May 10; all remaining Confederate land forces surrendered by June 1865. The U.S. Army took control of the Confederate areas, but peace was subsequently marred by a great deal of local violence, feuding and revenge killings. The last Confederate military unit, the commerce raider CSS Shenandoah, surrendered on November 6, 1865, in Liverpool.

Historian Gary Gallagher concluded that the Confederacy capitulated in early 1865 because northern armies crushed "organized southern military resistance". The Confederacy's population, soldier and civilian, had suffered material hardship and social disruption. Jefferson Davis' assessment in 1890 determined, "With the capture of the capital, the dispersion of the civil authorities, the surrender of the armies in the field, and the arrest of the President, the Confederate States of America disappeared ... their history henceforth became a part of the history of the United States."

== Government and politics ==
=== Constitution ===
In February, 1861, Southern leaders met in Montgomery, Alabama to adopt their first constitution, establishing a confederation of "sovereign and independent states", guaranteeing states the right to a republican form of government. Prior to adopting to the first Confederate constitution, the independent states were sovereign republics.

A second Confederate constitution was written in March, 1861, which sought to replace the confederation with a federal government; much of this constitution replicated the United States Constitution verbatim, but contained several explicit protections of the institution of slavery including provisions for the recognition and protection of slavery in any territory of the Confederacy. It maintained the ban on international slave-trading, though it made the ban's application explicit to "Negroes of the African race" in contrast to the U.S. Constitution's reference to "such Persons as any of the States now existing shall think proper to admit". It protected the existing internal trade of slaves among slaveholding states.

In certain areas, the second Confederate Constitution gave greater powers to the states (or curtailed the powers of the central government more) than the U.S. Constitution of the time did, but in other areas, the states lost rights they had under the U.S. Constitution. Although the Confederate Constitution, like the U.S. Constitution, contained a commerce clause, the Confederate version prohibited the central government from using revenues collected in one state for funding internal improvements in another state. The Confederate Constitution's equivalent to the U.S. Constitution's general welfare clause prohibited protective tariffs (but allowed tariffs for providing domestic revenue). State legislatures had the power to impeach officials of the Confederate government in some cases. On the other hand, the Confederate Constitution contained a Necessary and Proper Clause and a Supremacy Clause that essentially duplicated the respective clauses of the U.S. Constitution. The Confederate Constitution also incorporated each of the 12 amendments to the U.S. Constitution that had been ratified up to that point.

The second Confederate Constitution was adopted on February 22, 1862, one year into the American Civil War, and did not specifically include a provision allowing states to secede; the Preamble spoke of each state "acting in its sovereign and independent character" but also of the formation of a "permanent federal government". During the debates on drafting the Confederate Constitution, one proposal would have allowed states to secede from the Confederacy. The proposal was tabled with only the South Carolina delegates voting in favor of considering the motion. The Confederate Constitution also explicitly denied States the power to bar slaveholders from other parts of the Confederacy from bringing their slaves into any state of the Confederacy or to interfere with the property rights of slave owners traveling between different parts of the Confederacy. In contrast with the secular language of the United States Constitution, the Confederate Constitution overtly asked God's blessing ("... invoking the favor and guidance of Almighty God ...").

Some historians have referred to the Confederacy as a form of Herrenvolk democracy.

==== Executive ====
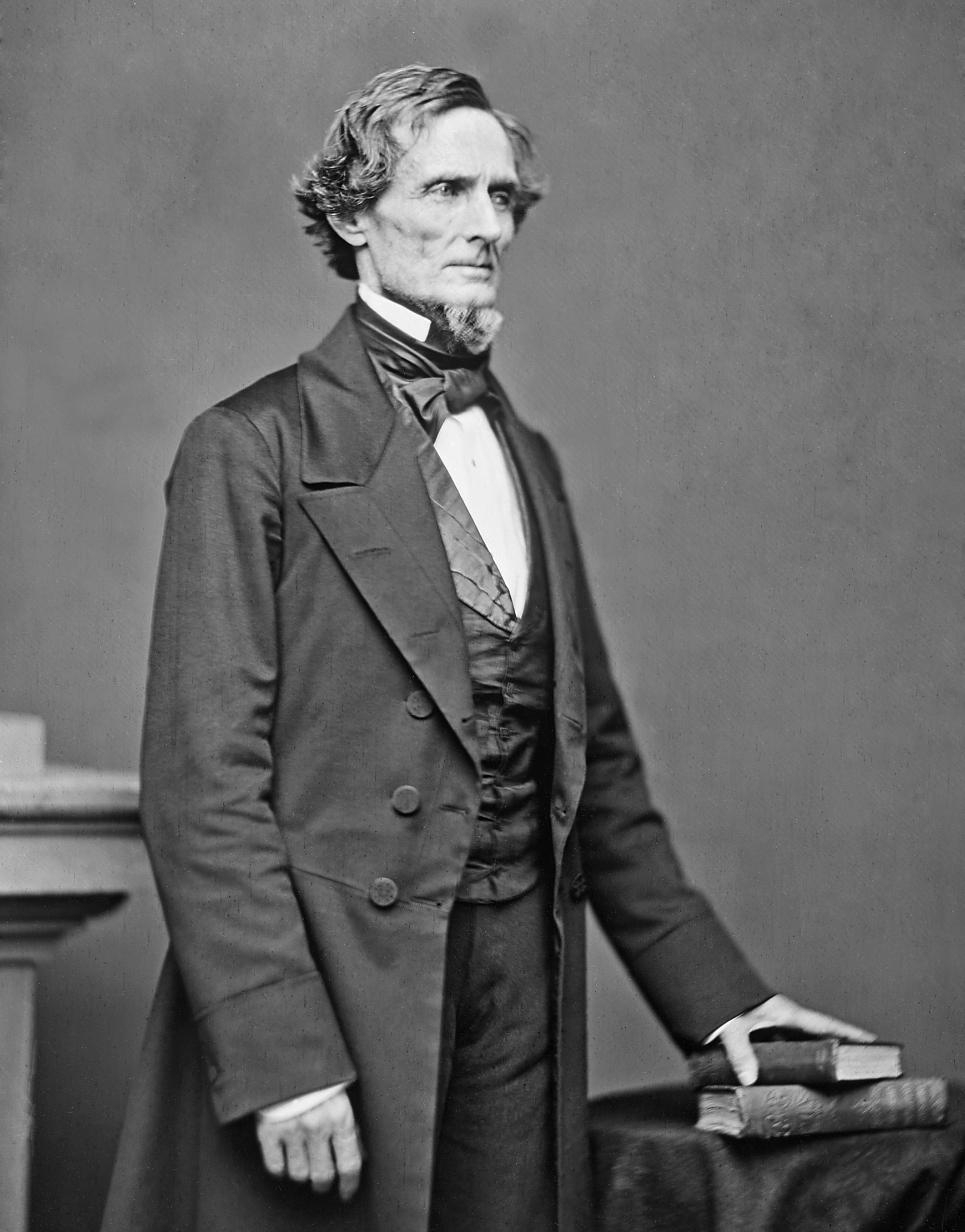
Jefferson Davis, President of the Confederacy from 1861 to 1865

The Montgomery Convention to establish the Confederacy and its executive met on February 4, 1861. Each state as a sovereignty had one vote, with the same delegation size as it held in the U.S. Congress, and generally 41 to 50 members attended. Offices were "provisional", limited to a term not to exceed one year. One name was placed in nomination for president, one for vice president. Both were elected unanimously, 6–0.

Jefferson Davis was elected provisional president. His U.S. Senate resignation speech greatly impressed with its clear rationale for secession and his pleading for a peaceful departure from the Union to independence. Although he had made it known that he wanted to be commander-in-chief of the Confederate armies, when elected, he assumed the office of Provisional President. Three candidates for provisional Vice President were under consideration the night before the February 9 election. All were from Georgia, and the various delegations meeting in different places determined two would not do, so Alexander H. Stephens was elected unanimously provisional Vice President, though with some privately held reservations. Stephens was inaugurated February 11, Davis February 18.

Davis and Stephens were elected president and vice president, unopposed on November 6, 1861. They were inaugurated on February 22, 1862.

Coulter stated, "No president of the U.S. ever had a more difficult task." Washington was inaugurated in peacetime. Lincoln inherited an established government of long standing. The creation of the Confederacy was accomplished by men who saw themselves as fundamentally conservative. Although they referred to their "Revolution", it was in their eyes more a counter-revolution against changes away from their understanding of U.S. founding documents. In Davis' inauguration speech, he explained the Confederacy was not a French-like revolution, but a transfer of rule. The Montgomery Convention had assumed all the laws of the United States until superseded by the Confederate Congress.

The Permanent Constitution provided for a President of the Confederate States of America, elected to serve a six-year term but without the possibility of re-election. Unlike the United States Constitution, the Confederate Constitution gave the president the ability to subject a bill to a line item veto, a power also held by some state governors.

The Confederate Congress could overturn either the general or the line item vetoes with the same two-thirds votes required in the U.S. Congress. In addition, appropriations not specifically requested by the executive branch required passage by a two-thirds vote in both houses of Congress. The only person to serve as president was Jefferson Davis, as the Confederacy was defeated before the completion of his term.

===== Administration and cabinet =====
Office	Name	Term
President	Jefferson Davis	1861–65
Vice President	Alexander H. Stephens	1861–65
Secretary of State	Robert Toombs	1861
Robert M.T. Hunter	1861–62
Judah P. Benjamin	1862–65
Secretary of the Treasury	Christopher Memminger	1861–64
George Trenholm	1864–65
John H. Reagan	1865
Secretary of War	Leroy Pope Walker	1861
Judah P. Benjamin	1861–62
George W. Randolph	1862
James Seddon	1862–65
John C. Breckinridge	1865
Secretary of the Navy	Stephen Mallory	1861–65
Postmaster General	John H. Reagan	1861–65
Attorney General	Judah P. Benjamin	1861
Thomas Bragg	1861–62
Thomas H. Watts	1862–63
George Davis	1864–65

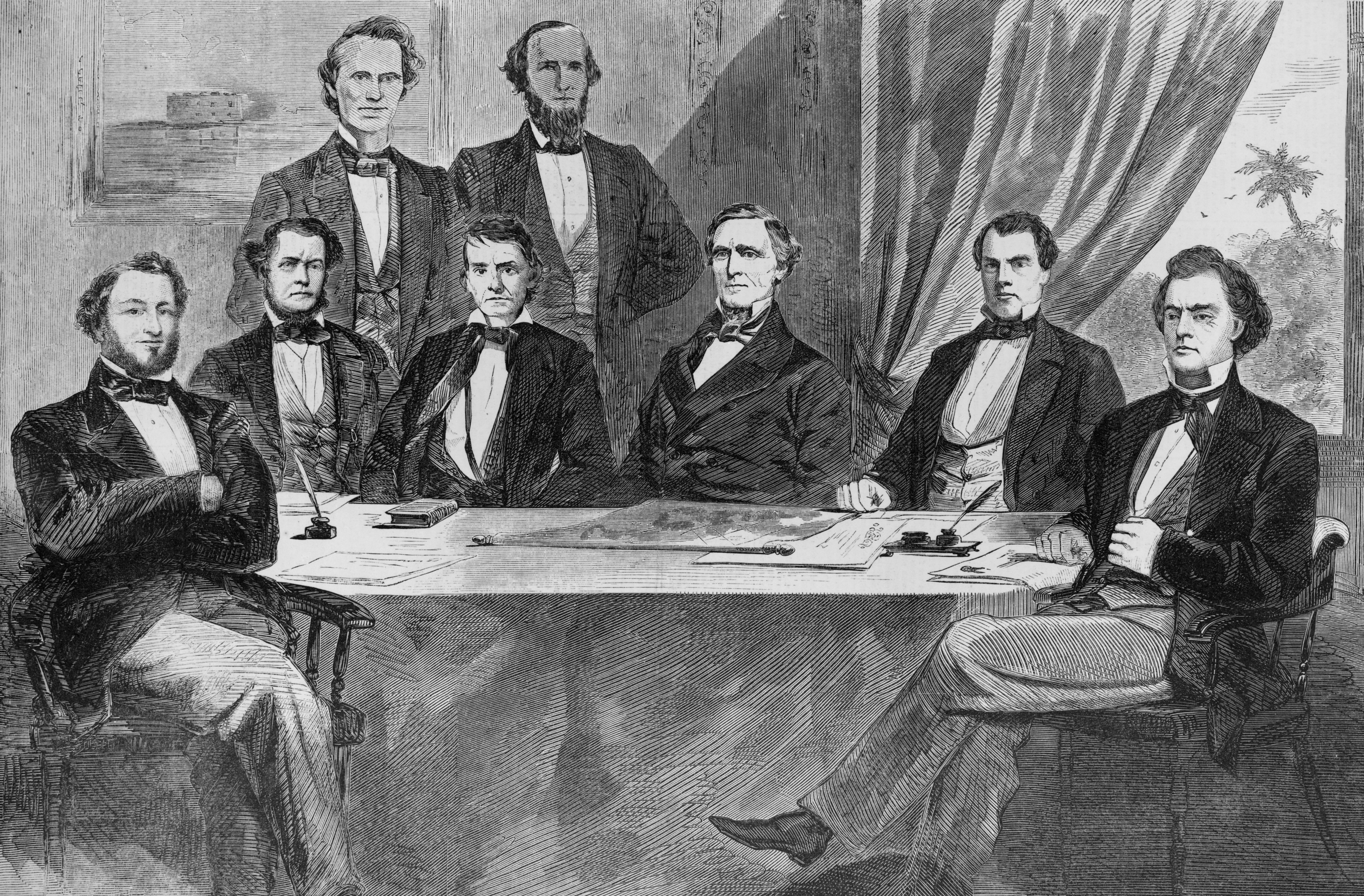
Davis's cabinet in 1861, Montgomery, Alabama Front row, left to right: Judah P. Benjamin, Stephen Mallory, Alexander H. Stephens, Jefferson Davis, John Henninger Reagan, and Robert Toombs Back row, standing left to right: Christopher Memminger and LeRoy Pope Walker Illustration printed in Harper's Weekly

==== Legislative ====
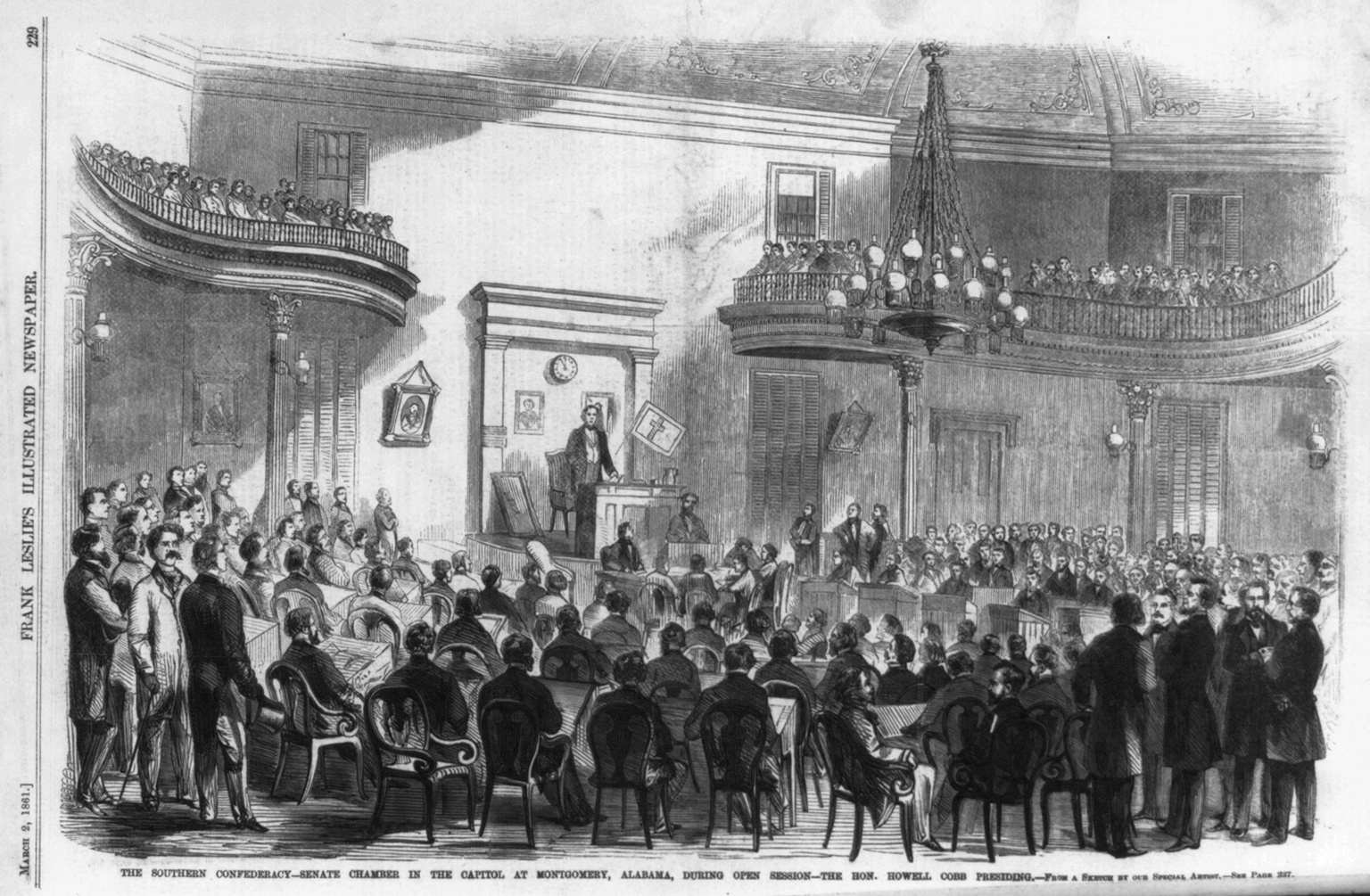
Provisional Congress, Montgomery, Alabama

The only two "formal, national, functioning, civilian administrative bodies" in the Civil War South were the Jefferson Davis administration and the Confederate Congresses. The Confederacy was begun by the Provisional Congress in Convention at Montgomery, Alabama on February 28, 1861. The Provisional Confederate Congress was a unicameral assembly; each state received one vote.

The Permanent Confederate Congress was elected and began its first session February 18, 1862. The Permanent Congress for the Confederacy followed the United States forms with a bicameral legislature. The Senate had two per state, twenty-six Senators. The House numbered 106 representatives apportioned by free and slave populations within each state. Two Congresses sat in six sessions until March 18, 1865.

The political influences of the civilian, soldier vote and appointed representatives reflected divisions of political geography of a diverse South. These in turn changed over time relative to Union occupation and disruption, the war impact on the local economy, and the course of the war. Without political parties, key candidate identification related to adopting secession before or after Lincoln's call for volunteers to retake federal property. Previous party affiliation played a part in voter selection, predominantly secessionist Democrat or unionist Whig.

The absence of political parties made individual roll call voting all the more important, as the Confederate "freedom of roll-call voting [was] unprecedented in American legislative history." Key issues throughout the life of the Confederacy related to (1) suspension of habeas corpus, (2) military concerns such as control of state militia, conscription and exemption, (3) economic and fiscal policy including impressment of slaves, goods and scorched earth, and (4) support of the Jefferson Davis administration in its foreign affairs and negotiating peace.

Provisional Congress

For the first year, the unicameral Provisional Confederate Congress functioned as the Confederacy's legislative branch.

President of the Provisional Congress

- Howell Cobb, Sr. of Georgia, February 4, 1861 – February 17, 1862

Presidents pro tempore of the Provisional Congress

- Robert Woodward Barnwell of South Carolina, February 4, 1861
- Thomas Stanhope Bocock of Virginia, December 10–21, 1861 and January 7–8, 1862
- Josiah Abigail Patterson Campbell of Mississippi, December 23–24, 1861 and January 6, 1862

Sessions of the Confederate Congress

- Provisional Congress
- 1st Congress
- 2nd Congress

Tribal Representatives to Confederate Congress

- Elias Cornelius Boudinot 1862–65, Cherokee
- Samuel Benton Callahan Unknown years, Creek, Seminole
- Burton Allen Holder 1864–65, Chickasaw
- Robert McDonald Jones 1863–65, Choctaw

==== Judicial ====
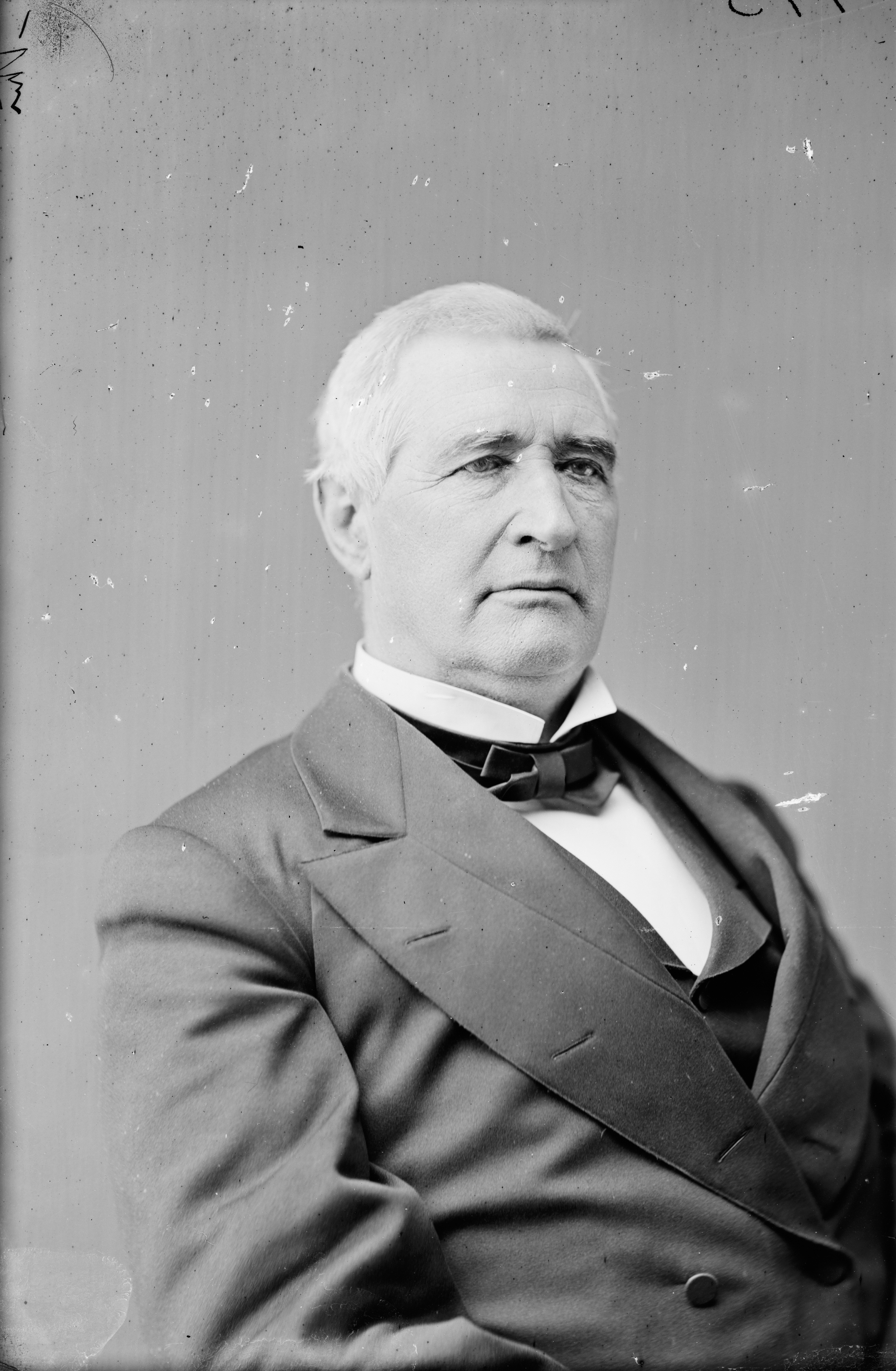
Jesse J. Finley
Florida District

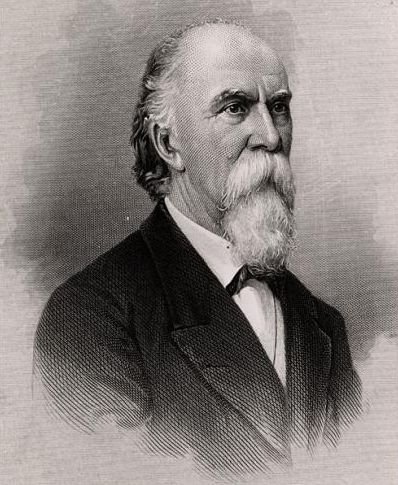
Henry R. Jackson
Georgia District

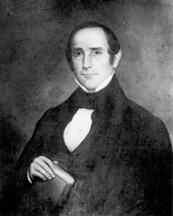
Asa Biggs
North Carolina District

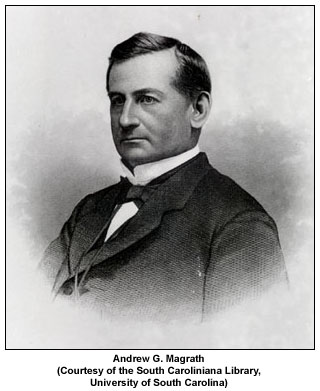
Andrew Magrath
South Carolina District

The Confederate Constitution outlined a judicial branch of the government, but the ongoing war and resistance from states-rights advocates, particularly on the question of whether it would have appellate jurisdiction over the state courts, prevented the creation or seating of the "Supreme Court of the Confederate States". Thus, the state courts generally continued to operate as they had done, simply recognizing the Confederate States as the national government.

Confederate district courts were authorized by Article III, Section 1, of the Confederate Constitution, and President Davis appointed judges within the individual states of the Confederate States of America. In many cases, the same U.S. Federal District judges were appointed as Confederate States District judges. Confederate District Courts began reopening in early 1861, handling many of the same type cases as they had before. Prize cases, in which Union ships were captured by the Confederate Navy or raiders and sold through court proceedings, were heard until the blockade of southern ports made this impossible. After a Sequestration Act was passed by the Confederate Congress, the Confederate district courts heard many cases in which enemy aliens (typically Northern absentee landlords owning property in the South) had their property sequestered (seized) by Confederate Receivers.

Supreme Court – not established.

District Courts – judges

- Alabama William Giles Jones 1861–1865
- Arkansas Daniel Ringo 1861–1865
- Florida Jesse J. Finley 1861–1862
- Georgia Henry R. Jackson 1861, Edward J. Harden 1861–1865
- Louisiana Edwin Warren Moise 1861–1865
- Mississippi Alexander Mosby Clayton 1861–1865
- North Carolina Asa Biggs 1861–1865
- South Carolina Andrew G. Magrath 1861–1864, Benjamin F. Perry 1865
- Tennessee West H. Humphreys 1861–1865
- Texas-East William Pinckney Hill 1861–1865
- Texas-West Thomas J. Devine 1861–1865
- Virginia-East James D. Halyburton 1861–1865
- Virginia-West John W. Brockenbrough 1861–1865

=== Post office ===
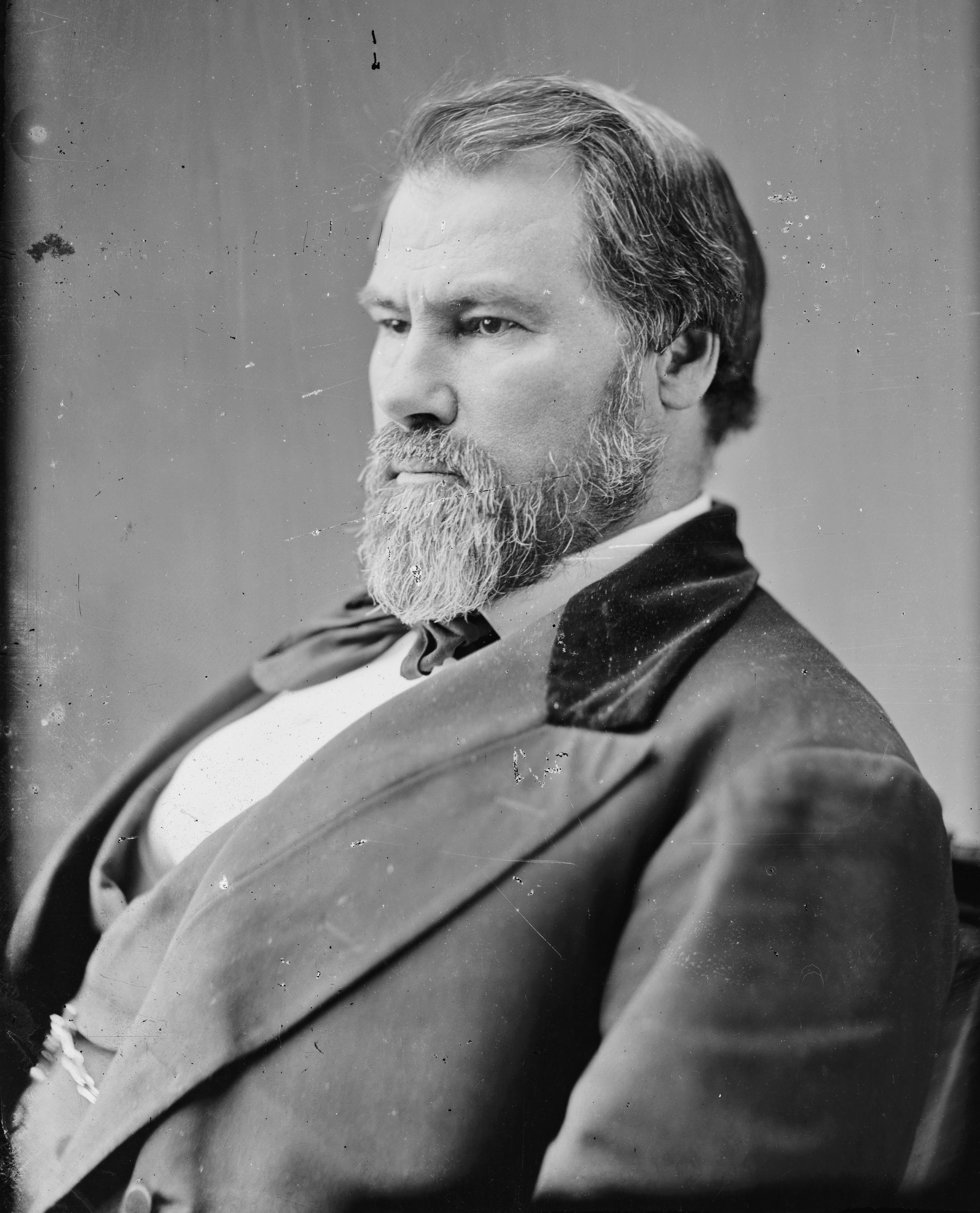
John H. Reagan
Postmaster General

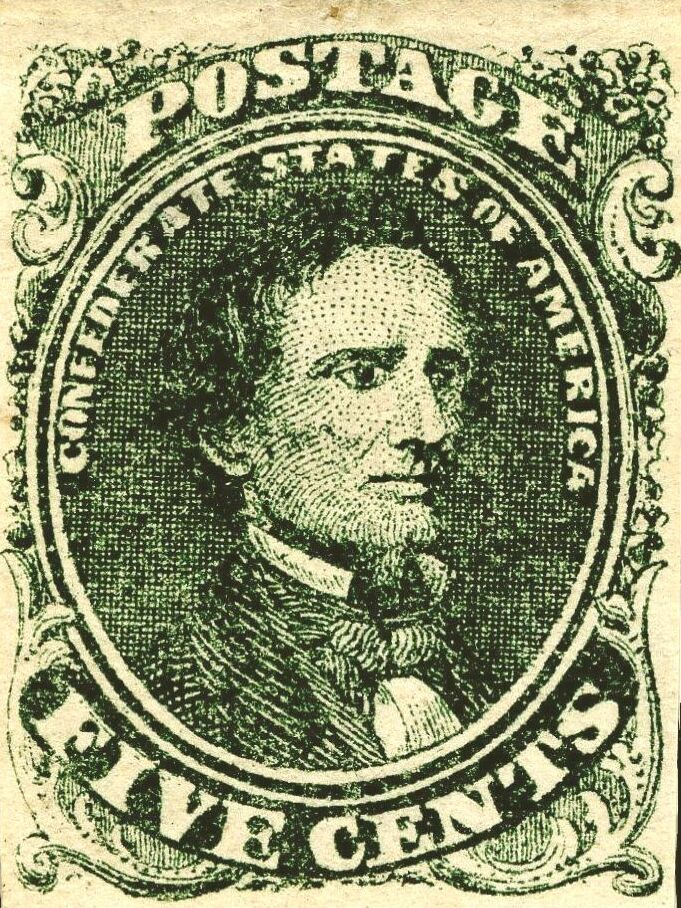
Jefferson Davis, 5 cent
The first stamp, 1861

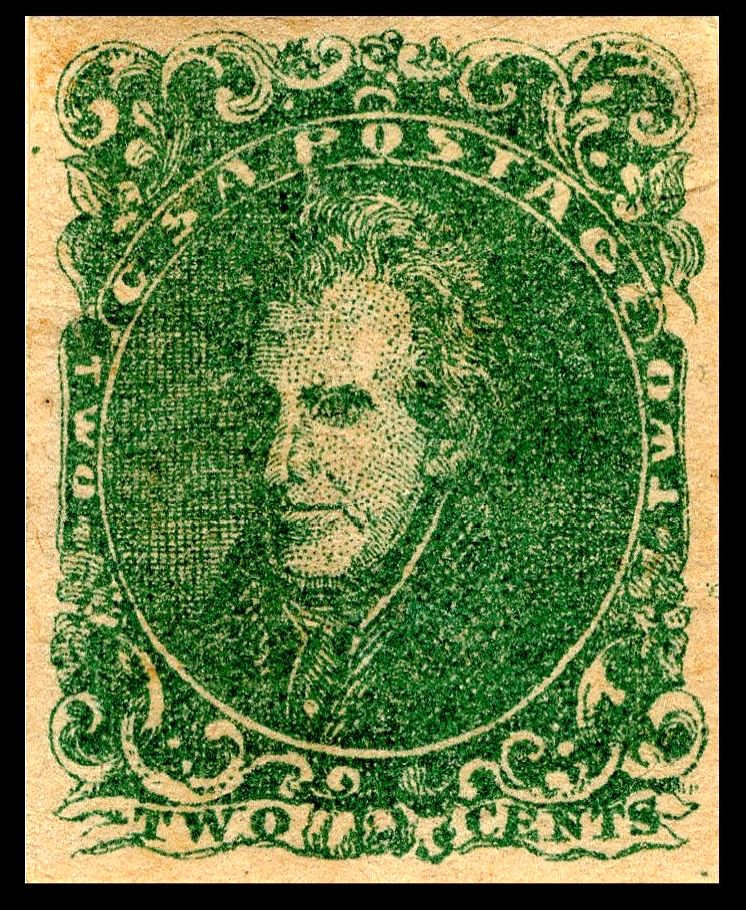
Andrew Jackson
2 cent, 1862

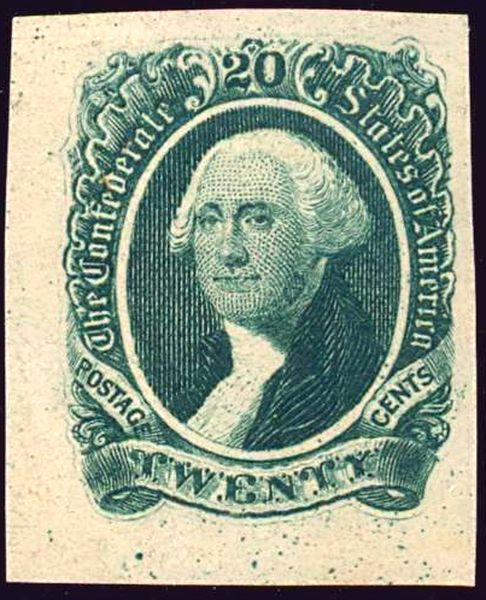
George Washington
20 cent, 1863

The Confederacy established the Confederate Post Office for mail delivery. One of the first undertakings in establishing the office was the appointment of John H. Reagan as Postmaster General, by Jefferson Davis in 1861. Writing in 1906, historian Walter Flavius McCaleb praised Reagan's "energy and intelligence ... in a degree scarcely matched by any of his associates".

When the war began, the United States Post Office briefly delivered mail from the secessionist states. Mail that was postmarked after the date of a state's admission into the Confederacy through May 31, 1861, and bearing U.S. postage, was still delivered. After this time, private express companies still managed to carry some of the mail across enemy lines. Later, mail that crossed lines had to be sent by 'Flag of Truce' and was allowed to pass at only two specific points. Mail sent from the Confederacy to the U.S. was received, opened and inspected at Fortress Monroe on the Virginia coast before being passed on into the U.S. mail stream. Mail sent from the North to the South passed at City Point, also in Virginia, where it was also inspected before being sent on.

With the chaos of the war, a working postal system was more important than ever for the Confederacy. The Civil War had divided family members and friends and consequently letter writing increased dramatically across the entire divided nation, especially to and from the men who were away serving in an army. Mail delivery was also important for the Confederacy for a myriad of business and military reasons. Because of the Union blockade, basic supplies were always in demand and so getting mailed correspondence out of the country to suppliers was imperative to the successful operation of the Confederacy. Volumes of material have been written about the Blockade runners who evaded Union ships on blockade patrol, usually at night, and who moved cargo and mail in and out of the Confederate States throughout the course of the war.

Both prisoner of war mail and blockade mail often played a role in military and other wartime activities. The postal history of the Confederacy along with surviving Confederate mail has helped historians document the various people, places, and events involved in the Civil War.

=== Civil liberties ===
The Confederacy actively used the army to arrest people suspected of loyalty to the United States. Historian Mark E. Neely Jr. found 4,108 names of men arrested and estimated a much larger total. The Confederacy arrested pro-Union civilians in the South at about the same rate as the Union arrested pro-Confederate civilians in the North. Neely argues:

The Confederate citizen was not any freer than the Union citizen – and perhaps no less likely to be arrested by military authorities. In fact, the Confederate citizen may have been in some ways less free than his Northern counterpart. For example, freedom to travel within the Confederate states was severely limited by a domestic passport system.

== Economy ==
=== Slaves ===
Across the South, widespread rumors predicted the slaves were planning insurrection, causing panic. Patrols were stepped up. The slaves did become increasingly independent and resistant to punishment, but historians agree there were no insurrections. Many slaves became spies for the North, and large numbers ran away to federal lines.

According to the 1860 United States census, about 31% of free households in the 11 states that would join the Confederacy owned slaves. The 11 states that seceded had the highest percentage of slaves as a proportion of their population, representing 39% of their total population. The proportions ranged from a majority in South Carolina (57.2%) and Mississippi (55.2%) to about a quarter in Tennessee (24.8%).

Lincoln's Emancipation Proclamation on January 1, 1863, legally freed three million slaves in designated areas of the Confederacy. The long-term effect was that the Confederacy could not preserve the institution of slavery and lost the use of the core element of its plantation labor force. Over 200,000 freed slaves were hired by the federal army as teamsters, cooks, launderers and laborers, and eventually as soldiers. Plantation owners, realizing that emancipation would destroy their economic system, sometimes moved their slaves as far as possible out of reach of the Union army.

Though the concept was promoted within certain circles of the Union hierarchy during and immediately following the war, no program of reparations for freed slaves was ever attempted. Unlike other Western countries, such as Britain and France, the U.S. government never paid compensation to Southern slave owners for their "lost property". The only place compensated emancipation was carried out was the District of Columbia.

=== Political economy ===
The plantations of the South, with white ownership and an enslaved labor force, produced substantial wealth from cash crops. It supplied two-thirds of the world's cotton, which was in high demand for textiles, along with tobacco, sugar, and naval stores (such as turpentine). These raw materials were exported to factories in Europe and the Northeast. Planters reinvested their profits in more slaves and fresh land, as cotton and tobacco depleted the soil. There was little manufacturing or mining; shipping was controlled by non-southerners.

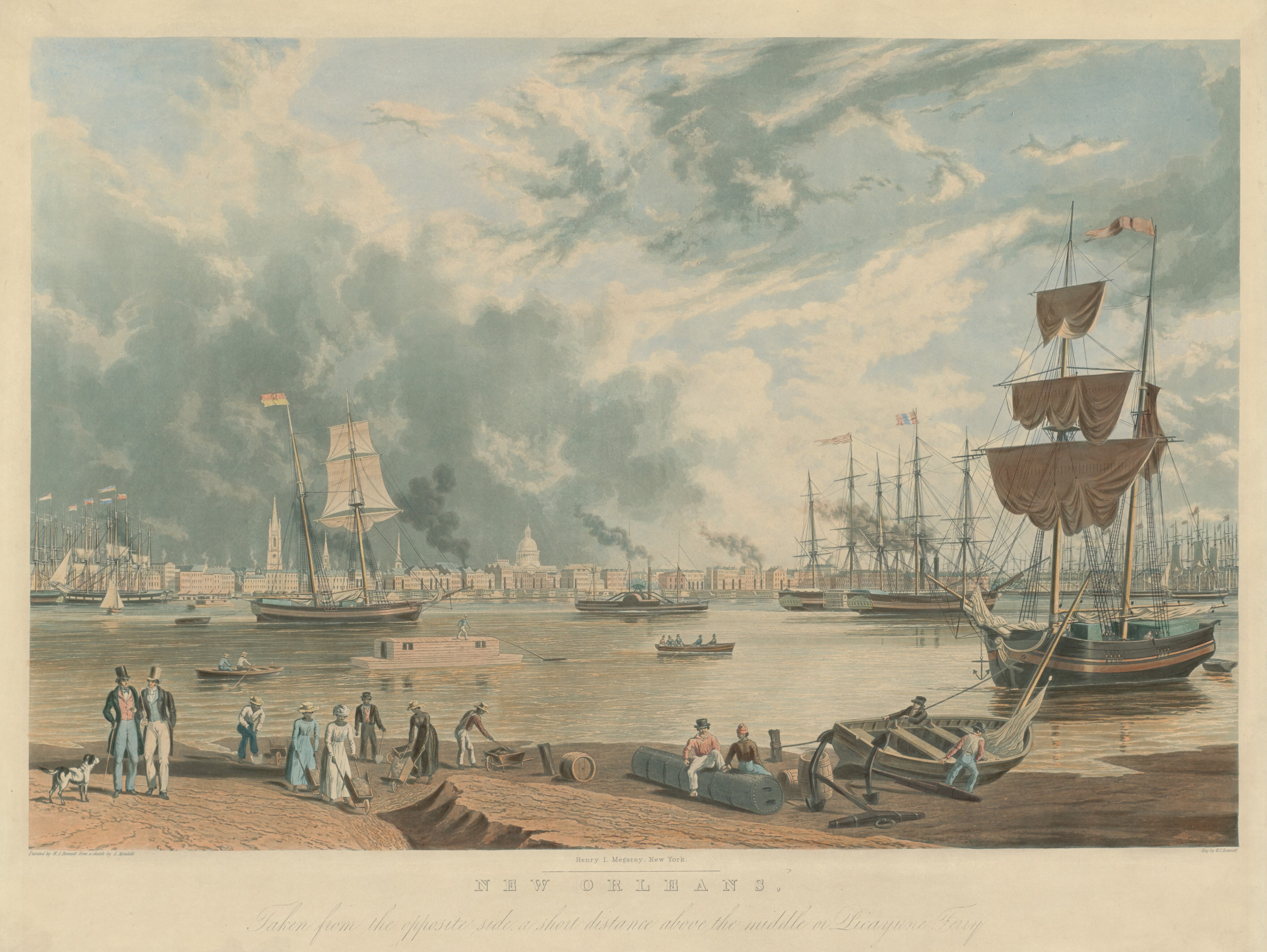
New Orleans, the South's largest port city and the only pre-war population over 100,000. The port and region's agriculture were lost to the Union in April 1862.

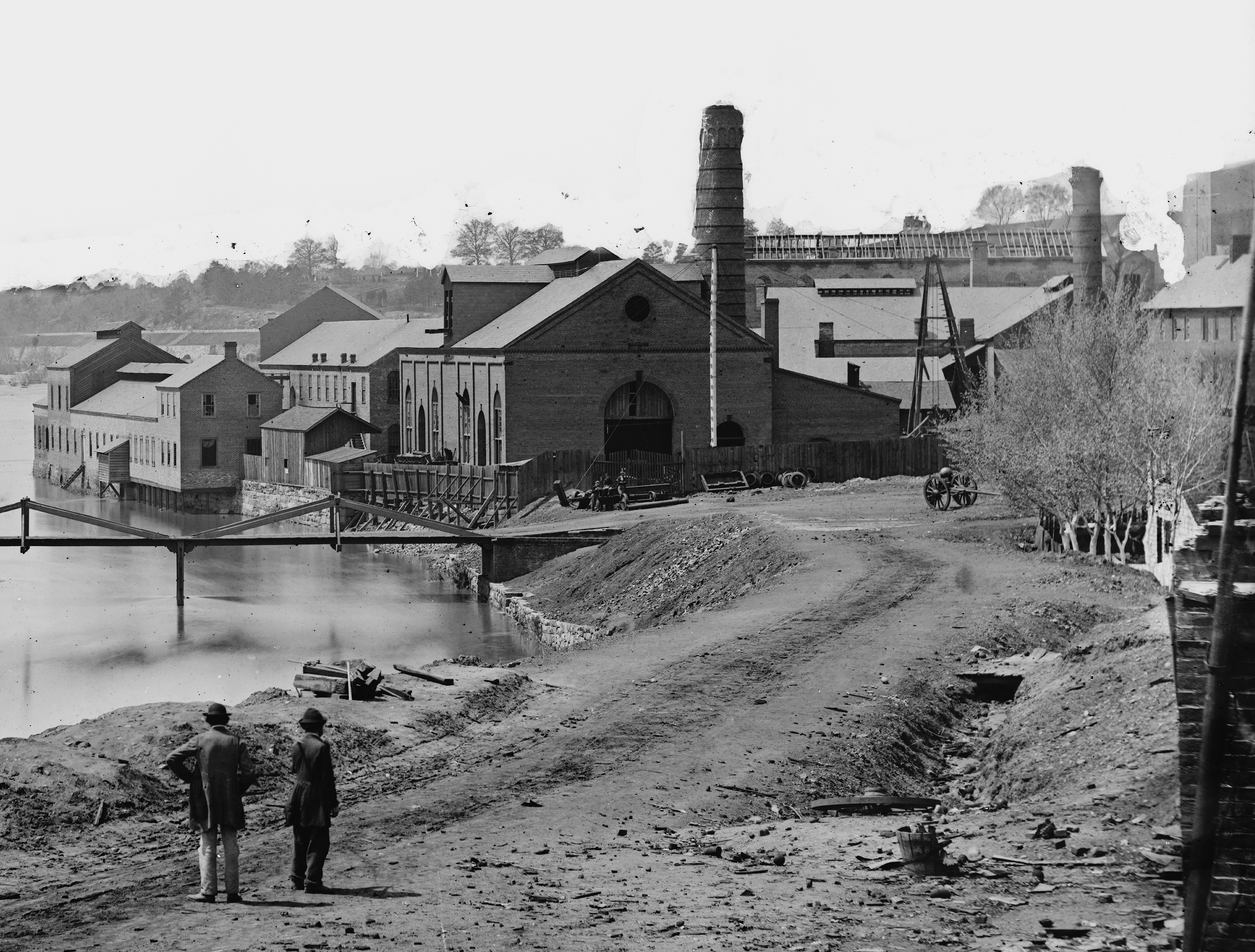
Tredegar Iron Works, Richmond VA. South's largest factory. Ended locomotive production in 1860 to make arms and munitions.

The plantations that enslaved over three million black people were the principal source of wealth. Most were concentrated in "black belt" plantation areas (because few white families in the poor regions owned slaves). For decades, there had been widespread fear of slave revolts. During the war, extra men were assigned to "home guard" patrol duty and governors sought to keep militia units at home for protection. Historian William Barney reports, "no major slave revolts erupted during the Civil War." Nevertheless, slaves took the opportunity to enlarge their sphere of independence, and when union forces were nearby, many ran off to join them.

Slave labor was applied in industry in a limited way in the Upper South and in a few port cities. One reason for the regional lag in industrial development was top-heavy income distribution. Mass production requires mass markets, and slaves living in small cabins, using self-made tools and outfitted with one suit of work clothes each year of inferior fabric, did not generate consumer demand to sustain local manufactures of any description in the same way as did a mechanized family farm of free labor in the North. The Southern economy was "pre-capitalist" in that slaves were put to work in the largest revenue-producing enterprises, not free labor markets. That labor system as practiced in the American South encompassed paternalism, whether abusive or indulgent, and that meant labor management considerations apart from productivity.

Approximately 85% of both the North and South white populations lived on family farms, both regions were predominantly agricultural, and mid-century industry in both was mostly domestic. But the Southern economy was pre-capitalist in its overwhelming reliance on the agriculture of cash crops to produce wealth, while the great majority of farmers fed themselves and supplied a small local market. Southern cities and industries grew faster than ever before, but the thrust of the rest of the country's exponential growth elsewhere was toward urban industrial development along transportation systems of canals and railroads. The South was following the dominant currents of the American economic mainstream, but at a "great distance" as it lagged in the all-weather modes of transportation that brought cheaper, speedier freight shipment and forged new, expanding interregional markets.

A third count of the pre-capitalist Southern economy relates to the cultural setting. White southerners did not adopt a work ethic, nor the habits of thrift that marked the rest of the country. It had access to the tools of capitalism, but it did not adopt its culture. The Southern Cause as a national economy in the Confederacy was grounded in "slavery and race, planters and patricians, plain folk and folk culture, cotton and plantations".

==== National production ====
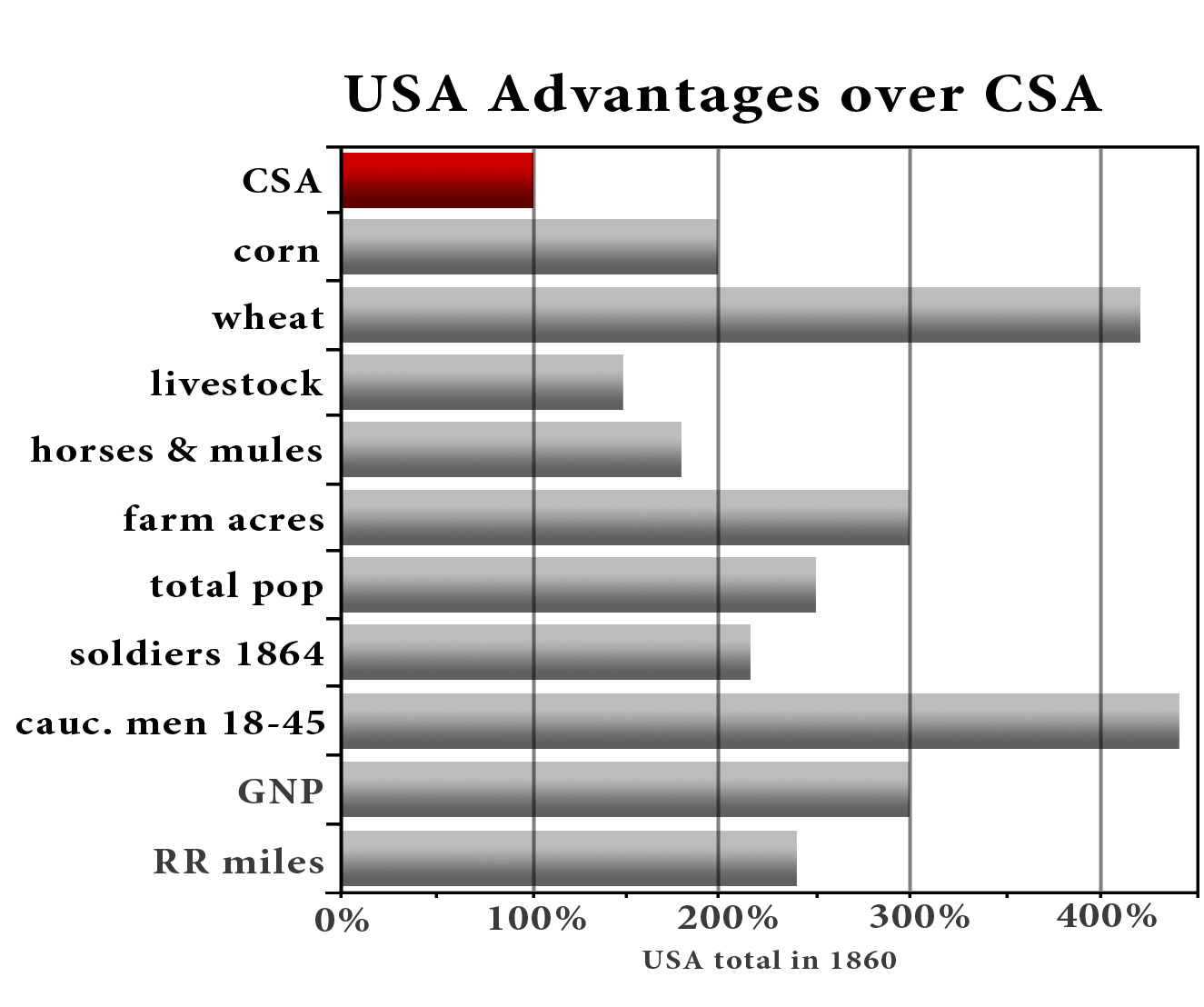
The Union had large advantages in men and resources at the start of the war; the ratio grew steadily in favor of the Union

The Confederacy started its existence as an agrarian economy with exports, to a world market, of cotton, and, to a lesser extent, tobacco and sugarcane. Local food production included grain, hogs, cattle, and vegetables. The cash came from exports but the Southern people spontaneously stopped exports in early 1861 to hasten the impact of "King Cotton", a failed strategy to coerce international support for the Confederacy through its cotton exports. When the blockade was announced, commercial shipping practically ended (because the ships could not get insurance), and only a trickle of supplies came via blockade runners. The cutoff of exports was an economic disaster for the South, rendering useless its most valuable properties: its plantations and their enslaved workers. Many planters kept growing cotton, which piled up everywhere, but most turned to food production. All across the region, the lack of repair and maintenance wasted away the physical assets.

The 11 states had produced $155 million (~$4.52 billion in 2025) in manufactured goods in 1860, chiefly from local gristmills, and lumber, processed tobacco, cotton goods and naval stores such as turpentine. The main industrial areas were border cities such as Baltimore, Wheeling, Louisville and St. Louis, that were never under Confederate control. The government did set up munitions factories in the Deep South. Combined with captured munitions and those coming via blockade runners, the armies were kept minimally supplied with weapons. The soldiers suffered from reduced rations, lack of medicines, and the growing shortages of uniforms, shoes and boots. Shortages were much worse for civilians, and the prices of necessities steadily rose.

The Confederacy adopted a tariff or tax on imports of 15% and imposed it on all imports from other countries, including the United States. The tariff mattered little; the Union blockade minimized commercial traffic through the Confederacy's ports, and very few people paid taxes on goods smuggled from the North. The Confederate government in its entire history collected only $3.5 million in tariff revenue. The lack of adequate financial resources led the Confederacy to finance the war through printing money, which led to high inflation. The Confederacy underwent an economic revolution by centralization and standardization, but it was too little too late, as its economy was systematically strangled by blockade and raids.

=== Transportation systems ===
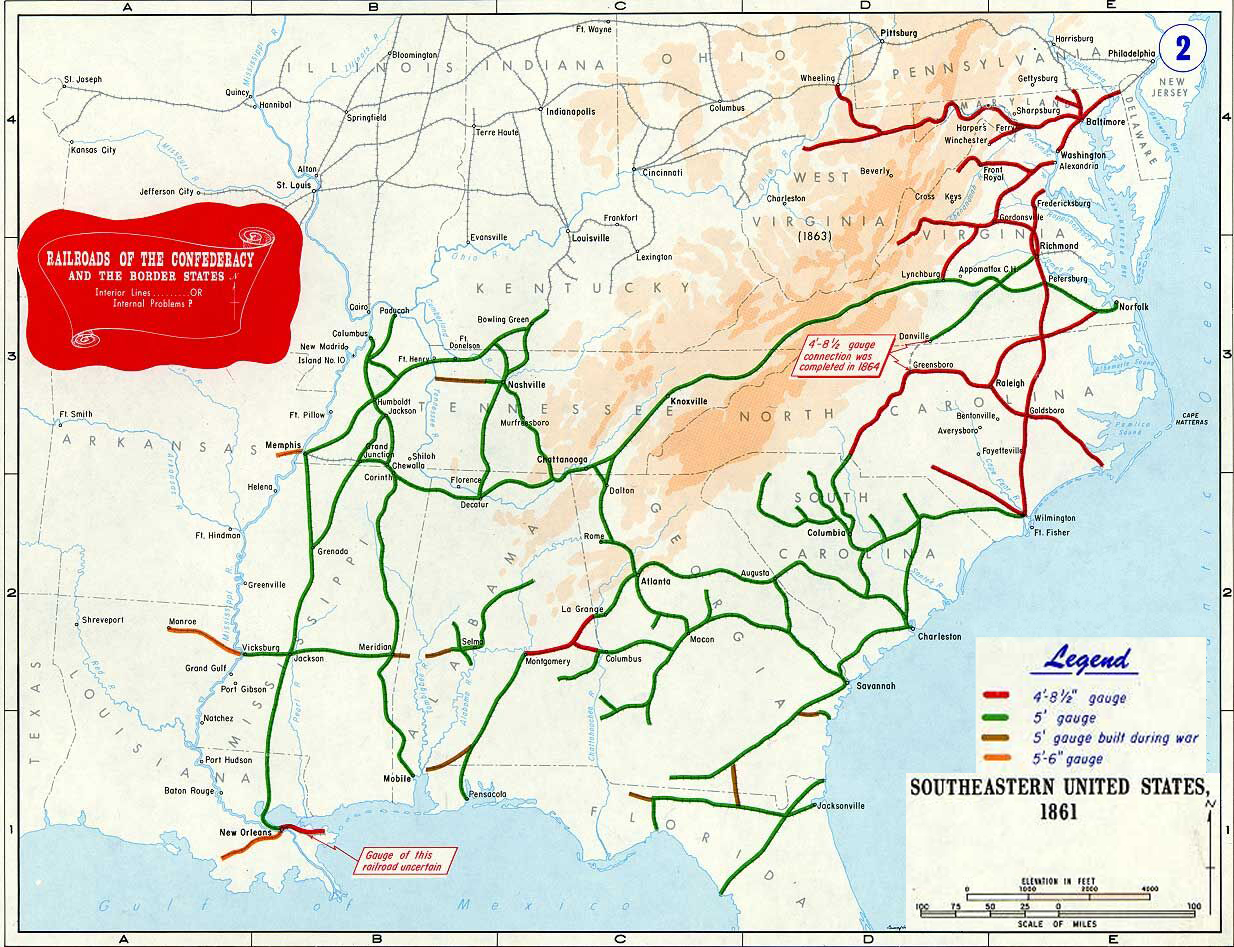
Main railroads of Confederacy, 1861; colors show the different gauges (track width); the top railroad shown in the upper right is the Baltimore and Ohio, which was at all times a Union railroad

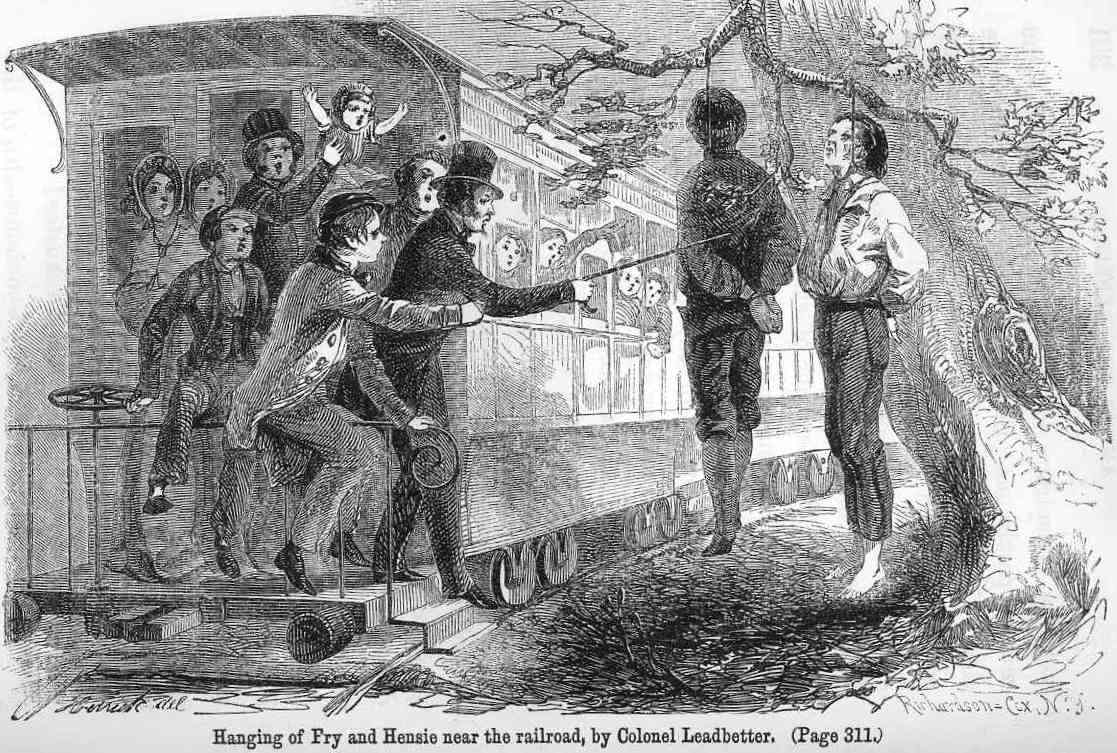
Passers-by abused the bodies of Union supporters near Knoxville, Tennessee. The two were hanged by Confederate authorities near the railroad tracks so passing train passengers could see them.

In peacetime, the South's extensive and connected systems of navigable rivers and coastal access allowed for cheap and easy transportation of agricultural products. The railroad system in the South had developed as a supplement to the navigable rivers to enhance the all-weather shipment of cash crops to market. Railroads tied plantation areas to the nearest river or seaport and so made supply more dependable, lowered costs and increased profits. In the event of invasion, the vast geography of the Confederacy made logistics difficult for the Union. Wherever Union armies invaded, they assigned many of their soldiers to garrison captured areas and to protect rail lines.

At the onset of the Civil War the South had a rail network disjointed and plagued by changes in track gauge as well as lack of interchange. Locomotives and freight cars had fixed axles and could not use tracks of different gauges (widths). Railroads of different gauges leading to the same city required all freight to be off-loaded onto wagons for transport to the connecting railroad station, where it had to await freight cars and a locomotive before proceeding. Centers requiring off-loading included Vicksburg, New Orleans, Montgomery, Wilmington and Richmond. In addition, most rail lines led from coastal or river ports to inland cities, with few lateral railroads. Because of this design limitation, the relatively primitive railroads of the Confederacy were unable to overcome the Union naval blockade of the South's crucial intra-coastal and river routes.

The Confederacy had no plan to expand, protect or encourage its railroads. Southerners' refusal to export the cotton crop in 1861 left railroads bereft of their main source of income. Many lines had to lay off employees; many critical skilled technicians and engineers were permanently lost to military service. In the early years of the war the Confederate government had a hands-off approach to the railroads. Only in mid-1863 did the Confederate government initiate a national policy, and it was confined solely to aiding the war effort. Railroads came under the de facto control of the military. In contrast, the U.S. Congress had authorized military administration of Union-controlled railroad and telegraph systems in January 1862, imposed a standard gauge, and built railroads into the South using that gauge. Confederate armies successfully reoccupying territory could not be resupplied directly by rail as they advanced. The C.S. Congress formally authorized military administration of railroads in February 1865.

In the last year before the end of the war, the Confederate railroad system stood permanently on the verge of collapse. There was no new equipment and raids on both sides systematically destroyed key bridges, as well as locomotives and freight cars. Spare parts were cannibalized; feeder lines were torn up to get replacement rails for trunk lines, and rolling stock wore out through heavy use.

==== Horses and mules ====
The Confederate army experienced a persistent shortage of horses and mules and requisitioned them with dubious promissory notes given to local farmers and breeders. Union forces paid in real money and found ready sellers in the South. Both armies needed horses for cavalry and for artillery. Mules pulled the wagons. The supply was undermined by an unprecedented epidemic of glanders, a fatal disease that baffled veterinarians. After 1863 the invading Union forces had a policy of shooting all the local horses and mules that they did not need, in order to keep them out of Confederate hands. The Confederate armies and farmers experienced a growing shortage of horses and mules, which hurt the Southern economy and the war effort. The South lost half of its 2.5 million horses and mules; many farmers ended the war with none left. Army horses were used up by hard work, malnourishment, disease and battle wounds; they had a life expectancy of about seven months.

=== Financial instruments ===
Both the individual Confederate states and later the Confederate government printed Confederate States of America dollars as paper currency in various denominations, with a total face value of $1.5 billion. Much of it was signed by Treasurer Edward C. Elmore. Inflation became rampant as the paper money depreciated and eventually became worthless. The state governments and some localities printed their own paper money, adding to the runaway inflation.

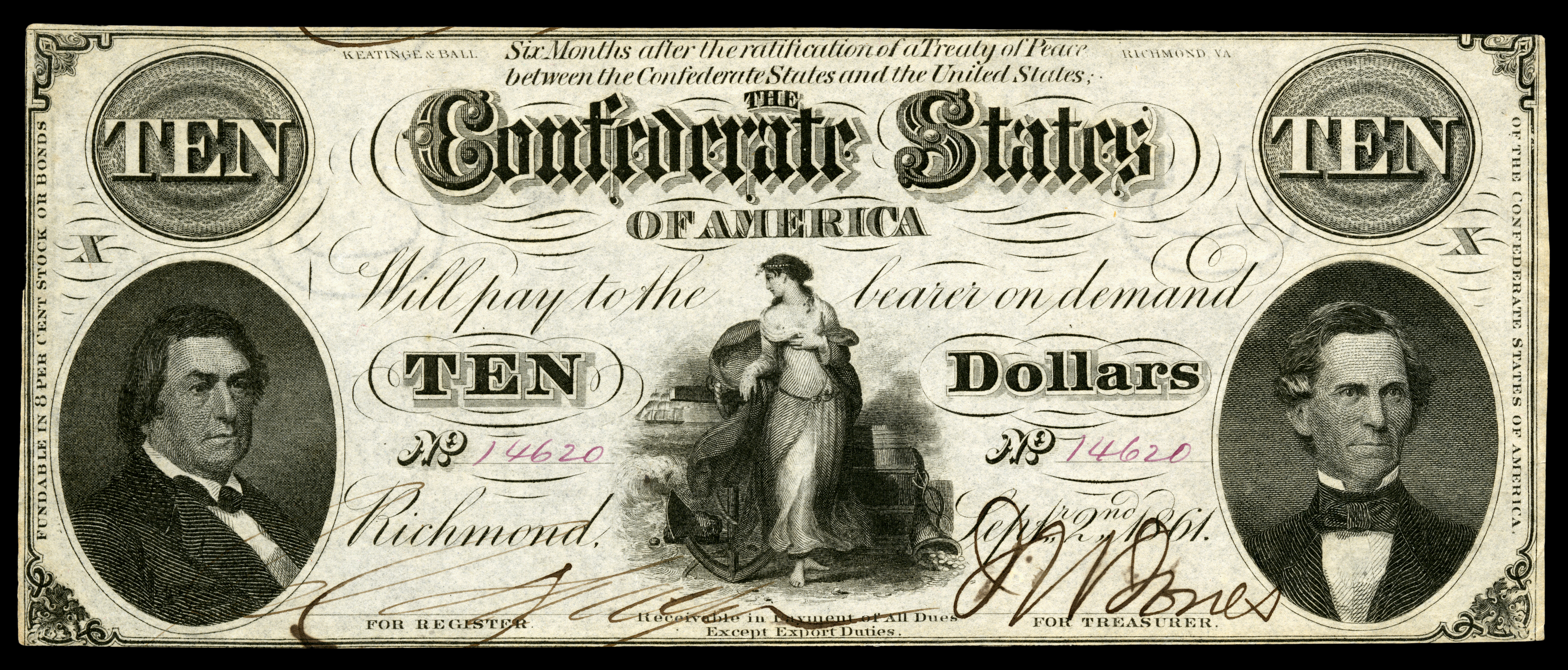
The 1862 $10 CSA note depicts a vignette of Hope flanked by R. M. T. Hunter and C. G. Memminger.

The Confederate government initially wanted to finance its war mostly through tariffs on imports, export taxes, and voluntary donations of gold. After the spontaneous imposition of an embargo on cotton sales to Europe in 1861, these sources of revenue dried up and the Confederacy increasingly turned to issuing debt and printing money to pay for war expenses. The Confederate States politicians were worried about angering the general population with hard taxes. A tax increase might disillusion many Southerners, so the Confederacy resorted to printing more money. As a result, inflation increased and remained a problem for the southern states throughout the rest of the war. By April 1863, for example, the cost of flour in Richmond had risen to $100 (~$2,615 in 2025) a barrel and housewives were rioting.

The Confederate government took over the three national mints in its territory: the Charlotte Mint in North Carolina, the Dahlonega Mint in Georgia, and the New Orleans Mint in Louisiana. During 1861 all of these facilities produced small amounts of gold coinage, and the latter half dollars as well. A lack of silver and gold precluded further coinage. The Confederacy apparently also experimented with issuing one cent coins, although only 12 were produced by a jeweler in Philadelphia, who was afraid to send them to the South. Like the half dollars, copies were later made as souvenirs.

US coinage was hoarded and did not have any general circulation. U.S. coinage was admitted as legal tender up to $10, as were British sovereigns, French Napoleons and Spanish and Mexican doubloons at a fixed rate of exchange. Confederate money was paper and postage stamps.

=== Food shortages and riots ===
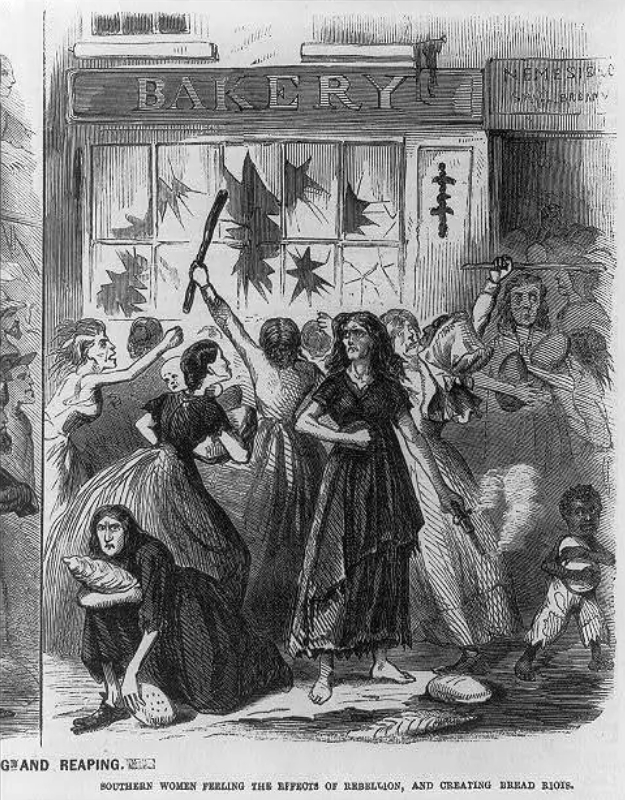
Richmond bread riot, 1863

By mid-1861, the Union naval blockade virtually shut down the export of cotton and the import of manufactured goods. Food that formerly came overland was cut off.

As women were the ones who remained at home, they had to make do with the lack of food and supplies. They cut back on purchases, used old materials, and planted more flax and peas to provide clothing and food. They used ersatz substitutes when possible. The households were severely hurt by inflation in the cost of everyday items like flour, and the shortages of food, fodder for the animals, and medical supplies for the wounded.

State governments requested that planters grow less cotton and more food, but most refused. When cotton prices soared in Europe, expectations were that Europe would soon intervene to break the blockade and make them rich, but Europe remained neutral. The Georgia legislature imposed cotton quotas, making it a crime to grow an excess. But food shortages only worsened, especially in the towns.

The overall decline in food supplies, made worse by the inadequate transportation system, led to serious shortages and high prices in urban areas. When bacon reached a dollar a pound in 1863, the poor women of Richmond, Atlanta and many other cities began to riot; they broke into shops and warehouses to seize food. As wives and widows of soldiers, they were hurt by the inadequate welfare system.

=== Devastation by 1865 ===
By the end of the war deterioration of the Southern infrastructure was widespread. The number of civilian deaths is unknown. Every Confederate state was affected, but most of the war was fought in Virginia and Tennessee, while Texas and Florida saw the least military action. Much of the damage was caused by direct military action, but most was caused by lack of repairs and upkeep, and by deliberately using up resources. Historians have recently estimated how much of the devastation was caused by military action. Paul Paskoff calculates that Union military operations were conducted in 56% of 645 counties in nine Confederate states (excluding Texas and Florida). These counties contained 63% of the 1860 white population and 64% of the slaves. By the time the fighting took place, undoubtedly some people had fled to safer areas, so the exact population exposed to war is unknown.

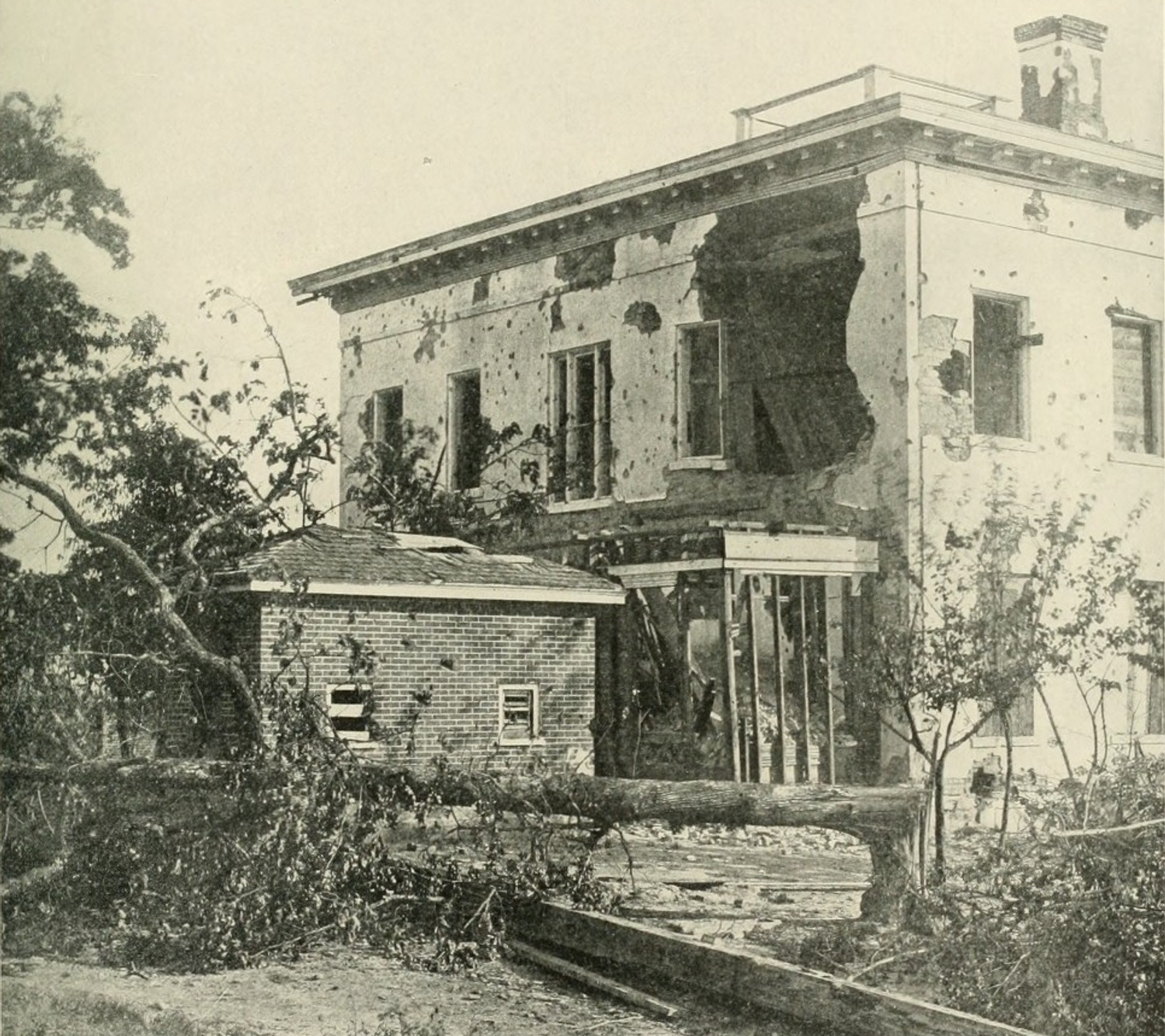
Potters House, Atlanta GA

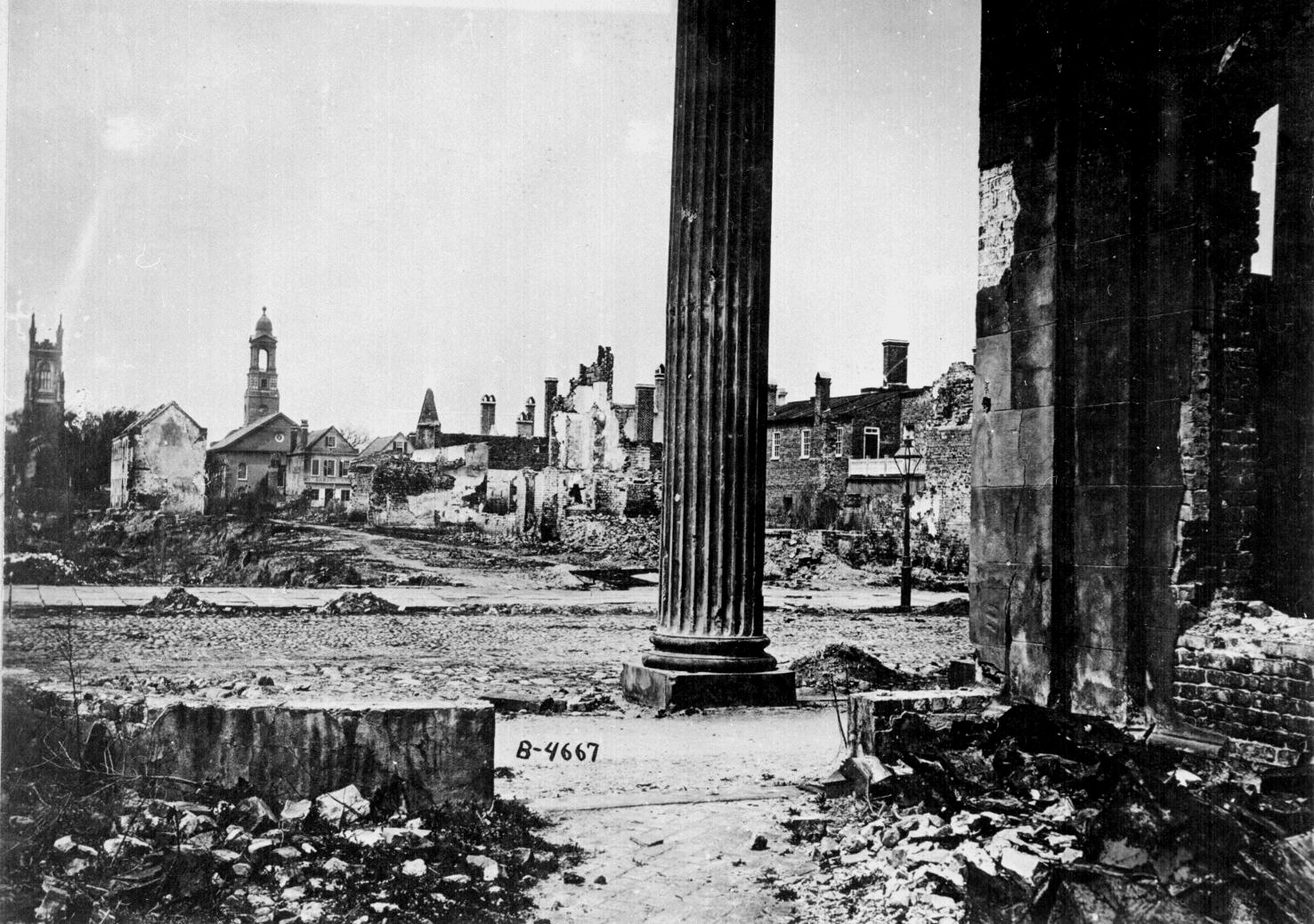
Downtown Charleston SC

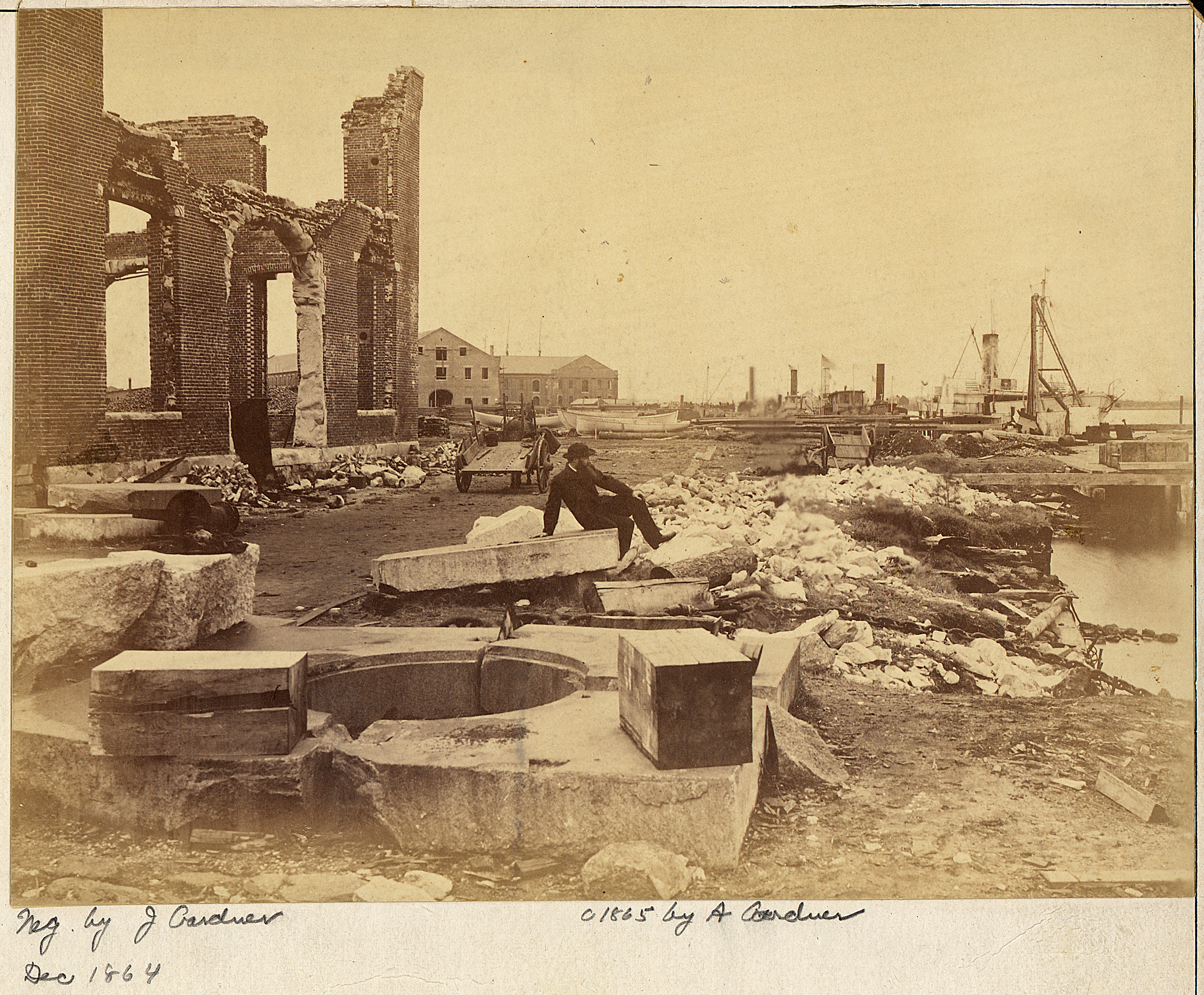
Navy Yard, Norfolk VA

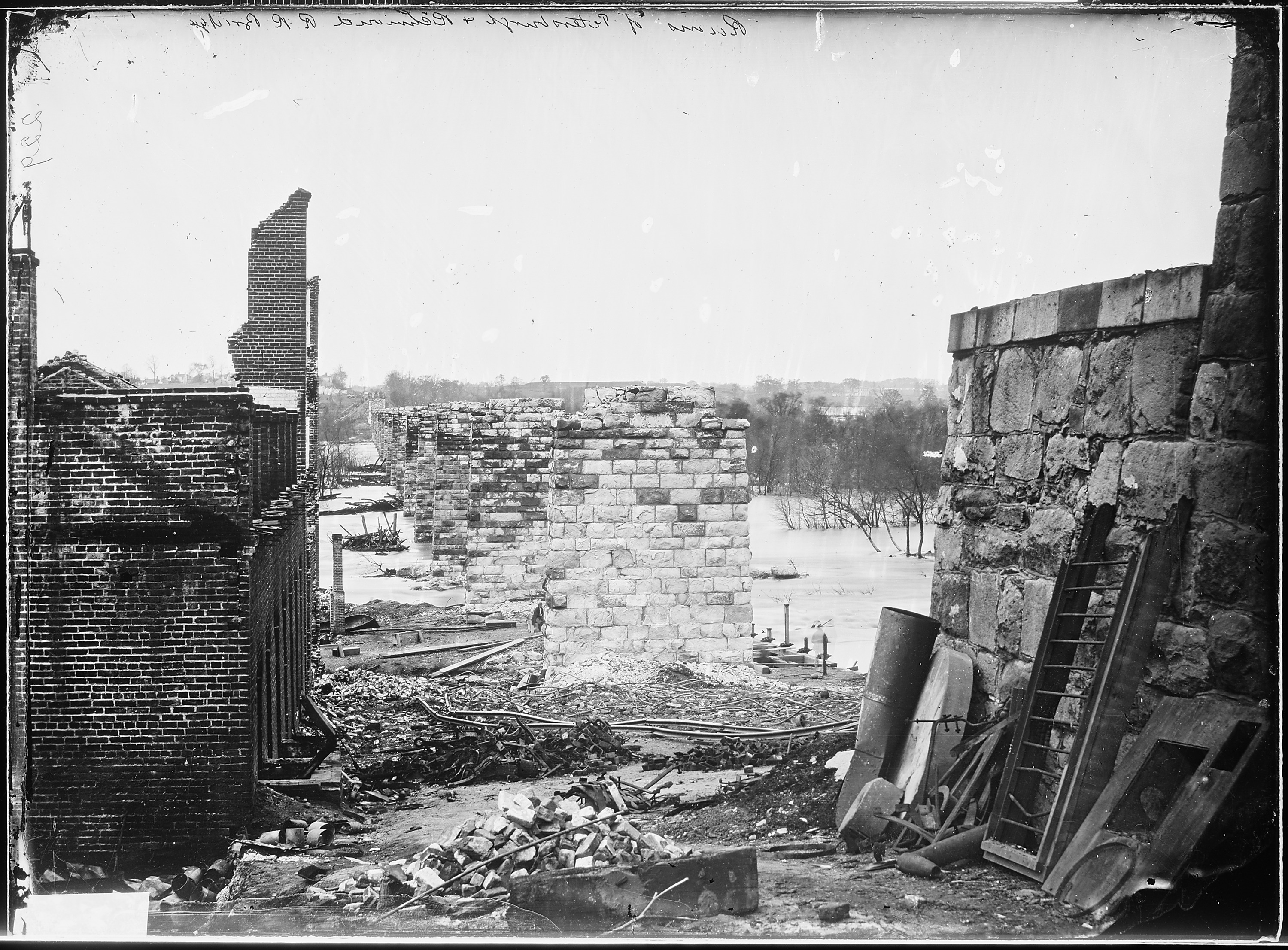
Rail bridge, Petersburg VA

The 11 Confederate States in the 1860 United States census had 297 towns and cities totaling 835,000 people; of these, 162 (with 681,000 people) were at one point occupied by Union forces. Eleven were destroyed or severely damaged in the war, including Atlanta (with an 1860 population of 9,600), Charleston (40,500), Columbia (8,100), and Richmond (37,900); all 11 had 115,900 residents in the 1860 census, or 14% of the urban South. Historians have not estimated what their actual population was when Union forces arrived. The number of people counted in 1860 who lived in the Confederacy's destroyed towns represented just over 1 percent of its 1860 population. In addition, 45 courthouses (out of a total of 830) were destroyed.

The South's agriculture was not highly mechanized. The value of farm implements and machinery in the 1860 Census was $81 million; by 1870, it had diminished by 40 percent and was worth just $48 million. Many old tools had broken through heavy use; new tools were rarely available, and even repairs were difficult. These economic losses affected everyone. Most banks and insurance companies had gone bankrupt. Confederate currency and bonds were worthless. The billions of dollars invested in slaves vanished. Most debts were also left behind. Most farms were intact but had lost their horses, mules, and cattle. Paskoff shows the loss of farm infrastructure was about the same whether or not fighting took place nearby. The loss of infrastructure and productive capacity meant that rural widows throughout the region faced not only the absence of able-bodied men, but a depleted stock of material resources. During four years of warfare, disruption, and blockades, the South used up about half its capital stock.

The rebuilding took years and was hindered by the low price of cotton after the war. Outside investment was essential, especially in railroads. One historian has summarized the collapse of the transportation infrastructure needed for economic recovery:

One of the greatest calamities which confronted Southerners was the havoc wrought on the transportation system. Roads were impassable or nonexistent, and bridges were destroyed or washed away. The important river traffic was at a standstill: levees were broken, channels were blocked, the few steamboats which had not been captured or destroyed were in a state of disrepair, wharves had decayed or were missing, and trained personnel were dead or dispersed. Horses, mules, oxen, carriages, wagons, and carts had nearly all fallen prey at one time or another to the contending armies. The railroads were paralyzed, with most of the companies bankrupt. These lines had been the special target of the enemy. On one stretch of 114 miles in Alabama, every bridge and trestle was destroyed, cross-ties rotten, buildings burned, water-tanks gone, ditches filled up, and tracks grown up in weeds and bushes ... Communication centers like Columbia and Atlanta were in ruins; shops and foundries were wrecked or in disrepair. Even those areas bypassed by battle had been pirated for equipment needed on the battlefront, and the wear and tear of wartime usage without adequate repairs or replacements reduced all to a state of disintegration.

=== Effect on women and families ===
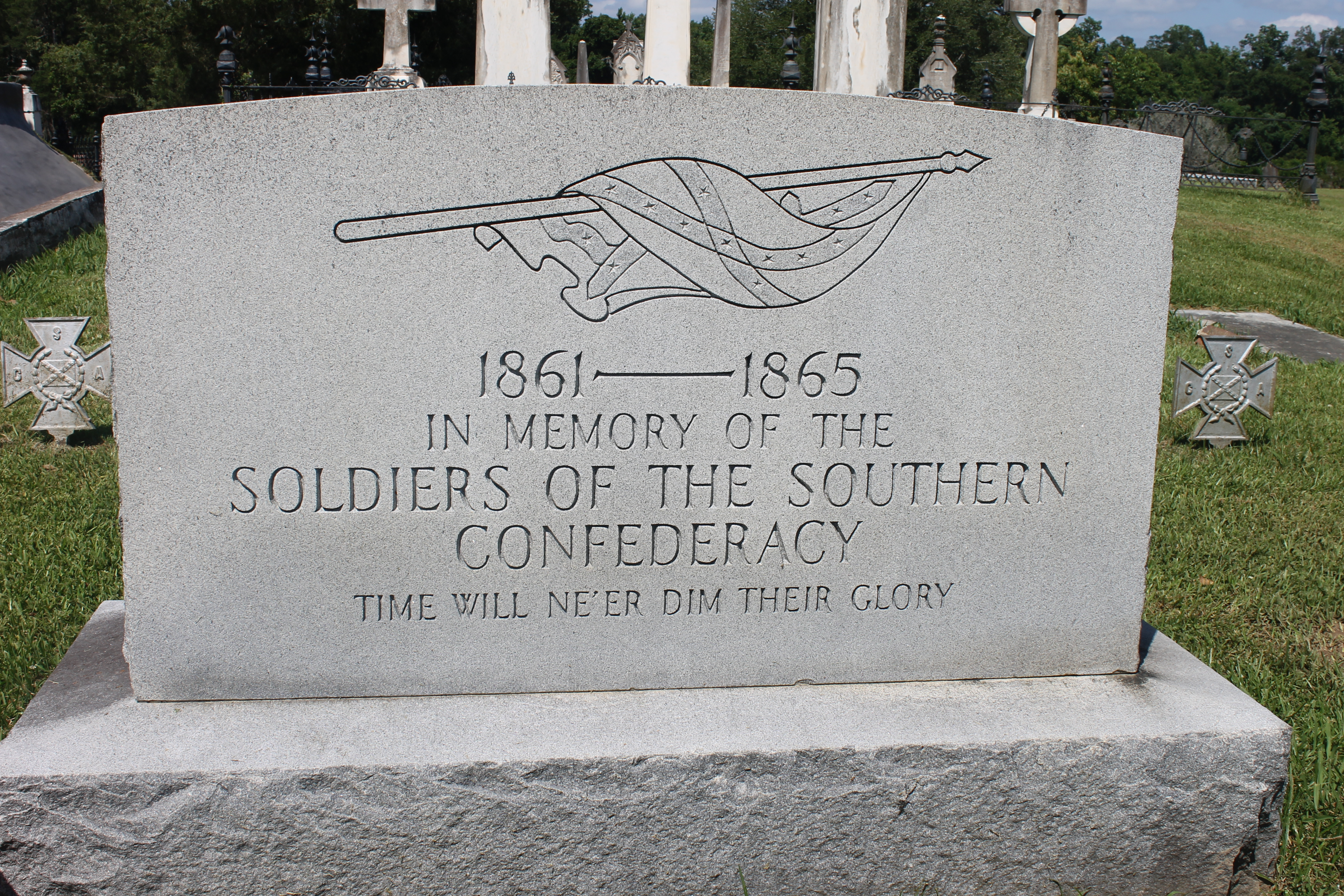
This Confederate memorial tombstone at Natchez City Cemetery is in Natchez, Mississippi.

More than 250,000 Confederate soldiers died during the war. Some widows abandoned their family farms and merged into the households of relatives, or even became refugees living in camps with high rates of disease and death. In the Old South, being an "old maid" was an embarrassment to the woman and her family, but after the war, it became almost a norm. Some women welcomed the freedom of not having to marry. Divorce, while never fully accepted, became more common. The concept of the "New Woman" emerged – she was self-sufficient and independent, and stood in sharp contrast to the "Southern Belle" of antebellum lore.

== National flags ==
Flags of the Confederate States of America

1st National Flag
[7, 9, 11, 13 stars]
"Stars and Bars"

2nd National Flag
[Richmond Capitol]
"Stainless Banner"

3rd National Flag
[never flown]
"Blood Stained Banner"

CSA Naval Jack
1863–65

Battle Flag
"Southern Cross"

This Confederate Battle Flag pattern is the one most often thought of as the Confederate Flag. It is one of many used by the Confederate armed forces. Variations of this design served as the Battle Flag of the Armies of Northern Virginia and Tennessee, and as the Confederate Naval Jack.

The first official flag of the Confederate States of America—called the "Stars and Bars"—originally had seven stars, representing the first seven states that initially formed the Confederacy. As more states joined, more stars were added, until the total was 13 (two stars were added for the divided states of Kentucky and Missouri). During the First Battle of Bull Run (known to the Confederates as First Manassas), it sometimes proved difficult to distinguish the Stars and Bars from the Union flag. To rectify the situation, a separate "Battle Flag" was designed for use by troops in the field. Also known as the "Southern Cross", many variations sprang from the original square configuration.

Although it was never officially adopted by the Confederate government, the popularity of the Southern Cross among both soldiers and the civilian population was a primary reason why it was made the main color feature when a new national flag was adopted in 1863. This new standard—known as the "Stainless Banner"—consisted of a lengthened white field area with a Battle Flag canton. This flag too had its problems when used in military operations as, on a windless day, it could easily be mistaken for a flag of truce or surrender. Thus, in 1865, a modified version of the Stainless Banner was adopted. This final national flag of the Confederacy kept the Battle Flag canton, but shortened the white field and added a vertical red bar to the fly end.

The "Confederate Flag" has a color scheme similar to that of the most common Battle Flag design, but is rectangular, not square. The "Confederate Flag" is a highly recognizable symbol of the South in the United States today and continues to be a controversial icon.

== Southern Unionism ==
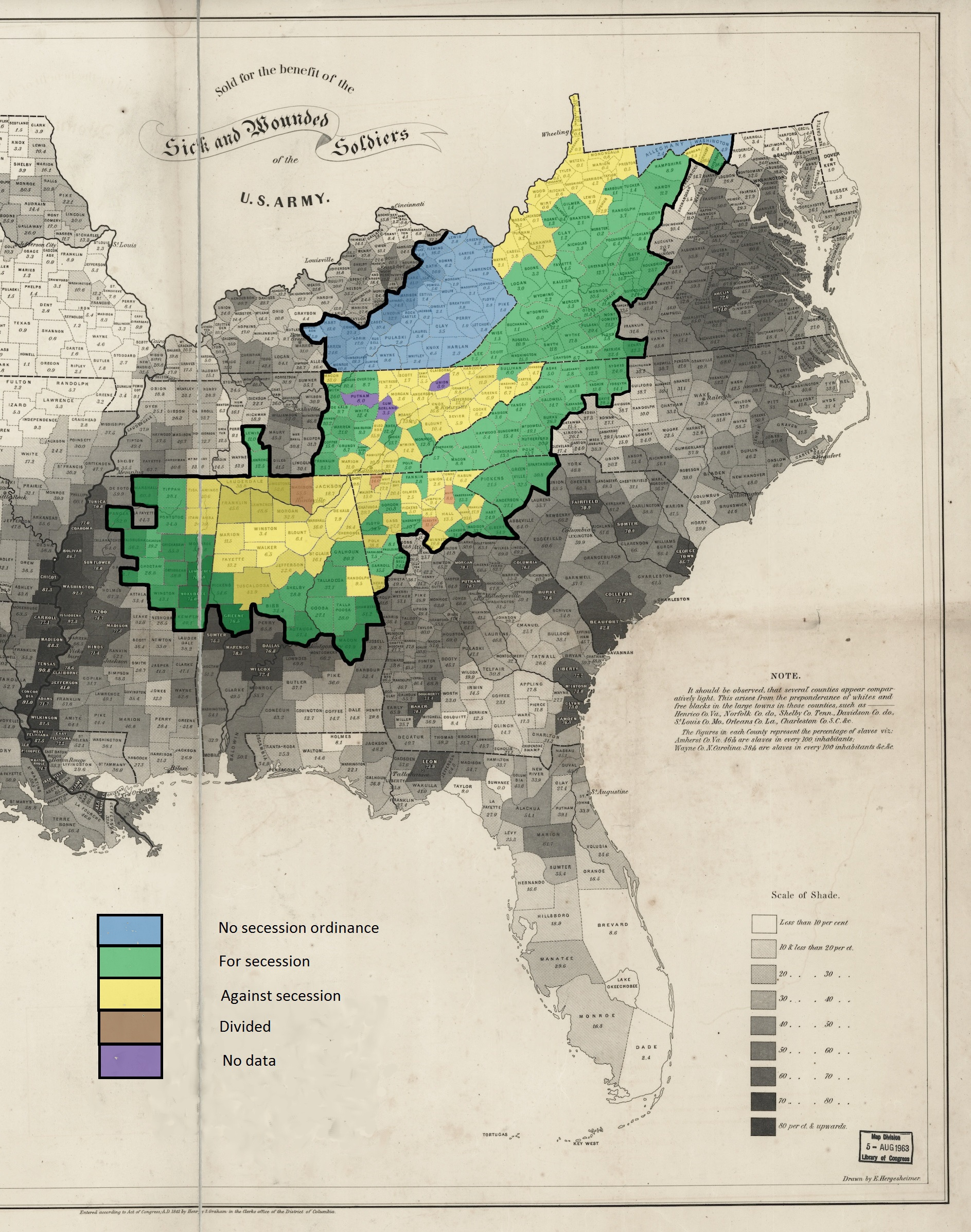
Map of the county secession votes of 1860–1861 in Appalachia within the ARC definition. Virginia and Tennessee show the public votes, while the other states show the vote by county delegates to the conventions.

Unionism—opposition to the Confederacy—was strong in certain areas within the Confederate States. Southern Unionists were widespread in the mountain regions of Appalachia and the Ozarks. Unionists, led by Parson Brownlow and Senator Andrew Johnson, took control of East Tennessee in 1863. Unionists also attempted control over western Virginia, but never effectively held more than half of the counties that formed the new state of West Virginia. Union forces captured parts of coastal North Carolina, and at first were largely welcomed by local unionists. The occupiers became perceived as oppressive, callous, radical and favorable to Freedmen. Occupiers pillaged, freed slaves, and evicted those who refused to swear loyalty oaths to the Union.

In Texas, local officials harassed and murdered Unionists. Draft resistance was widespread especially among Texans of German or Mexican descent, many of the latter leaving for Mexico. Confederate officials attempted to hunt down and kill potential draftees who had gone into hiding. Over 4,000 suspected Unionists were imprisoned in the Confederate States without trial.

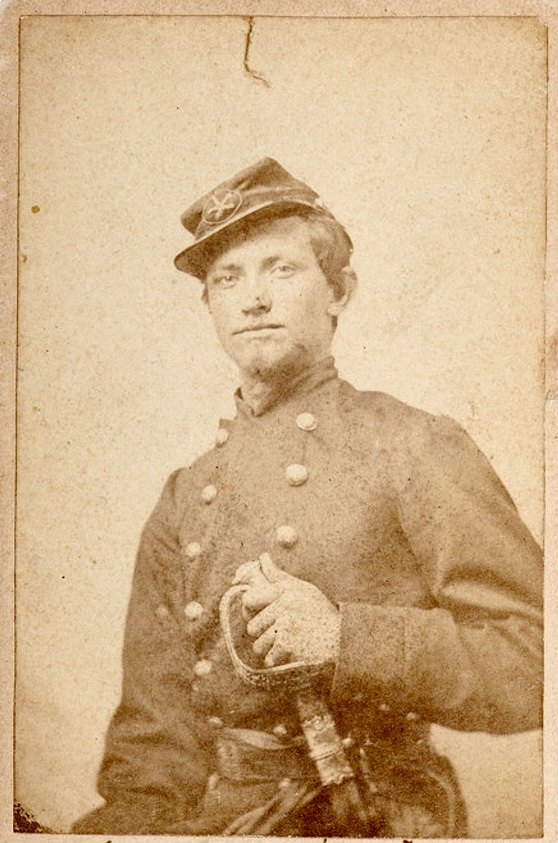
James Patton Brownlow, a 22-year-old cavalry colonel from Knoxville, and his regiment of Southern Unionist "mountaineers", were called "damned Tennessee Yankees" by Confederate troops.

Up to 100,000 men living in states under Confederate control served in the Union Army or pro-Union guerilla groups. Although Southern Unionists came from all classes, most differed socially, culturally, and economically from the region's dominant pre-war planter class.

== Geography ==
=== Region and climate ===
The Confederate States of America claimed a total of 2,919 miles (4,698 km) of coastline, thus a large part of its territory lay on the seacoast with level and often sandy or marshy ground. Most of the interior portion consisted of arable farmland, though much was also hilly and mountainous, and the far western territories were deserts. The southern reaches of the Mississippi River bisected the country, and the western half was often referred to as the Trans-Mississippi. The highest point (excluding Arizona and New Mexico) was Guadalupe Peak in Texas at 8,750 feet (2,670 m).

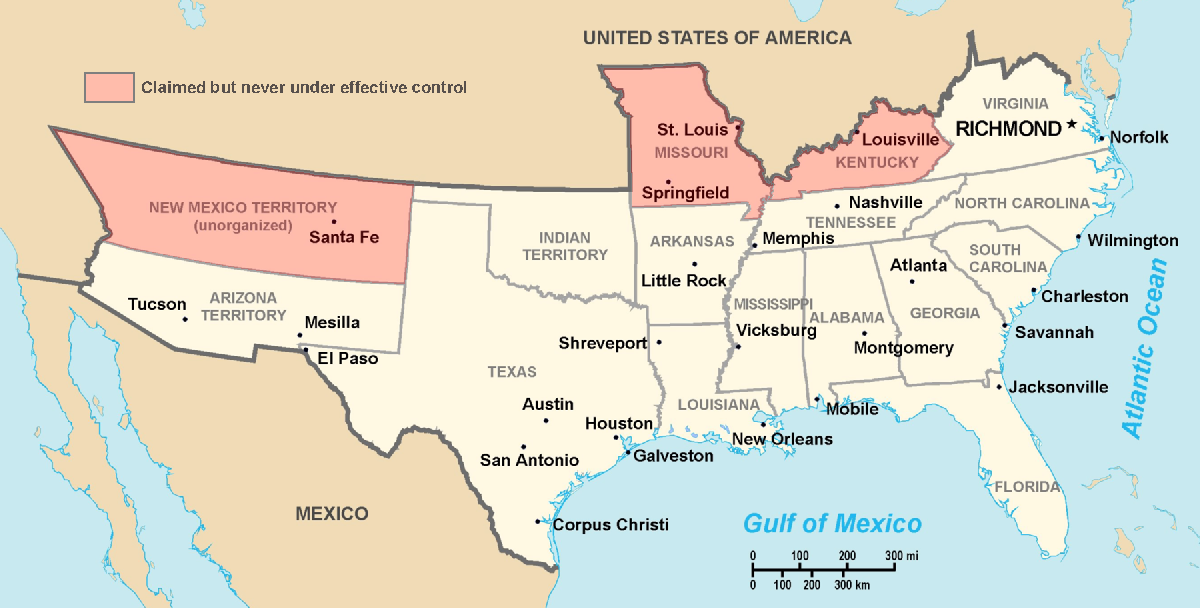
Map of the states and territories claimed by the Confederate States of America

A Köppen-Geiger climate map of the Confederate States of America

Most of the Confederacy had a humid subtropical climate with mild winters and long, hot, humid summers. The climate and terrain also contained vast swamps in Florida, semi-arid steppes and arid deserts in Texas, and cold and snowy climates in the Appalachian regions of Virginia, Tennessee, and North Carolina. The subtropical climate made winters mild but allowed infectious diseases such as malaria to flourish; more soldiers on both sides of the Civil War died from disease than combat.

== Demographics ==
=== Population ===
The 1860 United States census gives a picture of the population for the areas that had joined the Confederacy. The population numbers exclude non-assimilated Indian tribes.

State	Total popu- lation	Total number of slaves	Total number of house- holds	Total free popu- lation	Total number of slave- holders	% of Free popu- lation owning slaves	% of Free families owning slaves	Slaves as % of popu- lation	Total free colored
Alabama	964,201	435,080	96,603	529,121	33,730	6%	35%	45%	2,690
Arkansas	435,450	111,115	57,244	324,335	11,481	4%	20%	26%	144
Florida	140,424	61,745	15,090	78,679	5,152	7%	34%	44%	932
Georgia	1,057,286	462,198	109,919	595,088	41,084	7%	37%	44%	3,500
Louisiana	708,002	331,726	74,725	376,276	22,033	6%	29%	47%	18,647
Mississippi	791,305	436,631	63,015	354,674	30,943	9%	49%	55%	773
North Carolina	992,622	331,059	125,090	661,563	34,658	5%	28%	33%	30,463
South Carolina	703,708	402,406	58,642	301,302	26,701	9%	46%	57%	9,914
Tennessee	1,109,801	275,719	149,335	834,082	36,844	4%	25%	25%	7,300
Texas	604,215	182,566	76,781	421,649	21,878	5%	28%	30%	355
Virginia	1,596,318	490,865	201,523	1,105,453	52,128	5%	26%	31%	58,042
Total	9,103,332	3,521,110	1,027,967	5,582,222	316,632	6%	31%	39%	132,760

Age structure	0–14 years	15–59 years	60 years and over
White males	43%	52%	4%
White females	44%	52%	4%
Male slaves	44%	51%	4%
Female slaves	45%	51%	3%
Free black males	45%	50%	5%
Free black females	40%	54%	6%
Total population	44%	52%	4%

In 1860, the areas that later formed the 11 Confederate states (including the future West Virginia) had 132,760 (2%) free blacks. Males made up 49% of the total population and females 51%.

=== Rural and urban population ===
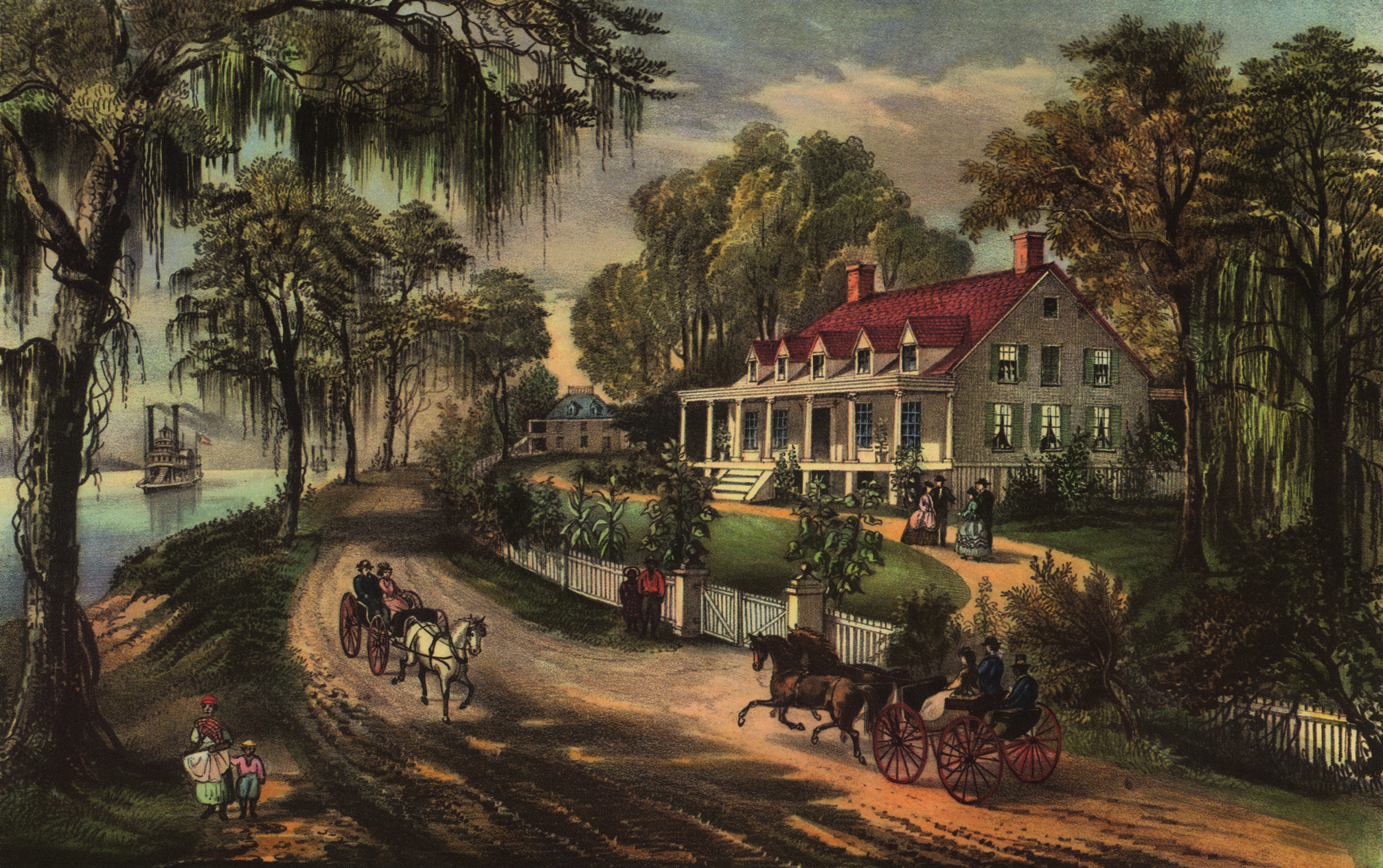
A Home on the Mississippi, Currier and Ives, 1871

The Confederacy was overwhelmingly rural. Few towns had populations of more than 1,000—the typical county seat had a population under 500. Of the twenty largest U.S. cities in the 1860 census, only New Orleans lay in Confederate territory. Only 13 Confederate-controlled cities ranked among the top 100 U.S. cities in 1860, most of them ports whose economic activities vanished or suffered severely in the Union blockade. The population of Richmond swelled after it became the Confederate capital, reaching an estimated 128,000 in 1864. Prior to Richmond's late surge in population, only New Orleans among Confederate cities had 100,000 or more residents.

The cities of the Confederacy included (by size of population):

#	City	1860 population	1860 U.S. rank	Return to U.S. control	Notes
1.	New Orleans, Louisiana	168,675	6	1862	See New Orleans in the American Civil War
2.	Charleston, South Carolina	40,522	22	1865	See Charleston in the American Civil War
3.	Richmond, Virginia	37,910	25	1865	See Richmond in the American Civil War
4.	Mobile, Alabama	29,258	27	1865	
5.	Memphis, Tennessee	22,623	38	1862	
6.	Savannah, Georgia	22,619	41	1864	
7.	Petersburg, Virginia	18,266	50	1865	
8.	Nashville, Tennessee	16,988	54	1862	See Nashville in the American Civil War
9.	Norfolk, Virginia	14,620	61	1862	
10.	Alexandria, Virginia	12,652	75	1861	
11.	Augusta, Georgia	12,493	77	1865	
12.	Columbus, Georgia	9,621	97	1865	
13.	Atlanta, Georgia	9,554	99	1864	See Atlanta in the American Civil War
14.	Wilmington, North Carolina	9,553	100	1865	See Wilmington, North Carolina in the American Civil War

=== Religion ===
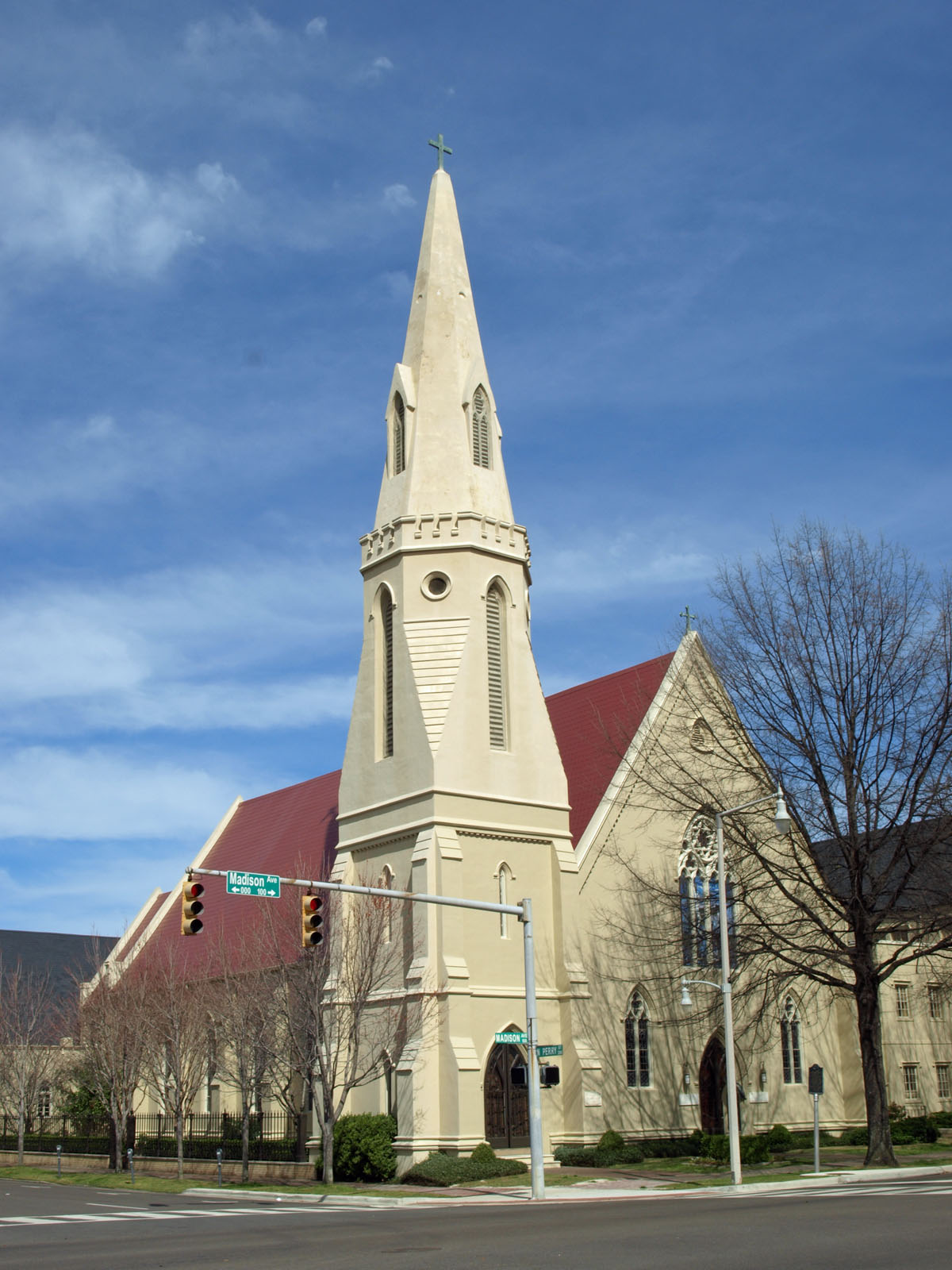
St. John's Episcopal Church, Montgomery. The Secession Convention of Southern Churches was held here in 1861.

The majority of people who lived in the Confederate states were Protestant. Most of both the free and enslaved populations identified with evangelical Protestantism. Baptists and Methodists. The slave population formed the Black church. Freedom of religion and separation of church and state were protected by Confederate laws. Church attendance was very high and chaplains played a major role in the Army.

Most large denominations experienced a North–South split in the prewar era on the issue of slavery. The creation of a new country necessitated independent structures. For example, the Presbyterian Church in the United States split, with much of the new leadership provided by Joseph Ruggles Wilson. Baptists and Methodists both broke off from their Northern coreligionists over the slavery issue, forming the Southern Baptist Convention and the Methodist Episcopal Church, South. Elites in the southeast favored the Protestant Episcopal Church in the Confederate States of America, which had reluctantly split from the Episcopal Church in 1861. Other elites were Presbyterians belonging to the 1861-founded Presbyterian Church in the United States. Catholics included an Irish working-class element in coastal cities and an old French element in southern Louisiana.

The southern churches met the shortage of Army chaplains by sending missionaries. One result was wave after wave of revivals in the Army.

== Legacy and assessment ==
=== Amnesty and treason issue ===
When the war ended, President Andrew Johnson granted pardons to more than 14,000 Confederates who had petitioned for them. He issued a general amnesty to all Confederate participants in the "late Civil War" in 1868. Congress passed additional Amnesty Acts in May 1866 with restrictions on office holding, and the Amnesty Act in May 1872 lifting those restrictions. There was a great deal of discussion in 1865 about bringing treason trials, especially against Jefferson Davis. There was no consensus in President Johnson's cabinet, and no one was charged with treason. An acquittal of Davis would have been humiliating for the government.

Davis was indicted for treason but never tried; he was released from prison on bail in May 1867. The amnesty of December 25, 1868, eliminated any possibility of Davis standing trial for treason.

Henry Wirz, the commandant of a notorious prisoner-of-war camp near Andersonville, Georgia, was convicted by a military court of charges related to cruelty and conspiracy, and executed on November 10, 1865.

The U.S. government began a decade-long process known as Reconstruction which attempted to resolve the political and constitutional issues of the Civil War. The priorities were: to guarantee that Confederate nationalism and slavery were ended, to ratify and enforce the Thirteenth Amendment which outlawed slavery; the Fourteenth which guaranteed dual U.S. and state citizenship to all native-born residents, regardless of race; the Fifteenth, which made it illegal to deny the right to vote because of race; and repeal each state's ordinance of secession. By 1877, the Compromise of 1877 ended Reconstruction in the former Confederate states. Federal troops were withdrawn. The war left the entire region economically devastated by military action, ruined infrastructure, and exhausted resources. Still dependent on an agricultural economy and resisting investment in infrastructure, it remained dominated by the planter elite into the next century. Democrat-dominated legislatures passed new constitutions and amendments to exclude most blacks and many poor whites. This exclusion and a weakened Republican Party remained the norm until the Voting Rights Act of 1965. The Solid South of the early 20th century did not achieve national levels of prosperity until long after World War II.

=== Supreme Court rulings ===
In Texas v. White (1869), the Supreme Court ruled by a 5–3 majority that Texas had remained a state ever since it first joined the Union, despite claims that it joined the Confederate States of America. The Court held that the Constitution did not permit a state to unilaterally secede. In declaring that no state could leave the Union, "except through revolution or through consent of the States", it was "explicitly repudiating the position of the Confederate states that the United States was a voluntary compact between sovereign states". In Sprott v. United States (1874), the Supreme Court ruled 8–1 to reaffirm its conclusion in White and held that the Confederacy's "foundation was treason" and its "single purpose, so long as it lasted, was to make that treason successful."

=== Theories regarding downfall ===
Historian Frank Lawrence Owsley argued that the Confederacy "died of states' rights". The central government was denied requisitioned soldiers and money by governors and state legislatures because they feared that Richmond would encroach on the rights of the states. Georgia's governor Joseph Brown warned of a secret conspiracy by Jefferson Davis to destroy states' rights and individual liberty. The first conscription act in North America, authorizing Davis to draft soldiers, was said to be the "essence of military despotism". Roger Lowenstein argued that the Confederacy's failure to raise adequate revenue led to hyperinflation and being unable to win a war of attrition, despite the prowess of its military leadership such as Robert E. Lee.

Though political differences were within the Confederacy, no national political parties were formed because they were seen as illegitimate. "Anti-partyism became an article of political faith." Without a system of political parties building alternate sets of national leaders, electoral protests tended to be narrowly state-based, "negative, carping and petty". The 1863 mid-term elections became mere expressions of futile and frustrated dissatisfaction. According to historian David M. Potter, the lack of a functioning two-party system caused "real and direct damage" to the Confederate war effort since it prevented the formulation of any effective alternatives to the conduct of the war by the Davis administration.

The enemies of President Davis proposed that the Confederacy "died of Davis". He was unfavorably compared to George Washington by critics such as Edward Alfred Pollard, editor of the most influential newspaper in the Confederacy, the Daily Richmond Examiner. Beyond the early honeymoon period, Davis was never popular. Ellis Merton Coulter, viewed by historians as a Confederate apologist, argues that Davis was unable to mobilize Confederate nationalism in support of his government effectively, and especially failed to appeal to the small farmers who made up the bulk of the population. Davis failed to build a network of supporters who would speak up when he came under criticism, and he repeatedly alienated governors and other state-based leaders by demanding centralized control of the war effort.

== See also ==
- Cabinet of the Confederate States of America
- Confederate colonies
- Confederate Patent Office
- Confederate war finance
- C.S.A.: The Confederate States of America
- History of the Southern United States
- Knights of the Golden Circle
- List of Confederate arms manufacturers
- List of Confederate arsenals and armories
- List of Confederate monuments and memorials
- List of treaties of the Confederate States of America
- List of historical separatist movements
- List of wars involving the Confederate States of America
- Confederate States Army
