= Knight Kadosh =

Masonic degree

The Knight Kadosh is a Freemasonic degree or ceremony of initiation performed by a number of Supreme Councils of the Ancient and Accepted Scottish Rite of Freemasonry. It is the 30th Degree of the Southern Jurisdiction of the Scottish Rite for the United States, the Ancient and Accepted Scottish Rite of Freemasonry of Canada and the International Order of Freemasonry for Men and Women, LE DROIT HUMAIN. The Northern Masonic Jurisdiction of the Scottish Rite, does not currently confer a degree with the name Knight Kadosh. Instead its thirtieth degree is entitled "Grand Inspector."

The term "Kadosh" is derived from the Hebrew word קדוש, which means holy or consecrated. "Kadosh" and "Knight Kadosh" is often abbreviated in masonic documents as "K--H∴" and "K∴K∴D∴H".

== History ==
The earliest recorded portrayal of the "Knight Kadosh" degree can be linked to the Council of Emperors of the East and West in 1758. This council united several Masonic degrees being conducted in 18th century Paris, France. The "Knight Kadosh," or originally "Illustrious and Grand Commander of the White and Black Eagle, Grand Elect Kadosh," was part of a full complement of twenty-five degrees or grades governed by this council. The "Knight Kadosh" was the twenty-fourth degree of this complement.

In 1801, the first and oldest Supreme Council of the Scottish Rite was founded in Charleston, South Carolina. This body adopted many of the degrees of the Council of Emperors of the East and West, including that of "Knight Kadosh." The "Knight Kadosh" degree was adopted as the thirtieth degree and was simply titled "Knight Kadosh." The degree received a substantial re-write in the 1850s when Albert Pike was Grand Commander of the Southern Jurisdiction of the United States. It was further revised in 2000.

A different form of the Knight Kadosh degree, using a ritual not authored by Pike, was for many years performed in the Northern Masonic Jurisdiction of the United States, headquartered at Lexington, Massachusetts. However, that body no longer performs the degree.

== Lesson of the Degree ==
Like all Masonic Degrees, the Knight Kadosh Degree attempts to teach the initiates a series of moral lessons by the use of allegory and symbolism. The lesson in the Southern Jurisdiction of the Knight Kadosh Degree is that Masons should be "true to ourselves, to stand for what is right and just in our lives today. To believe in God, country and ourselves."

== Controversy ==
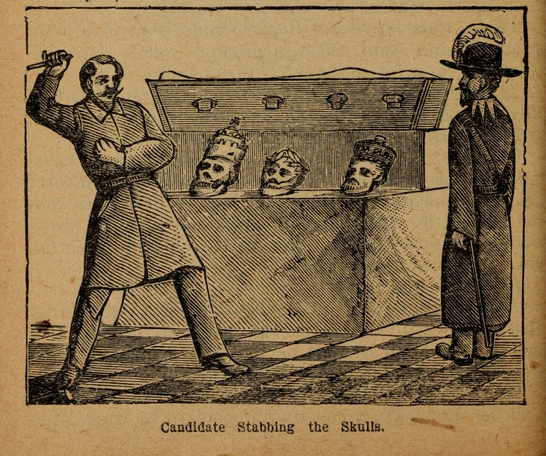
Candidate stabbing three skulls, including one with a tiara, as depicted in a script describing Scottish Rite ritual, 1905

The Knight Kadosh degree has occasionally been accused of being anti-Catholic.

Pike's book Morals and Dogma of the Ancient and Accepted Scottish Rite of Freemasonry, first published in 1871, mentions hostility to the papal tiara by the historical Knights Templar when discussing the Kadosh degree.

As early as 1905, an expose of Scottish Rite ritual specifically describes the stabbing of a skull crowned with a tiara. This expose was originally written by abolitionist Jonathan Blanchard, leader of the post-Civil War Second Anti-Masonic Party.

The 1918 edition of the Catholic Encyclopedia stated that in the ceremony in use in the Southern Jurisdiction of the Ancient and Accepted Scottish Rite in the United States and written by Albert Pike, the Papal tiara is trampled during the initiation. This accusation was repeated by Father William Saunders in the Arlington Catholic Herald in 1996.

Masonic author Frank Conway, in a book reviewing both the history and current practice of rituals for both the NMJ and SJ, written in 2017, describes the Knight Kadosh degree as involving "three skulls, one with a crown, one with a Pope's tiara, and one wrapped in laurel leaves."
