= Walter E. Webber =

Masonic leader; attorney

- Webber pictured around 2004

Sovereign Grand Commander of the Scottish Rite of Freemasonry for the Northern Jurisdiction of the United States
- In office September 2003 – April 22, 2006
- Preceded by: Robert Odel Ralston
- Succeeded by: John William McNaughton

Personal details
- Born: July 31, 1943 Old Town, Maine, U.S.
- Died: April 22, 2006 (aged 62) Lexington, Massachusetts, U.S.
- Education: Marietta College; Boston College Law School

Walter Ernest Webber (July 31, 1943 – April 22, 2006) was an American lawyer and Freemason who served as the nineteenth Sovereign Grand Commander of the Scottish Rite of Freemasonry for the Northern Jurisdiction of the United States between 2003 and 2006.

A member of the American Bar Association, he was regularly listed in The Best Lawyers in America.

== Early life ==
Webber was born in 1943 in Old Town, Maine, to Philip and Velma Webber.

He was a 1965 graduate of Marietta College in Ohio. At his commencement, he was awarded the William Bay Irvine Award, an acknowledgment of being an outstanding member of his class. He later served on the college's board of trustees, and became vice-chairman of the board.

Webber graduated from Boston College Law School in 1969.

== Career ==
Webber worked for many years as a lawyer for Jensen Baird Gardner & Henry in Portland, Maine, whom he joined upon graduation in 1969. He later became one of its senior directors and its first president.

A 33rd Degree Scottish Rite Mason since 1987, Webber had been the District Deputy Grand Master of the Grand Lodge of Maine for many years, and was elected to the board of directors of the Scottish Rite Supreme Council in 1994. That year, he helped establish the 32nd Degree Masonic Learning Centers for Children, which afforded children with dyslexia one-on-one tutoring at over fifty centers in the Northeastern and Midwestern states.

In September 2003, after accepting the role of Sovereign Grand Commander of the Scottish Rite of Freemasonry for the Northern Jurisdiction of the United States, he moved to Lexington, Massachusetts, where the headquarters is located.

Also in 2003, Webber was awarded the Josiah Drummond Medal by the Grand Lodge of Maine. Drummond, himself, had earlier served in the same position as Webber in the Scottish Rite, the post of Sovereign Grand Commander.

After Webber's death, John William McNaughton succeeded him as Sovereign Grand Commander.

== Personal life ==
Webber moved to Yarmouth, Maine, in 1970. He became a long-term member of the town's First Parish Congregational Church, and served on its board of trustees. He was also chairman of the board of York Mutual Insurance Company of Maine and of Maine Medical Center's Brighton Campus (then known as the Osteopathic Hospital of Maine).

Webber was married for 41 years to Leslie, with whom he had three children.

== Death ==
Webber died of cancer in 2006 in Lexington, Massachusetts, aged 62. A memorial service was held at the Scottish Rite Masonic Museum & Library on April 30.

== Legacy ==
In 2001, a scholarship fund was established in his name by the trustees of Marietta College. The fund provided financial assistance to "worthy and deserving students."

A portrait of Webber hangs in the Reading Room of the Masonic Hall in Portland.
