= Albert Pike Memorial Temple =

Scottish Rite building in Little Rock, Arkansas

- U.S. National Register of Historic Places
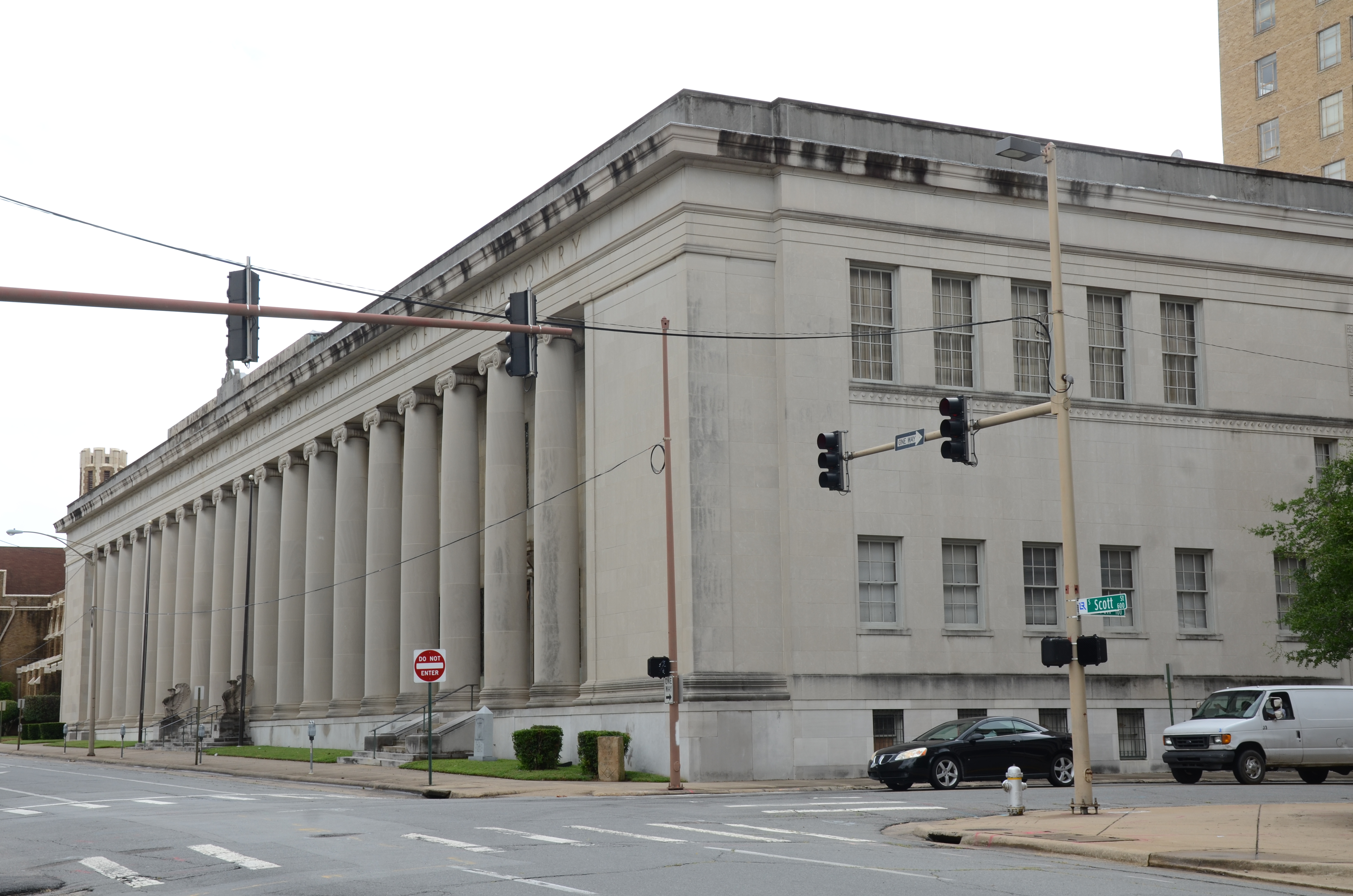

- Location within Arkansas Location within the United States
- Location: 700-724 Scott St., Little Rock, Arkansas
- Coordinates: 34°44′30″N 92°16′14″W
- Area: 1 acre (0.40 ha)
- Built: 1924
- Architectural style: Classical Revival
- MPS: Little Rock Main Street MRA
- NRHP reference No.: 86003118
- Added to NRHP: November 13, 1986

The Albert Pike Memorial Temple is a historic Scottish Rite building. It also houses the York Rite Chapter, Council, Commandery, and has 2 Masonic lodges at 700-724 Scott Street in Little Rock, Arkansas. It is an imposing 156,000 square foot three-story plus basement and rigging loft Classical Revival structure. It is finished in Indiana limestone, and features a long colonnade of 19 40-foot (12 m) Ionic columns on its front facade, which occupies one city block.

Entry is gained to the building via three sets of massive bronze doors flanked by cast concrete eagles. Completed in 1924, it was designed by local Masons George R. Mann and Eugene Stern who are best known for the design of the Arkansas Capitol Building. It is named in honor of Albert Pike.

Constructed by Sovereign Grand Inspector General (SGIG) and Lieutenant Grand Commander Charles E. Rosenbaum, known for his work as building committee chairman for the Scottish Rite House of the Temple in Washington D.C. The current building is the third consistory building built on the site, and has been called “The Jewel of the Southern Jurisdiction.”

The building is home to the Valley of Little Rock, but has many offices occupied by different organizations within the Masonic Fraternity. The offices found in the building are: the administrative offices of the Scottish Rite for the Orient of Arkansas, Grand Lodge of Arkansas, General Grand Chapter Royal Arch Masons International, and the Grand York Rite for the State of Arkansas. Additionally, the other lodges and bodies found within the building are: Western Star Lodge #2, Albert Pike Lodge #714, Arkansas College of Societas Rosicruciana In Civitatibus Foederatus (SRICF), Union Chapter #2, Royal Arch Masons Occidental Council #1, Royal and Select Masters and Hugh de Payens Commandery #1 Knights Templar

The Valley of Little Rock Scottish Rite Orient of Arkansas has the distinction of being one of 5 states to originally have a Grand Consistory. The Little Rock bodies are known as the first to use lights, props, theater drops, robes, and perform dramatized degrees in the Southern Jurisdiction. They also were the first to institute a "Camp Guard" for degree and ceremonial use.

The building suffered a near catastrophic fire in 1952 where the oldest part of building caught fire and burned. The building was then "modernized" with new climate control mechanisms and facilities.

The building was listed on the National Register of Historic Places in 1986.

In 2014 the building was made "open to the public" for rentals to much success. The following year the local opera company "Opera in the Rock" chose the Albert Pike Memorial Temple as the venue to host Mozart's classic opera "The Magic Flute."

It is the only edifice in Arkansas, and one of the very few around the country, that regularly confers the 33rd degree and performs the Investiture of the Knight Commander of the Court of Honor.

== See also ==
- National Register of Historic Places listings in Little Rock, Arkansas
