= Edward Raymond =

Edward Raymond may refer to:

- Edward Burleson Raymond (1848–1914), rancher, politician, banker, and founder of Raymondville, Texas
- Edward Asa Raymond, Grand Master of the Masonic Grand Lodge of Massachusetts, 1849-1851
