= The Old Canoe =

Poem by Emily Rebecca Page

"The Old Canoe" was written by Emily Rebecca Page in 1849, appearing in the Portland Transcript. The poem begins: "Where the rocks are gray and the shore is steep". It was included in school readers and books on elocution, receiving general recognition as a work of merit.

The Old Canoe

Where the rocks are gray and the shore is steep,
And the waters below look dark and deep,
Where the rugged pine, in its lonely pride,
Leans gloomily over the murky tide,
Where the reeds and rushes are long and rank,
And the weeds grow thick on the winding bank,
Where the shadow is heavy the whole day through,—
There lies at its moorings the old canoe.

The useless paddles are idly dropped,
Like a sea-bird's wings that the storm had lopped,
And crossed on the railing one o'er one,
Like the folded hands when the work is done;
While busily back and forth between
The spider stretches his silvery screen,
And the solemn owl, with his dull " too-hoo,'"
Settles down on the side of the old canoe.

The stern, half sunk in the slimy wave,
Rots slowly away in its living grave,
And the green moss creeps o'er its dull decay,
Hiding its mouldering dust away,
Like the hand that plants o'er the tomb a flower
Or the ivy that mantles the falling tower;
While many a blossom of loveliest hue
Springs up o'er the stern of the old canoe.

The currentless waters are dead and still,
But the light wind plays with the boat at will,
And lazily in and out again
It floats the length of the rusty chain,
Like the weary march of the hands of time,
That meet and part at the noontide chime;
And the shore is kissed at each turning anew,
By the drippling bow of the old canoe.

Oh, many a time, with a careless hand,
I have pushed it away from the pebbly strand,
And paddled it down where the stream runs quick,
Where the whirls are wild and the eddies are thick,
And laughed as I leaned o'er the rocking side,
And looked below in the broken tide,
To see that the faces and boats were two,
That were mirrored back from the old canoe.

But now, as I lean o'er the crumbling side,
And look below in the sluggish tide,
The face that I see there is graver grown,
And the laugh that I hear has a soberer tone,
And the hands that lent to the light skiff wings
Have grown familiar with sterner things.
But I love to think of the hours that sped
As I rocked where the whirls their white spray shed,
Ere the blossoms waved, or the green grass grew
O'er the mouldering stern of the old canoe.

== Publication history ==
Dr. Robert Looney Caruthers White, of Nashville, who was authority on literary matters, came to the rescue when the poem's authorship was brought into question. In Trotwood's Monthly he commented: "In your March issue, reprinting the familiar poem, "The Old Canoe," which the anthology-makers so persistently ascribe to the late Gen. Albert Pike, you say: "Like many other good poems, It was, perhaps, the only one some poet wrote, and, never thinking itt would be immortal, or that it had any special merit, failed to sign his name to it. . . . Its authorship has never before, perhaps, been publicly corrected." Both these statements are erroneous. Nine years ago, when Miss Jennie Thornley Clarke's "Songs of the South" was published, it contained this poem, marked "anonymous." As I chanced to know its real authorship, and hence knew that it lacked several hundreds of miles, geographically speaking, of being a "song of the South," I sent a communication to the New York Critic, which was printed in its issue of March 13, 1897, giving the facts. I have several times since publicly corrected the statement that General Albert Pike was the author of the poem. The actual author was Miss Emily Rebecca Page, who was born in Bradford, Vt., in 1834, and died in Chelsea, Mass., in 1862. "The Old Canoe" was written in 1849, and appeared in the Portland Transcript in that year. It was not by any means "the only one the poet wrote." Miss Page was a voluminous writer of both verse and prose, having been a constant contributor to many New England periodicals. She was later assistant editor of Gleason's Pictorial and The Flag of Our Union, two Boston literary publications which were very popular forty or fifty years ago. She also published several volumes of poetry. -R. L. C. WHITE. Nashville, February 26, 1906."

It was suggested that the authorship of the poem was fastened upon Pike because about the time of its publication, when it was going the rounds of the press, probably without any credit, a doggerel called "The Old Canoe" was composed about Pike by one of his political foes, the subject of it being a canoe in which he left Columbia, Tennessee, when a young man practicing law in that place. Pike himself stated to Senator Edward W. Carmack that he was not the author of "The Old Canoe," and could not imagine how he ever got the credit for it.

Elizabeth Akers Allen also addressed the error in author attribution in Carleton's Record of the Year: A Reference Scrap Book saying, "By a natural enough mistake, or rather a repetition of another's mistake, you print in your Record for June, crediting it to Albert Pike, a poem entitled " The Old Canoe." It is not his, having been written originally by a young girl, Miss Emily Rebecca Page, a native of Bradford, Vermont. She was born and passed most of her short life in a quiet place on the Vermont bank of the Connecticut river, near the "toll-bridge," which was mentioned last week in the papers as having been carried off by the freshet, near Piermont. I am positive about the matter, as I was well acquainted with her in her school-days. I had occasion to correct this same error in a New York daily two or three years ago. If my name is strange to you, I can refer you to Mr. B. P. Shillaber, of Chelsea, Massachusetts, who will assure you that I am in the right, as he was a friend of Miss Page when she was copy-holder in the office of Bailors Pictorial, Boston. She was not more than sixteen or seventeen years of age when she wrote this poem, notably her best, although it bears evidence of the youth and inexperience of the writer. Poetry, I know, is rather a drug in the market, but even verse-writers have their rights, and should not be cheated of their own, especially after they are dead, and cannot defend themselves."
