= Shill =

Person who publicly helps or gives credibility to assist in a fraud

A shill, also called a plant or a stooge, is a person who publicly helps or gives credibility to a person or organization without disclosing that they have a close relationship with said person or organization, or have been paid to do so. Shills can carry out their operations in the areas of media, journalism, marketing, politics, sports, confidence games, cryptocurrency, or other business areas. A shill may also act to discredit opponents or critics of the person or organization in which they have a vested interest.

In most uses, shill refers to someone who purposely gives onlookers, participants or "marks" the impression of an enthusiastic customer independent of the seller, marketer or con artist, for whom they are secretly working. The person or group in league with the shill relies on crowd psychology to encourage other onlookers or audience members to do business with the seller or accept the ideas they are promoting. Shills may be employed by salespeople and professional marketing campaigns. Plant and stooge more commonly refer to a person who is secretly in league with another person or outside organization while pretending to be neutral or part of the organization in which they are planted, such as a magician's audience, a political party, or an intelligence organization (see double agent).

Shilling is illegal in many circumstances and under many jurisdictions because of the potential for fraud and damage. However, if a shill does not place uninformed parties at a risk of loss, the shill's actions may be legal. For example, a person planted in an audience to laugh and applaud when desired (see claque), or to participate in on-stage activities as a "random member of the audience", is a legal type of shill.

== Etymology ==
The origin of the term "shill" is uncertain; it may be an abbreviation of "shillaber". The word originally denoted a carnival worker who pretended to be a member of the audience in an attempt to elicit interest in an attraction. Some sources trace the usage back to 1914, or as far back as 1911. American humorist Benjamin Penhallow Shillaber (1814–1890), who often wrote under the guise of his fictional character Mrs. Ruth Partington, the American version of Mrs. Malaprop, is a possible source.

== Internet ==
In online discussion media, shills make posts expressing opinions that further interests of an organization in which they have a vested interest, such as a commercial vendor or special interest group, while posing as unrelated innocent parties. For example, an employee of a company that produces a specific product might praise the product anonymously in a discussion forum or group in order to generate interest in that product, service, or group. Web sites can also be set up for the same purpose. In addition, some shills use sock puppetry, where one person poses as multiple users.

In some jurisdictions and circumstances, this type of activity is illegal. The plastic surgery company Lifestyle Lift ordered their employees to post fake positive reviews on websites. As a result, they were sued, and ordered to pay $300,000 in damages by the New York Attorney General's office.

Reputable organizations may prohibit their employees and other interested parties (contractors, agents, etc.) from participating in public forums or discussion groups in which a conflict of interest might arise, or will at least insist that their employees and agents refrain from participating in any way that might create a conflict of interest.

== Gambling ==
Both the illegal and legal gambling industries often use shills to make winning at games appear more likely than it actually is. For example, illegal three-card monte and shell-game peddlers are notorious employers of shills. These shills also often aid in cheating, disrupting the game if the mark is likely to win. In a legal casino, however, a shill is sometimes a gambler who plays using the casino's money in order to keep games (especially poker) going when there are not enough players. The title of one of Erle Stanley Gardner's mystery novels, Shills Can't Cash Chips, is derived from this type of shill. This is different from "proposition players" who are paid a salary by the casino for the same purpose, but bet with their own money.

== Marketing ==
In marketing, shills are often employed to assume the air of satisfied customers and give testimonials to the merits of a given product. This type of shilling is illegal in some jurisdictions, but almost impossible to detect. It may be considered a form of unjust enrichment or unfair competition, as in California's Business & Professions Code § 17200, which prohibits any "unfair or fraudulent business act or practice and unfair, deceptive, untrue or misleading advertising".

== Auctions ==
People who drive prices in favor of the seller or auctioneer with fake bids in an auction are called shills or potted plants and seek to provoke a bidding war among other participants. Often they are told by the seller precisely how high to bid, as the seller does not lose money if the item does not sell, paying only the auction fees. Shilling has a substantially higher rate of occurrence in online auctions, where any user with multiple accounts can bid on their own items. One detailed example of this has been documented in online auto auctions. The online auction site eBay forbids shilling; its rules do not allow friends or employees of a person selling an item to bid on the item, even though eBay has no means to detect if a bidder is related to a seller or is in fact the seller.

In his book Fake: Forgery, Lies, & eBay, Kenneth Walton describes how he and his accomplices placed shill bids on hundreds of eBay auctions over the course of a year. Walton and his associates were charged and convicted of fraud by federal authorities for their eBay shill bidding.

With the proliferation of live online auctions in recent years, shill bidding has become commonplace. Some websites allow shill bidding by participating auctioneers. These auctioneers are able to see bids placed in real time and can then place counter bids to increase the amount. One Proxibid auctioneers' website states, "At the request of the auction company, this auction permits bids to be placed by the seller or on the seller's behalf, even if such bids are placed solely for the purpose of increasing the bid."

== See also ==
- Aiding and abetting
- Astroturfing
- Compliance
- Confidence trick
- Corporate propaganda
- Cronyism
- False advertising
- False testimony
- Greenwashing
- Influence-for-hire
- Influencer marketing
- One weird trick
- Propaganda
- Psychological manipulation
- Pump and dump
- Pyramid scheme
- Sockpuppet
- Spin (public relations)
- You scratch my back
- Whitewash (censorship)
