= Simon Robinson =

Simon Robinson may refer to:

- Simon W. Robinson (1792–1868), American Freemason
- Simon Robinson (priest) (born 1967), British Anglican priest
- Simon Robinson (golfer) (born 1981), English professional golfer
