= Consistory (Freemasonry) =

Organization of Freemasonry dedicated to higher degrees

A Consistory is an establishment of Freemasonry specifically dedicated to granting the "higher degrees," to higher-ranking Freemasons, anywhere between the 19th and 32nd degrees. In some Masonic traditions, the 31st and 32nd degrees are instead awarded by a Grand Consistory. Consistories and Grand Consistories are different from most Masonic lodges, such as the Blue Lodge, in that those bodies usually award the degrees up to the 19th degree. In the 18th Century, a schism occurred in the Scottish Rite when Joseph Cerneau and Albert Pike created the movement known as Cerneauism, which established a Sovereign Grand Consistory.
