= Supreme Council, Scottish Rite (Southern Jurisdiction, USA) =

American Freemasonry organisation

The Supreme Council, Ancient and Accepted Scottish Rite, Southern Jurisdiction, USA is the first Supreme Council of Scottish Rite Freemasonry, founded in 1801. Its official full name is "The Supreme Council (Mother Council of the World) of the Inspectors General Knights Commander of the House of the Temple of Solomon of the Thirty-third Degree of the Ancient and Accepted Scottish Rite of Freemasonry of the Southern Jurisdiction of the United States of America." It is also commonly known as The Supreme Council, 33°, Southern Jurisdiction, or by some other varying degree of complete titulage. It is sometimes called the Mother Supreme Council of the World. It is the governing body of Scottish Rite Freemasonry in its jurisdiction, and is one of five Supreme Councils in the United States, along with the Northern Masonic Jurisdiction, the Supreme Council of Louisiana and two Prince Hall Affiliated Supreme Councils.

It claims that all other Supreme Councils and Subordinate Bodies of the Scottish Rite are derived from it, although some degrees in the Scottish Rite were practiced before the Southern Jurisdiction was organized. It oversees the Scottish Rite in 35 states. The other 15 states fall under the Northern Jurisdiction, which is an independent body.

The Scottish Rite is one of the appendant bodies of Freemasonry that a Master Mason may join for further exposure to the principles of Freemasonry. To join the Supreme Council, one must attain the 32° of the Scottish Rite. The 33° is an honorary degree which only some members obtain.

In the Southern Jurisdiction of the United States, the Supreme Council consists of no more than 33 members, and is presided over by a Sovereign Grand Commander. Other members of the Supreme Council are called Sovereign Grand Inspectors General (SGIG), and each is the head of the Rite in his respective Orient (or state). Other heads of the various Orients who are not members of the Supreme Council are called Deputies of the Supreme Council.

== History ==
The Supreme Council was founded in Charleston, South Carolina in May 1801 at Shepheard's Tavern at the corner of Broad and Church Streets. Previously, the tavern had been the location of the founding of Freemasonry in South Carolina in 1754. The Founding Fathers of the Scottish Rite who attended became known as "The Eleven Gentlemen of Charleston". They included:

- John Mitchell – Received a patent April 2, 1795, from Barend Moses Spitzer granting him authority as Deputy Inspector General to create a Lodge of Perfection and several Councils and Chapters wherever such Lodges or Chapters were needed. Born in Ireland in 1741, he came to America at an early age. He served as Deputy Quartermaster General in the Continental Army and was the first Grand Commander of the Supreme Council.
- Frederick Dalcho – A physician, he served in the Revolutionary Army and was stationed at Fort Johnson. He formed a partnership in 1801 with Dr. Isaac Auld, another of the original members. He was an outstanding orator and author. In 1807 he published the first edition of Ahiman Rezon. He became an editor of the Charleston Courier, was a lay reader and deacon in the Episcopal Church, and in 1818 was ordained as a priest.
- Alexandre Francois Auguste de Grasse, known as Comte de Grasse-Tilly. He was born in France as the eldest legitimate son of François Joseph Paul de Grasse, a French admiral known as a hero of the American Revolution for defeating the British fleet in the Battle of the Chesapeake. He inherited his father's title, and likely had the highest social ranking of the original eleven founders. He was the youngest of the members and was named to become the Grand Commander of the West Indian Islands. After Napoleon came to power, de Grasse returned to France and resumed his military career. He also extended Freemasonry, establishing the Supreme Council of France and councils in other European cities.
- Jean-Baptiste Marie de La Hogue – He was a native of Paris who had lived in Saint-Domingue until the revolution there; father-in-law of de Grasse, he was a founding member of La Candeur Lodge in Charleston.
- Thomas Bartholemew Bowen – Was the first Grand Master of Ceremonies of the new Supreme Council. He was a Major in the Continental Army and a printer by trade.
- Abraham Alexander – Was one of the first Sovereign Grand Inspectors General. He was born in London in 1743 and immigrated to Charleston in 1771. He was a prominent Sephardic Jew and had been described as "a Calligraphist of the first order"; he was elected as the first Grand Secretary General.
- Emanuel de la Motta – A Sovereign Grand Inspector General. Also, a Sephardic Jew, he was by trade a merchant and auctioneer. He was a member of Friendship Lodge and was reported to be devoted to the study of Jewish literature and Masonry.
- Isaac Auld – An eminent physician, associated in medical practice with Dr. Dalcho. He was a strong Congregationalist.
- Israel de Lieben – A Sovereign Grand Inspector General and the first Grand Treasurer General. He was born in Prague and emigrated to the United States at 21. He was known as "the liberal-headed Jew", who was "tolerant in his religious opinions" and was considered to be intelligent, enterprising, liberal and generous.
- Moses Clava Levy – Born in Kraków, Poland, he was a prosperous merchant, was generous and helpful to the unfortunate, and devoted to his adopted city and country.
- James Moultrie – the only native-born South Carolinian among the original members. He was a physician, and according to Albert Pike, "was one of the foremost Citizens of South Carolina".
- Isaac Da Costa, another Sephardic Jew, was one of the deputies commissioned to establish Morin's Rite of the Royal Secret in other countries; he formed constituent bodies of the Rite in South Carolina in 1783. These are considered to have become in 1801, The Supreme Council of the Ancient and Accepted Scottish Rite, Southern Jurisdiction.

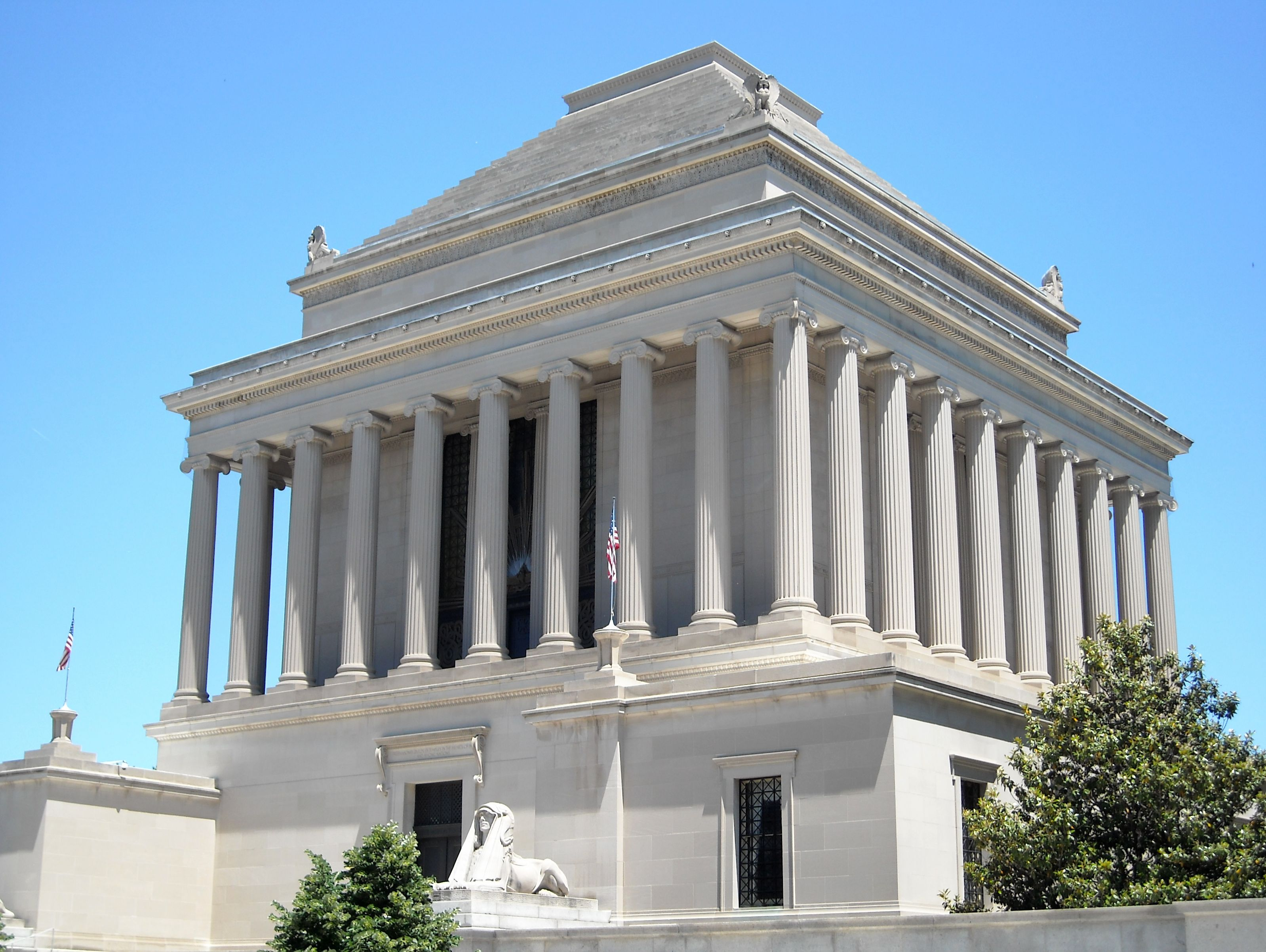
House of the Temple - Headquarters of the Southern Jurisdiction in Washington D.C. since 1915

In 1813, a member of the Supreme Council established in New York a Supreme Council for the Northern Jurisdiction of the United States of America. In 1823, the Supreme Council granted jurisdiction of the fifteen states east of the Mississippi River and north of the Ohio River to the Supreme Council for the Northern Jurisdiction.

After the Morgan Affair, membership numbers dwindled to the point that by 1844, there were only 4 members in the entire Supreme Council.

In 1870, "its residence was moved to Washington, D.C.," although " its see remains in Charleston."

In 1911 the Mother Supreme Council began construction of a new headquarters of the Supreme Council in the District of Columbia, called the House of the Temple. Finished in 1915, the House of the Temple remains their headquarters to this day. It is located at 1733 Sixteenth Street, NW. The House of the Temple also contains the remains of Albert Pike.

== Leadership ==
The head of the Southern Jurisdiction is titled the Sovereign Grand Commander. A total of 21 men have held this office since 1801. Albert Pike and John H. Cowel's tenures of 32 years were the longest. The list of Sovereign Grand Commanders is as follows:

Number	SGC	Years in Office	Number	SGC	Years in Office
1	John Mitchell	1801–1816	12	Thomas H. Caswell	1895–1900
2	Frederick Dalcho	1816–1822	13	James D. Richardson	1901–1914
3	Isaac Auld	1822–1826	14	George F. Moore	1914–1921
4	Moses Holbrook	1826–1844	15	John H. Cowles	1921–1953
5	Jacob De La Motta (acting)	1844–1845	16	Thomas J. Harkms	1952–1955
6	Alexander McDonald	1845–1846	17	Luther S. Smith	1955–1969
7	John H. Honour	1846–1858	18	Henry C. Clausen	1969–1985
8	Charles M. Furman (acting)	1858–1859	19	C. Fred Kleinknecht	1985–2003
9	Albert Pike	1859–1891	20	Ronald A. Seale	2003–2019
10	James C. Batchelor	1892–1893	21	James D. Cole	2019–present
11	Philip C. Tucker	1893–1895			

== Writing ==
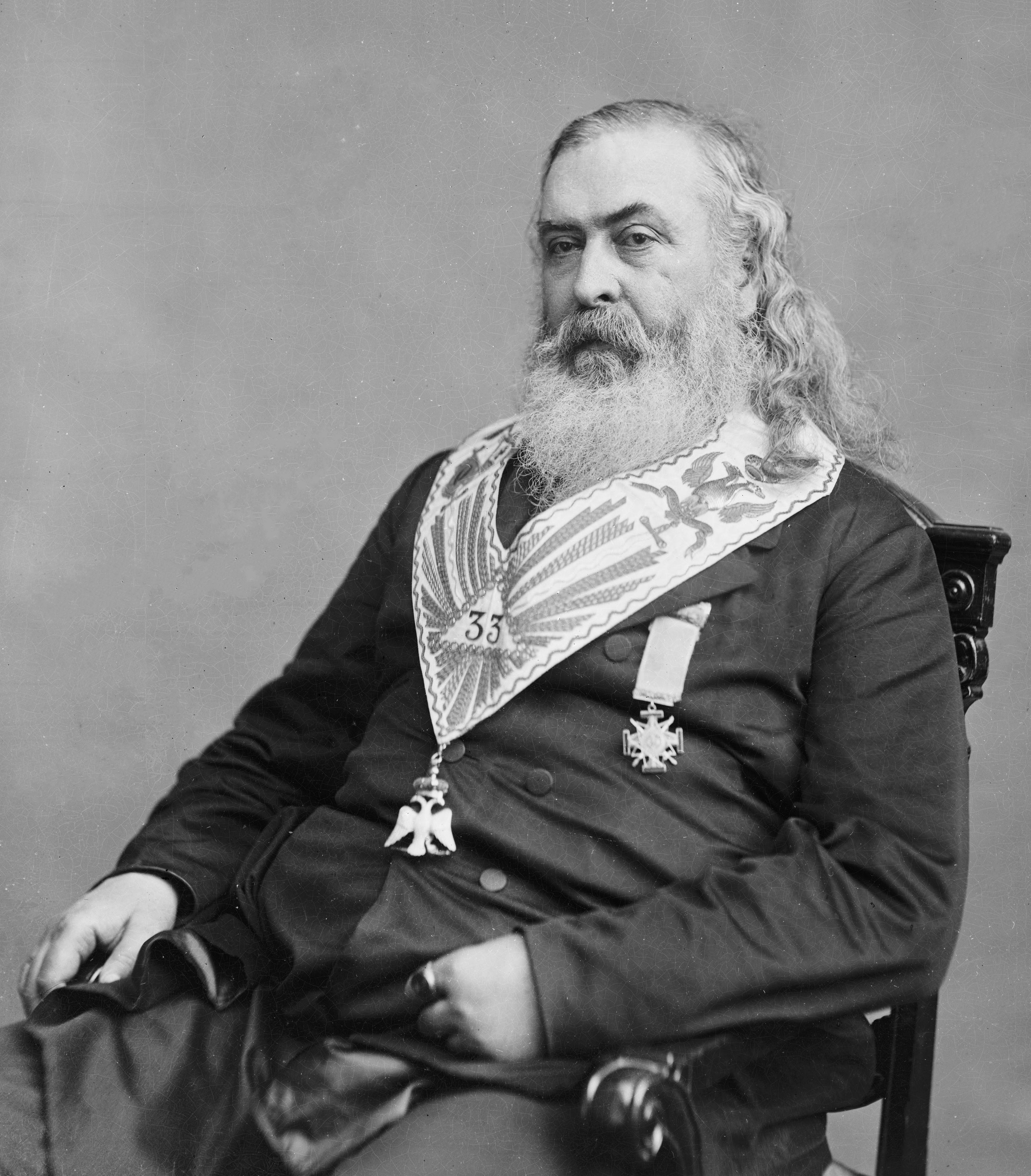
Albert Pike, SGC, 1859-1891.

An important philosophical document of the Southern Jurisdiction was Morals and Dogma of the Ancient and Accepted Scottish Rite of Freemasonry, written by Albert Pike in 1872. A copy of Morals and Dogma was given to every new member in the Southern Jurisdiction until 1974. The book given to new initiates then became Grand Commander Henry C. Clausen's Clausen's Commentaries On Morals and Dogma (1976), then Rex Hutchens' A Bridge to Light (1988). Following the adoption of the "Revised Standard Pike Ritual," Hutchens' book was revised in 2010 by Scottish Rite Grand Archivist and Grand Historian Arturo de Hoyos. Currently, de Hoyos' Scottish Rite Ritual Monitor and Guide (2007, rev. 2010) is now distributed to new members as is Albert Pike's Morals and Dogma: Annotated Edition (2011).

== Degree Structure ==
Before Albert Pike became a member of the Southern Jurisdiction, the degrees were in a rudimentary form, and often included only a brief history and legend of each degree, as well as other brief details which usually lacked a workable ritual for their conferral. In 1855, the Supreme Council appointed a committee to prepare and compile rituals for the 4th through the 32nd Degrees. That committee was composed of Albert G. Mackey, John H. Honour, William S. Rockwell, Claude P. Samory, and Albert Pike. Of these five committee members, Pike did all the work of the committee.

The degrees offered by the Southern Jurisdiction can be divided into four categories:

1. Lodge of Perfection - 4° through 14°
2. Chapter of Rose Croix - 15° through 18°
3. Council of Kadosh - 19° through 30°
4. Consistory - 31° and 32°

The inspiration for the various degrees are as follows:

- German Illuminism of the Tribunal of the Holy Vehme: 9th, 10th, 11th, and 21st Degrees
- Degrees of Hebrew and Biblical Origin: 4th, 5th, 6th, 7th, 8th, 12th, 13th, 14th, 15th, 16th, and 17th Degrees
- Temple Degrees: 19th, 20th, 23rd, 24th, 25th, 26th, 27th, and 29th Degrees
- Alchemical and Rosicrucian Degrees: 22nd and 28th Degrees

As of 2017, the topics of the degrees are as follows:

Degree	Name	Setting and/or Topic	Degree	Name	Setting and/or Topic
4°	Secret Master	Near the Holiest of Holies in Solomon's Temple	19°	Grand Pontiff	Albert Pike created ritual following a general plot of the hero's journey
5°	Perfect Master	Hiram Abiff's Funeral	20°	Master of the Symbolic Lodge	Geometry and Virtues; Famous lawgivers including Hammurabi, Socrates and Confucius
6°	Intimate Secretary	Non-biblical story of debts owed by Solomon to Hiram of Tyre	21°	Noachite, or Prussian Knight	Imperial Free City of Dortmund in the 1190s
7°	Provost and Judge	Phoenicians and Jews building the Temple	22°	Knight of the Royal Ax, or Prince of Libanus	Prussian Knights
8°	Intendant of the Building	Selection to succeed Hiram Abiff	23°	Chief of the Tabernacle	Chapter 16 of the Book of Numbers
9°	Elu of the Nine	Vengeance for Hiram Abiff's murder	24°	Prince of the Tabernacle	Four Elements, Osiris, Mithra
10°	Elu of the Fifteen	Execution of the murderers of Hiram Abiff	25°	Knight of the Brazen Serpent	Sufism
11°	Elu of the Twelve	Execution of the murderers of Hiram Abiff	26°	Prince of Mercy, or Scottish Trinitarian	Comparative Religions
12°	Master Architect	Adoniram, successor to Hiram Abiff	27°	Knight of the Sun, or Prince Adept	Knighthood; Middle Ages
13°	Royal Arch of Solomon	Vault of Enoch	28°	Knight Commander of the Temple	El
14°	Perfect Elu	Initiation Ceremony	29°	Scottish Knight of Saint Andrew	Robert the Bruce
15°	Knight of the East, or Knight of the Sword, or Knight of the Eagle	Ruins of Solomon's Temple and the throne room of Cyrus the Great during the Babylonian Captivity	30°	Knight Kadosh, or Knight of the White and Black Eagle	Philip the Fair; Pope Clement V; Jacques De Molay; Seven Liberal Arts; Kabala
16°	Prince of Jerusalem	Darius' support for rebuilding the Temple	31°	Inspector Inquisitor	Egyptian Book of the Dead
17°	Knight of the East and West	Execution of John the Baptist; Book of Revelation	32°	Master of the Royal Secret	Esotericism; Pythagoreans; Zarathustrans; Magi; Kabbalists
18°	Knight Rose Croix	Chamber of Darkness; Chamber of Hell; Chamber of the Mystic Rose	33°	Inspector General	Tribe of Levi

== Scottish Rite Honors ==
In the Southern Jurisdiction, a member who has been a 32° Scottish Rite Mason for 46 months or more is eligible to be elected to be invested with the "rank and decoration" of Knight Commander of the Court of Honour (K∴C∴C∴H∴) This Honor was established by Albert Pike in 1878 for recognition of outstanding service. These members are easily recognized by their red caps with a passion cross embroidered on them. This ceremony is not a degree. It is a public Investiture. The new Sir Knight is invested with the rank, distinction, and decoration of Knight Commander within the Court of Honour. This investiture is only done at the Orient level.

Originally, the 33° was only conferred on those who would be active members of the Supreme Council. Now, after 46 months of serving as a K∴C∴C∴H∴ a Scottish Rite Mason is then eligible to be elected to be coroneted a 33° Inspector General (Honorary), upon approval of the Supreme Council and Sovereign Grand Commander. These members are called Inspectors General Honorary (I∴G∴H∴). The member may elect to go to the Biennial Meeting of Scottish Rite in Washington D.C. for conferral of the degree or he may choose to receive it in his Orient at a specific Scottish Rite Valley where it is regularly conferred. These members are recognized by their white caps with Patriarchal/Cross Lorraine embroidery.

The highest award achievable in the Scottish Rite of Freemasonry is the Grand Cross of the Court of Honour. This honor is invested with members who have demonstrated exemplary service to Freemasonry in general or humanity at large. This honor was established by Albert Pike at the same time as the Knight Commander of the Court of Honor. These members are recognizable with their white hats with blue band and a Teutonic Cross embroidery.

== Philanthropy ==
The Supreme Council in 1928 made a gift of $1 million to the George Washington University in D.C., to fund the creation of what is today the School of Business.

Since the early 1950s, the Supreme Council has sponsored the RiteCare Scottish Rite Childhood Language Program "to help children with speech and language disorders."

In addition, Scottish Rite for Children, a pediatric hospital located in Dallas, Texas, is located within the jurisdiction of the Southern Jurisdiction and there are many Scottish Rite Masons on the Board of Directors. Likewise Children's Healthcare of Atlanta at Scottish Rite had its roots as a hospital owned and operated by the Scottish Rite.

== See also ==
- Scottish Rite
- Supreme Council, Northern Jurisdiction
- Supreme Council of Louisiana
