= Sampson Simson =

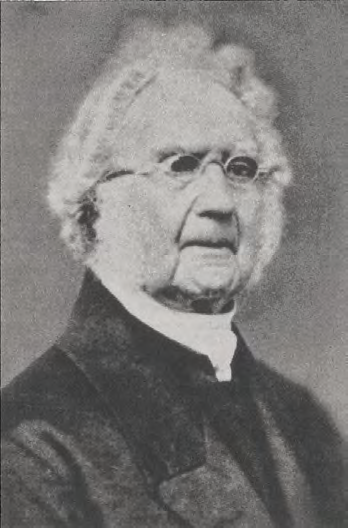
1825-1832 Simson Sampson 2

Sampson Simson (1780 - 7 January 1857) was an Orthodox Jewish American philanthropist most remembered as "the father of Mount Sinai Hospital."

== Biography ==
Simson was born in Danbury, Connecticut to Solomon Simson. Some sources claim that his grandfather emigrated from Germany while others claim that both his father and his paternal grandfather were native New Yorkers. The Simson family had moved to Danbury during the American Revolution under the leadership of Gershom Seixas, who felt that Danbury would be a better place to live than Tory-controlled New York City. Due to the occupation, Congregation Shearith Israel was temporarily closed.

Simson studied law under Aaron Burr, attended Columbia College, Columbia University in New York City, and graduated in 1800 with a degree in law and was admitted to the bar in 1802, becoming one of the first Jewish lawyers in New York City. He was the first Jewish graduate of Columbia.

After a few years practice, however, Simson abandoned his law career and retired to his Yonkers farm to devote himself to charitable work. This was on account of his "distaste for an active public life" as well as an accident that left him disabled for a number of months. Other sources describe the "accident" as a "noctournal assault."

He was described as a very pious man with a "New England conscience", a combination of a "public-spirited citizen" and "conformist Jew". Simson was a member of Congregation Shearith Israel and received great pleasure from his charitable contributions, be they to a Catholic church, a Protestant church or a synagogue. He was also said to be a great admirer of President Andrew Jackson.

From 1825 until 1832, Simson served as the 2nd Sovereign Grand Commander of the Northern Masonic Jurisdiction of the Scottish Rite of Freemasonry succeeding Daniel D. Tompkins in this position.

In 1852, Simson, along with eight other men representing various Hebrew charitable organizations, came together to establish the Jews' Hospital in New York, the institution that eventually in 1866 became Mount Sinai Hospital. Its location, West 28th Street between 7th and 8th Avenues in New York City, was on land donated by Simson; he served the first president of its board of directors and personally assumed many of the young hospital's financial burdens. The Jews' Hospital opened two years before his death.

That same year, Simson joined Samuel Myer Isaacs and Adolphus Simeon Solomons to help found the Beth Hamedrash Hagodol.

== Personal life ==
Simson never married but was close to his sister, Mrs. Rebecca Isaacks as well as her two children Moses and Jochebed (or Jessie).

== Legacy ==
Simson's estate bequeathed large sums of money to Jewish and general institutions, including $50,000 that, after the death of his nephew Moses, should be paid "to any responsible corporation in this city whose permanent fund is established by its charter for the purpose of ameliorating the condition of the Jews in Jerusalem, Palestine." If no such society existed at the time, the money would instead go to the heirs of his niece and nephew.

In 1888, the New York State Supreme Court decided that the sum, plus 30 years' interest, was to be paid to the North American Relief Society for Indigent Jews in Jerusalem. However, the son of the Simon's niece Jochebed appealed the ruling, and the New York Court of Appeals overturned it, the difference between "charitable" and "benevolent" purposes. The North American Relief Society for Indigent Jews in Jerusalem was chartered to contribute to the "relief of the indigent Jews, in Jerusalem" while Simson's will called for the money to be donated to an organization promoting "education, arts and sciences, and by learning them mechanical and agricultural vocations." As a result, the full amount was awarded to the heir.

Mount Sinai Hospital was recently ranked as one of the best hospitals in the United States by U.S. News & World Report.

== See also ==
- List of first minority male lawyers and judges in New York
