= List of treaties of the Confederate States of America =

This is a list of treaties of the Confederate States of America.

The Confederate States of America (CSA) was not officially recognized as a sovereign state by any foreign nation. Thus, the CSA did not enter into any bilateral or multilateral treaties with other states. It was, however, recognized as a belligerent by the United Kingdom, Spain, and Brazil.

In 1861, the CSA authorized Albert Pike—the CSA "Commissioner to all the Indian Tribes West of Arkansas and South of Kansas"—to negotiate and conclude treaties with native Indian tribes resident in Indian Territory. Pike concluded nine treaties with Indian tribes between July and October 1861. Each of the nine treaties were ratified by the CSA Congress prior to the end of the year.

Date treaty concluded	Treaty name	Other parties to treaty	Date of ratification by CSA Congress	Subject matter
10 July 1861	Treaty of Friendship and Alliance with the Creek Nation of Indians	Muscogee (Creek) Nation		Relations with Indian tribes in Indian Territory
12 July 1861	Treaty of Friendship and Alliance with Chocktaw and Chickasaw Nations of Indians	Choctaw; Chickasaw Nation	20 December 1861	Relations with Indian tribes in Indian Territory
1 August 1861	Treaty of Friendship and Alliance with the Seminole Nation of Red Men	Seminole	20 December 1861	Relations with Indian tribes in Indian Territory
12 August 1861	Treaty with the Pen-e-tegh-ca band of the Ne-um or Comanches, and the tribes and bands of Wich-i-tas, Cado-Ha-da-chos, Huecos, Ta-hua-ca-ros, A-na-dagh-cos, Ton-ca-wes, Ai-o-nais, Ki-chais, Shawnees and Delawares	Comanche; Wichita; Caddo; Waco; Tonkawa; Kichai; Shawnee; Delaware	21 December 1861	Relations with Indian tribes in Indian Territory
12 August 1861	Treaty with the Ne-co-ni, Ta-ne-i we, Co-cho-tin-ca and Ya-pa-rih-ca bands of the Ne-um or Comanches of the Prairies and Staked Plain	Comanche	21 December 1861	Relations with Indian tribes in Indian Territory
2 October 1861	Treaty with the Great Osage Tribe of Indians	Osage	20 December 1861	Relations with Indian tribes in Indian Territory
4 October 1861	Treaty with the Seneca tribe of Indians, formerly known as the Senecas of Sandusky, and the Shawnees of the Tribe or Confederacy of Senecas and Shawnees formerly known as the Senecas and Shawnees of Lewistown, or the Mixed Bands of Senecas and Shawnees, each Tribe for itself	Seneca; Shawnee	21 December 1861	Relations with Indian tribes in Indian Territory
4 October 1861	Treaty with the Quapaw Tribe of Indians	Quapaw	21 December 1861	Relations with Indian tribes in Indian Territory
7 October 1861	Treaty of Friendship and Alliance with the Cherokee Nation of Indians	Cherokee (led by John Ross)	11 December 1861	Relations with Indian tribes in Indian Territory
