= Supreme Council, Scottish Rite, Northern Jurisdiction, USA =

American Freemasonry organisation

The Supreme Council, Scottish Rite, Northern Masonic Jurisdiction oversees the Scottish Rite of Freemasonry in fifteen states: Connecticut, Delaware, Illinois, Indiana, Maine, Massachusetts, Michigan, New Jersey, New Hampshire, New York, Ohio, Pennsylvania, Rhode Island, Wisconsin and Vermont. This territory has existed since 1827 when the NMJ gained jurisdiction "over the then 14 states situated east of the Mississippi and north of the Mason-Dixon Line. Wisconsin was not yet a state, but part of Michigan."

Formed in 1813, the Northern Masonic Jurisdiction is divided into "Valleys." Each Valley has up to four subordinate bodies, and each body confers a set of degrees. The four subordinate bodies are the Lodge of Perfection, which confers degrees 4 through 14, the Council of Princes of Jerusalem, which confers degrees 15 and 16, the Chapter of Rose Croix which confers degrees 17 and 18, and the consistory which confers degrees from 19 to 32.

== History ==
=== Beginnings ===
Most of the thirty-three degrees of the Scottish Rite existed in parts of previous degree systems. In 1767, the Ineffable Lodge of Perfection had been chartered in Albany, NY, and awarded up to the 25th degree. Similar bodies were formed in Philadelphia and Charleston awarding degrees up to the 25th, but all had died out by 1800.

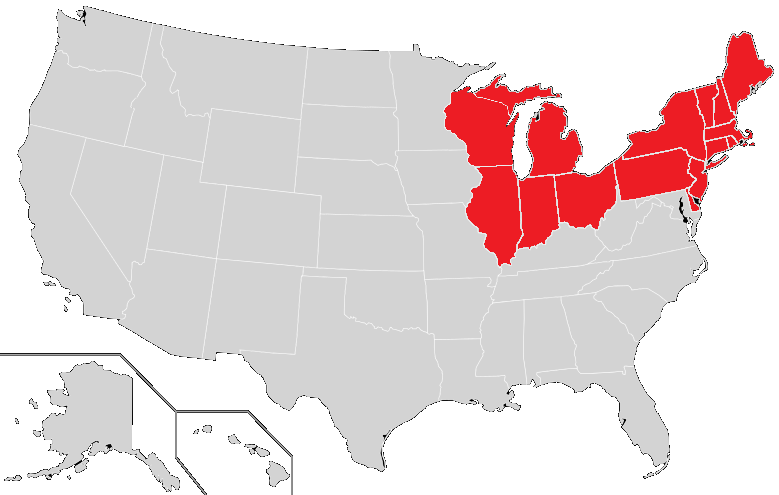
US states in the Northern Masonic Jurisdiction

The Scottish Rite in the United States, and the awarding of degrees up to the 33rd, formally came into being with the creation of the Mother Supreme Council at Charleston, South Carolina, in May 1801.

In 1806, a member of the Scottish Rite, Southern Jurisdiction named Antoine Bideaud traveled to New York City and conferred the 30, 31, and 32 degrees upon John Joseph Gourgas and four other Frenchmen for $46 each. This was done under the table by Bideaud to make a little extra money.

In early 1813, Emmanuel De La La Motta, Grand Treasurer of the Scottish Rite, Southern Jurisdiction, was in New York for health reasons and learned of these Scottish Rite Masons. Over the course of a few months, their status was regularized within the Scottish Rite.

The founding six members included the men who would become the first three Sovereign Grand Commanders, Daniel D. Tompkins, Sampson Simson, and John Joseph Gourgas, as well as three others, John Gabriel Tardy, Richard Riker and Moses Levy Maduro Peixotto.

=== Supreme Council Foundation ===
On May 1, 1813, an officer from the Supreme Council at Charleston initiated several New York Masons into the Thirty-third Degree and organized a Supreme Council for the "Northern Masonic District and Jurisdiction". On May 21, 1814, this Supreme Council reopened and proceeded to "nominate, elect, appoint, install and proclaim in due, legal and ample form" the elected officers "as forming the second Grand and Supreme Council...". Finally, the charter of this organization (written January 7, 1815) added, "We think the Ratification ought to be dated 21st day May 5815."

The Northern Masonic Jurisdiction had rivals for control of the Scottish Rite in the North, including from the Cerneau Supreme Council. While their dispute was multifaceted, some scholars argue that a chief difference was that the early version of the Northern Masonic Jurisdiction was inclusive of Jewish members, while the Cerneau Supreme Council excluded them.

After the Morgan Affair, the Northern Masonic Jurisdiction was inactive from 1832 to 1843, with "Gourgas and Yates were effectively a Supreme Council of two people, preserving the organization's records and corresponding with one another about the plight of American Freemasonry." During this period, a number of men gave up their memberships as Freemasons in the face of wider anti-Masonic ostracism. By 1847, membership consisted of only 9 members.

=== Schism of 1860 ===
In 1860, at a meeting of the Supreme Council, the sitting Sovereign Grand Commander, Edward Asa Raymond, "refused to act on a motion, blocked a motion to adjourn, and then declared the Council closed. The next day, immediately after the opening and the reading of the minutes, he closed the Council 'sine die,' or indefinitely, and walked out." Killian Henry Van Rensselaer was elected as Lieutenant Grand Commander in Raymond's absence, who then served as acting Grand Commander.

Raymond would leave the Supreme Council completely, and along with Grand Treasurer Simon W. Robinson, formed their own rival Supreme Council, named after Raymond, which would soon merge with the Hays Cerneau Council. In early 1862, expelled his successor, Killian Henry Van Rensselaer from this new Scottish Rite order.

A few months later, in May 1862, Raymond was accused of "a spirit of insubordination" and attempting to continue to function as Sovereign Grand Commander despite having been removed from office, and expelled from the original Northern Masonic Jurisdiction.

The Schism of 1860, which began as an internal leadership dispute ultimately led to two competing Supreme Councils operated in the Northeast until a reconciliation in 1867.

Officially, the Supreme Council, 33°, N.M.J. dates itself from May 15, 1867, as this was the date of the "Union of 1867", when the Northern Masonic Jurisdiction merged with the competing Hays-Raymond Cerneau Supreme Council in New York, thus forming the current Ancient and Accepted Scottish Rite, Northern Masonic Jurisdiction of the United States.

=== 20th century ===
Originally located in New York, the headquarters of the NMJ was in downtown Boston for much of the late 19th and 20th century. From 1927 to 1968, the offices were located in the Statler Hotel, moving to Lexington, Massachusetts in 1968. In 1975, the Supreme Council founded the Museum of Our National Heritage, now the Scottish Rite Masonic Museum & Library, in Lexington, Massachusetts.

=== 21st century ===
In 2013, the headquarters building was sold to the town of Lexington, with the offices of the Sovereign Grand Commander moving into the Scottish Rite Masonic Museum & Library located next door.

In December 2023, Past Sovereign Grand Commander, David Glattly criticized the Supreme Council over internal bickering and financial mismanagement. In February 2024, Glattly was expelled from the order, initially without explanation. In March 2024, the current Sovereign Grand Commander, Walter F. Wheeler claimed Glattly's expulsion was due to ballot fraud, inappropriate employment practices, lack of budgetary control, expense control and excessive spending, failures of corporate governance and a toxic workplace environment under Glattly's stewardship.

=== Philanthropy ===
Masonic Learning Centers for Children, Inc. which provides tutoring for children with dyslexia in the Northern Masonic Jurisdiction, is the primary charity of the Northern Masonic Jurisdiction. The Scottish Rite Masonic Museum & Library is also a charity.

== Leadership ==
In the Northern Masonic Jurisdiction, the Supreme Council consists of no more than 66 members. All members of the Supreme Council are designated Sovereign Grand Inspectors General. In addition, the head of the Rite in each Valley of the Northern Masonic Jurisdiction is called a "Deputy of the Supreme Council."

The Northern Masonic Jurisdiction meets yearly, in recent years alternating between the headquarters in Lexington, Massachusetts in even years and a large city in the Northern Masonic Jurisdiction in odd years. However, in 2023 the annual meeting was in Lexington, Kentucky, which is located in the Southern Jurisdiction.

=== Soverign Grand Commander ===
The head of the NMJ is the Sovereign Grand Commander. The current Sovereign Grand Commander is Walter F. Wheeler, who was installed to the post in August 2023 at the annual meeting in Louisville, Kentucky.

Henry Lynde Palmer's tenure of 30 years was the longest, and Giles Fonda Yates, who served for only 10 days, was the shortest. Two Sovereign Grand Commanders of the Northern Masonic Jurisdictions have been expelled by the Supreme Council after their terms had ended, namely Edward Asa Raymond in 1862 and David Alan Glattly in 2024.

Klliian Henry Van Rensselaer, then Soverign Grand Commander, was also expelled by his predecessor, Edward Asa Raymond in 1862, who had set up his own rival Raymond Supreme Council.

The list of Sovereign Grand Commanders is as follows:

Number	SGC	Years in office	Number	SGC	Years in office
1	Daniel Decius Tompkins	1813–1825	13	Melvin Maynard Johnson	1933–1953
2	Sampson Simson	1825–1832	14	George Edward Bushnell	1953–1965
3	John James Joseph Gourgas	1832–1851	15	George Adelbert Newbury	1965–1975
4	Giles Fonda Yates	1851	16	Stanley Fielding Maxwell	1975–1985
5	Edward Asa Raymond	1851–1860	17	Francis George Paul	1985–1993
6	Killian Henry Van Rensselaer	1860–1861 (acting); 1862–1867	18	Robert Odel Ralston	1993–2003
7	Josiah Hayden Drummond	1867–1879	19	Walter Ernest Webber	2003–2006
8	Henry Lynde Palmer	1879–1909	20	John William McNaughton	2006–2017
9	Samuel Crocker Lawrence	1909–1910	21	David Alan Glattly	2017–2021
10	Barton Smith	1910–1921	22	Peter John Samiec	2021–2023
11	Leon Martin Abbott	1921–1932	23	Walter F. Wheeler	2023–present
12	Frederic Beckwith Stevens	1932–1933 (acting)			

== Membership ==
Total membership has fluctuated over the years, reaching a peak in the late 1960s:

Year	Total membership	Year	Total membership
1813	6	1959	489,198
1845	2	1969	510,583
1847	9	1979	502,114
1879	7,366	1989	412,612
1909	61,252	1999	296,687
1929	300,839	2009	171,230
1939	209,385	2019	99,273
1949	377,845		

== Degree structure ==
Members of the Northern Masonic Jurisdiction are required to have achieved the third degree or Master Mason degree in their local lodges before they can apply to join the Scottish Rite. The Northern Masonic Jurisdiction offers 29 additional degrees, with a final 33rd degree conferred as an honor for service to the fraternity and society. However, taking these additional degrees does not give one higher "rank" in Masonry. While the higher numbering might imply a hierarchy, the additional degrees are considered "appendant degrees". They represent a lateral movement in Masonic education rather than an upward movement, and are degrees of instruction rather than rank.

In 2004, the Northern Masonic Jurisdiction rewrote and reorganized its degrees and further changes occurred in 2006. As of 2023, the degrees offered by the Northern Masonic Jurisdiction can be divided into four categories:

1. Lodge of Perfection (4°–14°); set in the Old Testament
2. Council of Princes of Jerusalem (15° and 16°); set during and after the Babylonian Captivity
3. Chapter of Rose Croix (17° and 18°); set before and during the time of Jesus
4. Consistory (19°–32°); set from the Middle Ages to 1943

Some of the degrees are historical, while others can be considered historical fiction. As of 2026, the topics of the degrees are as follows:

Degree	Name	Setting and/or Topic	Degree	Name	Setting and/or Topic
4°	Builder/Master Traveller	Present Day/Hiram Abiff	19°	Brothers of the Trail	Oregon Trail (1849)
5°	Perfect Master/Perfect Traveller	Nadab and Abihu	20°	Master ad Vitam	George Washington and Benedict Arnold (1784)
6°	Master of the Brazen Serpent	Neushtan	21°	Patriarch Noachite	Imperial Free City of Dortmund (1190s)
7°	Provost and Judge	Building of Solomon's Temple	22°	Prince of Libanus	Lumberjacks in the Pacific Northwest (Late 1800s or early 1900s)
8°	Intendant of the Building	Adonijah	23°	Knight of Valor	Four Chaplains (1943)
9°	Master of the Temple	Dedication of Solomon's Temple	24°	Brother of Tolerance/Brother of the Forest	Native Americans and Colonial America (late 1700s)
10°	Master Elect	Solomon and his wives	25°	Master of Achievement	Benjamin Franklin (1788)
11°	Sublime Master Elected	Tax Collectors during the Reign of Solomon	26°	Friend and Brother Eternal	Friend to Friend Masonic Memorial (1863)
12°	Master of Mercy	Joseph	27°	Knight of Jerusalem	Pope Honorius III and Emperor Frederick II (1223)
13°	Master of the Ninth Arch	Vault of Enoch	28°	Knight of the Sun	Elias Ashmole (1650)
14°	Grand Elect Mason	Initiation Ceremony	29°	Knight of Saint Andrew	Battle of Nicopolis (1396)
15°	Knight of the East	Zerubbabel during the Babylonian Captivity	30°	Grand Inspector	A Courtroom; Reign of Edward II (1307–1327)
16°	Prince of Jerusalem	Building of the Second Temple	31°	My Brother's Keeper	Green Dragon Tavern (1770)
17°	Knight of the East and West	Herod's reign, main gate of the Second Temple	32°	Sublime Prince of the Royal Secret	Knighthood; Middle Ages
18°	Knight of the Rose Croix de Heredom	Old Testament; Crucifixion; Resurrection	33°	Sovereign Grand Inspector General	Tribe of Levi

=== 33rd degree ===
In the Northern Masonic Jurisdiction, there is a 46-month requirement for eligibility to receive the 33rd degree, and while there is both a Meritorious Service Award and a Distinguished Service Award, they are not required as intermediate steps towards the 33°. A recipient of the 33rd Degree is an honorary member of the Supreme Council and is therefore called an "Inspector General Honorary." However, those who are appointed Deputies of the Supreme Council that are later elected to membership on the Supreme Council are then designated "Sovereign Grand Inspectors General."

== See also ==
- Scottish Rite
- Supreme Council, Southern Jurisdiction
- Supreme Council of Louisiana
