= Emily Rebecca Page =

American poet (1834–1862)

- Born: May 6, 1834; Bradford Village, Vermont, U.S.
- Died: February 14, 1862 (aged 27); Chelsea, Massachusetts, U.S.
- Resting place: Woodlawn Cemetery, Everett, Massachusetts
- Occupations: poet, editor
- Writing career
- Language: English
- Notable work: "The Old Canoe"

Emily Rebecca Page (May 5, 1834 - February 14, 1862) was an American poet and editor. She began contributing poems to the Portland, Maine Transcript in 1846. She wrote prose and poetry for the Carpet-Bag, Ladies' Repository, and the Rose-Bud. For several years, she was a contributor to the publications of Maturin Murray Ballou. Some of her poetry, including "The Old Canoe", was occasionally attributed to other authors. That and "Haunted" were printed in Poets and Poetry of Vermont (Boston, 1860). "The Old Bridge," "Mabel," "My Angels," and "Watching" were also well known. Lily of the Valley was issued in book form (1859).

== Early life and education ==
Emily Rebecca Page was born in Bradford Village, Vermont, May 5, 1834. Her father, Casper Page, by occupation a shoemaker, was formerly of Greensboro, Vermont. Her mother, Emily A. (Alger) Page, was daughter, by a former marriage, of Mrs. Eugene Baker, and died when this, her infant daughter and only child, was only two weeks of age. The dying young mother gave her child to Mrs. Baker, her own mother, to raise as her own. Page's father died of tuberculosis before Page was two years old.

Eugene Baker, the step-grandfather, was the toll-gatherer at Piermont Bridge, across Connecticut River. His toll house, in which Page was brought up, was at the west end of the bridge. Her commemoration of the bridge in her poem, "The Old Bridge", was natural. Page wrote verses while yet a child, and when about twelve years of age, some of her poetic effusions found their way into the local paper, much to her regret in later years.

Early teachers included her aunt, Maria R. Baker, and Miss Mary Belcher. When young, Page attended a private school in Piermont, New Hampshire. Later, she attended the academy in Bradford and, for a term or two, that at St. Johnsbury, Vermont. The last time she appeared in the schoolroom was at the close of the academic year. She was so frail that she was obliged to lean upon another student while she read her essay out loud.

== Career ==
Page began contributing poems to the Portland Transcript in 1846. She wrote both prose and poetry for the Carpet-Bag, Ladies' Repository, and an annual called the Rose-Bud (Boston, 1854–55), as well as for Benjamin Penhallow Shillaber's publication. For several years, she was a constant contributor to Ballou's publications and an assistant in the editorial work.

Several of Page's poems appeared in the Gazetteer, and also in the volume of Vermont Poets. Abby Maria Hemenway, editor of the Vermont Historical Gazetteer, said that Page had the honor, while living, of being one of the only two in Vermont admitted by Charles Anderson Dana into his compilation of the Household Poets of the World. Her work was included in Lily of the Valley (Boston, 1859). "The Old Canoe" and some of her other poems were often mistakenly attributed to various distinguished authors. The first and revised edition of Poets and Poetry of Vermont (Boston, 1860), edited by Hemenway contains several of Page's poems, including "The Old Canoe" and "Haunted". "The Old Bridge," "Mabel," "My Angels," and "Watching" were also well known.

After the death of the step-grandfather, Page moved to Chelsea, Massachusetts, near Boston, with her grandmother Baker and Aunt Maria. Here, she was connected with editorial work at one of the Boston weekly papers, and as poetical editor of Frederick Gleason's various publications.

== Death ==
Always frail and delicate, she died at Chelsea, Massachusetts, on February 14, 1862, age 27. Her grave is in Woodlawn Cemetery, in Everett, Massachusetts, her epitaph being her own words, "Through the darkness into light."

== Selected works ==
=== Poetry collection ===
- The Lily of the Valley (Boston, 1859) (text)
