= Josiah Hayden Drummond =

American politician (1827–1902)

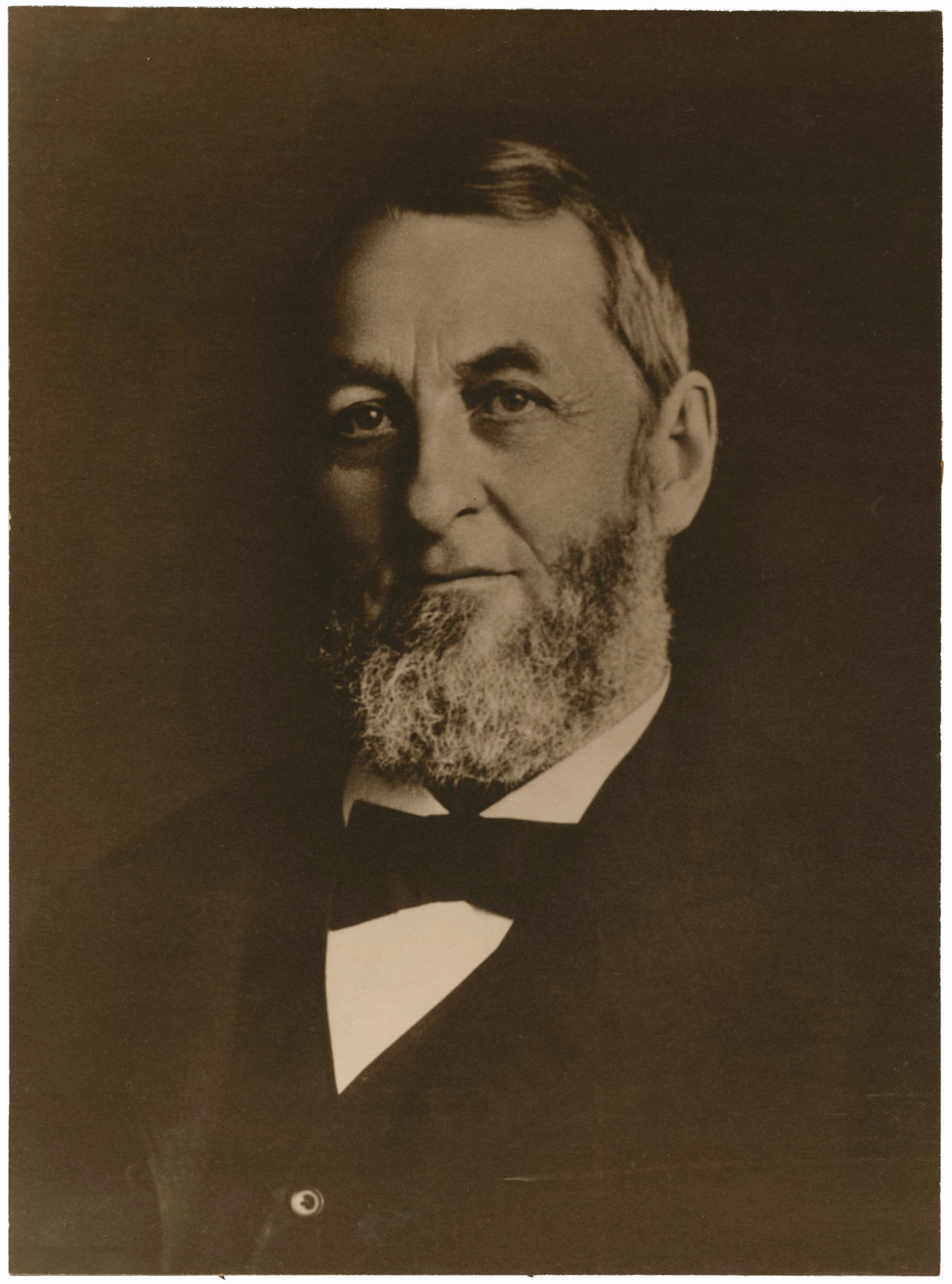

16th Attorney General of Maine
- In office 1860–1863
- Governor: Israel Washburn, Jr.
- Preceded by: G.W. Ingersoll
- Succeeded by: John A. Peter

Personal details
- Born: August 20, 1827
- Died: October 25, 1902 (aged 75)
- Spouse: Elzada Rollins (Bean) Drummond
- Children: 4
- Education: Colby College

Josiah Hayden Drummond (August 30, 1827 – October 25, 1902) was an American attorney and politician. He served as Maine Attorney General from 1860 to 1863.

== Personal ==
J.H. Drummond was born to Clark and Cynthia (Blackwell) Drummond in Winslow, Maine. He attended Vassalboro Academy and graduated from Colby College in 1846. He married Elzada Rollins (Bean) on December 10, 1850, and had three daughters and one son.

== Career ==
He entered politics as a Democrat, but when the Republican Party was formed he joined it. He was a Maine State Representative from Waterville from 1857 to 1858, and Speaker of the Maine House of Representatives in 1858. He was a State Senator in 1859, and resigned his seat to accept the position of Maine Attorney General, which he held from 1860 to 1863. During that period, he wrote a letter to the Governor of Maine, Israel Washburn, Jr., urging him not to appoint Joshua Chamberlain as colonel of the 20th Maine.

He was again a Maine State Congressman and Speaker of the House in 1868.

He held numerous positions as a Freemason. He was Grand Master of the Grand Lodge of Maine from 1860 to 1862. As Past Grandmaster in 1877, he published the Maine Masonic Text Book, which is still used by the Grand Lodge of Maine today.

In the Scottish Rite, Northern Masonic Jurisdiction, he was Lieutenant Grand Commander from 1862 to 1863 and Sovereign Grand Commander from 1867 to 1878, the first SGC after the Union of 1867. During his tenure the National Heritage Museum was founded.

He was also General Grand Master of the General Grand Council of Royal and Select Masters from 1880 to 1882 and the Provincial Grand Master of the Royal Order of Scotland from 1891 to 1902.

With his son he formed Drummond & Drummond law firm in 1881 which continues to the present day in downtown Portland, Maine, as one of the oldest firms in the state.

He was the Chairman of the Board of Trustees at Colby College from 1890 to 1902.

He died unexpectedly in 1902. He is buried at Evergreen Cemetery in Portland.

== Published works ==
- Drummond, Josiah Hayden (1902). The two James Rogers: James Rogers of Londonderry and James Rogers of Dunbarton: a genealogical research. OCLC 9860887.
- Drummond, Josiah Hayden (1903). Joshua Bean, of Exeter, Brentwood and Gilmanton, N. H., and some of his descendants. OCLC 3318839.
- Drummond, Josiah Hayden (1903). The John Rogers families in Plymouth and vicinity. OCLC 9860917.
- Drummond (P.G.M., Josiah Hayden (1882). Masonic historical and bibliographical memoranda. Brookeville, KY: Masonic Collectors' Association. p. 190 – via archive.org.

Legal offices
Preceded by G.W. Ingersoll	Maine Attorney General; 1860	Succeeded by John A. Peters
