= Albert Pike Highway =

Auto trail in the United States

Route information
- Length: 900 mi (1,400 km)

Major junctions
- West end: Colorado Springs, Colorado
- East end: Hot Springs, Arkansas

Location
- Country: United States
- States: Colorado, Kansas, Oklahoma, Arkansas

Highway system
- Auto trails

Albert Pike Highway was a route of over 900 miles (1,400 km) in length running from Hot Springs, Arkansas, to Colorado Springs, Colorado, crossing the Ozark Mountains and passing through Fort Smith, Muskogee, Tulsa, Dodge City, La Junta and Pueblo. It was named after Albert Pike.
