= House of the Temple =

The House of the Temple
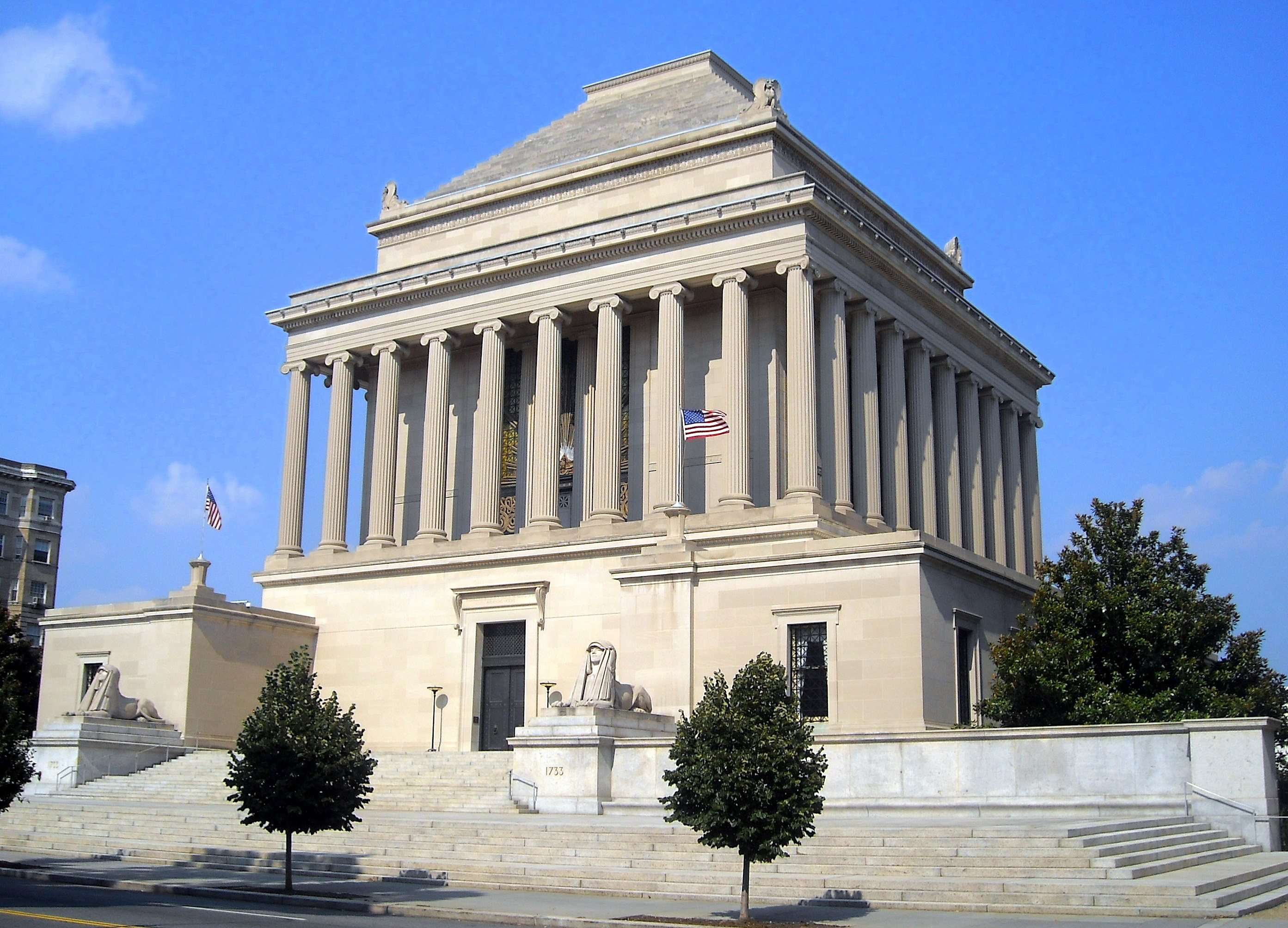
- House of the Temple in 2008

- Location within Washington, D.C.

General information
- Architectural style: American Neoclassicism
- Location: 1733 16th St NW, Washington, D.C., United States
- Coordinates: 38.9138°N 77.0359°W
- Construction started: October 18, 1911
- Completed: October 18, 1915
- Client: Scottish Rite of Freemasonry

Design and construction
- Architect: John Russell Pope

The House of the Temple (officially, Home of The Supreme Council, 33°, Ancient & Accepted Scottish Rite of Freemasonry, Southern Jurisdiction, Washington D.C., U.S.A.) is a Masonic temple in Washington, D.C., United States, that serves as the headquarters of the Scottish Rite of Freemasonry, Southern Jurisdiction, U.S.A.

Designed by John Russell Pope, it stands at 1733 16th Street, N.W., in the Dupont Circle neighborhood, about one mile directly north of the White House. The full name of the Supreme Council is "The Supreme Council (Mother Council of the World) of the Inspectors General Knights Commander of the House of the Temple of Solomon of the Thirty-third degree of the Ancient and Accepted Scottish Rite of Freemasonry of the Southern Jurisdiction of the United States of America." It was modeled after the tomb of Mausolus at Halicarnassus.

The Temple holds one of the world's largest collection of materials related to Scottish poet and Freemason Robert Burns outside of Scotland. The Temple's main Library is the first and oldest public library in Washington, D.C.

== History ==
On May 31, 1911, 110 years after the founding of the Supreme Council, Grand Commander James D. Richardson broke ground on the spot where the House of the Temple now stands in Washington, D.C. Grand Master J. Claude Keiper, of the Grand Lodge of the District of Columbia, laid the cornerstone in the northeast corner on October 18, 1911.

The temple was designed by architect John Russell Pope, who modeled it after the tomb of Mausolus at Halicarnassus, one of the Seven Wonders of the Ancient World. The building was dedicated four years later on October 18, 1915.

The building's design was widely praised by contemporary architects, and it won Pope the Gold Medal of the Architectural League of New York in 1917. In his 1920 book L'Architecture aux États-Unis, French architect Jacques Gréber described it as "a monument of remarkable sumptuousness ... the ensemble is an admirable study of antique architecture stamped with a powerful dignity." Fiske Kimball's 1928 book American Architecture describes it as "an example of the triumph of classical form in America". In the 1920s, a panel of architects named it "one of the three best public buildings" in the United States, along with the Nebraska State Capitol and the Pan American Union Building in Washington, D.C. In 1932, it was ranked as one of the ten top buildings in the country in a poll of federal government architects.

In 1944, the remains of former Sovereign Grand Commander and Confederate General Albert Pike were removed from Oak Hill Cemetery in Georgetown and placed in the House of the Temple. The remains of Past Grand Commander John Henry Cowles were entombed in the temple in 1952, after his 31-year reign as Grand Commander. The Temple also holds the second largest collections of materials related to Scottish poet and Freemason Robert Burns outside of Scotland in its library. When the library opened in 1870, it was the first public library in Washington, D.C.

The House of the Temple is designated as a contributing property to the Sixteenth Street Historic District, listed on the National Register of Historic Places in 1978.

From 1990 to 2011, the temple hosted a community garden on its grounds, with the garden occupying about 0.25-acre (1,000 m^{2}), divided into approximately 70 small plots tended by nearby residents. In fall 2011, the Temple closed the garden in order to use the space to stage construction equipment for a building rehabilitation project.

== In popular culture ==
In the 2009 novel The Lost Symbol by Dan Brown, the building is the setting for several key scenes.

== Gallery ==
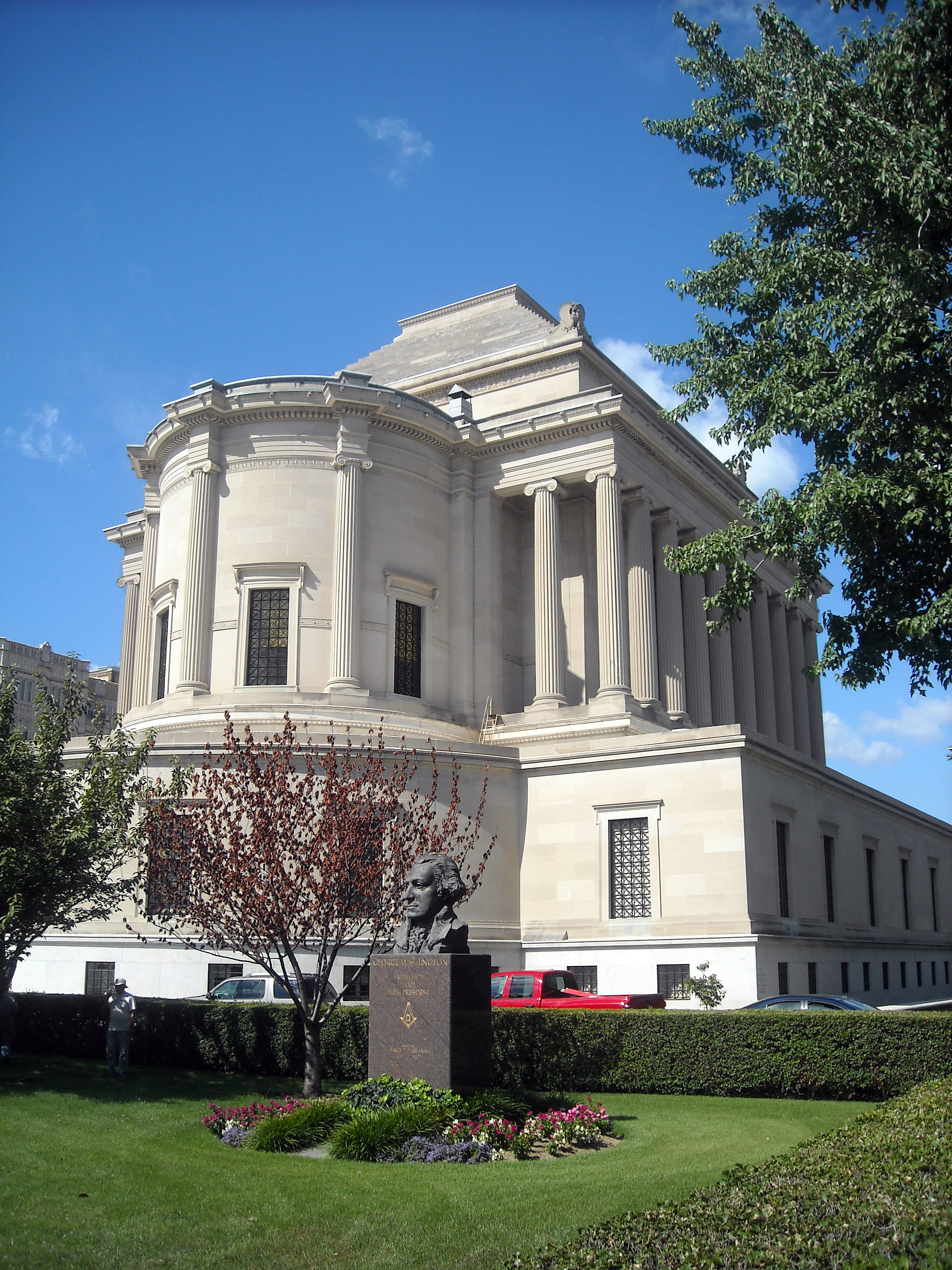
House of the Temple rear view before construction of condominiums

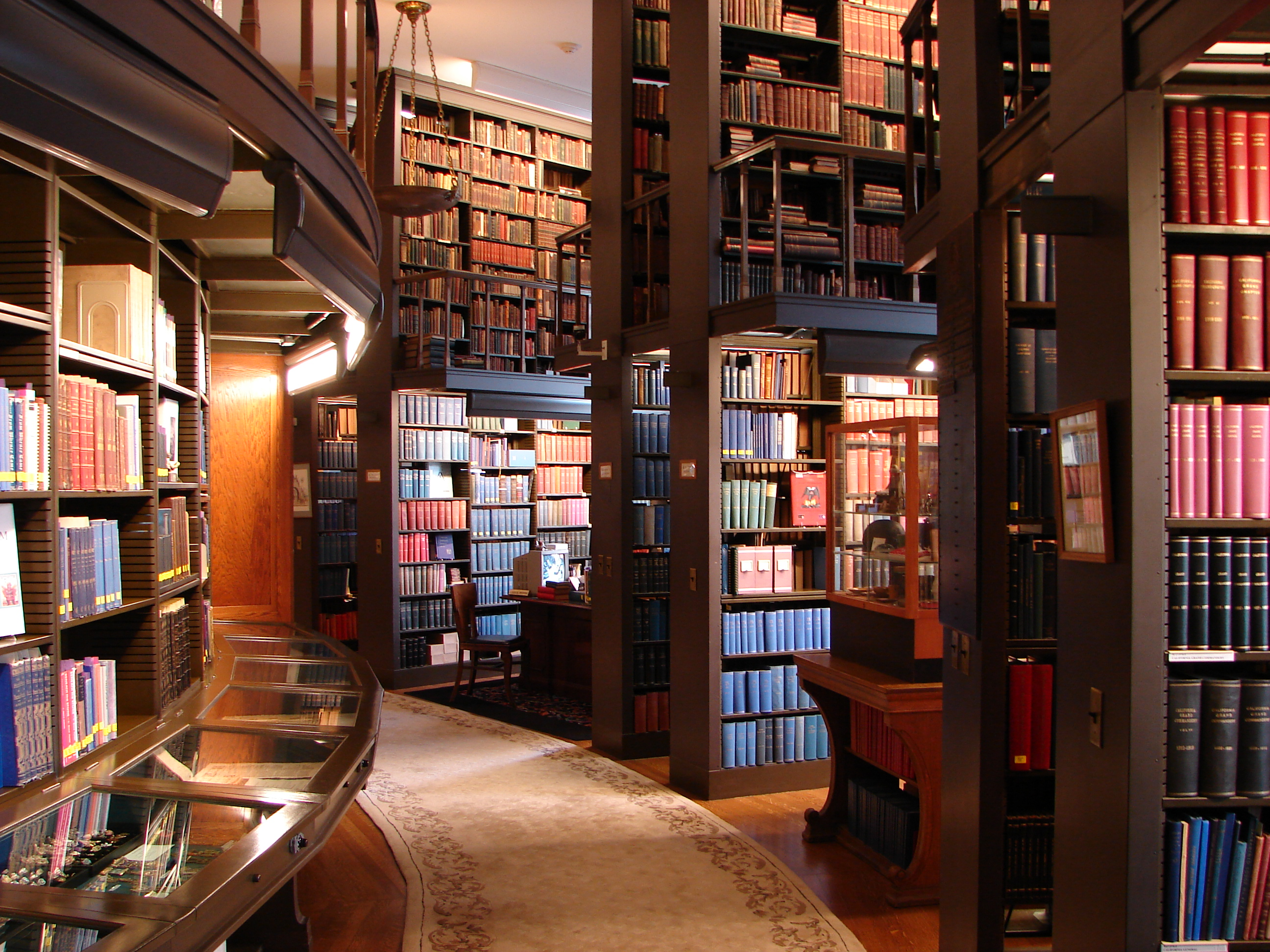
House of the Temple Library

Interior of the upper chamber in the House of the Temple

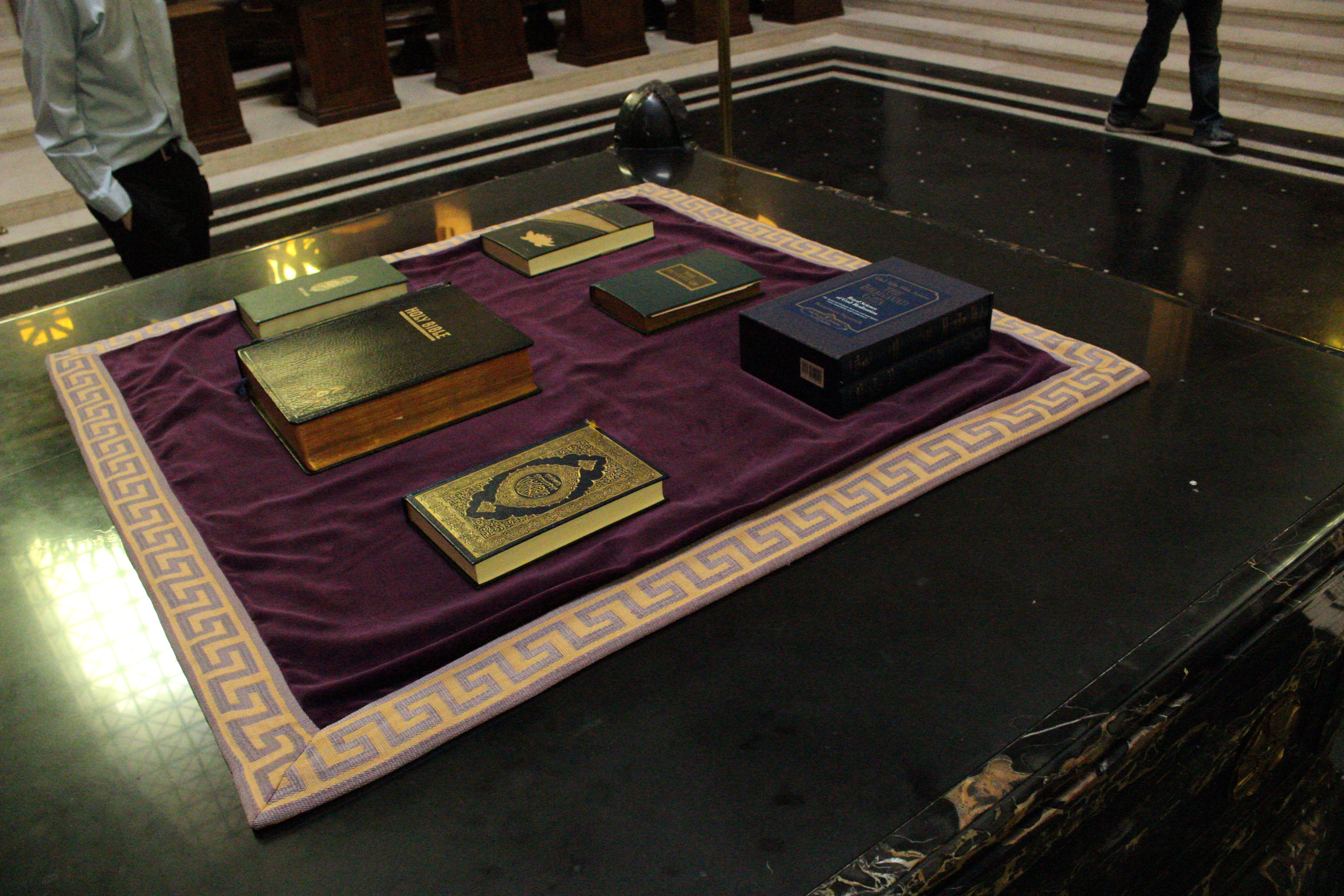
Holy books displayed in the upper chamber

== See also ==
- List of Masonic buildings in the United States
- List of Masonic libraries
- Masonic Temple (Washington, DC), nearby building that was a Masonic temple from 1903 to 1983.
- Julius Lansburgh Furniture Co., Inc., office building that was a Masonic temple from 1870 to 1921.
