= Simon W. Robinson =

Born in New Hampton, New Hampshire, on February 19, 1792, Simon Wiggin Robinson was the son of Captain Noah Robinson, who served honorably in the American Revolution. Young Robinson served his country, also, in the War of 1812 when he was stationed at Portsmouth, New Hampshire, as an Adjutant.

At the war's end, he left the Army and settled in Boston where he entered into commercial business until his retirement about 1847. He served in the state legislature for a year, although he never entered into active politics, and as a civil magistrate. It was following his retirement that he moved to Lexington on Elm Street (now Harrington Road), where he lived until his death on October 16, 1868. He was married, twice, and survived by his widow, two sons and two daughters.

Simon W. Robinson was raised to the Third Degree of Freemasonry on January 20, 1820, in Mount Lebanon Lodge, Boston. He served the Lodge as Master in 1824 and 1845 and was Lodge Treasurer from 1828 to 1843. He served the Grand Lodge of Masons in Massachusetts as Junior Grand Warden, 1837; Senior Grand Warden, 1838 through 1840, and Deputy Grand Master, 1841 through 1843. He was elected Grand Master of all Masons in Massachusetts in 1846 and served for three years.

In the York Rite of Freemasonry, he was exalted in St. Paul's Royal Arch Chapter in 1821, serving as High Priest (1825-26) and Grand High Priest of the Grand Royal Arch Chapter of Massachusetts (1837-39). He was greeted in Boston Council, Royal and Select Masters, in 1828 and served as Principal Conductor of the Work in 1840. He was knighted in Boston Encampment (now Commandery) in 1835 and a charter member of DeMolay Commandery in 1848, serving as Grand Commander of the Grand Encampment (Commandery) of Massachusetts and Rhode Island (1854 -55).

In Scottish Rite Freemasonry, he received the Fourth Degree to the Sixteenth Degrees in 1842 in Boston Grand Council of Princes of Jerusalem. Minutes of the Scottish Rite Supreme Council, Northern Masonic Jurisdiction, note the issuance of a dispensation to confer the Thirtieth to Thirty-second Degrees on then Grand Master Simon W. Robinson. He was elevated to the Thirty-third Degree on August 25, 1851. In September 1851 he was appointed Grand Treasurer General by Grand Commander Edward Asa Raymond, a position he held until 1860.

This was an interesting period in Scottish Rite Masonic history. There were several bodies at various times in the mid-nineteenth century purporting to be authorized Supreme Councils and conferring versions of the degrees. For the details of this era, we look to other histories. Of interest here, is the fact that the elected and acknowledged Sovereign Grand Commander of the Northern Jurisdiction Supreme Council, Edward A. Raymond, in August, 1860, as a result of a disagreement over his authority, left the Supreme Council, in session, and in December, 1860, formed a new Supreme Council.

Simon W. Robinson left the Northern Supreme Council with his friend and associate, Raymond, and assisted in establishing the new body which he served as Grand Treasurer General (1860-61) and Lieutenant Grand Commander (1861-63). The Raymond Council merged with the Hays-Cerneau Council, becoming known as the Hays-Raymond Council, which Robinson served as 1st Lieutenant Commander (1863-65) and Sovereign Grand Commander (1865-66) until the voluntary dissolution of that body. He attempted briefly to revive the Raymond Council in December 1866, until resigning command, as a lost cause, in May 1867. In the Union of 1867, his status as an active member of the Northern Supreme Council was reinstated.

He died at his Lexington residence on October 16, 1868. Interment was at Mount Auburn Cemetery.

A Freemason's Lodge, Simon W Robinson Lodge, AF&AM, was dedicated to him in 1870 in the town of Lexington, Massachusetts in the jurisdiction of the Grand Lodge of Massachusetts. That Lodge continues to meet in Lexington, and as of the 2018-2019 Masonic year is the seventh largest Masonic Lodge in Massachusetts.
