= Scottish Rite Masonic Museum & Library =

Museum in Lexington, Massachusetts

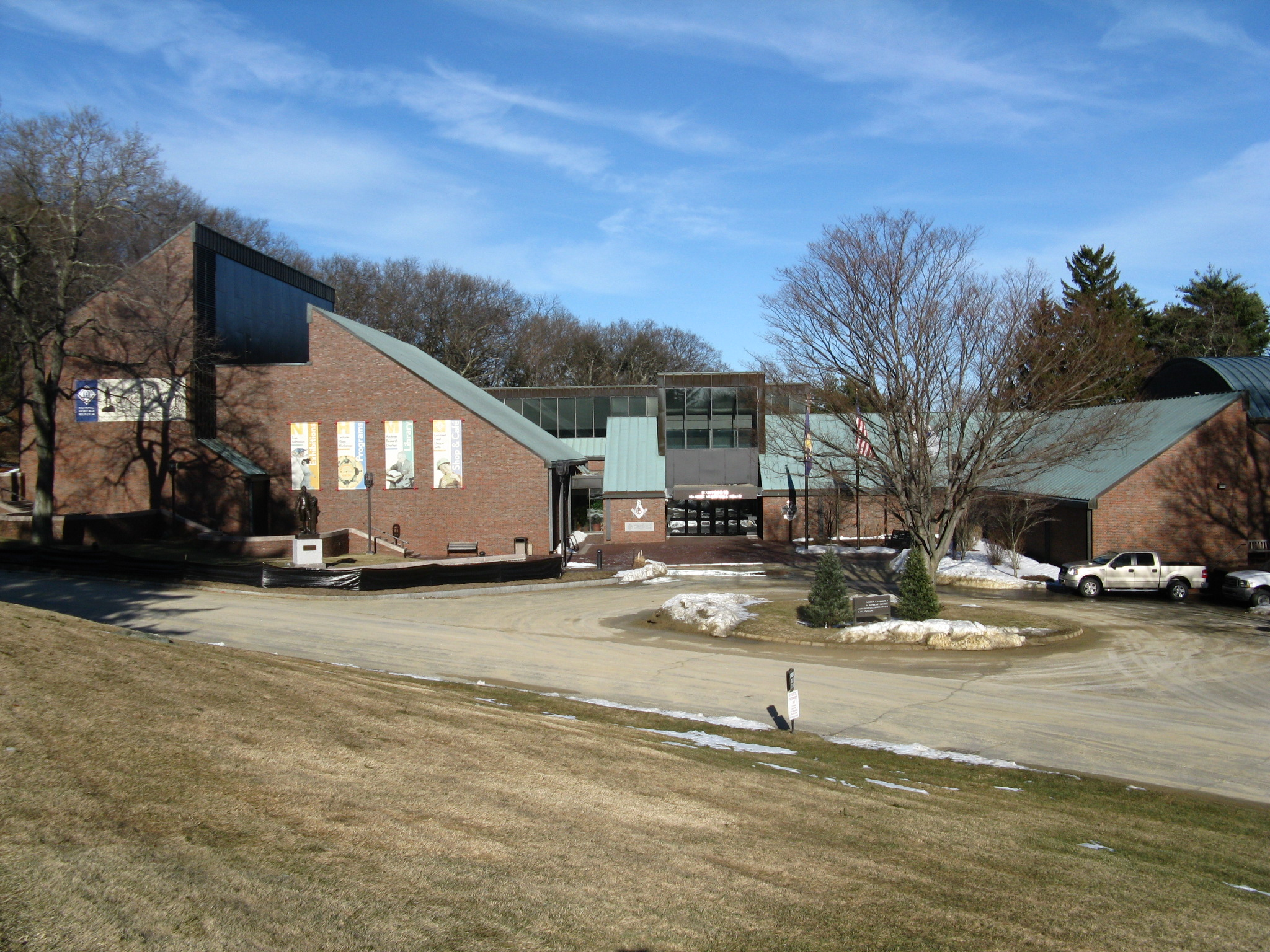
- The entrance to the museum from just inside the parking lot off Marrett Road
- Established: 1975; 51 years ago
- Location: Lexington, Massachusetts, U.S.
- Coordinates: 42°26′12.2″N 71°12′51.2″W
- Collections: Van Gorden-Williams Library & Archives
- Owner: Scottish Rite
- Parking: on-site
- Website: monh.org

The Scottish Rite Masonic Museum & Library, formerly known as the National Heritage Museum and the Museum of Our National Heritage, is a museum located in Lexington, Massachusetts. Its emphasis is on American history, Freemasonry, and fraternalism, including co-ed and women's organizations, and it contains the Van Gorden-Williams Library & Archives. The museum was founded in 1975, to correspond with the start of the Bicentennial of the United States and is partially funded by the Supreme Council, Northern Masonic Jurisdiction of the Scottish Rite, an appendant body of Freemasonry.

The museum features general interest galleries with changing exhibits about fraternal organizations such as the Masons, American history and culture, and Lexington's role in the American Revolution.

Since 2013, the same building houses the headquarters of the Supreme Council, Northern Masonic Jurisdiction of the Scottish Rite. Previously, the headquarters was located in a 1905-built mansion which was sold to the Town of Lexington in 2013, to build a community center.

== See also ==
- List of Masonic libraries
