= Morals and Dogma of the Ancient and Accepted Scottish Rite of Freemasonry =

1871 book by Albert Pike

Morals and Dogma of the Ancient and Accepted Scottish Rite of Freemasonry, or simply Morals and Dogma, is a book of esoteric philosophy published by the Supreme Council, Thirty Third Degree, of the Scottish Rite, Southern Jurisdiction of the United States. It was compiled by Albert Pike, was first published in 1871 and was regularly reprinted thereafter until 1969. An upgraded official reprint was released in 2011, with annotations by Arturo de Hoyos, 33°, G∴C∴, the Scottish Rite, Southern Jurisdiction's Grand Archivist and Grand Historian.

== Contents ==
The Double Headed Eagle emblem of the Scottish Rite, from the cover of Morals and Dogma.

Morals and Dogma has been described as "a collection of thirty-two essays which provide a philosophical rationale for the degrees of the Ancient and Accepted Scottish Rite. The lectures provided a backdrop for the degrees by giving lessons in comparative religion, history and philosophy".

The original printing had 861 pages of text, while a 218-page Digest-Index was added by Trevanion W. Hugo, 33°, in 1909. Its thirty-two chapters discuss the philosophical symbolism of a degree of Scottish Rite Freemasonry in extensive detail. In Pike's original Preface, he noted:

In preparing this work, the Grand Commander has been about equally Author and Compiler; since he has extracted quite half of its contents from the works of the best writers and most philosophic or eloquent thinkers. Perhaps it would have been better and more acceptable if he had extracted more and written less.

He continued:

Everyone is entirely free to reject and dissent from whatsoever herein may seem to him to be untrue or unsound.

Though the text does not explicitly describe Masonic ritual it offers a context by which they can be better appreciated. In his allocution of 1947, Pike's successor, Grand Commander John Henry Cowles, noted that some Masonic publications had used large extracts from the text, which practice he sought to curtail by adding the following words to the title page: 'Esoteric Book, for Scottish Rite use only; to be Returned upon Withdrawal or Death of Recipient' (Transactions of the Supreme Council, 33°, S.J. (1947), p. 38). Although Morals and Dogma is an esoteric book, it was not a secret one; Pike's original preface was clear that any Mason could own the book, but only Scottish Rite Masons would be encouraged to own one.

There are 32 chapters, one for each of the degrees in the Southern Jurisdiction, except for the 33°. These chapters generally consist of comparative religion, philosophy, comparative etymologies, symbolism, and numerology. The primary themes are the "Secrets" or the "Great Mysteries" and their symbolism and rituals. It is stated that nothing in the book is meant to unveil any of the secrets of Freemasonry but to simply hint or shed light. An emphasis on religious and cultural tolerance is shown throughout the work, emphasizing that religions strive to enlighten mankind and encourage a belief in the something greater. By comparing and contrasting religious beliefs and practices, Pike's compilation is similar to James G. Frazer's The Golden Bough, and fits within the broader context of cultural anthropology. Pike, who was a Christian, avoids syncretism. He rather saw similarities in religion as a means for mutual understanding and fostering brotherhood.

A copy of Morals and Dogma was given to new members of the Southern Jurisdiction from the early 1900s until the mid-1970s. In 1974, it was replaced by Clausen's Commentaries on Morals and Dogma, written by Henry Clausen, 33°, Sovereign Grand Commander, which in 1988 was itself replaced by A Bridge To Light, by Rex Hutchens, 33°, G∴C∴, which book continues to be available to initiates into the Scottish Rite in the Southern Jurisdiction. With the release of the authorized edition of 2011, Morals and Dogma is once more being given to new Scottish Rite Masons in the Southern Jurisdiction.

During Pike's lifetime the Northern Masonic Jurisdiction based many of their degrees upon Pike's rituals, although they subsequently revised them many times, and never presented initiates with Morals and Dogma, nor any of the subsequent commentaries.

== Influences and plagiarism allegations ==
One of Pike's influences was the French author Éliphas Lévi, the pen name of Alphonse Louis Constant. Lévi was a prolific writer on occult topics who, in Pike's day, was considered an expert on pagan mysteries and Gnosticism. However, since his death, others have questioned his expertise. For instance, occult scholar, A. E. Waite, after researching Levi's texts relating to the Kabalah, wrote: "I do not think that he [Lévi] ever made an independent statement upon any historical fact to which the least confidence could be given with prudence.".

In his book Dogme et Rituel de la Haute Magie (1855), Lévi claimed that Freemasonry had its roots in ancient pagan rituals, and Pike accepted many of these claims. According to Chris Hodapp, "whole passages of Levi's book [were] made into Pike's".

French philosopher René Guénon noticed that "a considerable part of ... Morals and Dogma of Freemasonry is clearly plagiarized from Dogme et Rituel de la Haute Magie by the French occultist Éliphas Lévi". Craig Heimbichner and Adam Parfrey write that Pike "seemed untroubled by the need to properly attribute text that he borrowed or lifted" and that in Morals and Dogma "Pike plagiarized from the French occultist Eliphas Lévi."

While Pike borrowed extensively from Lévi, he extracted even more prose from the works of the Rev. Orville Dewey, Rev. Theodore Parker, George Oliver, Charles Francois Dupuis, and Jacques Matter. The Annotated Edition by Arturo de Hoyos cites paragraph-by-paragraph virtually all the sources which amount to over a hundred other authors.

== Republication history ==
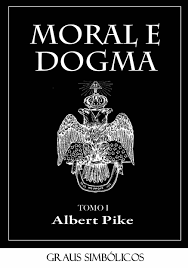

Eventually Morals and Dogma entered the public domain and like many public domain works, it was reprinted many times by various publishers. In August 2011, the Supreme Council, 33°, S.J., announced that they had published a new annotated edition. Titled Albert Pike’s Morals and Dogma: Annotated Edition, the work was prepared by Arturo de Hoyos, 33°, G∴C∴, the Scottish Rite's Grand Archivist and Grand Historian. The text is reprinted in full, with about 4000 scholarly notes on difficult passages, touching on historical, religious, and philosophical issues. The new edition is augmented by subject headings, and illustrations from the original books Pike used, new paragraph numbers, and corrections based upon original texts.
