= Edward Asa Raymond =

Edward Asa Raymond (1791–1864) also, Asa Raymond, Junior was a Grand Master of the Masonic Grand Lodge of Massachusetts from 1849 to 1851.

Raymond was born in Worcester, Massachusetts as "Asa" and inserted the name "Edward", officially changed his name on or around February 24, 1825. He was a member of the Amicable Lodge of Masons in Cambridge, Massachusetts.

In the Northern Masonic Jurisdiction of the Scottish Rite, he served as Grand Treasurer and later Grand Sovereign Commander (1851–1860). The end of his tenure as Grand Commander created a schism in the Northern Masonic Jurisdiction which resulted in two competing organizations that both claimed legitimacy.

In 1860, at a meeting of the Supreme Council, Raymond "refused to act on a motion, blocked a motion to adjourn, and then declared the Council closed. The next day, immediately after the opening and the reading of the minutes, he closed the Council 'sine die,' or indefinitely, and walked out." Killian Henry Van Rensselaer was elected as Lieutenant Grand Commander in his absence, who then served as acting Grand Commander. In 1862, Van Rensselaer expelled Raymond from the Scottish Rite.

This schism was eventually resolved in 1867, three years after Raymond's 1864 death in Brookline, Massachusetts.
