= Albert Pike =

American author, Freemason, and soldier (1809–1891)

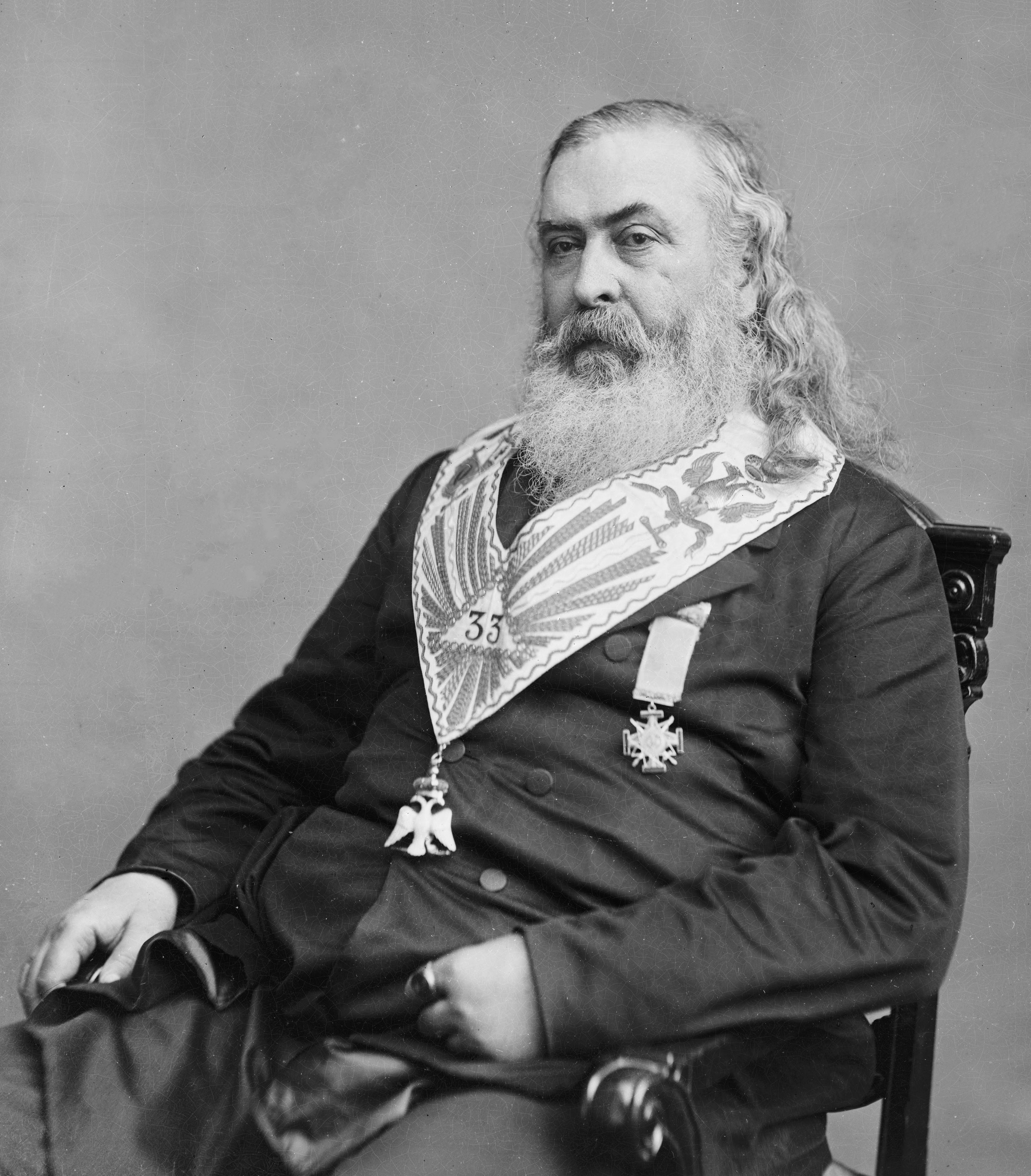
- Pike in Masonic regalia by Mathew Brady

Associate Justice of the Arkansas Supreme Court
- In exile
- In office June 8, 1864 – May 28, 1865
- Appointed by: Harris Flanagin
- Preceded by: Hulbert F. Fairchild
- Succeeded by: Charles A. Harper

Personal details
- Born: December 29, 1809 Boston, Massachusetts, U.S.
- Died: April 2, 1891 (aged 81) Washington, D.C., U.S.
- Resting place: Oak Hill Cemetery, Washington, D.C. 38°54′45.9″N 77°03′21.4″W

Military service
- Allegiance: United States; Confederate States
- Service: United States Volunteers; Confederate States Army
- Years of service: 1846–1847 (U.S.); 1861–1862 (C.S.)
- Rank: Captain (U.S.); Brigadier general (C.S.)
- Commands: Company E, Arkansas Mounted Infantry Regiment (1846–1847); District of Indian Territory (1861–1862)
- Battles: Mexican–American War; Battle of Buena Vista; American Civil War; Battle of Pea Ridge

Albert Pike (December 29, 1809 – April 2, 1891) was an American author, poet, orator, editor, lawyer, jurist and Confederate States Army general who served as an associate justice of the Arkansas Supreme Court in exile from 1864 to 1865. He had previously served as a senior officer of the Confederate States Army, commanding the District of Indian Territory in the Trans-Mississippi Theater. A prominent member of the Freemasons, Pike served as the Sovereign Grand Commander of the Supreme Council, Scottish Rite, Southern Jurisdiction from 1859 to 1891.

== Early life and education ==
Albert Pike was born in Boston, Massachusetts, on December 29, 1809, the son of Benjamin and Sarah (Andrews) Pike. He grew up in Byfield and Newburyport, Massachusetts. His colonial ancestors had settled in the area in 1635, and included John Pike (1613–1688/1689), the founder of Woodbridge, New Jersey.

He attended school in Newburyport and Framingham until he was 15. In August 1825, he passed entrance exams at Harvard University, though he was unable to afford the tuition and chose not to attend. He began a program of self-education, later teaching school in Gloucester, North Bedford, Fairhaven and Newburyport.

Pike was an imposing figure; 6 feet (1.83 m) tall and 300 pounds (140 kg) with hair that reached his shoulders and a long beard. In 1831, he left Massachusetts to travel west, first stopping in Nashville, Tennessee.

He later moved to St. Louis, Missouri, where he joined a hunting and trading expedition to Taos, New Mexico. En route his horse broke and ran, forcing Pike to walk the remaining 500 miles (800 km) to Taos. After this, he joined a trapping expedition to the Llano Estacado in New Mexico and Texas. Trapping was minimal and, after traveling about 1,300 miles (2,100 km), half of it on foot, he finally arrived at Fort Smith, Arkansas.

== Career ==
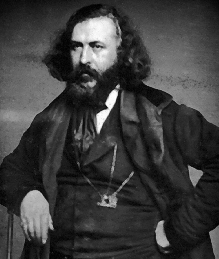
Pike, about 1850

Settling in Arkansas in 1833, Pike taught in a school and wrote a series of articles for the Little Rock Arkansas Advocate under the pen name of "Casca." The articles were sufficiently well received for him to be asked to join the newspaper's staff. Under Pike's administration, the Advocate promoted the viewpoint of the Whig Party in a politically volatile and divided Arkansas in December 1832. After marrying Mary Ann Hamilton in 1834, he purchased the newspaper.

He was the first reporter for the Arkansas Supreme Court. He wrote a book (published anonymously), titled The Arkansas Form Book, which was a guidebook for lawyers. Pike began to study law and was admitted to the bar in 1837, selling the Advocate the same year. (At least one source indicates that Pike read Kent and Blackstone and was admitted to the bar in 1834 by Superior Court judge Thomas J. Lacy, after a perfunctory examination.)

He proved to be a highly effective lawyer, representing clients in courts at every level. This continued after he received permission in 1849 to practice before the United States Supreme Court.

He also made several contacts among the Native American tribes in the area. He specialized in claims on behalf of Native Americans against the federal government. In 1852, he represented the Creek Nation before the Supreme Court in a claim regarding ceded tribal land. In 1854 he advocated for the Choctaw and Chickasaw, although compensation later awarded to the tribes in 1856 and 1857 was insufficient. These relationships were to influence the course of his Civil War service.

Pike also began a campaign of newspaper essays urging support for the construction of a transcontinental railroad to extend from New Orleans to the Pacific coast. He moved to New Orleans in 1853 and prepared to pass the state bar in furtherance of his campaign. He ultimately secured a charter from the Louisiana State Legislature for a project, following which he returned to Little Rock in 1857.

He joined the anti-Catholic Know Nothing Party at its founding; in the summer of 1854, he helped introduce the party in Arkansas. He attended the national convention in 1856, but walked out when it failed to adopt a pro-slavery platform.

As part of the Committee of the Citizens of Little Rock and Pulaski County in 1858, Pike joined 11 other men in signing a circular that encouraged the people of Arkansas to expel free Blacks from Arkansas. It said that the "evil is the existence among us of a class of free colored persons".

Additionally, Pike wrote on several legal subjects. He also continued writing poetry, a hobby he had begun in his youth in Massachusetts. His poems were highly regarded in his day, but are now mostly forgotten. Several volumes of his works were privately published posthumously by his daughter. In 1859, he received an honorary Master of Arts degree from Harvard.

== Poetry ==
As a young man of letters, Pike wrote poetry, and he continued to do so for the rest of his life. At 23, he published his first poem, "Hymns to the Gods." Later work was printed in literary journals such as Blackwood's Edinburgh Magazine and local newspapers. His first collection of poetry, Prose Sketches and Poems Written in the Western Country, was published in 1834. He later gathered many of his poems and republished them in Hymns to the Gods and Other Poems (1872). After his death these were published again in Gen. Albert Pike's Poems (1900) and Lyrics and Love Songs (1916).

The authorship of "The Old Canoe" was attributed to Pike. He was suggested as author because about the time of its publication, when it was going the rounds of the press, probably without any credit, a doggerel called "The Old Canoe" was composed about Pike by one of his political foes. The subject was a canoe in which he left Columbia, Tennessee, when a young man practicing law in that place. Pike told Senator Edward W. Carmack that he was not the author of "The Old Canoe," and could not imagine how he ever got the credit for it. The rightful author was Emily Rebecca Page.

== Freemasonry ==
Pike first joined the fraternal Independent Order of Odd Fellows in 1840. He joined a Masonic Lodge in 1850, where he became extremely active in the affairs of the organization. That same year, he helped found St. John's College in Arkansas, a Masonic sponsored institution. On April 25, 1857, Pike received the 33rd degree in Louisiana by former members of the Supreme Council of Louisiana.

In 1859 he was elected Sovereign Grand Commander of the Scottish Rite's Southern Jurisdiction. He remained Sovereign Grand Commander for the rest of his life, devoting a large amount of his time to developing the rituals of the order.

He published a book called Morals and Dogma of the Ancient and Accepted Scottish Rite of Freemasonry in 1871, the first of several editions. This helped the Order grow during the nineteenth century. He also researched and wrote a seminal treatise on Indo-Aryan Deities and Worship as Contained in the Rig-Veda. In the United States, Pike is still considered an eminent and influential Freemason, primarily in the Scottish Rite Southern Jurisdiction.

Pike was also the Provincial Grand Master of the Royal Order of Scotland from 1877 to 1891.

== Military service ==
=== Mexican–American War ===
When the Mexican–American War started, Pike joined the Arkansas Mounted Infantry Regiment and was commissioned as a company commander with the rank of captain in June 1846. With his regiment, he fought in the Battle of Buena Vista. Pike was discharged in June 1847. He and his commander, Colonel John Selden Roane, had several differences of opinion. This situation led finally to an "inconclusive" duel between Pike and Roane on July 29, 1847, near Fort Smith, Arkansas. Although several shots were fired in the duel, nobody was injured, and the two were persuaded by their seconds to discontinue it.

After the war, Pike returned to the practice of law, moving to New Orleans for a time beginning in 1853. He wrote another book, Maxims of the Roman Law and Some of the Ancient French Law, as Expounded and Applied in Doctrine and Jurisprudence. Although unpublished, this book increased his reputation among his associates in law. He returned to Arkansas in 1857, gaining some amount of prominence in the legal field.

At the Southern Commercial Convention of 1854, Pike said the South should remain in the Union and seek equality with the North, but if the South "were forced into an inferior status, she would be better out of the Union than in it." His stand was that state's rights superseded national law and he supported the idea of a Southern secession. This stand is made clear in his pamphlet of 1861, "State or Province, Bond or Free?"

=== American Civil War ===
In 1861, Pike penned the lyrics to "Dixie to Arms!" At the beginning of the war, Pike was appointed as Confederate envoy to Native American nations. In this capacity he negotiated several treaties, one of the most important being with Cherokee chief John Ross, which was concluded in 1861. At the time, Ross agreed to support the Confederacy, which promised the tribes a Native American state if it won the war. Ross later changed his mind and left Indian Territory, but the succeeding Cherokee government maintained the alliance.

Pike was commissioned as a brigadier general in the Confederate States Army on November 22, 1861, and given a command in the Indian Territory. With Brig. Gen. Ben McCulloch, Pike trained three Confederate regiments of Indian cavalry, most of whom belonged to the "civilized tribes", whose loyalty to the Confederacy was variable. Although initially victorious at the Battle of Pea Ridge (Elkhorn Tavern) in March 1862, Pike's unit was defeated later in a counterattack, after falling into disarray. When Pike was ordered in May 1862 to send troops to Arkansas, he resigned in protest. As in the previous war, Pike came into conflict with his superior officers, at one time drafting a letter to Jefferson Davis complaining about his direct superior.

After Pea Ridge, it was alleged that Pike's Native American troops had scalped soldiers in the field. The single incident of scalping was, however, done by a Native American acting on his own. According to official records submitted to the Headquarters Department of Indian territory, Pike "regarded [the incident] with horror" and was personally "angry and disgusted." He also filed a report in which he said it caused him the "utmost pain and regret."

Maj. Gen. Thomas C. Hindman charged Pike with mishandling of money and material, ordering his arrest. The incident arose when Hindman, who had declared martial law in Arkansas, ordered Pike to turn over weapons and Native American Indian treaty funds. Pike thought the action was illegal and refused. Both these charges were later found to be considerably lacking in evidence; nevertheless Pike, facing arrest, escaped into the hills of Arkansas, submitting his resignation from the Confederate States Army on July 12, 1862. He was arrested on November 3 on charges of insubordination and treason, and held briefly in Warren, Texas. His resignation was accepted on November 11, and he was allowed to return to Arkansas.

As Union troops advanced toward the state capital in September 1863, the State Supreme Court retreated to Washington, Arkansas, which was made the new Confederate state capital. Associate Justice Hulbert F. Fairchild resigned because the new location was too far from his family, and Pike was appointed as his replacement.

In the wake of the war, Pike moved to New York City, then for a short time to Canada. On June 24, 1865, Pike applied to President Andrew Johnson for a pardon, disowning his earlier interpretation of the U.S. Constitution. He said he now planned "to pursue the arts of peace, to practice my profession, to live among my books, and to labour to benefit my fellows and my race by other than political courses". President Johnson pardoned him on April 23, 1866.

== Later life and death ==
During the Arkansas political conflict known as the Brooks-Baxter War, Pike was one of the lawyers to speak on behalf of Elisha Baxter.

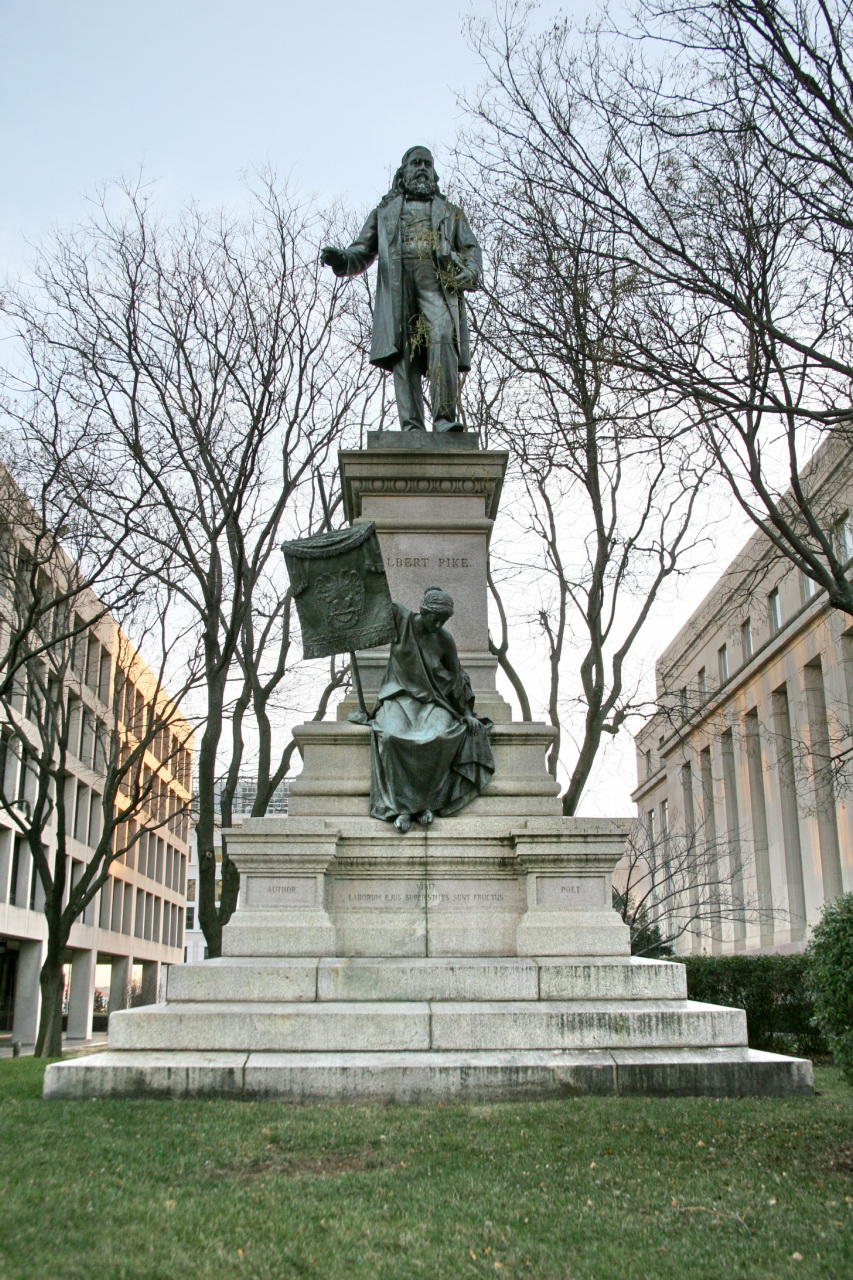
The Albert Pike Memorial

Pike died on April 2, 1891, at the Scottish Rite Temple of the Supreme Council in Washington DC, at the age of 81, and was buried at Oak Hill Cemetery, despite his prior instructions to be cremated. In 1944, his remains were moved to the House of the Temple, headquarters of the Southern Jurisdiction of the Scottish Rite. The House of the Temple contains numerous memorials and artifacts related to Pike, including his personal library.

== Legacy ==
A memorial to Pike was erected in 1901 in the Judiciary Square neighborhood of Washington, D.C. The statue portrayed him as a private citizen and Freemason. He was the only former Confederate military officer with an outdoor statue in Washington, D.C. In 1992, the D.C. Council petitioned the federal government to remove it. In 2017, protesters circled the monument after a Unite the Right rally, calling for it to be torn down, a sentiment echoed by the D.C. Council. In July 2019, Delegate Eleanor Holmes Norton introduced a bill to remove the statue but still preserve its history. On June 19, 2020, protestors tore down the statue and set it ablaze, in connection with the George Floyd protests because of Pike's association with the Confederacy and of his alleged association with the Ku Klux Klan. The statue was restored and reinstalled in Judiciary Square in October 2025 following an executive order by President Donald Trump.

The Albert Pike Memorial Temple is an historic Masonic lodge in Little Rock, Arkansas; the structure is listed on the National Register of Historic Places.

Albert Pike Highway was an auto trail that extended more than 900 miles (1,400 km) from Hot Springs, Arkansas, to Colorado Springs, Colorado, crossing the Ozark Mountains and passing through Fort Smith, Muskogee, Tulsa, Dodge City, La Junta and Pueblo.

== Incidents and concerns ==
=== Masonic baptism ===
In 1865, Pike publicly performed a ceremony of Masonic baptism in New York City. The ceremony was greeted with skepticism by many American Masons including Albert Mackey, but was based on older European Masonic baptism ceremonies that began in the 1820s. However, some, like the New York Times, reacted positively to the ceremony describing it as "interesting" and "novel." In the ritual, six children were baptized by Pike with water and consecrated oil.

=== Racism ===
In the aftermath of the Civil War, as former Confederates found themselves barred from the ballot box, Pike remained deeply opposed to black suffrage, insisting that "the white race, and that race alone, shall govern this country. It is the only one that is fit to govern, and it is the only one that shall."

Regarding membership in the Freemasons, Pike is quoted as saying in 1875 that "Prince Hall Lodge was as regular a Lodge as any Lodge created by competent authority. It had a perfect right to establish other Lodges and make itself a Mother Lodge. I am not inclined to meddle in the matter. I took my obligations from white men, not from negroes. When I have to accept negroes as brothers or leave masonry, I shall leave it. Better let the thing drift."

His attitudes towards African-Americans may have changed towards the end of his life. A 1945 letter written by Willard W. Allen, the Sovereign Grand Commander of the United Supreme Council, S.J. Prince Hall Affiliation noted that "what practically all Masonic scholars know very well, viz., that in the closing years of General Pike's Masonic career, he became a very staunch friend of Negro Masonry." Pike had become a personal friend of Thornton A. Jackson, Supreme Grand Commander of the United Supreme Council, Southern Jurisdiction, Prince Hall Affiliation and even gifted to Thornton his complete set of rituals for Prince Hall Scottish Rite Masonry to use.

=== Involvement with the Ku Klux Klan ===
Pike first wrote about the Ku Klux Klan less than three years after the Klan's founding, in an April 16, 1868 editorial in the Memphis Daily Appeal. In the editorial, Pike indicated that his main problems lay not with its aims, but with its methods and leadership. Later in this editorial, he proposed "one great Order of Southern Brotherhood", a secret society which would have been a larger and more centrally organized version of the Klan: "If it were in our power, if it could be effected, we would unite every white man in the South, who is opposed to negro suffrage, into one great Order of Southern Brotherhood, with an organization complete, active, vigorous, in which a few should execute the concentrated will of all, and whose very existence should be concealed from all but its members."

In 1905's Ku Klux Klan: Its Origin, Growth and Disbandment, the author Walter L. Fleming, lists Pike as the Klan's "chief judicial officer". Susan Lawrence Davis, whose father, Edmund Pettus, was a founding member of the Klan in Alabama, writes in her sympathetic account titled Authentic History: Ku Klux Klan, 1865–1877, published in 1924, that Pike was personally chosen by Nathan Bedford Forrest to serve as the Klan's "Chief Judicial Officer" and to head the Klan in Arkansas as "Grand Dragon of that Realm." In 1939's Invisible Empire: The Story of the Ku Klux Klan, 1866–1871, Stanley Horn, who served as president of the Tennessee Historical Society, also reports that Forrest appointed Pike to lead the Klan in Arkansas and credits him with a surge of local Klan activity in April 1868. Horn says that a pro-Klan poem, "Death's Brigade", is attributed to Pike, although "of course, he did not have the bravado to claim that honor publicly at that time." Southern Agrarian poet John Gould Fletcher, who grew up in Little Rock in a house that Pike built, likewise believed that Pike wrote the poem.

When the Ku Klux Klan was revived in 1915, there even existed an Albert Pike Klan, a local chapter of the organization based in Illinois.

In 1971, Allen W. Trelease published White Terror: The Ku Klux Klan Conspiracy and Southern Reconstruction, and claimed that the office that Pike allegedly held in the KKK was not mentioned in "The Prescript", the Klan constitution. However, the office of Grand Dragon, which Davis claims Pike once held, is explicitly mentioned in the 1867 Klan constitution. At the same time, Trelease noted that "Pike may well have affiliated with the Klan." As evidence, Trelease notes that Pike "was intrigued by secret societies and rituals" and "sympathized with the Klan's stated objectives."

A 1997 biography of Pike by Walter Lee Brown asserts that Pike was not a member of the Klan and Brown found "no contemporary, nor no reliable late evidence that Pike ever joined the Klan." Brown claims the work of Fleming, Davis and Horn are "unreliable histories", but offers no further evidence other than citing Trelease, which, in Brown's interpretation "casts doubt on Pike's membership."

== Selected books ==
- Indo-Aryan Deities and Worship as Contained in the Rig-Veda (1872)
- Morals and Dogma of the Ancient and Accepted Scottish Rite (1872)
- Book of the Words (1874)
- Reprints of Old Rituals (1879)
- Esoterika (1887)

== See also ==
- List of Arkansas adjutants general
- List of Confederate States Army generals
- List of Freemasons
- List of people from Boston
- List of people from Little Rock, Arkansas

== Footnotes ==
Military offices
Preceded by Colonel S. H. Hempstead	Adjutant General of Arkansas; 1845–1846	Succeeded by Colonel Solon Borland
Legal offices
Preceded by Hulbert F. Fairchild	Associate Justice of the Arkansas Supreme Court; In exile 1864–1865	Succeeded by Charles A. Harper
