= Benjamin Penhallow Shillaber =

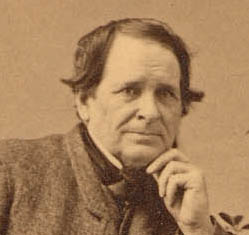
Benjamin Penhallow Shillaber

Benjamin Penhallow Shillaber (July 12, 1814 – November 25, 1890) was an American printer, editor, and humorist. He often wrote under the guise of his fictional character Mrs. Partington.

== Biography ==
Shillaber was born in Portsmouth, New Hampshire in 1814 and began work in a printing office in 1830. He moved to Boston in the 1830s, and then became an editor with the Boston Daily Post and Saturday Evening Gazette. For the Post, Shillaber introduced his character Mrs. Ruth Partington, the American version of Mrs. Malaprop, which he would reuse frequently throughout his career.

In 1851, Shillaber became the founding editor of The Carpet-Bag with his business partner Charles G. Halpine. The Boston-based humor magazine was one of the country's first comic publications. Though it would only survive for two years, it soon earned a national reputation and enticed contributions from humorist like George Derby and others, as well as serious writers who used pseudonyms like Enoch Fitzwhistle, Peter Snooks, and John P. Squibob. The May 1, 1852, issue ran a short article titled "The Dandy Frightening the Squatter" by a 16-year old Samuel L. Clemens, later known by the name Mark Twain. Shillaber's character of Ike Partington, Mrs. Partington's nephew, may have influenced Twain's title character in The Adventures of Tom Sawyer. Twain more explicitly refers to Mrs. Partington in his book Roughing It.

He died in Chelsea, Massachusetts.

== Works ==
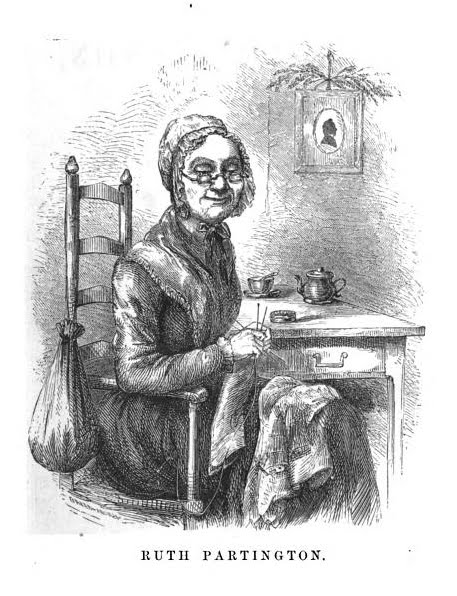
Illustration of Mrs. Partington, c. 1858

- Rhymes With Reason and Without (1854)
- Life and Sayings of Mrs. Partington (1854)
- Knitting-Work: A Web of Many Textures, Wrought by Ruth Partington (1859)
- Partingtonian Patchwork (1873)
- Ike and his Friends (1879)
- Wide-swath, Embracing Lines in Pleasant Places: And Other Rhymes Wise and Otherwise (1882)
