= Corinne Le Poulain =

French actress

Corrine Le Poulin
- Born: 26 May 1948; Neuilly-sur-Seine
- Died: 10 February 2015 (aged 66); Paris
- Occupation: Actress

Corinne Le Poulain (26 May 1948 – 10 February 2015) was a French actress. Niece of actor Jean Le Poulain, she seduced Jean Marais on-screen in the film La Provocation (1969). She was famous as Sally in TV-series Sam & Sally. She was a great success during the 1970s with based-on-novel-TV-series Splendeurs et misères des courtisanes. She made a comeback as Claude Jade's lesbian love Gloria in Jean-Pierre Mocky's Bonsoir. From 2005, she played in TV-series Plus belle la vie.

== Theatre ==
- 1961: Eight Women by Robert Thomas, directed by Jean Le Poulain, Théâtre Édouard VII, Théâtre des Bouffes-Parisiens in 1962
- 1967: Forty Carats, by Pierre Barillet and Jean-Pierre Gredy, directed by Jacques Charon, Théâtre de la Madeleine
- 1971: Le Canard à l'orange as Patty Pat, with Jean Poiret
- 1971: De Doux Dingues by Joseph Carole with Maria Pacôme and Jean Le Poulain
- 1972: Oscar by Claude Magnier, directed by Pierre Mondy, Théâtre du Palais-Royal
- 1983: Le Dindon by Georges Feydeau, directed by Jean Meyer, Théâtre des Célestins
- 1984: Gigi by Colette, directed by Jean Meyer, Théâtre des Célestins
- 1984: Brocéliande by Henry de Montherlant, directed by Jean Meyer, Théâtre des Célestins
- 1984: Les Précieuses ridicules by Molière, directed by Jean Meyer, Théâtre des Célestins
- 1985: Topaze by Marcel Pagnol, directed by Jean Meyer, Théâtre des Célestins
- 1985: Gigi by Colette, directed by Jean Meyer, Théâtre des Nouveautés
- 1989: L'Illusionniste by Sacha Guitry, directed by Jean-Luc Moreau, Théâtre des Bouffes-Parisiens
- 1991: Décibel by Julien Vartet, directed by Gérard Savoisien, Théâtre Édouard VII
- 1993: Durant avec un T by Julien Vartet, directed by Daniel Colas, Théâtre Édouard VII
- 1994: Décibel by Julien Vartet, directed by Gérard Savoisien, Théâtre Édouard VII
- 1997: Un mariage pour trois by Georges Feydeau, directed by Anthony Walkers, Théâtre du Gymnase Marie Bell
- 2004: Patate by Marcel Achard, directed by Bernard Menez, Théâtre Daunou
- 2009: L'Amour foot by Robert Lamoureux, directed by Francis Joffo
- 2010: La berlue, by Jean-Jacques Bricaire and Maurice Lasaygues, directed by Michel Jeffrault
- 2011–2012: Le nouveau testament, by Sacha Guitry, directed by Isabelle Ratier

== Selected filmography ==
- 1966: Au théâtre ce soir: Les portes claquent by Michel Fermaud, directed by Christian-Gérard, produced by Pierre Sabbagh, Théâtre Marigny: Danièle
- 1967: Mary de Cork by Maurice Cazeneuve, Varai
- 1968: Au théâtre ce soir: Azaïs by Georges Berr et Louis Verneuil, directed by Jean Le Poulain, produced by Pierre Sabbagh, Théâtre Marigny, Suzanne
- 1968: Six chevaux bleus by Philippe Joulia, television series, 9 episodes
- 1969: La Provocation by André Charpak (Isabelle)
- 1969: Un jeune couple by René Gainville, (Janine)
- 1970: La Grande Java by Philippe Clair
- 1971: Au théâtre ce soir: De doux dingues by Joseph Carole, directed by Jean Le Poulain, produced by Georges Folgoas, Théâtre Marigny (Marie)
- 1971: Au théâtre ce soir: Huit Femmes by Robert Thomas, directed by Jean Le Poulain, produced by Pierre Sabbagh, Théâtre Marigny (Suzon, the elder sister)
- 1972: Absences répétées by Guy Gilles, (Guy's wife)
- 1973: Tout le monde peut s'appeler moi by Claude Deflandre, television film
- 1973: Les Anges by Jean Desvilles
- 1973: Poof by Lazare Iglésis, television film, (Isabelle)
- 1974: À trois temps by Jean Kerchbron
- 1974: Arsène Lupin by Jean-Pierre Desagnat, one episode: Les huit coups de l'horloge, (Hortense)
- 1974: Le deuil sied à Electre (trilogy by Eugène O'Neill), produced by Maurice Cazeneuve: Hazel
- 1975: Splendeurs et misères des courtisanes, soap opera of six 90-minute episodes, by Maurice Cazeneuve after a story by Honoré de Balzac: Esther Gobseck
- 1975: Marie-Antoinette by Guy Lefranc, television series, four episodes, (Mme de Polignac)
- 1975: La missione del mandrillo by Guido Zurli
- 1976: Le Siècle des lumières by Claude Brulé, television film (Gabrielle)
- 1977: Drôles de zèbres by Guy Lux, (Solange)
- 1978: Voltaire, television series also known as Ce diable de homme by Marcel Camus
- 1978: Sam et Sally, television series (six episodes in 1978), by Robert Pouret, Nicolas Ribowski and Jean Girault, (Sally)
- 1979: Emmenez-moi au théâtre, televised stageplay: Le Canard à l'orange by André Flédérick, (Patricia Forsyth)
- 1980: Le Cocu magnifique (television film) by Marlène Bertin, television film, (Stella)
- 1981: Les Gaietés de la correctionnelle, television series, one episode: Le divorce nostalgique by Marlène Bertin, (Bernadette Goulot)
- 1981: La Vie des autres (episode "L'autre femme"), television series de Gérard Clément, (Michèle)
- 1981: À nous de jouer by André Flédérick, television film, (Solange)
- 1981: Les Visiteurs de Noël, television programme, (La Sorcière)
- 1983: Les amours romantiques, one episode: Les prétendus by Josée Dayan
- 1983: L'Homme de la nuit by Juan Luis Buñuel: television series, (Michèle)
- 1984: Dernier Banco by Claude de Givray, television film, (Madame Follenfant)
- 1987: Je tue à la campagne by Josée Dayan, television film, (Myriam)
- 1987: Gigi by Jeannette Hubert
- 1989: Une fille by Ève by Alexandre Astruc, television film, (Florine)
- 1991: Le second voyage by Jean-Jacques Goron
- 1991: Poison by amour by Hugues de Laugardière, television film, (Elisabeth)
- 1994: Décibel by Philippe Ducrest
- 1994: Bonsoir by Jean-Pierre Mocky, (Gloria)
- 1994: Julie Lescaut by Josée Dayan, television series, in episode Ville haute, Ville basse, (Gymnast)
- 1997: Navarro, Verdict by Nicolas Ribowski, (Mady)
- 2005: Plus belle la vie, television short, (Solange Chaumette)
- 2005: Navarro, Double meurtre by Édouard Molinaro, (Madame Dassonville)
- 2009: Père et Maire, one episode: La passion de Marie-France by Pascal Heylbroeck
