= Jeanne Moreau =

French actress, singer, screenwriter, director and socialite (1928–2017)

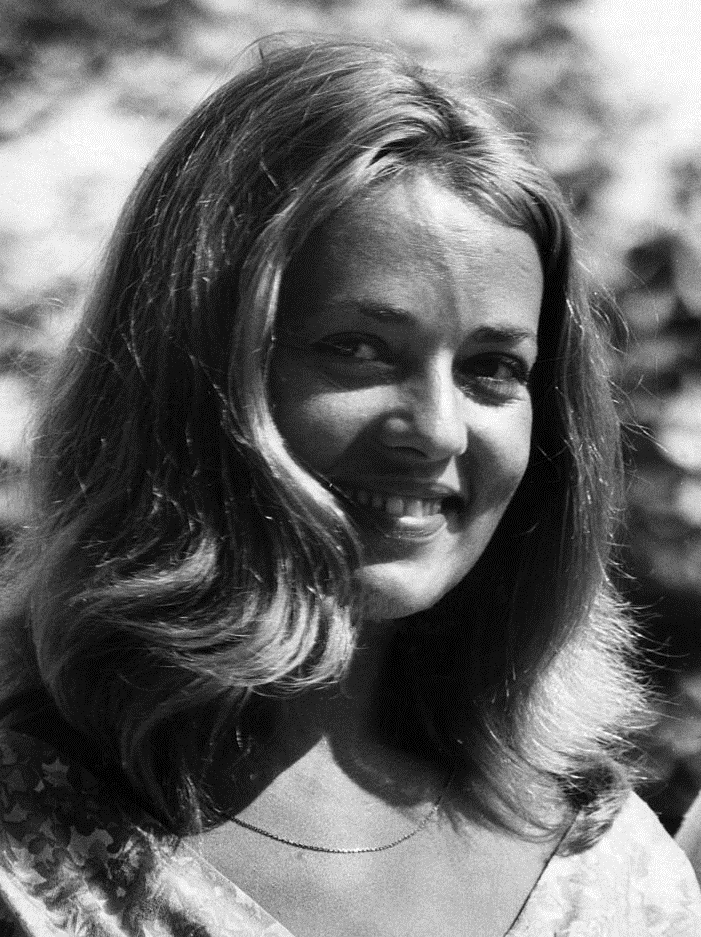
- Moreau in 1958
- Born: 23 January 1928; Paris, France
- Died: 31 July 2017 (aged 89); Paris, France
- Resting place: Montmartre Cemetery, Paris
- Education: Conservatoire de Paris
- Occupations: Actress; screenwriter; film director
- Years active: 1947–2015
- Spouses: Jean-Louis Richard (m. 1949; div. 1951) William Friedkin (m. 1977; div. 1979)
- Children: 1

Jeanne Moreau (French: [ʒan mɔʁo]; 23 January 1928 – 31 July 2017) was a French actress, singer, screenwriter, director, and socialite. She made her theatrical debut in 1947, and established herself as one of the leading actresses of the Comédie-Française.

Moreau began playing small roles in films in 1949, later achieving prominence with a starring role in Louis Malle's Elevator to the Gallows (1958). She was most prolific during the 1960s, winning the Cannes Film Festival Award for Best Actress for Seven Days... Seven Nights (1960) and the BAFTA Award for Best Foreign Actress for Viva Maria! (1965), with additional prominent roles in La Notte (1961), Jules et Jim (1962), La baie des anges (1963), Le journal d'une femme de chambre (1964) and Mademoiselle (1966).

Moreau worked as a director on several films beginning with 1976's Lumière. She continued to act into the 2010s, winning the César Award for Best Actress for The Old Lady Who Walked in the Sea (1992) and receiving several lifetime achievement awards, including a BAFTA Fellowship in 1996, a Cannes Golden Palm in 2003, and another César Award in 2008. Her collaborator and friend Orson Welles called her "the greatest actress in the world".

== Early life and education ==
Moreau was born in Paris, the daughter of Katherine (née Buckley), a dancer who performed at the Folies Bergère (d. 1990), and Anatole-Désiré Moreau, a restaurateur (d. 1975). Moreau's father was French; her mother was English, a native of Oldham, Lancashire, England and of part Irish descent. Moreau's father was Catholic and her mother, originally a Protestant, converted to Catholicism upon marriage. When Jeanne was a young girl, "the family moved south to Vichy, spending vacations at the paternal ancestral village of Mazirat, a town of 30 houses in a valley in the Allier. "It was wonderful there", Moreau said. "Every tombstone in the cemetery was for a Moreau."

During World War II, the family was split, and Moreau lived with her mother in Paris. Moreau ultimately lost interest in school and, at age 16, after attending a performance of Jean Anouilh's Antigone, found her calling as an actress. She later studied at the Conservatoire de Paris. Her parents separated permanently while Moreau was at the conservatory and her mother, "after 24 difficult years in France, returned to England with Jeanne's sister, Michelle."

== Career ==
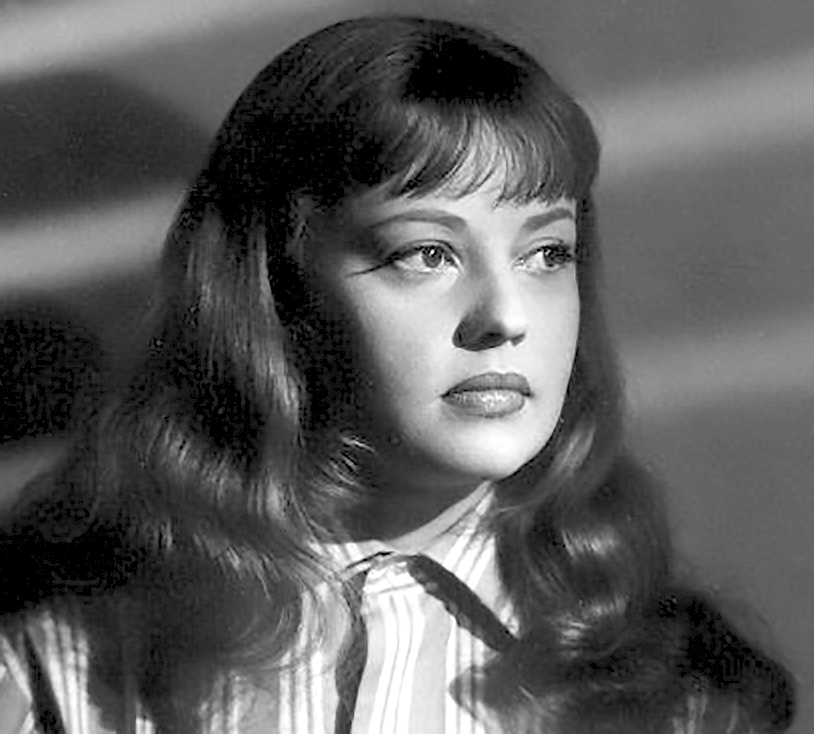
Moreau in 1952

In 1947, Moreau made her theatrical debut at the Avignon Festival. She debuted at the Comédie-Française in Ivan Turgenev's A Month in the Country and, by her 20s, was already one of the leading actresses in the theatre's troupe. After 1949, she began appearing in films with small parts but continued primarily active in the theatre for several years — a year at the Théâtre National Populaire opposite among others Gérard Philipe and Robert Hirsch, then a breakout two years in dual roles in The Dazzling Hour by Anna Bonacci, then Jean Cocteau's La Machine Infernale and others before another two-year run, this time in Shaw's Pygmalion. From the late 1950s, after appearing in several successful films, she began to work with the emerging generation of French film-makers. Elevator to the Gallows (1958) with first-time director Louis Malle was followed by Malle's The Lovers (Les Amants, 1959).

Moreau went on to work with many of the best known New Wave and avant-garde directors. François Truffaut's New Wave film Jules et Jim (1962), her biggest success internationally, is centered on her magnetic starring role. She also worked with a number of other notable directors such as Michelangelo Antonioni (La Notte and Beyond the Clouds), Orson Welles (The Trial, Chimes at Midnight and The Immortal Story), Luis Buñuel (Diary of a Chambermaid), Elia Kazan (The Last Tycoon), Rainer Werner Fassbinder (Querelle), Wim Wenders (Until the End of the World), Carl Foreman (Champion and The Victors), and Manoel de Oliveira (Gebo et l'Ombre).

In 1983, she was head of the jury at the 33rd Berlin International Film Festival. In 2005, she was awarded with the Stanislavsky Award at the 27th Moscow International Film Festival.

Moreau was also a vocalist. She released several albums and once performed with Frank Sinatra at Carnegie Hall in 1984. In addition to acting, Moreau worked behind the camera as a writer, director and producer. Her accomplishments were a subject in the film Calling the Shots (1988) by Janis Cole and Holly Dale. She appeared in Rosa von Praunheim's film Fassbinder's Women (2000).

== Personal life ==
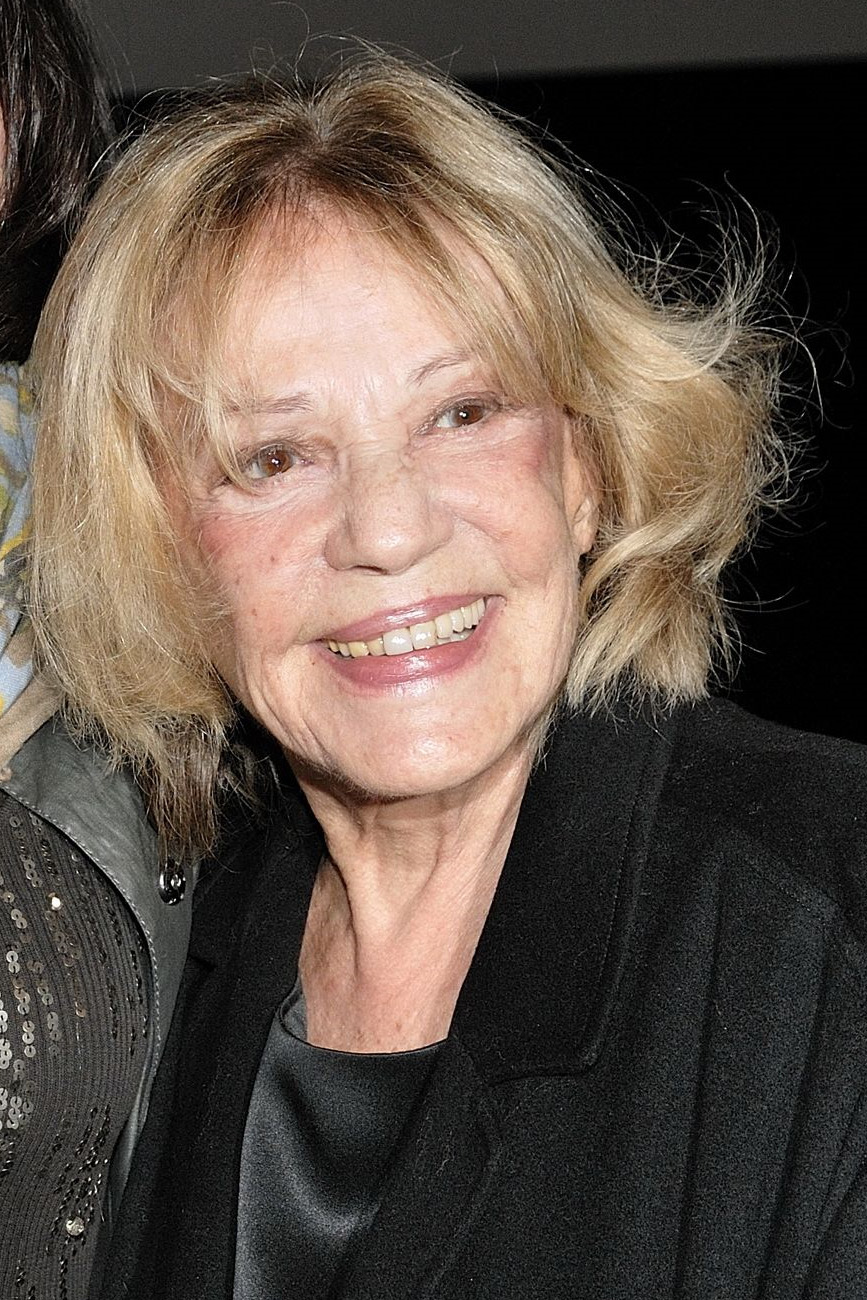
Moreau in 2009

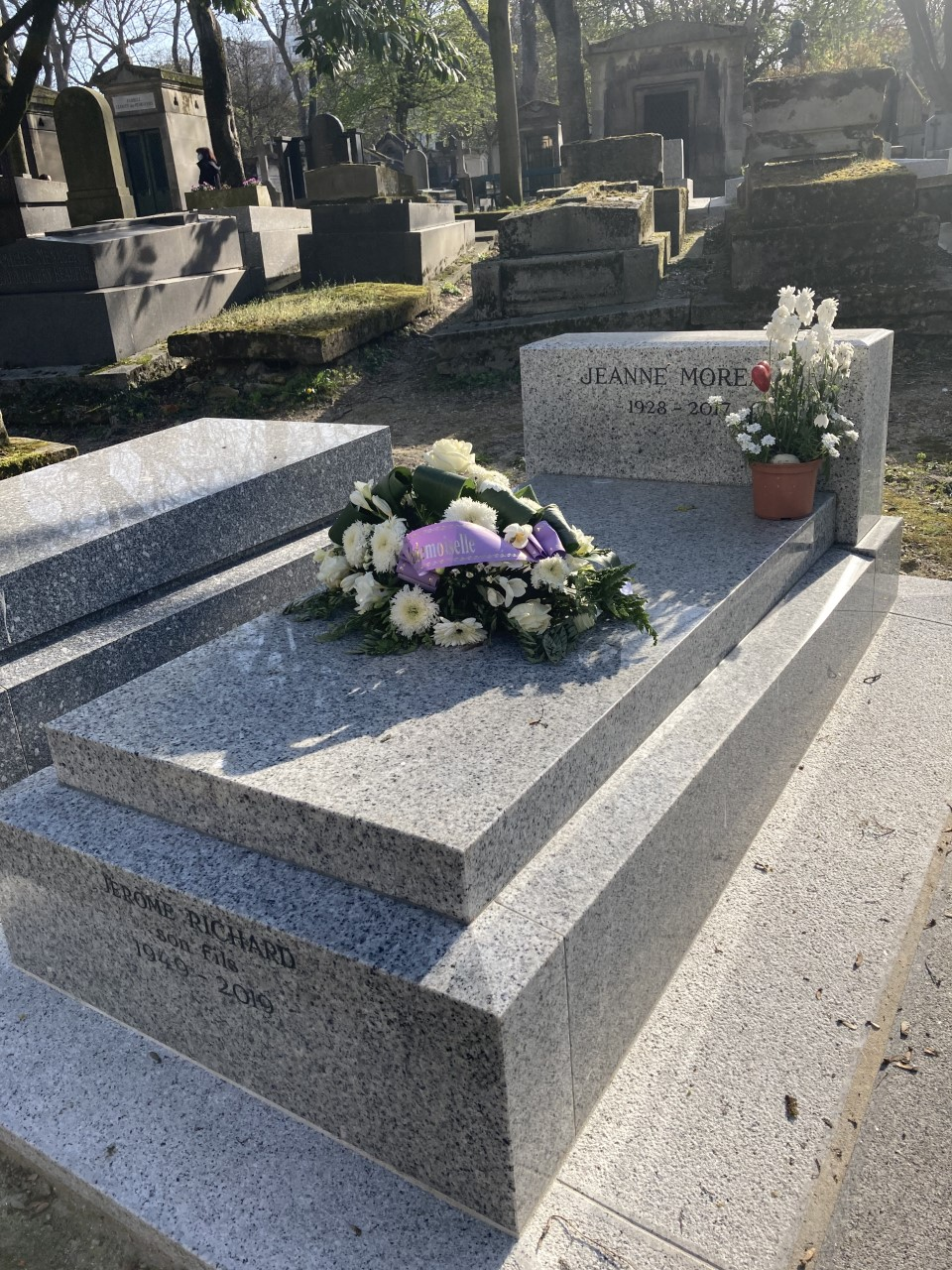
Jeanne Moreau's grave in Montmartre Cemetery

Throughout her life, Moreau maintained friendships with prominent writers such as Jean Cocteau, Jean Genet, Henry Miller and Marguerite Duras (an interview with Moreau is included in Duras's book Outside: Selected Writings). She formerly was married to Jean-Louis Richard (1949–1964, separated in 1951), and then to American film director William Friedkin (1977–1979). She and Richard had a son, Jérôme. Director Tony Richardson left his wife Vanessa Redgrave for her in 1967, but they never married. She also had relationships with directors Louis Malle and François Truffaut, fashion designer Pierre Cardin, and the Greek actor/playboy Theodoros Roubanis.

In 1971, Moreau was a signatory of the Manifesto of the 343 which publicly announced that she had obtained an illegal abortion.

Moreau was a close friend of Sharon Stone, who presented a 1998 American Academy of Motion Pictures life tribute to Moreau at the Samuel Goldwyn Theater, academy headquarters, in Beverly Hills. Orson Welles called Moreau "the greatest actress in the world", and she remained one of France's most accomplished actresses.

In 2009, Moreau signed a petition in support of director Roman Polanski, who had been detained while traveling to a film festival in relation to his 1977 sexual abuse charges, which the petition argued would undermine the tradition of film festivals as a place for works to be shown "freely and safely", and that arresting filmmakers traveling to neutral countries could open the door "for actions of which no-one can know the effects".

Moreau died on 31 July 2017 at her home in Paris at the age of 89. Her body was discovered by her cleaning maid. Shortly before her death, she had said she felt "abandoned" because she could not act anymore.

== Filmography ==
=== Actress ===
Year	Title	Role	Director	Notes
1949	Last Love	Michèle	Jean Stelli	
1950	Murders	Martine Annequin	Richard Pottier	
1950	Pigalle-Saint-Germain-des-Prés	La môme Pâquerette	André Berthomieu	
1952	The Man in My Life	Suzanne Dubreuil	Guy Lefranc	
1952	It Is Midnight, Doctor Schweitzer	Marie Winter	André Haguet	
1953	Dortoir des grandes	Julie	Henri Decoin	
1953	Julietta	Rosie Facibey	Marc Allégret	
1954	Touchez pas au grisbi	Josy	Jacques Becker	
1954	Les Intrigantes	Mona Rémi	Henri Decoin	
1954	Secrets d'alcôve	Jeanne Plisson	Various directors	(segment "Billet de logement, Le")
1954	Queen Margot	Margaret of Valois	Jean Dréville	
1955	Les Hommes en blanc	Marianne Déjazet	Ralph Habib	
1955	M'sieur la Caille	Fernande	André Pergament	
1955	Gas-Oil	Alice	Gilles Grangier	
1956	The Wages of Sin	Angèle Ribot	Denys de la Patellière	
1957	Until the Last One	Gina	Pierre Billon	
1957	The She-Wolves	Agnès Vanaux	Luis Saslavsky	
1957	The Strange Mr. Steve	Florence	Raymond Bailly	
1957	Three Days to Live	Jeanne Fortin	Gilles Grangier	
1958	Not Delivered	Jacqueline Tourieu	Gilles Grangier	
1958	Ascenseur pour l'échafaud	Florence Carala	Louis Malle	
1958	Back to the Wall	Gloria Decrey	Édouard Molinaro	
1958	Les amants	Jeanne Tournier	Louis Malle	
1959	The 400 Blows	Woman with Dog	François Truffaut	cameo appearance
1959	Les liaisons dangereuses	Juliette de Merteuil	Roger Vadim	
1960	Five Branded Women	Ljuba	Martin Ritt	
1960	Moderato Cantabile	Anne Desbarèdes	Peter Brook	Cannes Film Festival Award for Best Actress
1960	Dialogue of the Carmelites	Mère Marie de l'Incarnation	Philippe Agostini	
1961	La Notte	Lidia Pontano	Michelangelo Antonioni	
1961	A Woman Is a Woman	Woman in Bar	Jean-Luc Godard	Uncredited, discussing Jules et Jim
1962	Jules et Jim	Catherine	François Truffaut	
1962	Eva	Eva Olivier	Joseph Losey	
1962	The Trial	Miss Burstner	Orson Welles	
1963	Bay of Angels	Jacqueline "Jackie" Demaistre	Jacques Demy	
1963	The Fire Within (Le feu follet)	Eva	Louis Malle	
1963	Banana Peel (Peau de banane)	Cathy	Marcel Ophüls	
1963	The Victors	the French lady	Carl Foreman	
1964	Diary of a Chambermaid	Célestine	Luis Buñuel	
1964	The Train	Christine	John Frankenheimer	
1964	The Yellow Rolls-Royce	Eloise, Marchioness of Frinton	Anthony Asquith	
1964	Mata Hari, Agent H21	Mata Hari	Jean-Louis Richard	
1965	Viva Maria!	Maria I	Louis Malle	
1965	Chimes at Midnight	Doll Tearsheet	Orson Welles	
1966	Mademoiselle	"Mademoiselle"	Tony Richardson	
1967	The Oldest Profession	Mimi Guillotine	Philippe de Broca	(segment "Mademoiselle Mimi")
1967	The Sailor from Gibraltar	Anna	Tony Richardson	
1968	The Bride Wore Black	Julie Kohler	François Truffaut	
1968	The Immortal Story	Virginie Ducrot	Orson Welles	TV movie
1968	Great Catherine	Catherine	Gordon Flemyng	
1969	Le Corps de Diane	Diane Vallier	Jean-Louis Richard	
1970	Monte Walsh	Martine Bernard	William A. Fraker	
1970	The Little Theatre of Jean Renoir	the singer	Jean Renoir	TV movie, (segment "Quand l'amour meurt")
1970	The Deep	Ruth Warriner	Orson Welles	Filming was unfinished
1970	Alex in Wonderland	Herself	Paul Mazursky	
1971	Countdown to Vengeance	Madeleine St Rose	Roger Pigaut	
1972	Chère Louise	Louise	Philippe de Broca	
1972	L'humeur vagabonde	Myriam Bingeot	Édouard Luntz	
1972	Nathalie Granger	"the other woman"	Marguerite Duras	
1972	Repeated Absences	nostalgie	Guy Gilles	Voice
1973	Joanna Francesa	Joana	Cacá Diegues	
1974	I Love You (1974 film)	Elisa Boussac	Pierre Duceppe	
1974	Les Valseuses	Jeanne Pirolle	Bertrand Blier	
1974	Creezy	Renee Vibert	Pierre Granier-Deferre	
1975	The Garden That Tilts	Maria	Guy Gilles	
1975	Hu-Man	Sylvana	Jérôme Laperrousaz	
1976	Lumière	Sarah Dedieu	Jeanne Moreau	
1976	Monsieur Klein	Florence	Joseph Losey	
1976	The Last Tycoon	Didi	Elia Kazan	
1979	The Adolescent	La narratrice	Jeanne Moreau	Voice, Uncredited
1981	Heat of Desire	Hélène, la mère de Caroline	Luc Béraud	
1981	Your Ticket Is No Longer Valid	Lili Marlene	George Kaczender	
1982	A Thousand Billion Dollars	Mme Benoît-Lambert	Henri Verneuil	
1982	Querelle	Lysiane	Rainer Werner Fassbinder	
1982	La Truite	Lou Rambert	Joseph Losey	
1985	Vicious Circle	Ines	TV play	
1986	The Paltoquet	The Brothel-Keeper	Michel Deville	
1986	Sauve-toi, Lola	Marie-Aude Schneider	Michel Drach	
1986–1987	Le Tiroir secret	Vivi	(different directors)	2 episodes
1987	The Miracle	Sabine	Jean-Pierre Mocky	
1987	Remake	Herself	Ansano Giannarelli	
1989	Jour après jour (1989 film)	Janine Weisman	Alain Attal	
1990	La Femme Nikita	Amande	Luc Besson	
1990	Alberto Express	the Baroness	Arthur Joffé	
1990	La Femme fardée	Le Doria	José Pinheiro	
1991	Anna Karamazoff	the Lady	Rustam Khamdamov	
1991	To meteoro vima tou pelargou	the Lady	Theo Angelopoulos	
1991	The Old Lady Who Walked in the Sea	Lady M	Laurent Heynemann	
1991	Until the End of the World	Edith Farber	Wim Wenders	
1992	The Lover	Narrator	Jean-Jacques Annaud	Voice
1992	Map of the Human Heart	Sister Banville	Vincent Ward	
1992	La Nuit de l'océan	Hélène Sauveterre	Antoine Perset	
1992	The Absence	the writer's wife	Peter Handke	
1992	À demain	Tete	Didier Martiny	
1993	The Clothes in the Wardrobe	Lili	Waris Hussein	Titled The Summer House in the U.S.
1993	Je m'appelle Victor	Rose	Guy Jacques	
1993	Screen One	Angelique	Charles Sturridge	Episode: A Foreign Field
1995	One Hundred and One Nights	La première ex-épouse de M. Cinéma	Agnès Varda	
1995	Catherine the Great	Empress Elizabeth Petrovna	Marvin J. Chomsky	
1995	Beyond the Clouds	a Lady	Michelangelo Antonioni and Wim Wenders	
1996	I Love You, I Love You Not	Nana	Billy Hopkins	
1996	The Proprietor	Adrienne Mark	Ismail Merchant	
1997	Amour et confusions	Libra	Patrick Braoudé	
1997	Witch Way Love	Eglantine	René Manzor	
1998	Ever After	Grande Dame	Andy Tennant	
1999	Balzac	Charlotte-Laure de Balzac	Josée Dayan	TV movie
2000	The Prince's Manuscript	Alessandra Wolf (Licy)	Roberto Andò	
2000	Les Misérables	Mere Innocente	Josée Dayan	4 episodes
2001	Lisa	Lisa (old)	Pierre Grimblat	
2001	That Love	Marguerite Duras	Josée Dayan	
2003	Love Actually	Lady at Marseilles Airport	Richard Curtis	Uncredited
2003	Les Parents terribles	Tante Leo	Josée Dayan	
2005	Akoibon	Madame Paule	Édouard Baer	
2005	Time to Leave	Laura	François Ozon	
2005	Go West	Novinar	Ahmed Imamović	
2005	Les Rois maudits	Mahaut, Countess of Artois	Josée Dayan	5 episodes
2006	Roméo et Juliette	Laurence	Yves Desgagnés	
2007	Chacun son cinéma	The old woman / Herself	Various directors	(segment "Trois Minutes")
2007	Désengagement	Françoise	Amos Gitai	
2008	One Day You'll Understand	Rivka	Amos Gitai	
2008	Everywhere at Once	Narrator	Holly Fisher; Peter Lindbergh	
2009	Carmel		Amos Gitai	Voice
2009	Face	Jeanne	Ming-liang Tsai	
2009	La guerre des fils de la lumière contre les fils des ténèbres		Amos Gitai	
2009	Kérity, la maison des contes	Aunt Eleanor	Dominique Monfery	Voice
2012	Une estonienne à Paris	Frida	Ilmar Raag	
2012	Gebo et l'Ombre	Candidinha	Manoel de Oliveira	
2015	Thanks To My Friends	La grand-mère de Thibault	Alex Lutz	(final film role)

=== Director ===
- Lumière (1976)
- L'Adolescente (1979)
- Lillian Gish (1983, TV documentary)

== Awards and nominations ==
=== Films ===
Year	Group	Award	Film	Result
2008	César Awards	Honorary César	Lifetime achievement	Won
2005	Moscow International Film Festival	Stanislavsky Award	Lifetime achievement	Won
2003	Cannes Film Festival	Honorary Golden Palm	Lifetime achievement	Won
2003	Taormina International Film Festival	Taormina Arte Award	Lifetime achievement	Won
2001	Busan International Film Festival	Hand Printing (tribute)	Lifetime achievement	Won
2000	Berlin International Film Festival	Honorary Golden Bear	Lifetime achievement	Won
1999	Hamptons International Film Festival	Distinguished Achievement Award	Lifetime achievement	Won
1999	Créteil International Women's Film Festival	Homage	Lifetime achievement	Won
1998	Academy of Motion Picture Arts and Sciences	Tribute	Lifetime achievement	Won
1997	European Film Awards	Life Achievement Award	Lifetime achievement	Won
1997	San Sebastián International Film Festival	Donostia Lifetime Achievement Award	Lifetime achievement	Won
1996	BAFTA Awards	Academy Fellowship	Lifetime achievement	Won
1995	César Awards	Honorary César	Lifetime achievement	Won
1994	Women in Film Crystal Award	International Award	Lifetime achievement	Won
1992	Venice Film Festival	Career Golden Lion	Lifetime achievement	Won
1992	César Awards	Best Actress	The Old Lady Who Walked in the Sea	Won
1988	César Awards	Best Actress	Le Miraculé	Nominated
1987	César Awards	Best Supporting Actress	Le Paltoquet	Nominated
1984	Razzie Awards	Golden Raspberry Award for Worst Original Song	Querelle – song: "Young and Joyful Bandit"	Nominated
1979	Berlin International Film Festival	Golden Bear	L'adolescente	Nominated
1979	Chicago International Film Festival	Gold Hugo	L'adolescente	Nominated
1976	Chicago International Film Festival	Gold Hugo	Lumière	Nominated
1976	Taormina International Film Festival	Golden Charybdis	Lumière	Nominated
1967	BAFTA Awards	Best Foreign Actress	Viva Maria!	Won
1964	Karlovy Vary International Film Festival	Best Actress	Diary of a Chambermaid	Won
1963	BAFTA Awards	Best Foreign Actress	Jules et Jim	Nominated
1962	Jussi Awards	Diploma of Merit – Foreign Actress	La notte	Won
1961	Fotogramas de Plata	Best Foreign Performer	Le dialogue des Carmélites	Won
1960	Cannes Film Festival	Best Actress	Moderato cantabile	Won
1958	Venice Film Festival	Best Actress	Les amants	Won

=== Theater ===
Year	Group	Award	Play	Result
1988	Molière Awards	Best Actress	Le Récit de la servante Zerline	Won
