= La Provocation =

- Directed by: André Charpak
- Written by: André Charpak; Jean Verdun
- Produced by: Israel Motion Picture Studios, Jeune Cinema, Paris
- Starring: Jean Marais; Maria Schell
- Music by: Dov Seltzer
- Release date: 11 February 1970 (France)
- Running time: 90 minutes
- Countries: Israel; France; West Germany
- Language: French
- Box office: 91,408 admissions (France)

La Provocation (English: The Provocation) is a German-language drama film from 1970. It was directed by André Charpak, written by André Charpak and Jean Verdun, starring Jean Marais and Maria Schell.

== Cast ==
- Jean Marais as Christian
- Maria Schell as Jeanne
- Corinne Le Poulain as Isabelle
- Veit Relin as Bertrand
- André Charpak as André
- Evelyne Dassas as Françoise
- Gerald Robar
