= Scottish Rite =

Rite of Freemasonry

The double-headed eagle, the symbol most commonly associated with the Scottish Rite

The Ancient and Accepted Scottish Rite of Freemasonry is a rite within the broader context of Freemasonry. It is the most widely practiced Rite in the world. In some parts of the world, and in the Droit Humain, it is a concordant body and oversees all degrees from the 1st to 33rd degrees, while in other areas it is deemed an appendant body with a Supreme Council that oversees the 4th to 33rd degrees.

It is most commonly referred to as the Scottish Rite. Sometimes, as in England and Australia, it is called the Rose Croix, though this is just one of its degrees, and is not to be confused with other Masonic related Rosicrucian societies such as the Societas Rosicruciana in Anglia. Its name may vary slightly in various jurisdictions and constitutions. For example, the English and Irish Constitutions omit the word Scottish.

Master Masons from other rites may, in some countries, join the Scottish Rite's upper degrees starting from the 4th degree due to its popularity. This Rite builds upon the ethical teachings and philosophy offered in the Craft (or Blue) Lodge through dramatic presentations of its individual degrees. The term "Blue Lodge" refers to the first three degrees of Masonry, regardless of the Rite being practiced. In the Scottish Rite system, the first three degrees are considered “Blue Lodge degrees” while the subsequent degrees are sometimes deemed “Red Lodge degrees”.

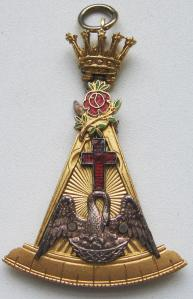
Scottish Rite jewel 18°

== History ==
=== Scots Master Degree ===
There are records of lodges conferring the degree of "Scots Master" or "Scotch Master" as early as 1733. A lodge at the Devil (Tavern), Temple Bar in London is the earliest such lodge on record. Other lodges include a lodge at Bath in 1735, and the French lodge, St. George de l'Observance No. 49 at Covent Garden in 1736. The references to these few occasions indicate that these were special meetings held for the purpose of performing unusual ceremonies, probably by visiting Freemasons. The Copiale cipher, dating from the 1740s to 1760s says, "The rank of a Scottish master is an entirely new invention..."

=== Myth of Jacobite origins ===
French writers Jean-Marie Ragon (1781–1862) and Emmanuel Rebold, in their Masonic histories, first claimed that the high degrees were created and practiced in Lodge Canongate Kilwinning at Edinburgh, which is entirely false.

=== Estienne Morin ===
A French trader, by the name of Estienne Morin, had been involved in high-degree Masonry in Bordeaux since 1744 and, in 1747, founded an "Écossais" lodge (Scottish Lodge) in the city of Le Cap Français, on the north coast of the French colony of Saint-Domingue, now Haiti. Over the next decade, high-degree Freemasonry was carried by French men to other cities in the Western hemisphere. The high-degree lodge at Bordeaux warranted or recognized seven Écossais lodges there.

In Paris in the year 1761, a patent was issued to Estienne Morin, dated 27 August, creating him "Grand Inspector for all parts of the New World". This Patent was signed by officials of the Grand Lodge at Paris and appears to have originally granted him power over the craft lodges only, and not over the high, or "Écossais", degree lodges. Later copies of this Patent appear to have been embellished, probably by Morin, to improve his position over the high-degree lodges in the West Indies.

Morin returned to the West Indies in 1762 or 1763, to Saint-Domingue. Based on his new Patent, he assumed powers to constitute lodges of all degrees, spreading the high degrees throughout the West Indies and North America. Morin stayed in Saint-Domingue until 1766, when he moved to Jamaica. At Kingston, Jamaica, in 1770, Morin created a "Grand Chapter" of his new Rite, the Grand Council of Jamaica. Morin died in 1771 and was buried in Kingston.

=== Rite of 25 Degrees ===
Early writers long believed that a "Rite of Perfection" consisting of 25 degrees, itself the predecessor of the Scottish Rite, had been formed in Paris by a high-degree council calling itself "The Council of Emperors of the East and West". The title "Rite of Perfection" first appeared in the Preface to the "Grand Constitutions of 1786", the authority for which is now known to be faulty. The highest degree in this rite was the "Sublime Prince of the Royal Secret".

It is now generally accepted that this Rite of twenty-five degrees was compiled by Estienne Morin and is more properly called "The Rite of the Royal Secret", or "Morin's Rite".

However, it was known as "The Order of Prince of the Royal Secret" by the founders of the Scottish Rite, who mentioned it in their "Circular throughout the two Hemispheres" or "Manifesto", issued on December 4, 1802.

=== Henry Andrew Francken and his manuscripts ===
Henry Andrew Francken, a naturalized French subject born as Hendrick Andriese Franken of Dutch origin, was most important in assisting Morin in spreading the degrees in the New World. Morin appointed him Deputy Grand Inspector General (DGIG) as one of his first acts after returning to the West Indies. Francken worked closely with Morin and, in 1771, produced a manuscript book giving the rituals for the 15th through the 25th degrees. Francken produced at least four such manuscripts. In addition to the 1771 manuscript, there is a second which can be dated to 1783; a third manuscript, of uncertain date, written in Francken's handwriting, with the rituals 4–25°, which was found in the archives of the Provincial Grand Lodge of Lancashire in Liverpool in approximately 1984; and a fourth, again of uncertain date, with rituals 4–24°, which was known to have been given by H. J. Whymper to the District Grand Lodge of the Punjab and rediscovered about 2010. Additionally, there is a French manuscript dating from 1790 to 1800 which contains the 25 degrees of the Order of the Royal Secret with additional detail, as well as three other Hauts Grades rituals; its literary structure suggests it is derived from a common source as the Francken Manuscripts.

=== Scottish Perfection Lodges ===
A Loge de Parfaits d' Écosse was formed on 12 April 1764 at New Orleans, becoming the first high-degree lodge on the North American continent. Its life, however, was short, as the Treaty of Paris (1763) ceded New Orleans to Spain, and the Catholic Spanish crown had been historically hostile to Freemasonry. Documented Masonic activity ceased for a time. It did not return to New Orleans until the late 1790s, when French refugees from the revolution in Saint-Domingue settled in the city.

Francken traveled to New York in 1767 where he granted a Patent, dated 26 December 1767, for the formation of a Lodge of Perfection at Albany, which was called "Ineffable Lodge of Perfection". This marked the first time the Degrees of Perfection (the 4th through the 14th) were conferred in one of the Thirteen British colonies in North America. This Patent, and the early minutes of the Lodge, are extant and are in the archives of Supreme Council, Northern Jurisdiction. The minutes of Ineffable Lodge of Perfection reveal that it ceased activity on December 5, 1774. It was revived by Giles Fonda Yates about 1820 or 1821, and came under authority of the Supreme Council, Southern Jurisdiction until 1827. That year it was transferred to the Supreme Council, Northern Jurisdiction.

While in New York City, Francken also communicated the degrees to Moses Michael Hays, a Jewish businessman, and appointed him as a Deputy Inspector General. In 1781, Hays made eight Deputy Inspectors General, four of whom were later important in the establishment of Scottish Rite Freemasonry in South Carolina:

- Isaac Da Costa Sr., D.I.G. for South Carolina;
- Abraham Forst, D.I.G. for Virginia;
- Joseph M. Myers, D.I.G. for Maryland;
- Barend M. Spitzer, D.I.G. for Georgia.

Da Costa returned to Charleston, South Carolina, where he established the "Sublime Grand Lodge of Perfection" in February 1783. After Da Costa's death in November 1783, Hays appointed Myers as Da Costa's successor. Joined by Forst and Spitzer, Myers created additional high-degree bodies in Charleston.

Physician Hyman Isaac Long from the island of Jamaica, who settled in New York City, went to Charleston in 1796 to appoint eight French men; he had received his authority through Spitzer. These men had arrived as refugees from Saint-Domingue, where the slave revolution was underway that would establish Haiti as an independent republic in 1804. They organized a Consistory of the 25th Degree, or "Princes of the Royal Secret," which Masonic historian Brigadier ACF Jackson says became the first Supreme Council of the Scottish Rite. According to Fox, by 1801, the Charleston bodies were the only extant bodies of the Rite in North America.

=== Birth of the Scottish Rite, 1801 ===
On May 24, 1801, John Mitchell appointed Frederick Dalcho a Deputy Inspector General of the Order of the Royal Secret. On May 31, Mitchell and Dalcho opened the Supreme Council of the Thirty-third Degree for the United States of America at Shepheard's Tavern in Charleston, South Carolina. The council administered thirty-three degrees, including the twenty-five degrees of Étienne Morin's Order of the Royal Secret, and was the first Supreme Council of the Thirty-third Degree.

The council later recognized eleven men associated with its establishment in 1801 and 1802 as its founders, known as the "Eleven Gentlemen of Charleston": John Mitchell, Frederick Dalcho, Thomas Bartholomew Bowen, Abraham Alexander, Emanuel De La Motta, Isaac Auld, Israel de Lieben, Alexandre Francois Auguste de Grasse, Jean-Baptiste Marie Delahogue, Moses Clava Levy, and James Moultrie.

On August 5, 1813, Emanuel De La Motta, acting under the authority of the Charleston council, issued a proclamation and charter establishing the Supreme Council for the Northern District and Jurisdiction of the United States, with Daniel D. Tompkins as its first Sovereign Grand Commander. After an internal schism in 1860, the rival Northern councils reunited on May 15, 1867.

=== Albert Pike ===
The double-headed eagle on the cover of Morals and Dogma.

Born in Boston, Massachusetts on December 29, 1809, Albert Pike is asserted within the Southern Jurisdiction as the man most responsible for the growth and success of the Scottish Rite from an obscure Masonic Rite in the mid-19th century to the international fraternity that it became. Pike received the 4th through the 32nd Degrees in March 1853 from Albert Mackey, in Charleston, South Carolina, and was appointed Deputy Inspector for Arkansas that same year.

In 1857 Pike completed his first revision of the 4°-32° ritual and printed 100 copies. This revision, which Mackey dubbed the "Magnum Opus", was never adopted by the Supreme Council. According to Arturo de Hoyos, 33°, the Scottish Rite's Grand Historian, the Magnum Opus became the basis for future ritual revisions.

In March 1858, Pike was elected a member of the Supreme Council for the Southern Jurisdiction of the United States, and in January 1859 he became its Grand Commander. The American Civil War interrupted his work on the Scottish Rite rituals. Around 1870, he, and the Supreme Council, moved to Washington, DC. In 1884 his revision of the rituals was complete.

Scottish Rite Grand Archivist and Grand Historian de Hoyos created the following chart of Pike's ritual revisions:

Degrees	When Revised
1–3°	1872
4–14°	1861, 1870, 1883
15–16°	1861, 1870, 1882
17–18°	1861, 1870
19–30°	1867, 1879, 1883
31–32°	1867, 1879, 1883
33°	1857, 1867, 1868, 1880 (manuscripts only)

Pike also wrote lectures about all the degrees, which were published in 1871 under the title Morals and Dogma of the Ancient and Accepted Scottish Rite of Freemasonry.

== General organization and degree structure ==
The Ancient and Accepted Scottish Rite is a rite comprising 33 degrees. The first three degrees are administered by "blue lodges" or "symbolic lodges." The next thirty degrees (from the 4th to the 33rd), the high or side degrees – a further development and complement to the first three – are administered by the "Supreme Councils of the 33rd and final degree of the Ancient and Accepted Scottish Rite." However, the name can slightly vary depending on the jurisdictions.

There is no international governing body aside from Le Droit Humain, which is an international order; all of the other Supreme Councils in each country are sovereign unto themselves in their own jurisdictions.

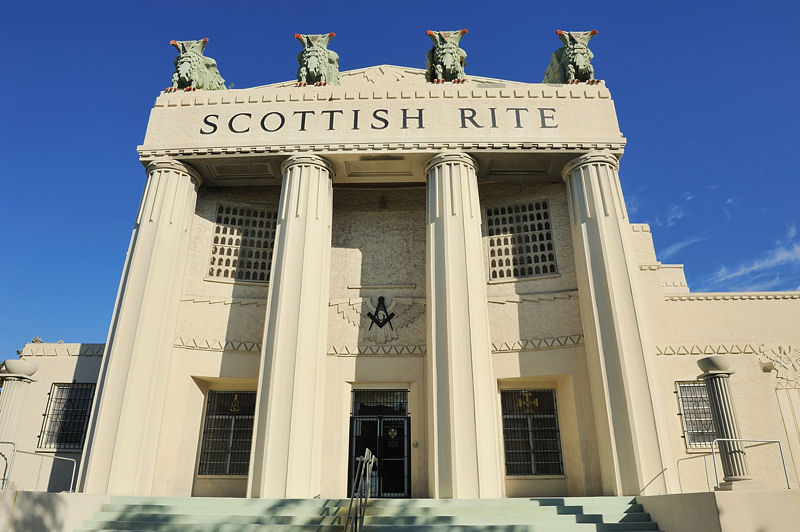
Scottish Rite building in the Lummus Park neighborhood of Miami, Florida, United States

The thirty-three degrees of the Scottish Rite are conferred by several controlling bodies. The first of these is the Craft Blue Lodge, which confers the Entered Apprentice, Fellowcraft, and Master Mason degrees. Craft Blue lodges operate under the authority of national (or in the US, state) Grand Lodges, not the Supreme Council.

The highest degree is that of Master Mason. That is why the degrees with a number higher than the third must be considered as “side” degrees (even when called High degrees): they are seen as degrees of instruction or improvement, and not as “higher” degrees, that is, implying a particular power that a Master Mason could claim to be above the others. The hierarchical structure of Freemasonry can be likened to a three-tiered edifice, with the third tier, the Master Mason, being the highest. Attaining this level grants a Freemason access to the corridors of the third tier, where he can delve deeper into his Masonic education and broaden his understanding of the craft. They represent a lateral movement in Masonic education rather than an upward movement and are degrees of instruction rather than rank.

=== Degree progression in the Scottish Rite ===
Inspired by the Solomonic Tradition and centered on the construction of the Temple of Jerusalem, the Scottish Rite closely combines the criterion of duration, as characteristic of the initiatory process, with the criterion of construction, which commits the adept to the path laid out by the Rite. Building oneself in the AASR system is seen as a long process which is accomplished on the path of truth, justice and wisdom.

This long and lengthy process to obtain the degrees can be found within the foundational documents of the AASR, the Constitution and Regulation of 1762, that is present on the altar of every Lodge in the Southern Jurisdiction. The foundational document proscribes the following minimum time allowed to receive the degrees: "All these degrees, into which one can only be initiated in a mysterious number of months, to arrive at each degree in due succession, make the number, in all, of 81 months.

Thus, almost seven years was the minimum allowed time to obtain the 25 degrees, in the foundational document of the AASR.

The process cannot be a solitary, silent quest for self-fulfillment; the collective project must always prevail over individual pretensions in the AASR system.

=== The Motto of the Scottish Rite: Ordo ab Chao ===
This motto is probably found for the first time in the patent of February 1, 1802 issued by the brother, Alexandre, Auguste comte De Grasse, marquis de Tilly.

The motto "ordo ab chao" implies the action of a principle of order, the chaos from which each of us comes symbolizing the suffering and disarray of the human spirit that precedes the path to a spiritual life of peace and brotherhood.

It is explained as denoting the mission as Masons is to bring order out of chaos. It becomes a source of hope for those in darkness, who aspire to the Light.

=== The Craft Degrees of the Ancient and Accepted Scottish Rite ===
The Ancient and Accepted Scottish Rite is a full Masonic Rite and has its own distinctive versions of the Craft or Blue Lodge rituals which includes the Entered Apprentice, Fellow Craft, and Master Mason degrees. It is the most practiced Rite in the world thus most Master Masons are made through the Scottish Rite system with the exception of the United States of America where most Lodges do not work the first three degrees in the Scottish Rite but rather join after the attainment of the third degree in their own systems.

However, some U.S. Lodges do practice the Ancient and Accepted Scottish Rite blue degrees, and, in recent years, they have grown in number. There are 11 lodges in New Orleans (Historically all located in the district 16 they recently approved a new one district 20), 16 in New York City as well as Washington DC, Hawaii and California, that work in the Scottish Rite Craft degrees.

The Ancient and Accepted Scottish Rite blue degrees are more common in Europe, Asia, Africa and Latin-American jurisdictions. All lodges in the International Order of Freemasonry for Men & Women, Le Droit Humain, work "seamlessly from the first to the thirty-third degree and practice only the Ancient and Accepted Scottish Rite. These two characteristics define it as an Order and not as an Obedience". Most lodges under the jurisdiction of the Grande Loge de France use these degrees, as do a few of the lodges under the jurisdiction of the Grande Loge Nationale Française. It is also a dominant ritual, out of the other rituals in use, in the Grand Lodge of Spain. There are two Lodges in Australia that practice the AASR Craft degrees, The Zetland Lodge of Australia No. 9 and Lodge France 1021, both of which are under the United Grand Lodge of New South Wales and the Australian Capital Territory.

A hypothesis from Masonic historian Alain Bernheim, Belgian Masonic scholar Pierre Noël hypothesized in a 2002 paper that the Ancient and Accepted Scottish Rite Craft degrees might be derived from a French translation of the Masonic exposé Three Distinct Knocks, issued in London in 1760. But this theory is heavily debated among Masonic Scholars.

=== Degree names ===
In 2000, the Southern Jurisdiction in the United States completed a revision of its ritual scripts. The current ritual is based upon Pike's, but with some differences. Generally, the current titles of the degrees and their arrangement in the Southern Jurisdiction remains substantially unchanged since the time of Pike.

In 2004, the Northern Jurisdiction in the United States rewrote and reorganized its degrees. Further changes have occurred in 2006. During those two revisions, the names of 21 out of the 33 degrees were changed.

The list of degrees for the Supreme Councils of Australia, England and Wales, and most other jurisdictions largely agrees with that of the Southern Jurisdiction of the U.S. However, the list of degrees for the Northern Jurisdiction of the United States is now somewhat different and is given in the table below. The list of degrees of the Supreme Council of Canada reflects a mixture of the two, with some unique titles as well:

Degree	Southern Jurisdiction	Prince Hall Southern Jurisdiction	Northern Jurisdiction	Prince Hall Northern Jurisdiction	France and Canada	England and Wales	Scotland	Le Droit Humain
1°	Entered Apprentice							
2°	Fellow-Craft				Companion / Fellow-Craft	Fellow-Craft		
3°	Master Mason							
4°	Secret Master		Builder/Master Traveller	Secret Master				
5°	Perfect Master		Perfect Master/Perfect Traveller	Perfect Master				
6°	Intimate Secretary		Master of the Brazen Serpent	Intimate Secretary				
7°	Provost and Judge						Provost and Judge or Irish Master	Provost and Judge
8°	Intendant of the Building						Intendant of the Building or Master in Israel	Intendant of the Buildings
9°	Elu of the Nine	Elect of the Nine	Master of the Temple	Elect of Nine	Elect of the Nine	Elect of Nine	Elu of the Nine (Elected Knight of the Nine)	Elect of Nine
10°	Elu of the Fifteen	Elect of the Fifteen	Master Elect	Elect of Fifteen	Elect of the Fifteen	Elect of Fifteen	Elu of the Fifteen (Illustrious Elect of the Fifteen)	Elect of Fifteen
11°	Elu of the Twelve	Sublime Elect of the Twelve	Sublime Master Elected	Sublime Elect of Twelve	Elect of the Twelve	Sublime Elect	Elu of the Twelve (Sublime Knight Elect of the Twelve)	Sublime Elect
12°	Master Architect	Grand Master Architect	Master of Mercy	Grand Master Architect			Master Architect	Grand Master Architect
13°	Royal Arch of Solomon	Royal Arch of Enoch	Master of the Ninth Arch		Royal Arch of Solomon	Ancient Master of the Royal Arch of Enoch	Royal Arch of Solomon or Knight of the Ninth Arch	Royal Arch of Enoch
14°	Perfect Elu	Grand Elect, Perfect and Subline Mason	Grand Elect Mason	Grand Elect Perfect and Sublime Mason		Grand Elect Perfect and Sublime Master	Perfect Elu (Grand Elect, Perfect and Sublime Mason)	Scotch Knight of Perfection
15°	Knight of the East, or Knight of the Sword, or Knight of the Eagle	Knight of the East or Sword	Knight of the East	Knight of the East or Sword	Knight of the East, or Knight of the Sword	Knight of the Sword, or Knight of the East	Knight of the East, of the Sword, or of the Eagle	Knight of the Sword or the East
16°	Prince of Jerusalem							
17°	Knight of the East and West							
18°	Knight Rose Croix	Knight of Rose Croix	Knight of the Rose Croix of H.R.D.M.	Knight of the Rose Croix	Knight Rose Croix	Sovereign Prince Rose Croix, or Knight of the Pelican and Eagle	Knight Rose Croix	Sovereign Prince of Rose Croix of H.R.D.M.
19°	Grand Pontiff		Brother of the Trail	Grand Pontiff				Grand Pontiff or Sublime Scottish Knight
20°	Master of the Symbolic Lodge		Master ad Vitam	Grand Master of All Symbolic Lodges; or. Master ad Vitam	Master ad Vitam	Venerable Grand Master	Master of the Symbolic Lodge	Sovereign Prince or Master ad Vitam
21°	Noachite, or Prussian Knight		Patriarch Noachite	Noachite or Prussian Knight	Patriarch Noachite		Noachite or Prussian Knight	
22°	Knight of the Royal Axe, or Prince of Libanus		Prince of Libanus	Knight of the Royal Axe; or Prince of Libanus	Prince of Libanus		Knight Royal Axe, Prince of Libanus	Prince of the Lebanon, or Knight of the Royal Axe
23°	Chief of the Tabernacle		Knight of Valor	Chief of the Tabernacle				
24°	Prince of the Tabernacle		Brother of Tolerance/Brother of the Forest	Prince of the Tabernacle				
25°	Knight of the Brazen Serpent		Master of Achievement	Knight of the Brazen Serpent				
26°	Prince of Mercy, or Scottish Trinitarian	Prince of Mercy	Friend and Brother Eternal	Prince of Mercy			Prince of Mercy, or Scottish Trinitarian	Prince of Mercy
27°	Knight of the Sun, or Prince Adept	Knight Commander of the Temple	Knight of Jerusalem	Knight Commander of the Temple	Commander of the Temple		Knight Commander of the Temple	Sovereign Commander of the Temple
28°	Knight Commander of the Temple	Knight of the Sun					Knight of the Sun or Prince Adept	
29°	Scottish Knight of Saint Andrew		Knight of Saint Andrew				Scottish Knight of St. Andrew	Grand Scottish Knight of St. Andrew
30°	Knight Kadosh, or Knight of the White and Black Eagle	Knight Kadosh	Grand Inspector	Knight Kadosh		Grand Elected Knight Kadosh, or Knight of the White and Black Eagle	Knight of Kadosh, or Knight of the White & Black Eagle	Grand Elect Knight K.H.
31°	Inspector Inquisitor	Grand Inspector Inquisitor Commander	My Brother's Keeper	Grand Inspector Inquisitor Commander	Inspector Inquisitor Commander	Grand Inspector Inquisitor Commander	Inspector Inquisitor	Grand Inspector Inquisitor Commander
32°	Master of the Royal Secret	Sublime Prince of the Royal Secret					Master of the Royal Secret	Sublime Prince of the Royal Secret
33°	Inspector General	Grand Inspector General	Sovereign Grand Inspector General				Inspector General	Sovereign Grand Inspector General

== Variations among jurisdictions ==
Procedures for conferring Scottish Rite degrees vary by jurisdiction. In the Northern Masonic Jurisdiction of the United States, a candidate must receive the 4th degree and three additional degrees before becoming eligible to receive the 32nd degree; the other degrees may be viewed later. In England and Wales, individual chapters confer the 4th through 18th degrees, while higher degrees are conferred by the Supreme Council.

The Order of Universal Co-Masonry describes its Ancient and Accepted Universal Rite as a combination of the Scottish and York Rite systems. It numbers the Mark Master Mason degree as its 4th degree, the Royal Ark Mariner degree as its 12th, and the Holy Royal Arch of Jerusalem as its 13th.

== The Ancient and Accepted Scottish Rite by country ==
=== General practices ===
The relationship between the Scottish Rite and Craft Masonry varies by jurisdiction. In the Northern Masonic Jurisdiction of the United States, the Scottish Rite is an appendant body open to Master Masons, and its degree system comprises the 4th through 32nd degrees, with an additional honorary 33rd degree. The international order Le Droit Humain works the Ancient and Accepted Scottish Rite from the 1st through the 33rd degree.

=== Scottish Rite Masonic calendar ===
Scottish Rite documents have historically used the Anno Mundi (A.M., "year of the world") dating system, based on the Hebrew calendar. Traditional Masonic reference works calculate the year by adding 3,760 to the Common Era year and adding one more after September. Charles T. McClenachan's 1899 handbook included a calendar correlating Hebrew and Common Era dates and identifying feast days observed by Rose Croix chapters.

== Europe ==
=== Austria ===
The chapter Mozart im Tale zu Wien began work in 1923. The Supreme Council of the Ancient and Accepted Scottish Rite in Austria was founded on 25 October 1925. Following the annexation of Austria by Nazi Germany in March 1938, Nazi authorities searched and closed the council's premises and seized its records. The Austrian Scottish Rite organization was re-established in early 1948 under the name Freimaurervereinigung Schottischer Ritus.

=== France ===
==== History ====
After returning to France in 1804, Alexandre de Grasse-Tilly helped establish a Supreme Council and the Grande Loge Générale Écossaise. The Grande Loge Générale Écossaise and the Grand Orient de France concluded an agreement in December 1804 that united the two organizations. Disputes over the implementation of the agreement emerged in 1805.

In September 1815, the Grand Orient formed a Conseil Suprême des Rites within its organization and installed a Grand Consistoire des Rites in November. Several members of the original Supreme Council joined the Grand Orient body, while the independent Supreme Council became dormant. Honoré Muraire reorganized the independent council on 24 June 1821. The Grand Orient body later became known as the Grand Collège des Rites.

In 1822, the reorganized Supreme Council established the Grande Loge Centrale du Rite Écossais Ancien et Accepté to administer its symbolic lodges. In 1894, these lodges adopted the name Grande Loge de France, and in 1895 they merged with the lodges of the Grande Loge Symbolique Écossaise. The last formal dependency between the Grande Loge de France and the Supreme Council ended in 1904, when the latter ceased issuing warrants for new lodges.

A further division occurred in 1965. After resigning from the Suprême Conseil de France, Charles Riandey and nine former members established the Suprême Conseil pour la France, which was formally installed on 24 April 1965.

==== Practices ====
In France, the Scottish Rite may be practiced from the first degree in symbolic lodges. The Grande Loge de France, for example, works the Rite's first three degrees in its symbolic lodges. Degrees above Master Mason are administered by separate higher-degree bodies. Not every intermediate degree is necessarily conferred through a complete ceremony; some may instead be transmitted "by communication".

=== Ireland ===
The Ancient and Accepted Rite for Ireland was brought to Ireland from America in 1824. Its Supreme Council operates from Freemasons' Hall on Molesworth Street in Dublin, and membership is strictly by invitation only.

The physician Sir Charles Cameron and judge Gerald FitzGibbon each served as Sovereign and Commander of the Supreme Council.

=== Italy ===
A Supreme Council of the Ancient and Accepted Scottish Rite for Italy was established on 16 March 1805 as a branch of the French Supreme Council. On 20 June 1805, the Grand Orient of Italy was established in Milan, with Eugène de Beauharnais as grand master.

=== Romania ===
The Supreme Council of the Ancient and Accepted Scottish Rite in Romania was established in 1881 under Constantin Moroiu.

From 1948 to 1989, Freemasonry was banned in Romania by the communist regime. The Romanian Supreme Council was reconsecrated in Washington, D.C., on 19 October 1993 by the Supreme Council, Southern Jurisdiction of the United States.

=== United Kingdom ===
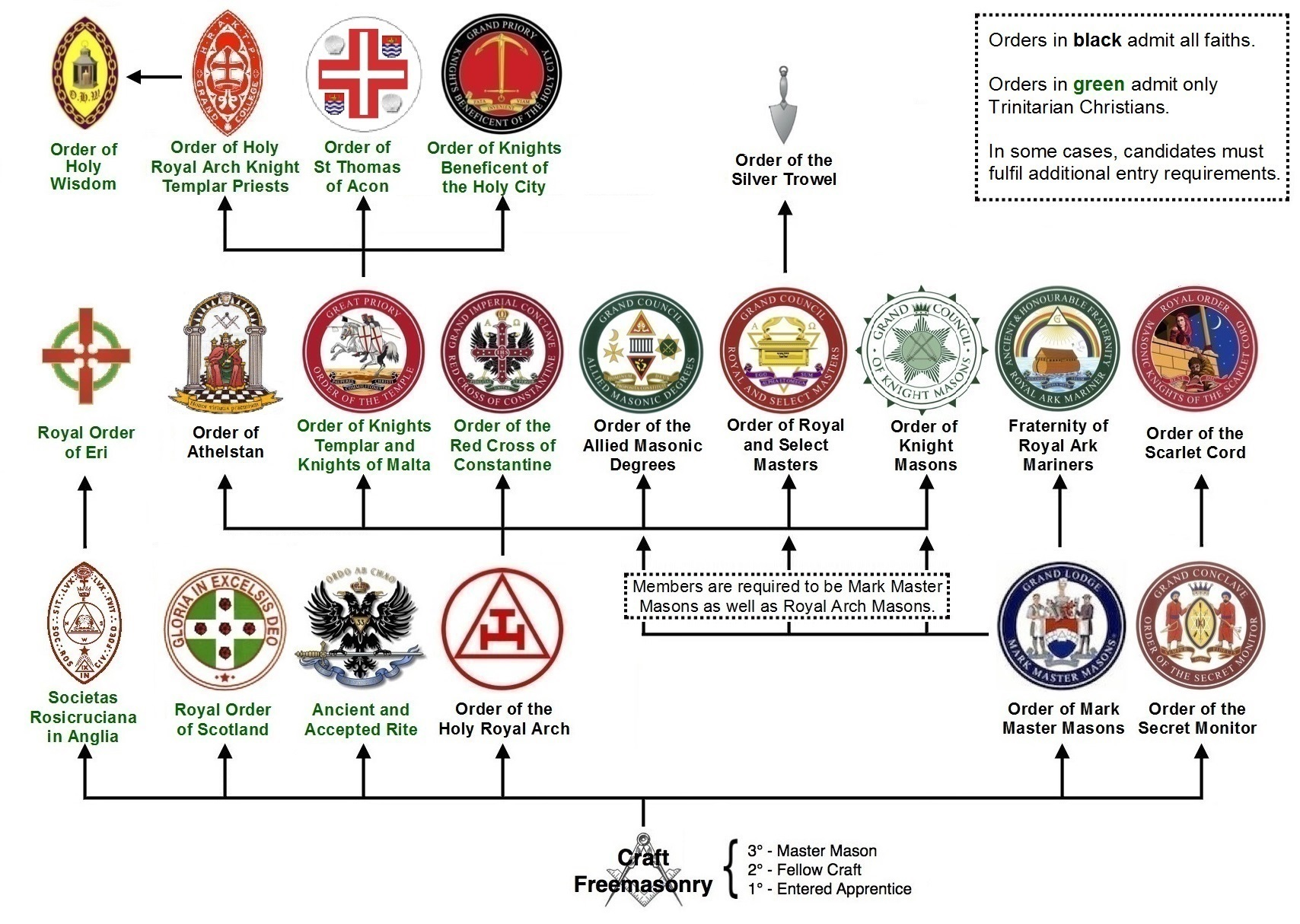
The position of the Ancient and Accepted Rite among the Masonic appendant bodies in England and Wales

In England and Wales, whose Supreme Council was warranted by that of the Northern Masonic Jurisdiction of the USA (in 1845), the Rite is known colloquially as the "Rose Croix" although this is just one of the degrees. More formally, it is known as "The Ancient and Accepted Rite for England and Wales and its Districts and Chapters Overseas". In England and Wales, the adjective "Scottish" is generally left out, although in continental European jurisdictions, they retain the "Écossais".

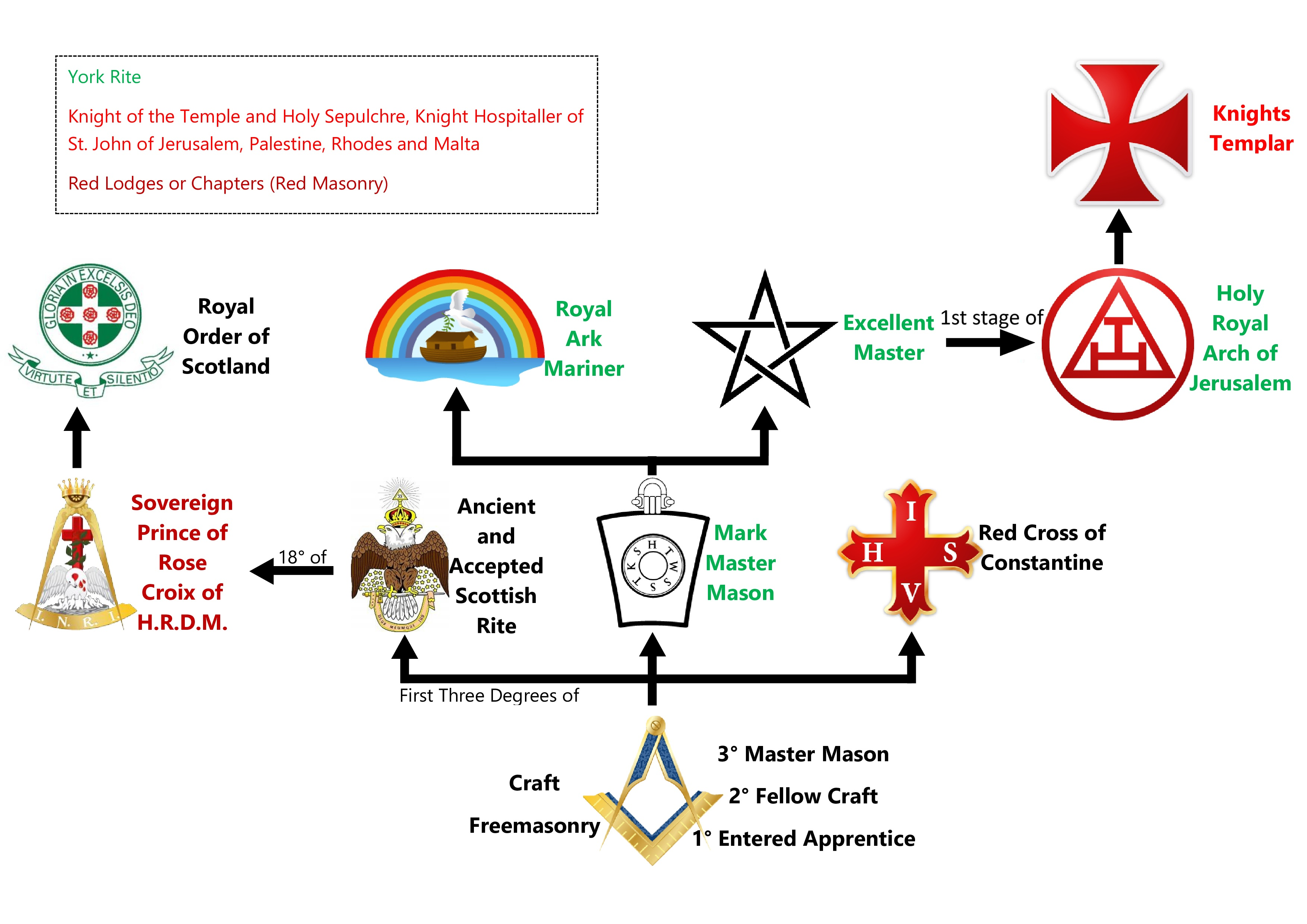
Position of the AASR among the Allied Degrees of British Le Droit Humain

There are 25,000 members of the Supreme Council out of the 160,000 members of the United Grand Lodge of England. England and Wales are divided into Districts, which administer the Rose Croix Chapters within their District. There are also some eighteen Districts overseas, as well as some 'unattached' Chapters in a further nine countries. All candidates for membership must have been Master masons for at least six months.

Many degrees are conferred in name only, and degrees beyond the 18° are conferred only by the Supreme Council itself. In England and Wales, the candidate is perfected in the 18th degree with the preceding degrees awarded in name only. Continuing to the 30th degree is restricted to those who have served in the chair of the Chapter. Degrees beyond the 30th are conferred only upon a very small number of individuals.

In Scotland, the 18th and 30th degree are practised. A minimum of a two-year interval is required before continuing to the 30th degree, again with the intervening degrees awarded by name only. Elevation beyond that is by invitation only, and numbers are severely restricted.

The Ancient and Accepted Scottish Rite is also practiced from the 1st to the 33rd degree by the British Federation of Le Droit Humain, and from the 1st to the 3rd degree by the all-male lodge The White Swan, No. 1348, of the Grande Loge de France in London, as well as by the mixed lodge Marco Polo of the Gran Loggia d'Italia.

== North America ==
=== Canada ===
In Canada, the Supreme Council is called "Supreme Council 33° Ancient and Accepted Scottish Rite of Freemasonry of Canada" and was warranted in 1874 by that of England and Wales. Canada's Supreme Council office is located at 4 Queen Street South in Hamilton, Ontario. There are 45 local units or "Valleys" across Canada.

=== United States ===
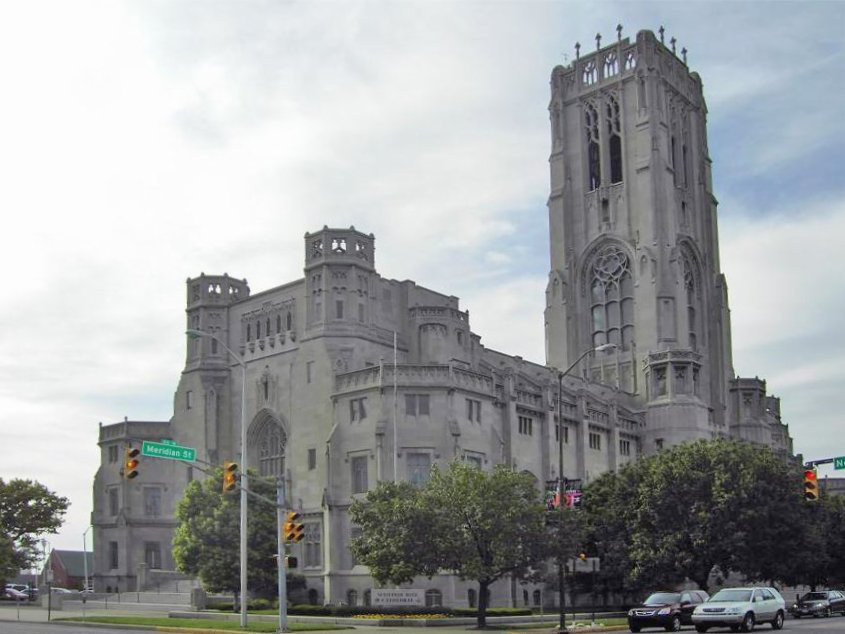
Scottish Rite Cathedral in Indianapolis, Indiana

In the United States of America there are five Supreme Councils: the Supreme Council, Southern Jurisdiction, in Washington, D.C., the Supreme Council, Northern Masonic Jurisdiction in Lexington, Massachusetts, the Supreme Council of Louisiana, United Supreme Council, Prince Hall Affiliation, Northern Jurisdiction, located in Philadelphia, and the United Supreme Council, Prince Hall Affiliation, Southern Jurisdiction, located in Memphis, Tennessee.

They each have particular characteristics and degree structure that make them different. In the United States, members of the various Scottish Rite bodies can be elected to receive the 33° by their respective Supreme Council which is conferred on members who have made major contributions to society or to Masonry in general. Only four of the Supreme Councils are seen as regular or legitimate freemasonry. The Supreme Council of Louisiana is branch of Freemasonry known as "Cerneauism," which refers to its founder Joseph Cerneau, and is considered irregular by the other four Supreme Councils. The two United Supreme Council, Prince Hall Affiliation, were not seen as regular by the other two Supreme Councils for almost two centuries. This began to change in the mid-1900s and was officially ratified on September 7, 2022 with the Statement of Unity signed by all four Sovereign Grand Commanders.

==== Supreme Council, Southern Jurisdiction ====
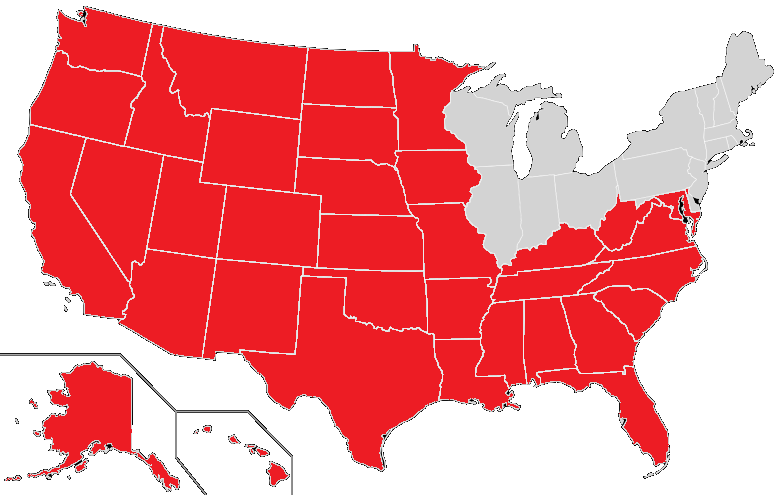
US states in the Southern Jurisdiction

Based in Washington, D.C., the Southern Jurisdiction (often referred to as the "Mother Supreme Council of the World") was founded in Charleston, South Carolina, in 1801. It oversees the Ancient and Accepted Scottish Rite in 35 states, which are referred to as Orients, which are divided into regions called Valleys, each containing individual bodies.

In the Southern Jurisdiction of the United States, the Supreme Council consists of no more than 33 members, called Active members, and is presided over by a Sovereign Grand Commander, and since 2019, Illustrious Brother James D. Cole, 33°. Other members of the Supreme Council are called "Sovereign Grand Inspectors General" (S.G.I.G.), and each is the head of the AASR bodies in his respective Orient (or state). Other heads of the various Orients who are not members of the Supreme Council are called "Deputies of the Supreme Council." The Supreme Council of the Southern Jurisdiction meets every odd year during the month of August at the House of the Temple, Ancient and Accepted Scottish Rite of Freemasonry Southern Jurisdiction Headquarters, in Washington, D.C. During this conference, the Valley of Washington D.C. confers the 33° for those elected to receive it or others of the degree who desire to watch it. There are closed meetings between the Grand Commander and the S.G.I.G.s, and many members of the fraternity from all over the world attend the open ceremony on the 5th of 6 council meeting days.

==== Northern Jurisdiction ====
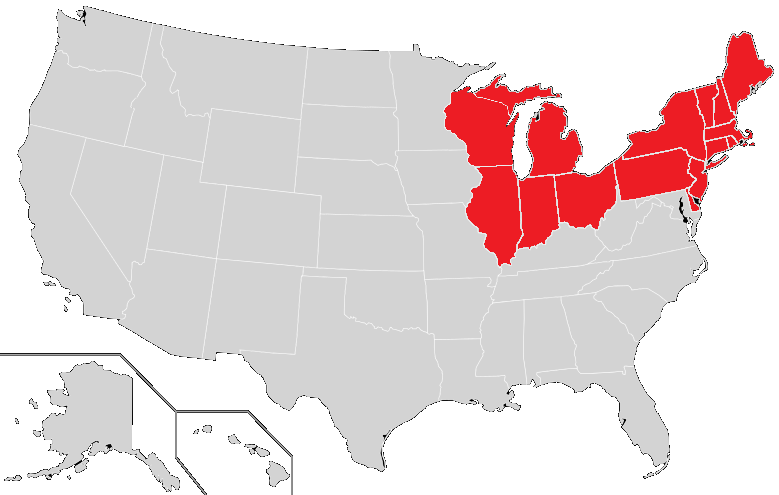
US states in the Northern Jurisdiction

The Lexington, Massachusetts-based Northern Masonic Jurisdiction, formed in 1813, and inactive from 1832 to 1845, oversees the bodies in fifteen states: Connecticut, Delaware, Illinois, Indiana, Maine, Massachusetts, Michigan, New Jersey, New Hampshire, New York, Ohio, Pennsylvania, Rhode Island, Wisconsin and Vermont. The Northern Jurisdiction is only divided into Valleys, not Orients. Each Valley has up to four Scottish Rite bodies, and each body confers a set of degrees.

In the Northern Jurisdiction, the Supreme Council consists of no more than 66 members, led by the Sovereign Grand Commander, currently Ill. Walter F. Wheeler, 33°, who was elected to the position in 2023. Those who are elected to membership on the Supreme Council are then designated "Active." In the Northern Jurisdiction all recipients of the 33rd Degree are honorary members of the Supreme Council, and all members are referred to as a "Sovereign Grand Inspectors General." The head of the Rite in each State of the Northern Jurisdiction is called a "Deputy of the Supreme Council." Thus, the highest-ranking Scottish Rite officer in Ohio, is titled, "Deputy for Ohio", and so forth for each state. Additionally, each Deputy has one or more "Actives" to assist him in the administration of the state. Active members of the Supreme Council who have served faithfully for ten years, or reach the age of 75, may be designated "Active, Emeritus". The Northern Jurisdiction Supreme Council meets yearly, in the even years by an executive session, and in the odd years, with the full membership invited. The 33rd Degree is conferred on the odd years at the Annual Meeting.

In the Northern Jurisdiction, there is a 46-month requirement for eligibility to receive the 33rd degree, and while there is a Meritorious Service Award (as well as a Distinguished Service Award), they are not required intermediate steps towards the 33°.

==== Supreme Council of Louisiana ====
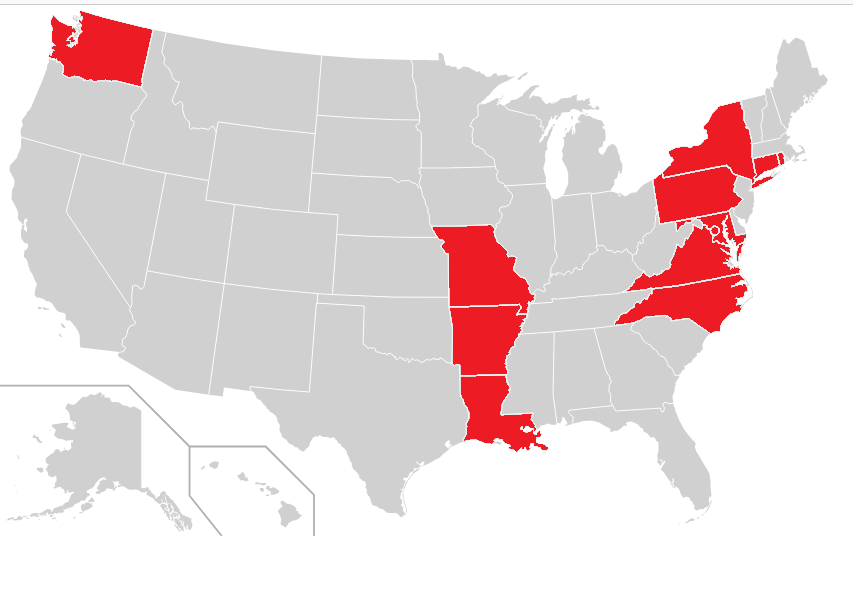
States in which the Supreme Council of Louisiana is present as of 2023.

The Supreme Council of Louisiana was founded in New Orleans in 1839 in the aftermath of the Morgan Affair. During this time, the Northern Jurisdiction consisted of John James Joseph Gourgas and Giles Fonda Yates who were "effectively a Supreme Council of two people." Likewise, the Grand Commander of the Southern Jurisdiction, Moses Holbrook longed to "relinquish his responsibilities as Sovereign Grand Commander" moving to the rural frontier of Florida to serve as a doctor.

It was during this period that the Supreme Council of Louisiana emerged, which claimed its authority via "Cerneauism" – a type of Scottish Rite Masonry without ties to the either the Northern or Southern Jurisdictions. After the Civil War, the Grand Orient of France recognized the Supreme Council of Louisiana.

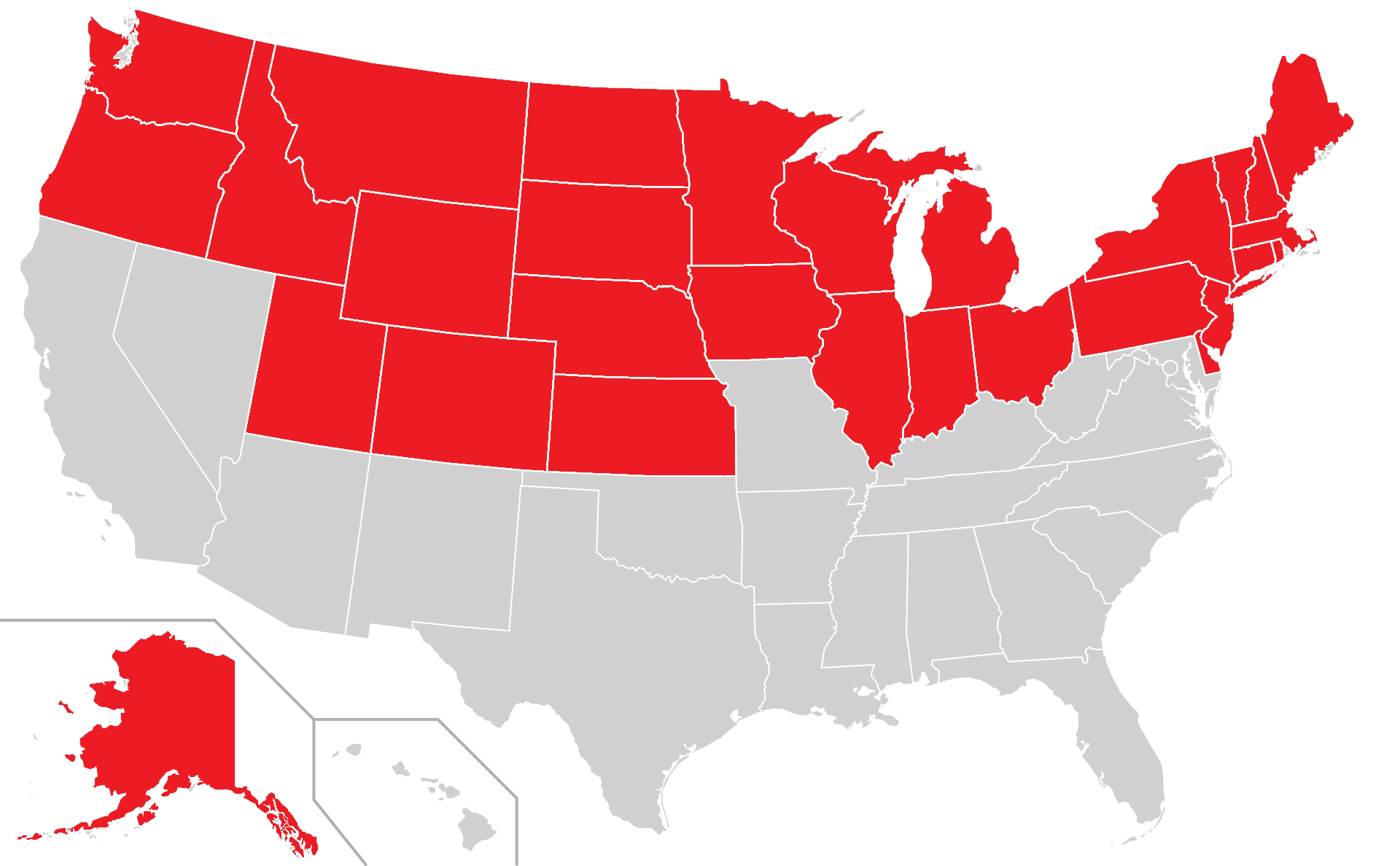
US states in the Northern Jurisdiction, Prince Hall Affiliation

New Orleans educator and Civil Rights activist George Longe was the head of this council for nearly five decades, from 1938 to 1985. Under his watch the Supreme Council of Louisiana tripled in size and expanded to other states. His papers are held at the Amistad Research Center of Tulane University. As of 2023, the Most Powerful Sovereign Grand Commander of the Supreme Council of Louisiana is Ill. Bro. Eddie L. Gabriel Sr. 33°.

==== United Supreme Council, Prince Hall Affiliation, Southern Jurisdiction ====
Based in Memphis, Tennessee, the United Supreme Council, Prince Hall Affiliation, Southern Jurisdiction, oversees the states in the bottom half of the United States. African Americans were barred from the Southern and Northern Jurisdictions of the Scottish Rite and so formed their own organizations. Originally, there were five Supreme Councils, but they merged into two official United Supreme Councils in 1881. Currently, nine men serve as elected officers of the United Supreme Council with Illustrious Brother Corey D. Hawkins, Sr., 33°, serving as Sovereign Grand Commander.

==== United Supreme Council, Prince Hall Affiliation, Northern Jurisdiction ====
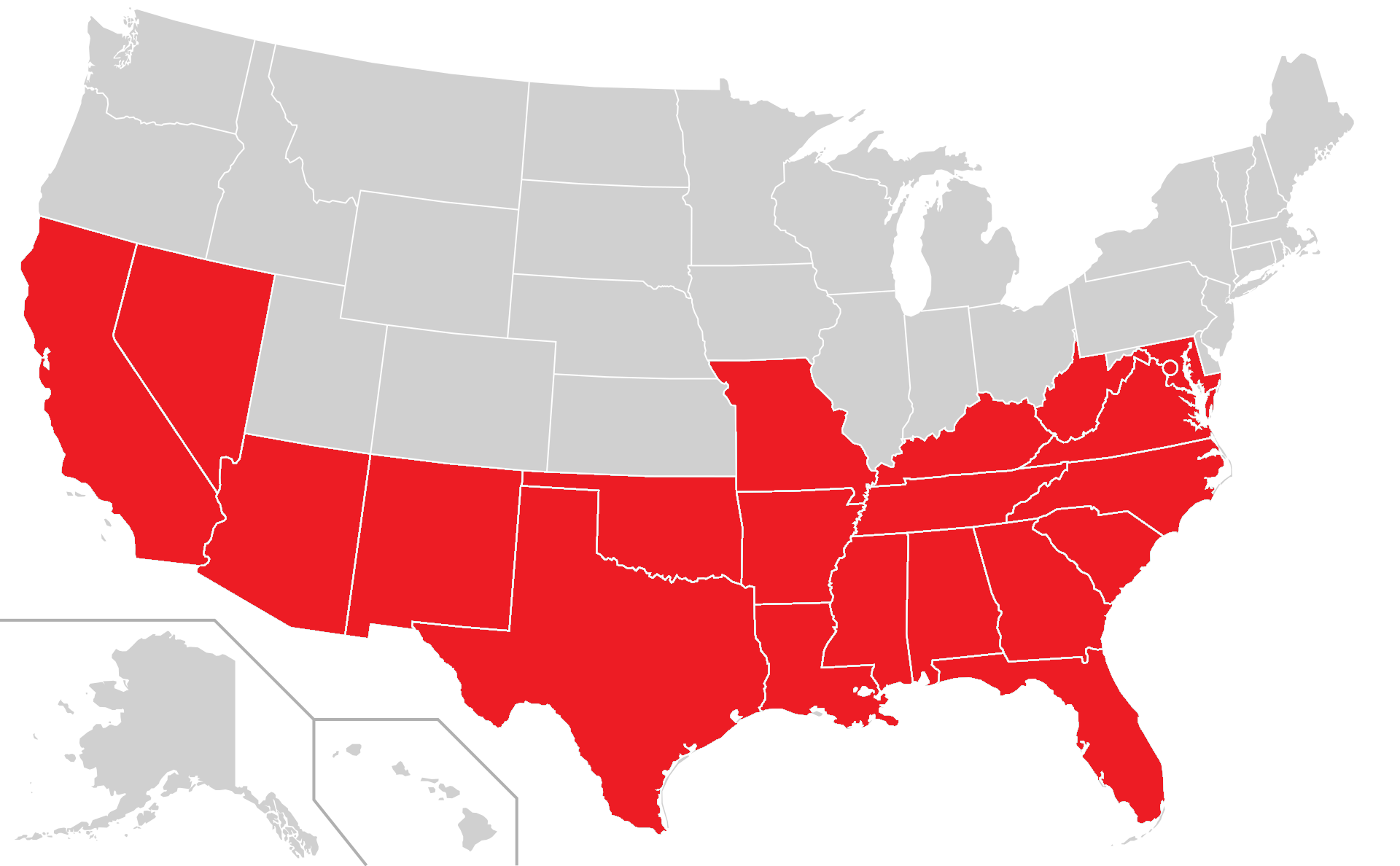
US states in the Southern Jurisdiction, Prince Hall Affiliation

Based in Philadelphia, the United Supreme Council, Prince Hall Affiliation, Northern Jurisdiction, oversees the states in the top half of the United States. In the 1800s and early 1900s, African Americans were barred from the Southern and Northern Jurisdictions of the Scottish Rite and so formed their own organizations. Originally, there were five Supreme Councils, but they merged into two official United Supreme Councils in 1881. Currently, there are seven elected officers of the United Supreme Council with Illustrious Brother, Melvin J. Bazemore, 33°, serving as Sovereign Grand Commander.

==== Criticism of the American System ====
The original constitutions of the Scottish Rite, prescribed a minimum interval between degrees and required approximately 81 months (seven years) to complete the original 25 degrees.

Traditionally, in most international jurisdictions, the Scottish Rite degrees are conferred gradually over many years, with candidates being individually invited to progress based on their demonstrated understanding and mastery of each degree's teachings.

However, many U.S. jurisdictions now confer degrees from the 4th to the 32nd in concentrated one or two-day sessions.

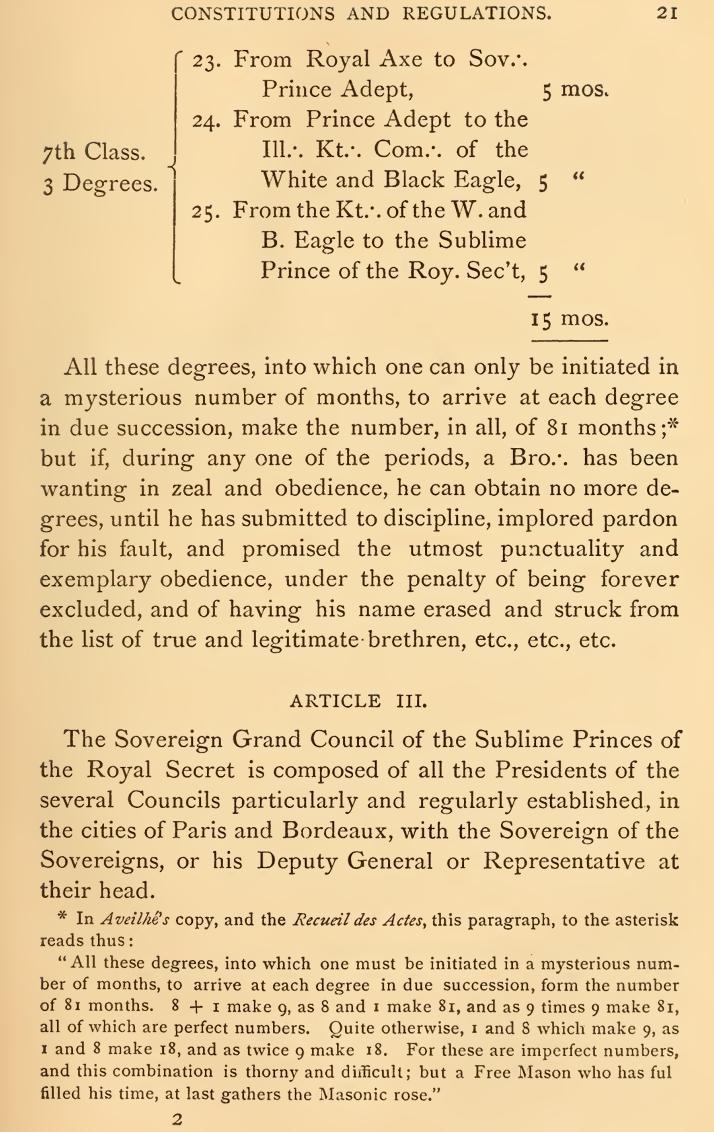
According to the Constitutions and regulations of 1762, candidates must spend at least 81 months (approximately 7 years) to progress through all 25 degrees of the ancient Scottish Rite tradition.

In response to these criticisms, some American Scottish Rite Masons have advocated for a return to more traditional, observant practices.

== See also ==
- French Rite
- Esotericism
- Grand College of Rites – A U.S. appendant body dedicated to preserving disused Masonic rituals and the rites of defunct Masonic societies.
- High Masonic degrees
- List of Masonic Rites
- Masonic bodies – An explanation of groups attached to "Blue Lodge" Freemasonry
- Rite of Memphis-Misraim – A European Masonic order dating from the 19th century, including degrees based on the three Blue Lodge and thirty-three Scottish Rite degrees, as well as additional esoteric degrees.
- Rite of Baldwyn – A rite of seven degrees, practised only in Bristol, UK.
- Societas Rosicruciana in Anglia - An esoteric masonic society (known as the SRICF in the US).
- York Rite – Another masonic rite or concordant body.
