= The Garden That Tilts =

Le Jardin qui bascule
- Directed by: Guy Gilles
- Release date: 1974
- Country: France
- Language: French

The Garden That Tilts (French: Le Jardin qui bascule) is a 1974 French drama film directed by Guy Gilles.

== Cast ==
- Philippe Chemin ... Roland
- Guy Bedos ... Maurice Garcia
- Caroline Cartier ... Sophie
- Pierre Fabre ... L'homme du banc
- Anouk Ferjac ... Nanou Garcia
- Sami Frey ... Michel
- Patrick Jouané ... Karl
- Ludovic Lutard ... Titi
- Jeanne Moreau ... Maria
- Jean-Marie Proslier ... Le patron du bistrot
- Delphine Seyrig ... Kate
- Howard Vernon ... Paul
