= Hyman Isaac Long =

American physician

Hyman Isaac Long was an American physician in New York City by 1786. He was an immigrant from the British colony of Jamaica in the West Indies and is listed in the first city directory of 1786. He is known for his leadership in developing Freemasonry organizations in New York, Virginia and South Carolina.

== Freemasonry ==
Hyman Isaac Long was born to a Jewish family in Jamaica, a British colony in the West Indies. They were likely of Sephardic Jewish ancestry, as this community had been active in London. A number had emigrated to the British colonies in the New World along with other English colonists. In Jamaica, Long studied medicine and qualified as a physician.

By 1786 Long had emigrated to New York City in the recently independent United States. He was listed that year in the first city directory, as a physician.

He also became involved in Freemasonry, and returned to Jamaica for some events and rites, where the organization was more developed. At Kingston, Jamaica, on 11 January 1795, Long was appointed as a Deputy Inspector General (DIG) of the Grand Consistory of the twenty-five degree "Rite of the Royal Secret," a governing body of high "Écossais" degrees of Freemasonry, and a predecessor of the Scottish Rite. This appointment was made by Moses Cohen.

Cohen had received a similar appointment by American Barend M. Spitzer the previous year at Charleston, South Carolina. Spitzer was DIG for Georgia.

After returning to the United States, Long continued to work on developing membership in the Masons. On 12 November 1796 in Charleston, South Carolina, Long elevated eight French Masons of the city to the rank of Deputy Inspector General. These men were colonial refugees from the slave rebellion in the French colony of Saint-Domingue (now Haiti). Among them were Alexandre Francois Auguste de Grasse, known as Comte de Grasse-Tilly, and his father-in-law, Jean-Baptiste de La Hogue. Together, these eight organized a Consistory of the 25th Degree, or "Princes of the Royal Secret." It later became the first Supreme Council of the Scottish Rite.
