= Nefertiti, figlia del sole =

- Directed by: Guy Gilles
- Written by: Guy Gilles; Enzo Peri
- Starring: Ben Gazzara
- Music by: Riz Ortolani
- Release dates: 1994; 1 August 1995 (Spain)
- Running time: 68 minutes
- Country: Italy
- Language: Italian

Nefertiti, figlia del sole is a 1994 Italian film directed by Guy Gilles.

== Synopsis ==
The film follows the theory that Nefertiti was a princess of the Mitanni, sent to marry Pharaoh Amenhotep III, then taken by Akhenaten as his wife. The plot is based on the desire for an archaeologist to find a means to revive himself several millennia after his death.

== Cast ==
- Michela Rocco di Torrepadula as Nefertiti
- Ben Gazzara as Amenhotep III
- François Négret as Akhenaton
- Antonella Lualdi as Tiyl
- Giada Desideri
- Paul Blain as Yamo
- Daniel Duval as Monkutura
- Jacques Penot as Bonchardt
- Cléonas Shannon as Arakat
- Marilyn Pater as Parkat
- Nini Crépon as Hori
- Guy Cuevas as Min
- Gennady Krihkina as Ay
