= The Old Lady Who Walked in the Sea =

- Directed by: Laurent Heynemann
- Written by: Dominique Roulet; Laurent Heynemann
- Based on: La vieille qui marchait dans la mer by Frederic Dard
- Produced by: Gérard Jourd'hui
- Starring: Jeanne Moreau; Michel Serrault; Luc Thuillier
- Cinematography: Robert Alazraki
- Music by: Philippe Sarde
- Production company: Blue Dahlia Productions
- Release date: 18 September 1991
- Running time: 97 minutes
- Country: France
- Language: French

The Old Lady Who Walked in the Sea (French: La vieille qui marchait dans la mer) is a 1991 French crime comedy-drama film directed by Laurent Heynemann and based on the novel by San Antonio (Frédéric Dard).

Jeanne Moreau won the 1992 César Award for Best Actress for her performance.

== Cast ==
- Jeanne Moreau as Lady M
- Michel Serrault as Pompilius
- Luc Thuillier as Lambert
- Géraldine Danon as Noemie
- Jean Bouchaud as Mazurier
- Marie-Dominique Aumont as Muriel
- Hester Wilcox as Director's daughter
- Léa Gabriele as Girl in Blue
- Lara Guirao as Librarian
- Mattia Sbragia as Stern

== Reception ==
The film was not commercially successful in France, selling only 526,018 tickets.

It received mixed reviews from critics. The New York Times called the film "cheerfully depraved", and said Moreau's performance "is a classic star turn that lends an essentially frivolous movie a surprising soulfulness." Empire said "Moreau sparkles as the domineering, violent but ironically godly Lady M: by turns becoming beautiful, tragically little-girl-lost, and almost frightening. Serrault is in equally fine fettle, as a kind of devious old innocent" but their verbal sparring "soon becomes really a tad tiresome." TV Guide called it "an entertaining character study that leans too heavily on Moreau's physical ruin but compensates with the sharp -- but seldom bitter -- dialogue." Time Out remarked that "Heynemann's mainstream comedy has surprisingly dark undercurrents - it's a caper movie which dares to ebb from time to time."

== Awards and nominations ==
- César Awards
  - Won: Best Actress – Leading Role (Jeanne Moreau)
