= Grande Loge de France =

Masonic organization in France

- Formation: 1728
- Type: Freemasonic Grand Lodge
- Headquarters: 8, rue Puteaux, 17th arrondissement of Paris
- Location: France
- Main organ: PVI - Points de Vue Initiatiques
- Parent organization: Ancient and Accepted Scottish Rite – Suprême Conseil de France
- Affiliations: Confédération Internationale des Grandes Loges Unies
- Website: www.gldf.org

Grande Loge de France (French pronunciation: [ɡʁɑ̃d lɔʒ də fʁɑ̃s], abbr. GLDF) is an independent Masonic obedience based in France. Its conception of Freemasonry is spiritual, traditional, and initiatory. Its ritual is centred on the Ancient and Accepted Scottish Rite. It occupies a unique position in the landscape of French Freemasonry but maintains its closest relationships with obediences belonging to Continental Freemasonry, and shares its motto Liberté, Egalité, Fraternité with the French Republic.

== History ==
=== Origins of the name and foundation ===
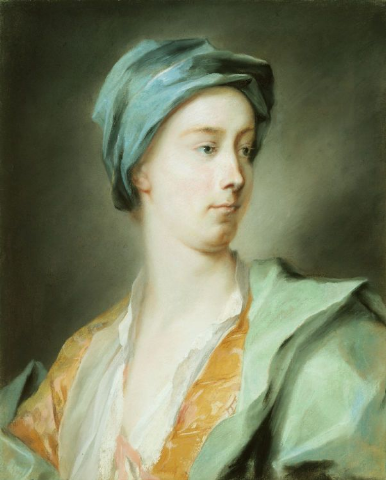
The Duke of Wharton (1698–1731), Grand Master of all Freemasons in France in 1728

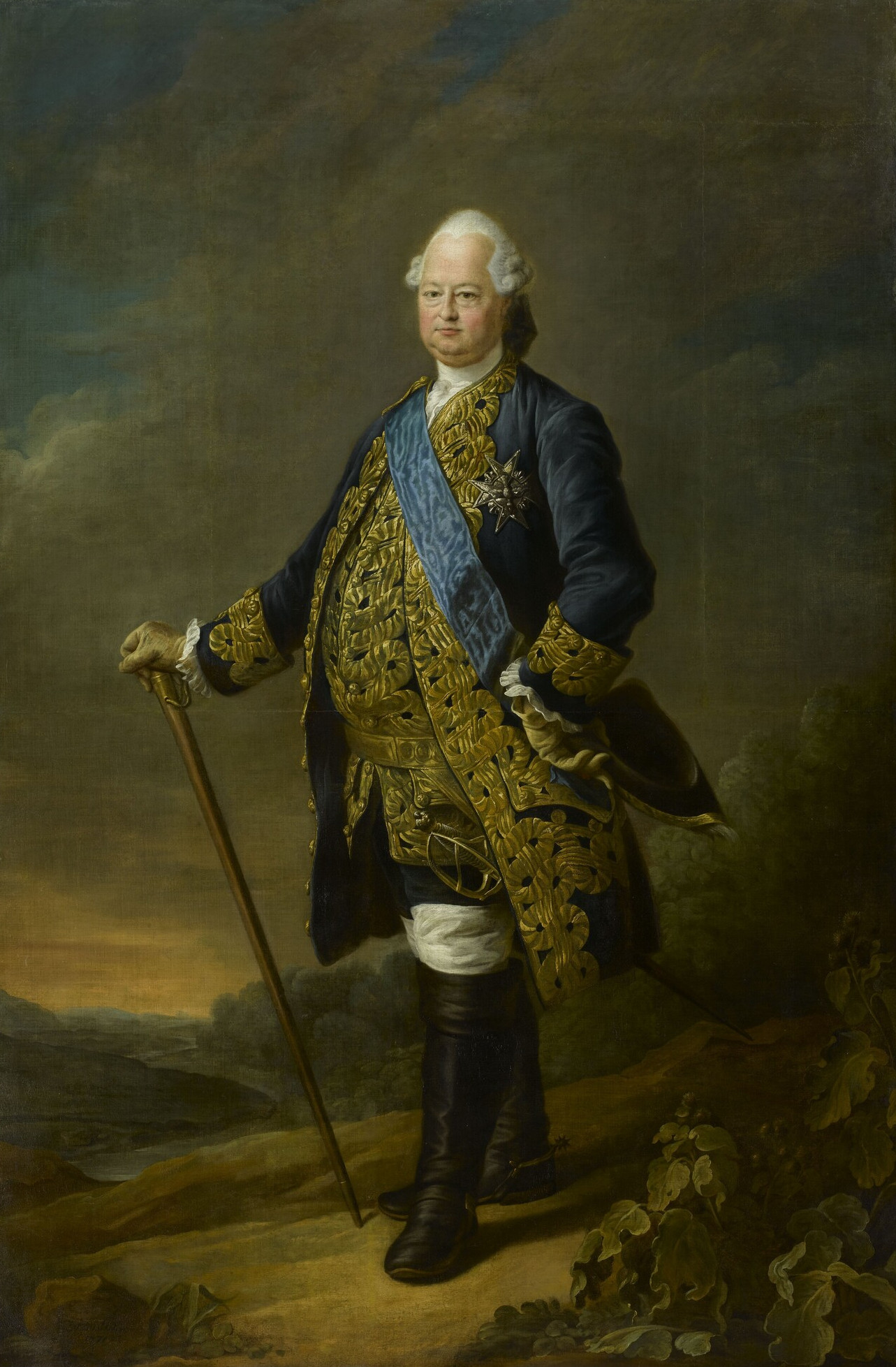
Louis, Count of Clermont, Grand Master of the Grande Loge de France from 1743 to 1771, portrayed by François-Hubert Drouais.

The name Grande Loge de France was used by the first French Masonic grand body of which the oldest records are dated 14 May 1737. However, it dates back to 1728 when French Masons had decided to recognize Philip Wharton, 1st Duke of Wharton—who lived in Paris and Lyon in 1728 and 1729 and who had been Grand Master of the Grand Lodge of London and Westminster in 1723—as Grand Master of all Freemasons in France. Two other jacobite Grand Masters succeeded him: James Hector MacLean (1703–1750) and Charles Radclyffe, Count of Derwentwater (1693–1746), elected Grand Master of the Order of Free Masons in the Kingdom of France on 27 December 1746.

In December 1736, Chevalier Andrew Michael Ramsay (1686–1743) delivered a reception discourse elaborating on what could be a connection between Freemasonry and the Crusader knights. This discourse had a great influence on the development of several side Degrees over the period 1740–1770 in France. In the 1738 version, Anderson's Constitutions mention the existence of a Grand Master and Lodges in France and defined them to be equal to the Lodges of York, Ireland, Scotland, and Italy.

Following the death of the Grand Master of all Regular Lodges in France Louis de Pardaillan de Gondrin, Duke of Antin, his successor Louis, Count of Clermont (1709–1771), blood Prince Bourbon-Condé and future member of the Académie Française was elected on 11 December 1743.

In the following years, many additional "Scottish" High Degrees are redacted in France. They were put in practise in Bordeaux, Lyon and Marseille. The Grande Loge de France did not take part in their development but recognized them as of 4 July 1755 in its General Bylaws, thus acknowledging different privileges to Scottish Masters.

In 1773, a large number of Grande Loge de France Lodges gave themselves a new set of Statutes which lead to the creation the Grand Orient de France. Nevertheless, several Parisian Masters and several provincial Lodges objected to these new Statutes, and more particularly to the article which stipulated that Masters must be elected by the free-choice of their Lodge. As a result, they decided to pursue working under the name Grande Loge de Clermont, named after the Grand Master who had died in 1771.

The French Revolution forced the Grande Loge de Clermont to suspend its activities in November 1792. After the Terror, they will resume on 17 October 1796, with only 10 Lodges in Paris and 8 in the provinces. The Grand Orient de France had its number of Lodges also drastically reduced over that period. It was able to resume its activities a bit later, on 24 February 1797.

Alexandre Roëttiers de Montaleau was appointed Great Worshipful Master to operate the merger between the Grande Loge de Clermont and the Grand Orient de France on 10 June 1799. Pursuing its path for reformation, the Grand Orient de France then reorganized its system of High Degrees of the French Rite, defined in seven degrees. In its general circular dated 12 November 1802, the Grand Orient de France prohibited the practice of any other system of High Degrees to all its member Lodges.

Jean-Jacques Régis de Cambacérès, Sovereign Grand Commander of the Ancient and Accepted Scottish Rite in France from 1806 to 1821

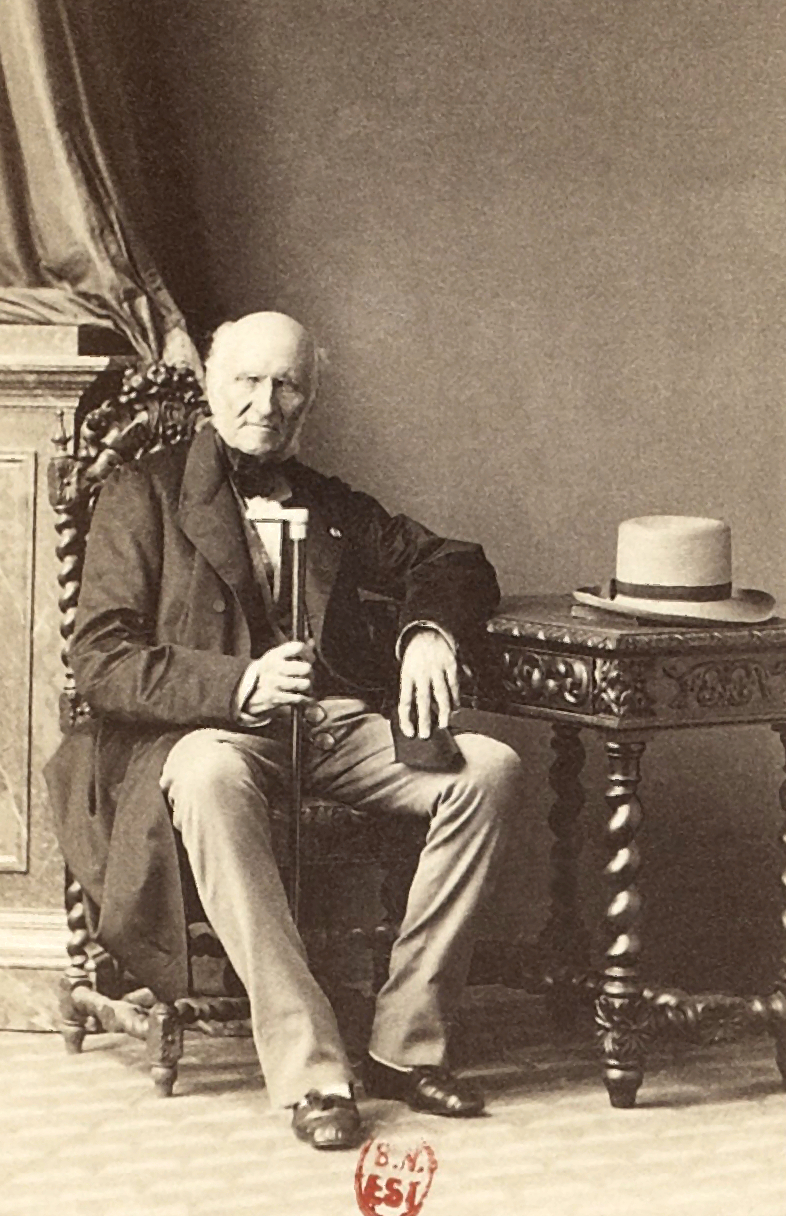
The Sovereign Grand Commander of the Supreme Conseil de France from 1838 to 1860: Élie, Duc Decazes, here in 1859

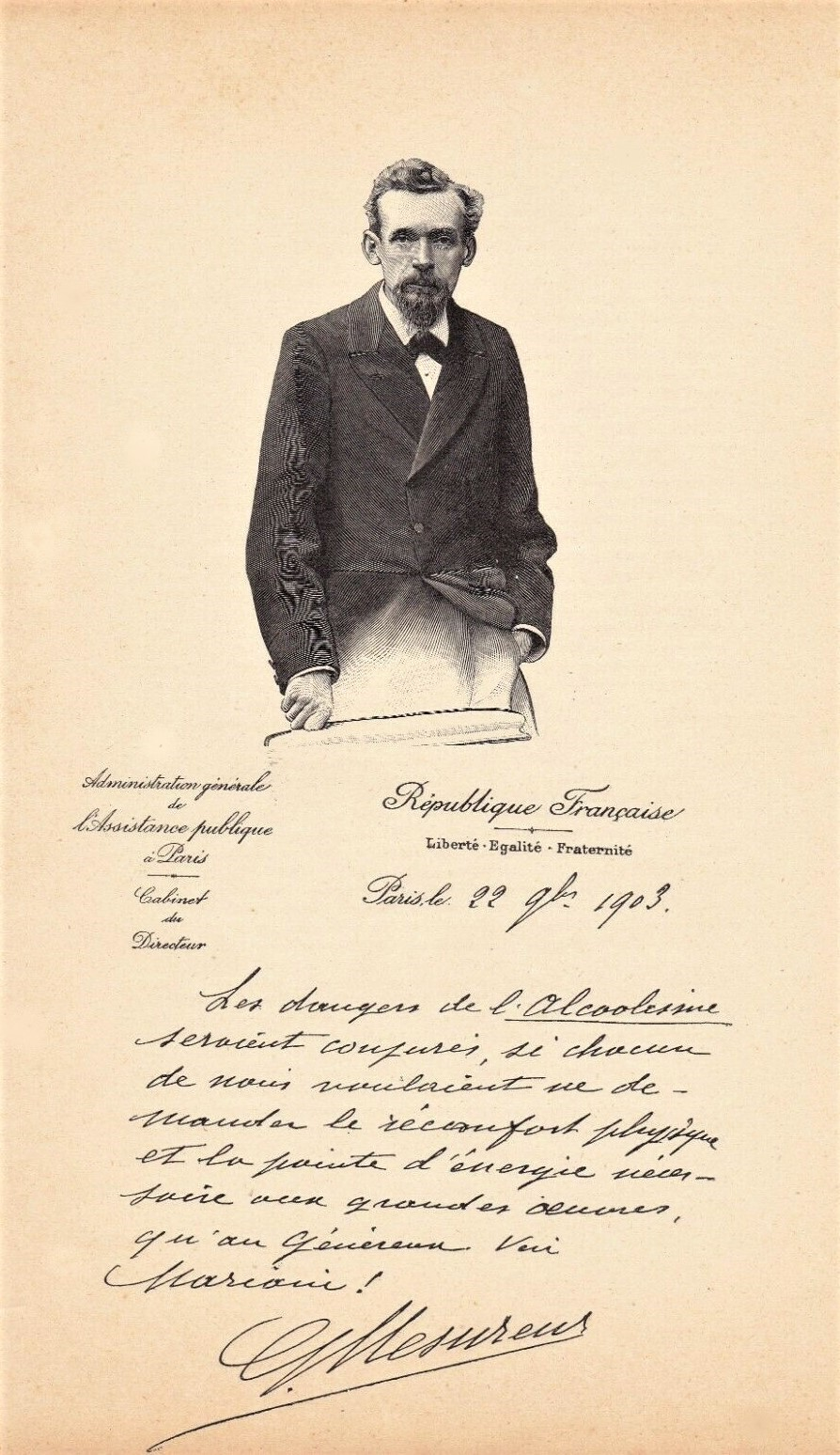
Gustave Mesureur, thrice Grand Master of the Grande Loge de France

=== The Scottish Rite in France between 1804 and 1894 ===
In 1804, Alexandre Francois Auguste de Grasse, Count de Grasse-Tilly recently arrived in Paris brought news of the birth of the Ancient and Accepted Scottish Rite in the United States in 1801, the Rite being based on the Scottish Degrees originating from French Antilles.

He received a warm welcome from brethren and founded on 22 September 1804 the first continental Supreme Council of the Ancient and Accepted Scottish Rite. The same enhanced the transformation of Lodges recently aggregated around « Saint-Alexandre d’Écosse » into a new symbolic Obedience in charge of the first three symbolic Degrees: the Grande Loge Générale Ecossaise. The « Grande Loge Générale Ecossaise » elected Prince Louis Bonaparte as its first Grand Master. However, Napoleon I, Emperor of the French imposed its merger with the Grand Orient de France on 5 December 1804 under the authority of Jean-Jacques-Régis de Cambacérès.

The vocabulary applicable to Freemasonry in France evolved at that time: Scottish Lodge which characterised High Degrees became of use to define all Lodges not pertaining to the French Rite. Elements from the Grande Loge des Anciens founded in England in 1751 rooted the first Three Degrees of the Rite in 1804. Its completion was reached in 1821 with the publishing of the Guide des Macons Ecossais. It was enacted by the Suprême Conseil de France who then administered the 33 Degrees of the Ancient and Accepted Scottish Rite.

In 1838, the Élie, duc Decazes is appointed Sovereign Grand Commander of the Supreme Conseil de France: he will occupy the charge until 1860.

In 1862, Napoléon III personally appointed Bernard Pierre Magnan Marshall of France to be the successor of Prince Lucien Murat as Grand Master of the Grand Orient de France. Bernard Pierre Magnan intended to impose the reunification of all Rites then practised in France within the Grand Orient de France. He failed to do so due to the valiant opposition of Jean-Pons-Guillaume Viennet, Sovereign Grand Commander of the Suprême Conseil de France from 1860 to 1868.

=== Recent history ===
The current Grande Loge de France (G∴L∴D∴F∴) was revived in 1894 when the Scottish Rite masonic streams were unified. In 1904, privileges to fully administrate the first Three Degrees of Ancient and Accepted Scottish Rite were delegated by the Suprême Conseil de France.

The first Constitution of the revived Grande Loge de France - based on the Declaration of Principles from the Convent of Lausanne of 1875 - defined Freemasonry as a "universal alliance based on solidarity" aiming at the promotion of emancipatory evolution of Humanity.

In the early 20th century, the Grande Loge de France grew from 3,000 members in 1894 to 8,400 in 1912. In 1914, it accounted with 149 Lodges. Some of these Lodges were specifically centered on the study of symbolism: the Anglo-Saxon Lodge as well Thebah, Lodge of which René Guénon was a member.

In 1911, Grande Loge de France purchased a former Franciscan monastery at 8 rue Puteaux in Paris 17th district to establish its current Headquarters. During the First World War and even though activity was reduced, an International Conference was held in January 1917 between Obediences from France, Belgium, Italy and Serbia. The creation of the League of Nations was favourably voted on that occasion. An exceptional Convent was held on 30 and 31 January 1926 with the purpose of fighting fascism.

In June 1940, the archives of Grande Loge de France were seized by the Gestapo and the German authorities occupied the building of 8 rue Puteaux. However, the Scottish Freemasonry tried to survive in the clandestinity imposed by wartimes, but and following the Principles that had been edicted by the Grand Master Dumesnil de Gramont at the end of 1940.

At the time of the Libération and due to the deaths of many members in Deportation, the Grande Loge de France resumed its works with only 3,600 brethren. It focused on its works and the initiatory and symbolic dimensions of traditional Freemasonry.

In December 1948, a major Temple of the Grande Loge de France Headquarters was named in honor of Brother Franklin D. Roosevelt. It was inaugurated by Eleanor Roosevelt in person.

In the 1960s and 1970s its Grand Master, Doctor Pierre Simon (physician) played a key role in the elaboration of the law on contraception presented to Parliament by Simone Veil in 1975.

During the second half of the 20th century, Grande Loge de France has steadily grown from 438 Lodges and 17,500 members in 1989 to 640 Lodges and 25,000 members in 1998. As of 2020 it accounts with 930 Lodges and over 33,000 members.

The Grande Loge de France works the first three Degrees of the Ancient and Accepted Scottish Rite (A&ASR).

== Principles and governance ==
=== Principles of Freemasonry ===
The Grande Loge de France imposes the strict observance of the fundamental following principles:

- Invocation to the Great Architect of the Universe,
- Presence in Lodge of the Three Great Lights: the Volume of the Sacred Law (Bible) opened and exposed with the Square and the Compass,
- Exclusive sovereignty over the Symbolic Degrees
- Total independence of any other structure including of High Degrees
- Male-only attendance in all Ritual works
- Exemption of any political or religious discussion in the Lodge
- Progressive and Spiritual approach to the initiatory process

As such, the Grande Loge de France operates in the respect of fundamental Principles of traditional Freemasonry and refers constantly to the motto Ordo Ab Chao of the Ancient and Accepted Scottish Rite.

=== Governance ===
The Grande Loge de France is governed by a Federal Counsel of 33 members elected by the Representative of each of the 930 Lodges during the annual Convent (General Assembly). The duration of the charge is 3 years. The Federal Counsel is presided by the Grand Master also elected by the Convent for the same duration of mandate. The Grande Loge de France is defined by its Constitution and General Bylaws which apply to all members of the Grand Lodge (Obédience maçonnique).

== Grande Loge de France outside France ==
The Grande Loge de France has 36 lodges in 17 countries outside France as a result of history (Lodges in former French colonies) or when no Amity between a foreign Grand Lodge and the Grande Loge de France yet existed in the country at the time of the foundation.

- Belgium: Two lodges in Tournai and Baisieux
- Canada: One lodge in Montreal
- Cambodia: One lodge in Phnom Penh
- Congo: Ten lodges in Brazzaville, Dolisie, Goma, Kimshasa and Pointe Noire
- Costa Rica: One lodge in San Jose
- Dominican Republic: One lodge in Saint Domingue
- England: One lodge in London
- Israel: One lodge in Jerusalem, one lodge in Tel Aviv
- Lithuania: One lodge in Vilnius
- Madagascar: One lodge in Antananarivo
- Mauritius: Six lodges in Grand Baie, Pamplemousses, Port-Louis, Saint-Pierre and Vacoas.
- Poland: One lodge in Warsaw
- Russia: One lodge in Moscow
- Senegal: Three lodges in Dakar and Saly Portudal
- Spain: One lodge in Barcelona
- Thailand: One lodge in Bangkok, one lodge in Phuket
- Vietnam: One lodge in Ho-Chi Minh

== International Confederation of United Grand Lodges of Ancient and Accepted Scottish Rite ==
In 2000, together with other Grand National Lodge of Yugoslavia (now Grand National Lodge of Serbia) and the Traditional and Symbolic "Opera" Grand Lodge (G∴L∴T∴S∴O∴) and the G∴L∴D∴F∴ formed the Confederation of the United Grand Lodges of Europe.

As of 2020, the structure evolved and became the International Confederation of United Grand Lodges of Ancient and Accepted Scottish Rite with 30 constituent members:

- Grand Lodge of the AASR of Austria
- Grand Lodge of Bulgaria
- Grande Loge Unie du Cameroun
- Gran Logia de Canarias
- Grand Lodge of Czech Lands
- Gran Logia Escosesa de Colombia
- Grande Loge Unie de Côte d'Ivoire
- Gran Logia de Ecuador A&ASR
- Gran Logia General de Espana
- Grande Loge de France
- Grande Loge Symbolique du Gabon
- Grand Lodge of Greece A&ASR
- United Grand Lodge of Greece A&ASR
- Grand Lodge of Hungary A&ASR
- Grand Lodge of South India
- Serenissima Gran Loggia d'Italia
- United Grand Lodge of Latvia
- Grande Loge Unie du Liban
- Grande Loge Unie du Maroc
- National Grand Lodge of Moldova
- Gran Logia de Mexico A&ASR
- Gran Logia de Libres y Acceptados Masones de Paraguay
- Gran Logia Nacional de Filipinas
- National Grand Lodge of Romania
- United Grand Lodge of Russia
- Gran Logia Simbólica de El Salvador
- Grand National Lodge of Serbia
- Regular Grand Lodge of Slovenia
- Mexican Grand Lodge of Texas A&ASR
- Grande Loge du Togo
- Gran Oriente de Uruguay
- National Grand Lodge of Portugal

== Bibliography ==
- Connaître la Grande Loge de France, édit. Ivoire Clair, collection Les Architectes de la Connaissance dirigée par Philippe Morbach, Paris, 2000 ISBN 2-913882-06-4
- Daniel Ligou (dir.), Histoire des Francs-Maçons en France, tome 2, 1815-2000, Privat, Toulouse, 2000 ISBN 2-7089-6839-4
