= Jean Verdun =

French writer (1931–2021)

- Born: 21 March 1931; Marcq-en-Barœul, France
- Died: 21 October 2021 (aged 90)
- Occupation: Writer

Jean Verdun (21 March 1931 – 21 October 2021) was a French writer.

== Biography ==
Jean's father, Henri Verdun, was a judge who was killed in 1944. He was the nephew of politician André Diethelm. Verdun wrote numerous novels and plays on Freemasonry in France. From 1985 to 1988, he was Grand Master of the Grande Loge de France. In 1997, he left the Grand Orient de France, but returned in 2019.

Verdun died on 21 October 2021 at the age of 90.

== Works ==
- Les Jeunes loups (1956)
- L’École de Paris (1959)
- Retournons rue Montorgueil (1960)
- Brumaire (1961)
- La Soirée chez Ramon (1963)
- L’Enfant nu (1966)
- Les Chroniques de l’abbaye (1973)
- Mille Matins d’été (1973)
- L’Amour de loin (1974)
- Le Carnaval du Père-Lachaise (1980)
- La Réalité maçonnique (1982)
- Carnets d’un Grand Maître (1991)
- Le Franc-Maçon récalcitrant (1996)
- L’Alibi d’amour (1999)
- Retour au bercail (2000)
- La Nouvelle Réalité maçonnique (2001)
- L’Empereur de rien (2001)
- Mieux que nos pères (2001)
- L’Architecte (2002)
- Royal Au-delà (2002)
- Lumière sur la franc-maçonnerie universelle (2002)
- À l’abbaye (2003)
- Bébé-Fleur (2003)
- La Jeune Fille honteuse (2004)
- Grand Jour d’espoir au cap Misène (2005)
- Sainte-Victoire, magique montagne (2009)
- Rhapsodie en bleu, Voyage initiatique autour des loges bleues (2013)
- La franc-maçonne du Luberon (2015)
- Carrefours initiatiques (2017)
- Le Cercle des Subtils (2018)
- Dernières Nouvelles d'Elles (2020)

Masonic offices
Preceded by Henri Tort-Nouguès	Grand Master of the Grande Loge de France; 1985—1988	Succeeded by Guy Piau
