= Love at Sea (1965 film) =

Film by Guy Gilles

- 2004 French re-release poster
- French: L'Amour à la mer
- Directed by: Guy Gilles
- Written by: Guy Gilles
- Produced by: Guy Gilles
- Starring: Daniel Moosmann; Geneviève Thénier; Guy Gilles; Josette Krief
- Cinematography: Jean-Marc Ripert
- Edited by: Noun Serra
- Music by: Jean-Pierre Stora
- Production company: Filmax
- Release dates: 5 June 1965 (Pesaro); May 1966 (France)
- Running time: 73 minutes
- Country: France
- Language: French

Love at Sea (French: L'Amour à la mer) is a 1965 French drama film written and directed by Guy Gilles.

== Synopsis ==
Unsure of his future, Daniel signed up for five years in the Navy. Stationed in Algeria, he saw little fighting but experienced the tension and the tragedies. His girl friend Geneviève, working as a secretary in Paris, is faithful to him and lives for the day they can be together. As his release approaches, he is less and less sure about his future. Once free, he goes to Paris but it is two days before he can face Geneviève. Telling her that he cannot love her or live with her, he departs for the south coast with a suitcase, moving aimlessly from place to place.

== Cast ==
- Daniel Moosmann as Daniel
- Guy Gilles as Guy
- Geneviève Thénier as Geneviève
- Simone Paris as the landlady
- Josette Krief as Josette
- Lili Bontemps as the singer
- Juliette Gréco as the film actress
- Alain Delon as film actor
- Romy Schneider as the star (scene cut)
- Jean-Claude Brialy as man
- Sophie Daumier as the girl at the bar
- Jean-Pierre Léaud as the boy leaving the cinema
- Bernard Verley as a friend of Geneviève
- Jean-Daniel Simon
