= Guy Gilles =

French film director (1938–1996)

- Born: Guy Chiche; 25 August 1938; Algiers, Algeria
- Died: 3 February 1996 (aged 57); Paris, France
- Occupation: Film director

Guy Gilles (born Guy Chiche; 25 August 1938 – 3 February 1996) was a French film director.

== Biography ==
He directed his first short film, Soleil éteint, in 1958. He changed his surname to Gilles based on the name of his mother (Gilette) to create a pseudonym. After studying at the Beaux-Arts, he moved to Paris, where he worked as an assistant to François Reichenbach in 1964.

His first feature film, L'Amour à la mer (1962), starred Daniel Moosmann and Geneviève Thénier, with guest appearances by Juliette Gréco, Alain Delon and Jean-Pierre Léaud. Patrick Jouan featured in many of his films. He also worked for television with productions such as Dim Dam Dom and Pour le plaisir.

His romantic relationship with Jeanne Moreau seemed to inspire the movie Absences répétées which received the Prix Jean-Vigo in 1973.

Hélène Martin requested him to make a documentary about Jean Genet Saint, poète et martyr. It was released at a gay film festival organized by Lionel Soukaz in 1978, and the film was troubled by a fascist group that injured the director.

His latest films include Le Crime d'amour (1982), with Richard Berry and Jacques Penot, and Nuit docile (1987). He contracted AIDS in the late 1980s, and in experiencing difficulties with production, he struggled to complete Néfertiti, la fille du soleil in 1994 which was released in 1996 on the year of death.

A retrospective was presented at the 31st International Film Festival of La Rochelle in July 2003.

== Filmography ==
=== Film ===
- 1956 : Les chasseurs d'autographes
- 1958 : Soleil éteint
- 1959 : Au biseau des baisers
- 1961 : Mélancholia
- 1964 : Journal d'un combat
- 1964 : L'Amour à la mer
- 1965 : Paris un jour d'hiver
- 1966 : Les cafés de Paris
- 1966 : Chanson de geste
- 1966 : Le jardin des Tuileries
- 1966 : Les cafés de Paris
- 1967 : Un dimanche à Aurillac
- 1968 : Au pan coupé
- 1970 : Le clair de terre
- 1971 : Côté cour, côté champs
- 1972 : Absences répétées
- 1974 : Le Jardin qui bascule
- 1976 : Montreur d'images
- 1982 : Le Crime d'amour
- 1987 : La Nuit docile
- 1994 : Néfertiti, la fille du soleil

=== Television ===
- 1965 : Ciné Bijou
- 1966 : Pop'âge
- 1967 : Festivals 1966 Cinémas 1967
- 1969 : Vie retrouvée
- 1969 : Le Partant
- 1971 : Proust, l'art et la douleur
- 1974 : Saint, poète et martyr (about Jean Genet)
- 1975 : La Loterie de la vie
- 1975 : La Vie filmée : 1946-54
- 1983 : Où sont-elle donc ?
- 1984 : Un garçon de France, based on Pascal Sevran's novel
- 1992 : Dis papa, raconte-moi là-bas about Algeria
- 1994 : La Lettre de Jean about toxicomania
