= André Charpak =

Polish-born French actor, dialoguist, film director and screenwriter

- Born: 4 September 1928; Sarny, Poland
- Died: 23 June 2006 (aged 77); Créteil, France
- Education: Lycée Henri-IV
- Occupation(s): Actor, Film director, screenwriter
- Family: Georges Charpak (brother)

André Charpak (4 September 1928 – 23 June 2006) was a Polish-born French actor, dialoguist, film director and screenwriter. A brother of the physicist Georges Charpak he was an alumnus of the prestigious Lycée Henri-IV where he earned his Baccalauréat.

== Filmography ==
Director and screenwriter

- 1964: Mayeux le bossu (short film) with Jacques Dufilho
- 1964 : La Vie normale
- 1967: Le Crime de David Levinstein
- 1970: La Provocation
- 1973: William Conrad (téléfilm) with Pierre Boulle

Actor

- 1958 : En bordée by Pierre Chevalier
- 1961: Sur la Piste... (Les Cinq Dernières Minutes, n°19), by Claude Loursais
- 1962: Paludi (telefilm)
- 1965: La Dame de pique by Léonard Keigel
- 1967 : Le Crime de David Levinstein
- 1970 : La Provocation with Jean Marais
- 1973 : William Conrad (telefilm)
- 1973 : Le Feu sous la neige (telefilm)
- 1973: Le Drakkar by Jacques Pierre (telefilm)
- 1978: Meurtre sur la personne de la mer (telefilm)
- La Première Légion (telefilm)

== Theatre ==
- 1959 : The Gambler after Fyodor Dostoyevsky, mise en scène
- 1961 : Life Is a Dream by Pedro Calderón de la Barca, directed by André Charpak
- 1963 : Monsieur Vautrin (adaptation of the play by Balzac)
- 1963 : Another Man's Wife (by Fyodor Dostoyevsky)
