= Alexandre Francois Auguste de Grasse =

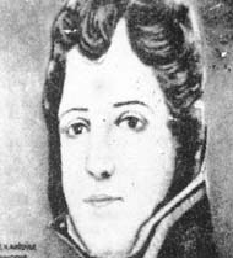
Alexandre Francois Auguste de Grasse

Alexandre Francois Auguste de Grasse, known as Auguste de Grasse and Comte de Grasse-Tilly (February 14, 1765 – June 10, 1845), was a French career army officer. He was assigned to the French colony of Saint-Domingue in 1789, where he married in Cap Français, and acquired a plantation and 200 slaves before the Haitian Revolution. Following the Royal Navy's defeat of the French fleet in Saint-Domingue in 1793, de Grasse was allowed to resign his commission and leave with his family and in-laws for Charleston, South Carolina.

There he and several fellow French colonial refugees joined the Freemasons in Charleston, forming a French chapter. In 1796 de Grasse was made a Director Inspector General of Freemasonry in Charleston; in 1801 he was among the eleven founders there of the Supreme Council of the Scottish Rite. He was later chosen as Grand Marshal of the South Carolina Ancient Grand Lodge.

De Grasse later returned to France after Napoleon came to power, and was able to resume his military career. He was also instrumental in founding new Scottish Rite councils in Paris and major European cities. In 1840 he published a biography of his father, Notice biographique sur l'amiral comte de Grasse d'après les documents inédits. It included reflections on his own life and experiences in Saint-Domingue and the United States.

== Life ==
Alexandre Francois Auguste de Grasse, known as Auguste de Grasse, was baptized in St. Louis Parish, Versailles, France. He had a younger brother Maxime, who became a knight of Malta and died in 1773. He had four younger sisters: Amélie Rosalie Maxime, Adélaide, Mélanie Veronique Maxime, and Silvie de Grasse. His father, François Joseph Paul de Grasse, also known as Comte de Grasse, was a career naval officer who helped rebuild the navy after France's defeat in the Seven Years' War. Their mother Antoinette Rosalie Accaron died young, after the birth of her last child.

Their father married again, to Catherine Pien, widow of M. de Villeneuve. After Catherine's death, their father married for a third time, to Marie Delphine Lazare de Cibon, who survived him.

France committed naval forces and other resources to support the rebels in the American Revolutionary War. Commanding the French fleet in the Battle of the Chesapeake, Admiral de Grasse became a hero of the war. His forces surprised the English fleet and defeated it, leading to the surrender by Cornwallis at Yorktown in 1781. But the next year, Admiral de Grasse suffered a defeat and was captured by the British in the Caribbean at the Battle of the Saintes. He was cleared of fault by a court martial in France.

=== Military career ===
The younger Auguste de Grasse had a career in the French army. After his father's death in 1788, he was assigned to the French colony of Saint-Domingue in 1789. His stepmother, Marie Delphine Lazare de Cibon (his father's third wife), and four sisters joined him in Saint-Domingue. They were fleeing the violence and disruption of the French Revolution. While stationed there, de Grasse married the daughter of Jean-Baptiste de La Hogue (also recorded as Delahogue). The young couple had a daughter who was born at Cap Français. De Grasse acquired a large plantation and 200 slaves.

In 1793 the Haitian Revolution was underway, and Great Britain attempted to intervene, hoping to get a toehold in the rich French colony. The Royal Navy defeated the French fleet at Saint-Domingue, and its commanders allowed French military officers to leave the island after they resigned their commissions. French forces and thousands of colonists left Saint-Domingue because of the violence of the Haitian Revolution. De Grasse lost all his property there, including the slaves.

He and his family, including his father-in-law and mother-in-law de La Hogue, went to Charleston, South Carolina, along with numerous other French colonial refugees. They arrived on August 14, 1793, aboard the ship Thomas. The refugees were received by John B. Holmes and lived with him for some time at his residence, now 15 Meeting Street.

In July 1794, de Grasse's four sisters traveled to Washington, D.C., via the ship Thorn to Boston. They solicited the American government in a claim for the war pension due their father and his estate, as they had become impoverished due to their father's death, followed by the French Revolution and its overturning of aristocratic families. Later the next year, Congress awarded the daughters annual pensions of one thousand dollars each in gratitude for their father's "extraordinary services" to the American cause.

Also in 1794, de Grasse wrote to President George Washington pleading for assistance to survive since he and his family had been forced to leave Saint-Domingue. He noted that he and other officers had to resign their commissions in the French army in order to be permitted to leave. No response is documented. After stopping at Washington, D.C., the sisters rejoined de Grasse and his family in Charleston. While living there, de Grasse had two of his daughters baptized, probably at St. Mary's Church.

His youngest sister Silvie married M. Francis de Pau, also a French refugee from Saint-Domingue, and they settled in New York City. (She lived to January 5, 1855, age 83, and had two sons and five daughters.) In the summer of 1799, Adélaide died on August 23 and Mélanie died September 19, both of yellow fever in the epidemic of that year. Both sisters were buried at St. Mary's Church in Charleston. Their sister Amélie never married and died years later.

In 1798 de Grasse traveled to Saint-Domingue to offer his services to General Théodore-Joseph d'Hédouville, who had been sent to Saint-Domingue by the French Directory to try to divide the two leaders, Toussaint Louverture and André Rigaud, who controlled the island. De Grasse was captured, imprisoned, and put in irons. The American Consul intervened, showing proof that de Grasse had become a naturalized American citizen. He was freed and put on the next ship to Charleston.

By 1800 his father-in-law de La Hogue (who also became known as Delahogue) had established a school in Charleston, and added military classes. His ad in the City Gazette and the Advertiser (Charleston) on October 16 announced the following:

"Those persons who may desire their children to learn the principles of Fortifications and Artillery will pay an additional price per month. He [Delahogue] has made arrangements for this purpose with Mr. Auguste de Grasse, his son-in-law."

De Grasse was also teaching in order to make a living. On January 10, 1801, he advertised in the Times paper in Charleston, announcing he had opened a new "Fencing Room" for classes, located at his house on Federal Street. Also listed were its hours of operation.

== Scottish Rite ==
De Grasse's father-in-law Jean-Baptiste de La Hogue became a founder of a Masonic lodge named La Candeur at Charleston. The founding members were primarily French Roman Catholics, most of them refugees from Saint-Domingue or from the Revolution in France.

On December 12, 1796, in Charleston, the Comte de Grasse-Tilly, along with his father-in-law de La Hogue and six other French refugees from Saint-Domingue, was issued a patent by Hyman Long making each man a Deputy Grand Inspector General (DGIG). This appointment was a title recognizing that the bearer was in possession of the secrets of the "Rite of the Royal Secret". After a fire destroyed the building at Church and Broad streets along with all the Masonic records, the lodge was temporarily inactive for some time.

Long, born in the British colony of Jamaica, had gained qualification as a medical doctor and emigrated to New York City. He had received the appointment and right to appoint new DGIGs by Moses Cohen. Cohen in turn had received his appointment the year before from the American Barend M. Spitzer of Georgia.

The eight French emigres organized a Consistory of the 25th Degree, or "Princes of the Royal Secret." By 1798 de Grasse was recorded as the Master of La Candeur Masonic Lodge in Charleston. On August 4, 1799, de Grasse demitted from Loge La Candeur. On August 10, he became a founder of Loge La Réunion Française at Charleston.

A few years later in 1801, de Grasse and de La Hogue were among the eleven founders of the first Supreme Council of the Scottish Rite. It was the Mother Council of the Ancient and Accepted Scottish Rite. All other Supreme Councils of the world derive their authority from it. De Grasse was appointed by the Council as Grand Marshal of the South Carolina Ancient Grand Lodge.

1802

- February 21 – Brother de Grasse, Deputy Inspector General was appointed by the Supreme Council as the new Grand Inspector General, and Grand Commander of the French West Indies. Establishes a Supreme Council for the West Indies.
- Also appointed at this time was Illustrious Brother Jean-Baptiste Marie de La Hogue, Deputy Inspector Grand Commander of the West Indies.

== Later years ==
De Grasse returned to France with his family after Napoleon came to power. He was allowed to re-enter the military. In 1816 he was asked to resign, at the age of 51.

He continued his development work with Masons in France and across Europe. In March 1805 he established a Supreme Council of the Scottish Rite for Italy, based in Milan. In October 1809 he established a Supreme Council for Spain, based in Madrid. He was elected as the Grand Commander of the Supreme Council of France, a position he held until 1821, when he resigned. Disagreements had arisen starting in 1818, especially in relation to the Supreme Council of the Grand Orient. France eventually developed three Supreme Councils.

De Grasse published a biography of his father in 1840, as Notice biographique sur l'amiral comte de Grasse d'après les documents inédits. In the book he also described his own journey to the New World, and his time in Cap Francais, Saint-Domingue; and Charleston, South Carolina, in the United States. He describes himself as being "76 years old, a worthy father, and after a life so full, he has reached old age without his rights to the gratitude of his country having ever been recognized." He wrote that as military men, he and his father were both victims of political upheavals in France.

On June 10, 1845, Count de Grasse, Alexandre Francois Auguste, Major, age 80, was registered at the Infirmary de l’Hotel des Invalides (Military Hospital) in Paris. He died around 12:30 AM of chronic bronchial pneumonia.
