= Repeated Absences =

Absences répétées
- Directed by: Guy Gilles
- Written by: Guy Gilles
- Produced by: François Reichenbach; Jacques Portet; Alain Poiré
- Starring: Patrick Penn; Danièle Delorme; Yves Robert; Nathalie Delon
- Cinematography: Philippe Rousselot
- Edited by: Hélène Viard
- Music by: Jean-Pierre Stora
- Distributed by: Gaumont Distribution
- Release date: 1972
- Running time: 85 minutes
- Country: France
- Language: French

Repeated Absences (French: Absences répétées) is a 1972 French drama film directed by Guy Gilles.

== Cast ==
- Patrick Penn ... François Naulet
- Danièle Delorme ... François's mother
- Nathalie Delon ... Sophie
- Yves Robert ... François's father
- Patrick Jouané ... Guy (as Patrick Jouanné)
- Thomas Andhersen ... Pierrot
- Pierre Bertin ... The man at the party
- Gabriel Cattand ... The cop
- Jacques Castelot ... The bank director
- Claude Génia ... Jeanne Larivière
- Corinne Le Poulain ... Guy's wife
- Jean-François Balmer ... The waiter
